= John Snowdon Henry =

British politician (1824–1896)

- Born: 30 September 1824; Manchester, United Kingdom
- Died: 30 October 1896 (aged 72); Bonchurch, Isle of Wight
- Known for: Businessman, Parliamentarian and Volunteer officer
- Spouse: Annie Wood

John Snowdon Henry (30 September 1824 – 30 October 1896) was a British businessman and Conservative Party politician.

== Family life ==
He was the eldest son of Alexander Henry, founder of A & S Henry & Co, a Manchester-based firm of cotton merchants, who was a Conservative Member of Parliament (MP) for South Lancashire from 1847 to 1852. His younger brother was Mitchell Henry who later became a Liberal Party parliamentarian. He married Annie Wood of County Durham, and they had two daughters.

A resident of Crumpsall, near Manchester, in 1865 Henry purchased East Dene, Bonchurch, Isle of Wight, the childhood home of the poet Algernon Charles Swinburne.

== Volunteering ==
During the invasion scare of 1859, he recruited a company of Rifle Volunteers from employees of the family firm, which was soon joined by other companies to form the 3rd Manchester Rifles. Henry served as Major and first commanding officer of the unit before handing over to the Hon Algernon Egerton, MP for South Lancashire and younger son of the Earl of Ellesmere.

== Political career ==
At the 1868 general election, Henry was selected by the Conservatives to contest the newly created South-Eastern Division of Lancashire, which would return two Members of Parliament (MPs) to the House of Commons. He was elected along with his party colleague, Algernon Egerton. He held the seat until the 1874 general election, when he did not seek re-election.

Henry died at East Dene in October 1896, aged 72.

Parliament of the United Kingdom
| New constituency | Member of Parliament for South East Lancashire; 1868 – 1874; With: Algernon Egerton | Succeeded by Algernon Egerton and Edward Hardcastle |
