= James Cosmo Melvill (naturalist) =

British naturalist (1845–1929)

James Cosmo Melvill FLS FZS
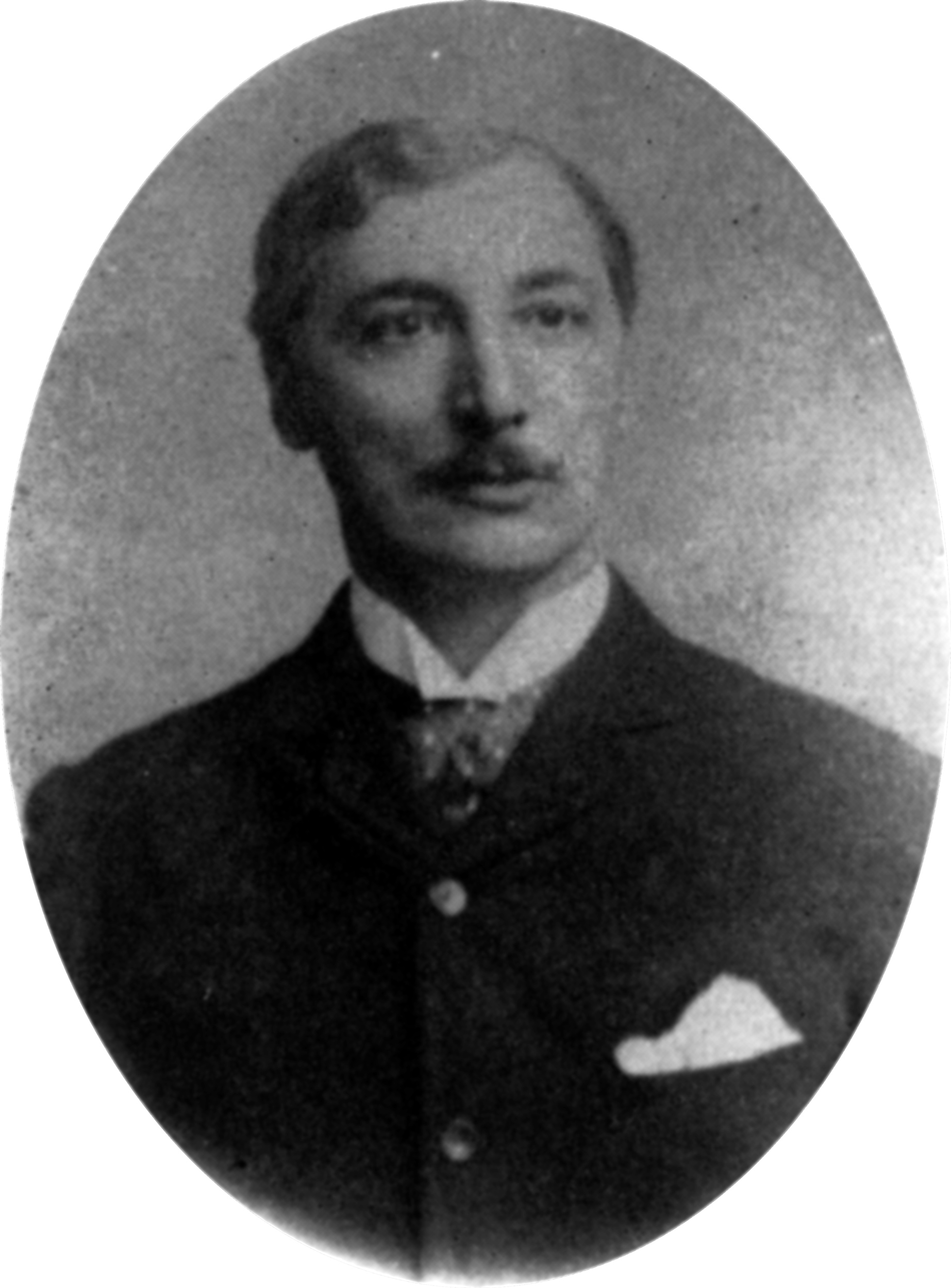
- James Cosmo Melvill
- Born: 1 July 1845; Hampstead, London
- Died: 4 November 1929 (aged 84); Meole Brace, Shrewsbury
- Education: Harrow School; Trinity College, Cambridge (MA)
- Occupations: Botanist; Malacologist
- Spouse: Bertha Dewhurst
- Children: 6
- Relatives: James Cosmo Melvill (grandfather)

James Cosmo Melvill (1 July 1845 – 4 November 1929) was a British botanist and malacologist who collected plants in Europe and North America.

== Family ==
Melvill was born at Hampstead, London, on 1 July 1845. He was a grandson of British administrator in India, Sir James Cosmo Melvill (1792–1861), his father being the latter's second son, also James Cosmo Melvill (1821–1880), onetime assistant Under-Secretary of state for India. His mother was Eliza Jane, daughter of Alfred Hardcastle of Hatcham House, Surrey.

Melvill married on 30 July 1874, Bertha, daughter of George C. Dewhurst of Lymm, Cheshire and Aberuchill Castle, Perthshire, Scotland. The couple had two sons and four daughters.

== Education and career ==
Melvill was educated at Harrow School, and Trinity College, Cambridge, which he entered in 1864. He graduated Bachelor of Arts (BA) in 1864, and Master of Arts (MA) in 1871. in later life he became an honorary Doctor of Science (DSc) from Manchester University in 1908.

His natural history interests were never professional. He went into business in the Lancashire cotton industry, first in the cotton merchant business of his uncle Edward Hardcastle (who was also MP for South East Lancashire and later Salford North) from 1871, then in 1887 became director of the firm of Messrs G. and R. Dewhurst Ltd, of Manchester, Preston and London, East India and China cotton merchants. He retired in 1904 but resumed his directorship of the latter firm because of the enlistments of his sons and other staff, during the time of the First World War.

Mevill also became a governor of Manchester University and Manchester Grammar School. He was President of the Manchester Literary and Philosophical Society from 1897 to 1899. Politically he was a supporter of the Conservative Party but despite posthumous claims he was onetime Member of Parliament for Salford South he neither served in Parliament nor contested the Salford seats as a parliamentary candidate at general elections.

By 1904 he settled in Shropshire at Meole Hall, Meole Brace near Shrewsbury, in which village he served as Churchwarden of the parish church and whose Parochial Church Council was formed on his proposal. Elsewhere within Shropshire he became a governor of the Royal Salop Infirmary, an honorary curator of Shrewsbury Museum and president of the Caradoc and Severn Valley Field Club.

== Natural history activities ==
Melvill collected shells from the age of eight and ultimately possessed a collection representing 25,500 species of mollusc, including a thousand new species from the Persian Gulf and South Africa.

His botanical collection, which included specimens assembled by other botanists, was one of the largest private herbaria in the country and was kept in a special building in his garden at Meole Hall. It was said to amount to three-quarters of the known plants in the world, especially grasses and ferns, most of which he gave to Manchester University. He presented that of British ferns and grasses to Harrow School, a collection later transferred to the National Botanic Garden of Wales. The Manchester Herbarium contains contributions from Melvill among other botanists.

He also had an extensive entomological collection of British butterflies, wasps, flies, and dragonflies.

While at school he was joint author, with the Honourable F. Bridgeman, of Flora of Harrow School, published in 1864. He published many natural history papers in his lifetime. He was a Fellow of the Linnean Society (elected in 1870) and the Zoological Society of London (elected in 1898) and onetime president of the Conchological Society of Great Britain, as well as president of the Manchester Conchological Society in 1889 and 1895–96. From 1904 to 1914 he was President of the Shrewsbury-based Caradoc and Severn Valley Field Club and in 1908 was appointed chairman of its committee to publish a Flora of Shropshire, a project which was shelved due to lack of sufficient financial support in 1913.

The World Register of Marine Species mentions 881 marine taxa described by J.C. Melvill, many of which together with Robert Standen (1854–1925). Many of these have become synonyms.

The rein orchid variety "Habenaria melvillii" was botanically named for him.

== Death ==
Towards the end of his life Melvill was incapacitated by a fall which dislocated his shoulder. He died at Meole Hall on 4 November 1929 and was buried on 7 November in Shrewsbury General Cemetery in Longden Road.

Professional and academic associations
Preceded by Henry Edward Schunck	President of the Manchester Literary and Philosophical Society; 1897–99	Succeeded by Sir Horace Lamb
