= Agnew baronets of Great Stanhope Street (1895) =

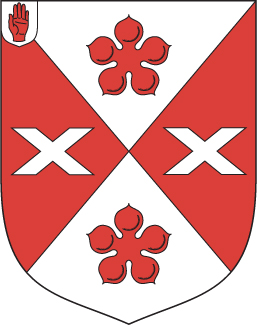
Escutcheon of the Agnew baronets of Great Stanhope Street

The Agnew baronetcy of Great Stanhope Street, London, was created on 2 September 1895 for the art dealer and politician William Agnew, of Thomas Agnew & Sons. He was Member of Parliament for South East Lancashire from 1880 to 1885, and for Stretford from 1885 to 1886.

== Agnew baronets of Great Stanhope Street, London (1895) ==
- Sir William Agnew, 1st Baronet (1825–1910)
- Sir George William Agnew, 2nd Baronet (1852–1941)
- Sir John Stuart Agnew, 3rd Baronet TD JP DL (16 September 1879 – 27 August 1957). Agnew was the son of Sir George William Agnew, 2nd Baronet and Fanny Bolton, and was educated at Rugby and Trinity College, Cambridge. He rose to the rank of Major in the Suffolk Yeomanry, fought in the First World War, and was awarded the Territorial Decoration. He was also deputy lieutenant and justice of the peace for West Suffolk. Agnew married Kathleen White, daughter of Isaac William Hewitt White, on 14 April 1910. They had three sons: Sir John Anthony Stuart Agnew, 4th Baronet; Sir George Keith Agnew, 5th Baronet; Stephen William Agnew (1921–2001).
- Sir John Anthony Stuart Agnew, 4th Baronet (1914–1993)
- Sir George Keith Agnew, 5th Baronet (1918–1994)
- Sir John Keith Agnew, 6th Baronet (19 December 1950 – 2011). Agnew was the son of Sir George Keith Agnew, 5th Baronet, and his wife Baroness Anne Merete Louise Schaffalitzky de Muckadell (1924–2005). He was the owner of the Rougham estates in Suffolk, England. Agnew was educated at Gresham's School, Holt, from 1964 to 1969 and then at the Royal Agricultural College, Cirencester. He succeeded in the baronetcy in 1994. The Rougham estates include Rougham Airfield, where Agnew organizes a wide variety of annual fairs, rallies and events, including the Wings, Wheels & Steam Country Fair, the annual Rougham Air Display & Harvest Fair, and the East Anglian Medieval Battle & Fair. A Rougham Music Festival, of which Agnew's brother George Agnew is the Arts Director, is also held on the estate. Sir John Agnew of Rougham should not be confused with his cousin John Stuart Agnew of Rougham, farmer, a parliamentary candidate of the UK Independence Party.
- Sir George Anthony Agnew, 7th Baronet (born 18 August 1953). He was educated at Gresham's School and the University of East Anglia.

The heir presumptive is the present holder's cousin John Stewart Agnew (born 1949).

== Notes ==
Baronetage of the United Kingdom
Preceded by Naylor-Leyland baronets	Agnew baronets of Great Stanhope Street; 2 September 1895	Succeeded by Renals baronets
