= Rowsom =

Rowsom is a surname. Notable people with the surname include:

- Brian Rowsom (born 1965), American basketball player and coach
- Mark Rowsom (born 1959), Canadian pair skater

== See also ==
- Rowson
