= Thomas Greenall =

British politician (1857–1937)

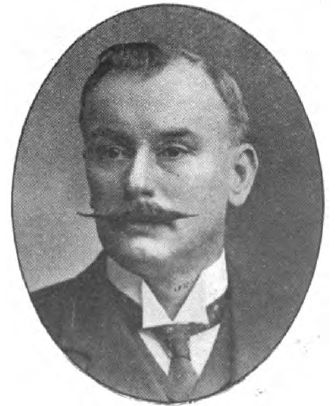
Greenall, about 1905

Thomas Greenall (5 May 1857 – 22 December 1937) was a British Labour Party politician. He was the Member of Parliament (MP) for Farnworth in Lancashire from 1922 to 1929.

Born at Tarbock in Lancashire, Greenall began working at the age of nine. He followed his father in working as a coal miner for twenty years, then became a full-time agent for the Lancashire and Cheshire Miners' Federation (LCMF).

In 1906, Greenall became president of the LCMF, and he served on the executive of the Miners' Federation of Great Britain, and as vice-president of the Lancashire, Cheshire and North Staffordshire Miners' Wages Board.

Greenall stood unsuccessfully for Labour in Leigh at the January 1910 United Kingdom general election, and then in Farnworth at the 1918 United Kingdom general election. He won the seat in 1922, serving until 1929, when he retired.

Trade union offices
Preceded by Sam Woods	President of the Lancashire and Cheshire Miners' Federation; 1906 – 1929	Succeeded by John McGurk
Preceded by James Andrew Seddon and Robert Smillie	Trades Union Congress representative to the American Federation of Labour; 1913; With: Ivor Gwynne	Succeeded by Charles Ammon and Ernest Bevin
Parliament of the United Kingdom
Preceded by Edward Bagley	Member of Parliament for Farnworth; 1922 – 1929	Succeeded by Guy Rowson
