= Rowdon =

Rowdon is a surname. Notable people with the surname include:

- George Rowdon (1914–1987), British cricketer
- Wade Rowdon (born 1960), American baseball player

== See also ==
- Rowson
