= Radcliffe-cum-Farnworth =

Parliamentary constituency in the United Kingdom, 1885–1918

- Former borough constituency for the House of Commons

1885–1918
- Seats: one
- Created from: South East Lancashire
- Replaced by: Heywood and Radcliffe, Farnworth

Radcliffe-cum-Farnworth was a parliamentary constituency centred on the towns of Radcliffe and Farnworth in Lancashire. It returned one Member of Parliament (MP) to the House of Commons of the Parliament of the United Kingdom, elected by the first past the post system.

== History ==
This area had previously been represented as part of South East Lancashire division. Under the Redistribution of Seats Act 1885, the constituency was created for the 1885 general election and was abolished for the 1918 general election.

== Boundaries ==
The South East Lancashire, Radcliffe-cum-Farnworth Division was defined in the 1885 legislation as consisting of the parishes of Farnworth, Kearsley, Little Hulton and Pilkington (including Whitefield and Unsworth) and the parish of Radcliffe except the area in the Municipal Borough of Bury.

At the next redistribution of seats in 1918, the constituency was split between two new seats: Farnworth (which included Little Hulton and Kearsley) and Heywood and Radcliffe (which took in Unsworth and Whitefield).

== Members of Parliament ==
Election	Member	Party
1885	Robert Leake	Liberal
1895	John James Mellor	Conservative
1900	Theodore Taylor	Liberal
1918	constituency abolished: see Heywood and Radcliffe & Farnworth	

== Elections ==
Decades:	1880s; 1890s; 1900s; 1910s

=== Elections in the 1880s ===
General election 1885: Radcliffe-cum-Farnworth
Party	Candidate	Votes	%	±%
Liberal	Robert Leake	5,092	52.7	
Conservative	William Hulton	4,579	47.3	
Majority		513	5.4	
Turnout		9,671	92.7	
Registered electors		10,433		
Liberal win (new seat)				

General election 1886: Radcliffe-cum-Farnworth
Party	Candidate	Votes	%	±%
Liberal	Robert Leake	4,695	50.7	−2.0
Conservative	Frederick Milner	4,559	49.3	+2.0
Majority		136	1.4	−4.0
Turnout		9,254	88.7	−4.0
Registered electors		10,433		
Liberal hold		Swing	-2.0	

=== Elections in the 1890s ===
Mellor

General election 1892: Radcliffe-cum-Farnworth
Party	Candidate	Votes	%	±%
Liberal	Robert Leake	4,999	50.5	−0.2
Conservative	John James Mellor	4,904	49.5	+0.2
Majority		95	1.0	−0.4
Turnout		9,903	92.7	+4.0
Registered electors		10,686		
Liberal hold		Swing	-0.2	

Pollard

General election 1895: Radcliffe-cum-Farnworth
Party	Candidate	Votes	%	±%
Conservative	John James Mellor	5,523	52.9	+3.4
Liberal	George Pollard	4,923	47.1	−3.4
Majority		600	5.8	N/A
Turnout		10,446	92.8	+0.1
Registered electors		11,259		
Conservative gain from Liberal		Swing	+3.4	

=== Elections in the 1900s ===
Taylor

General election 1900: Radcliffe-cum-Farnworth
Party	Candidate	Votes	%	±%
Liberal	Theodore Taylor	5,497	50.3	+3.2
Conservative	J.C. Cross	5,437	49.7	−3.2
Majority		60	0.6	N/A
Turnout		10,834	89.3	−3.5
Registered electors		12,244		
Liberal gain from Conservative		Swing	+3.2	

General election 1906: Radcliffe-cum-Farnworth
Party	Candidate	Votes	%	±%
Liberal	Theodore Taylor	6,719	56.8	+6.5
Conservative	S. Musgrave	5,117	43.2	−6.5
Majority		1,602	13.6	+13.0
Turnout		11,836	90.0	+0.7
Registered electors		13,151		
Liberal hold		Swing	+6.5	

=== Elections in the 1910s ===
General election January 1910: Radcliffe-cum-Farnworth
Party	Candidate	Votes	%	±%
Liberal	Theodore Taylor	7,367	55.8	−1.0
Conservative	Edward White	5,827	44.2	+1.0
Majority		1,540	11.6	−2.0
Turnout		13,194	93.9	+3.9
Registered electors		14,046		
Liberal hold		Swing	-1.0	

General election December 1910: Radcliffe-cum-Farnworth
Party	Candidate	Votes	%	±%
Liberal	Theodore Taylor	6,721	53.1	−2.7
Conservative	Edward Bagley	5,937	46.9	+2.7
Majority		784	6.2	−5.4
Turnout		12,658	90.1	−3.8
Registered electors		14,046		
Liberal hold		Swing	-2.7	

General Election 1914–15:

Another General Election was required to take place before the end of 1915. The political parties had been making preparations for an election to take place and by July 1914, the following candidates had been selected;

- Liberal: Theodore Taylor
- Unionist:

== Sources ==
- South Lancashire constituencies map, including Radcliffe-cum-Farnworth.
- Leigh Rayment's Historical List of MPs – Constituencies beginning with "R" (part 1)
