= 1938 Farnworth by-election =

UK Parliamentary by-election

The 1938 Farnworth by-election was held on 27 January 1938. The by-election was held due to the death of the incumbent Labour MP, Guy Rowson. It was won by the Labour candidate George Tomlinson.

Farnworth by-election, 1938
Party	Candidate	Votes	%	±%
Labour	George Tomlinson	24,298	59.1	+7.4
Conservative	Herbert F. Ryan	16,835	40.9	+1.4
Majority		7,463	18.2	+6.0
Turnout		41,133	77.9	−4.5
Labour hold		Swing	+3.0	
