= John Roper, Baron Roper =

British politician (1935–2016)

The Right Honourable The Lord Roper PC
- Roper in 2014

Chief Whip of the Liberal Democrats in the House of Lords
- In office 7 June 2001 – 5 May 2005
- Leader: Charles Kennedy
- Preceded by: The Lord Harris of Greenwich
- Succeeded by: The Lord Shutt of Greetland

Director, Institute for Security Studies of Western European Union
- In office April 1990 – September 1995

Chief Whip, Social Democrat Party
- In office 26 March 1981 – 9 June 1983
- Leader: Roy Jenkins
- Preceded by: Office Created
- Succeeded by: John Cartwright

Member of Parliament for Farnworth
- In office 18 June 1970 – 9 June 1983
- Preceded by: Ernest Thornton
- Succeeded by: Constituency abolished

Member of the House of Lords
- Lord Temporal
- Life peerage 12 May 2000 – 23 May 2015

Personal details
- Born: John Francis Hodgess Roper; 10 September 1935
- Died: 29 January 2016 (aged 80)
- Party: Liberal Democrats
- Other political affiliations: Labour Co-operative (1970–1981); Social Democratic Party (1981–1988)
- Spouse: Hope Edwards (m. 1959; died 2003)
- Children: 1
- Education: Magdalen College, Oxford; University of Chicago

John Francis Hodgess Roper, Baron Roper PC (10 September 1935 – 29 January 2016) was a British Liberal Democrat politician.

== Early life and education ==
Roper was educated at William Hulme's Grammar School (Manchester), Reading School, Magdalen College, Oxford (studying Philosophy, Politics and Economics (PPE) and the University of Chicago. He began his career as an economics lecturer at the University of Manchester.

== Political career ==
Roper first stood for Parliament for High Peak as a Labour candidate at the 1964 general election, but the Conservative David Walder retained the marginal seat. He was elected Member of Parliament for Farnworth at the 1970 general election. In 1972 he acted as an unofficial whip for pro-European Labour MPs to help pass the Heath government's European Communities Act.

He sat as a Labour Co-operative MP (1970–81) and for the Social Democratic Party (SDP) from 1981 to 1983, when he was also the party's Chief Whip. His Farnworth seat was subsequently abolished, and he contested Worsley (which contained parts of the abolished Farnworth constituency) in the 1983 general election, finishing third in a three-way marginal.

== House of Lords ==
On 12 May 2000, he was created a Life peer as Baron Roper, of Thorney Island in the City of Westminster. He was the Liberal Democrat Chief Whip in the House of Lords until 2005. He was subsequently appointed to the Privy Council of the United Kingdom. In 2008, he was elected Principal Deputy Chairman of Committees. He retired from the House of Lords on 23 May 2015.

== Allegations ==
=== Stasi allegations ===
Roper was wrongfully accused by author Anthony Glees of having been a Stasi "agent of some influence" during his time at Chatham House.

Roper rejected the charges and said that he was engaged in building bridges with East Germany in the 1980s as part of a Foreign Office-approved policy of thawing relations. "He was deceived, he says, about the background of an undercover Stasi officer he employed as a research fellow when he was director of studies at Chatham House".

== Personal life ==
Roper was married to Hope Edwards from 1959 until her death in 2003. She was the daughter of John Edwards, a former Health and Treasury Minister under Clement Attlee. They had one daughter, Kate Stewart Roper (originally Kate Roper). He also had 3 grandchildren.

Parliament of the United Kingdom
Preceded by Ernest Thornton	Member of Parliament for Farnworth; 1970–1983	Constituency abolished
Party political offices
Preceded by Giles Radice	Treasurer of the Fabian Society; 1976–1981	Succeeded by Brian Abel-Smith
