= William Entwisle =

British Conservative politician

Member of Parliament for South Lancashire
- In office 24 May 1844 – 4 August 1847 Serving with William Brown (1846–1847); Francis Egerton (1844–1846)
- Preceded by: Francis Egerton; Richard Bootle-Wilbraham
- Succeeded by: William Brown; Charles Pelham Villiers

Personal details
- Born: 30 September 1808 Manchester, England
- Died: 18 August 1865 (aged 56) Hanford, Dorset, England
- Party: Conservative
- Education: Trinity College, Cambridge

William Entwisle (30 September 1808 – 18 August 1865) was a British Conservative politician.

Born in Manchester, Entwisle was the fourth son of Richard Entwisle. At age 19, he was admitted as a pensioner at Trinity College, Cambridge before matriculating in Michaelmas in 1827, and then becoming a scholar in 1830. He graduated as a Bachelor of Arts and as 20th wrangler in 1831, and as a Master of Arts in 1834. He was also admitted to Lincoln's Inn in 1831, and was called to the Bar in 1836.

He became an honorary Doctor of Civil Law at the University of Oxford in 1844, and was also a chairman of the Manchester and Leeds Railway Company, and a partner at banking firm Loyd, Entwisle, Bury and Jervis, now part of the Royal Bank of Scotland. At some point, he married Hannah Loyd, daughter of Edward Loyd, a banker at the firm, and they had at least one son, named William.

He was elected Conservative Member of Parliament for South Lancashire at a by-election in 1844—caused by the death of Richard Bootle-Wilbraham— and held the seat until 1847 when he did not seek re-election.

Entwisle died in 1865 at Hanford, near Blandford in Dorset.

Parliament of the United Kingdom
| Preceded by Francis Egerton; Richard Bootle-Wilbraham | Member of Parliament for South Lancashire; 1844–1847; With: William Brown (1846–1847); Francis Egerton (1844–1846) | Succeeded by William Brown; Charles Pelham Villiers |
