= Renals baronets =

Baronetcy in the Baronetage of the United Kingdom

Escutcheon of the Renals baronets of the City of London

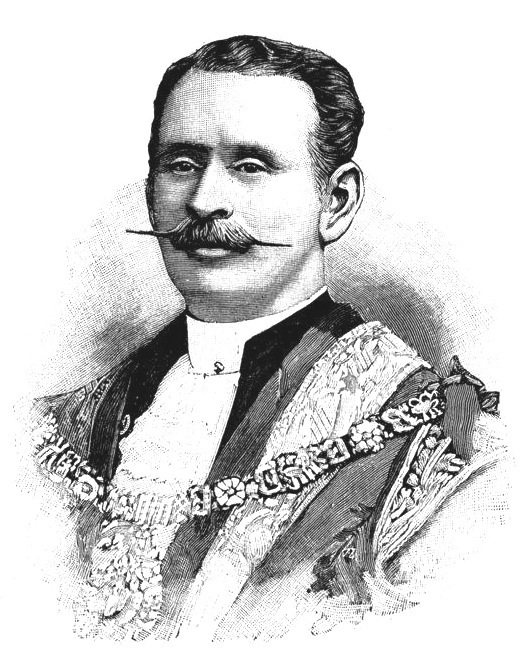
Sir Joseph Renals in 1895.

The Renals Baronetcy, of the City of London, is a title in the Baronetage of the United Kingdom. It was created on 4 September 1895 for Joseph Renals. He was a partner in the firm of Renals & Co, merchants, and served as Lord Mayor of London from 1894 to 1895.

== Renals baronets (1895) ==
- Sir Joseph Renals, 1st Baronet (1843–1908)
- Sir James Herbert Renals, 2nd Baronet (1870–1927))
- Sir Herbert Renals, 3rd Baronet (1919–1961)
- Sir Stanley Renals, 4th Baronet (1923–2020)
- Sir Stanley Michael Renals, 5th Baronet (born 1958)

The heir apparent and sole heir is the present holder's son, Lloyd James Renals (born 1985).

Baronetage of the United Kingdom
Preceded by Agnew baronets	Renals baronets of the City of London; 4 September 1895	Succeeded by Forwood baronets
