= Sir William Brown, 1st Baronet, of Richmond Hill =

British politician (1784–1864)

Sir William Brown Bt DL
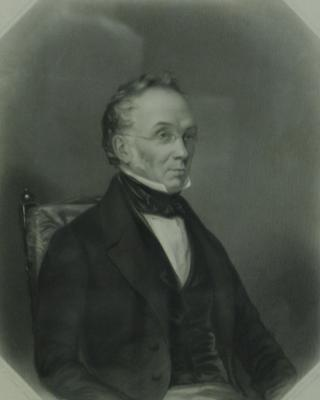
- Sir William Brown, 1846

Member of Parliament for South Lancashire
- In office 1846 – 23 April 1859
- Preceded by: Lord Francis Egerton; William Entwisle
- Succeeded by: Algernon Fulke Egerton; William John Legh

Personal details
- Born: 30 May 1784; Ballymena, Ireland
- Died: 3 March 1864 (aged 79); Liverpool, Lancashire, England
- Political party: Liberal
- Spouse: Sarah Gihon (m. 1810; died 1858)
- Relations: James Clifton Brown (grandson); Sir Alexander Brown, Bt (grandson); George Brown (brother); John Crosby Brown (nephew)

Sir William Brown, 1st Baronet DL (30 May 1784 – 3 March 1864) was a British merchant and banker, founder of the banking-house of Brown, Shipley & Co. and a Liberal politician who sat in the House of Commons from 1846 to 1859.

== Early life ==
Brown was born at Ballymena, County Antrim, Northern Ireland on 30 May 1784. He was the eldest son of Alexander Brown of Ballymena, and Grace, daughter of John Davison (1764–1834) of Drumnasole. His younger brothers were George Brown (1787–1859), John Brown (1788–1852), and James Brown (1791–1877).

At twelve years of age, he was sent with his brothers to be educated at the school of the Rev. J. Bradley at Catterick, North Yorkshire, until 1800 when he returned to Ireland.

== Career ==
Soon afterwards he sailed with his father and mother for the United States of America, and at Baltimore, Maryland, where his father continued the linen trade in which he had been engaged in Ireland, received in the counting-house his commercial education. In a few years the house at Baltimore became the firm of Alexander Brown & Sons, consisting of the father and his sons, William, John, George, and James. James established himself at New York City and John at Philadelphia, and on the death of their father the business, then the most extensive in the American trade, was continued by the four brothers, George remaining in Baltimore.

In 1809, William returned to the United Kingdom, established a branch of the firm in Liverpool, and they shortly afterwards abandoned the exclusive linen business and became general merchants. The transactions of the firm soon extended so as to require further branches, Brown took on a partner, and the firm became known as Brown, Shipley & Co., Liverpool and London merchants. Brown, at one time, served as the chairman of the Atlantic Telegraph Company.

The disastrous aspect of affairs in financial crisis of 1837 induced the brothers George and John, who had by this time realised ample fortunes, to retire from the firm, leaving William the eldest and James the youngest to continue the concern. Brown persuaded the Bank of England to advance him £2,000,000 to tide matters over in view of the firm's multiple interests. Brown only needed half the amount, which he repaid within six months. His business, both mercantile and banking, continued to increase, and in 1844 he held one sixth of the trade between Great Britain and the United States. "There is hardly," declared Richard Cobden at this period, "a wind that blows, or a tide that flows in the Mersey, that does not bring a ship freighted with cotton or some other costly commodity for Mr Brown's house." They now became bankers in the sense of conducting transmissions of money on public account between the two hemispheres, and in this pursuit and the business of merchants they acquired immense wealth.

=== Political career ===
In 1825, William took an active part in the agitation for the reform in the management of the Liverpool docks. He was elected an alderman of Liverpool in 1831, and held that office until 1838. He was the unsuccessful Anti-Cornlaw League candidate for South Lancashire in 1844.

In 1846, Brown was elected Liberal M.P. for South Lancashire, and held the seat until 23 April 1859. In 1856, friction arose between the British and American governments because British consuls were enlisting recruits for the Crimean War, but this was largely allayed by Brown, who in an interview with Lord Palmerston, then prime-minister, explained the objections taken in America. In 1863, he was selected as High Sheriff of Lancashire.

He was always an advocate of free trade, and particularly favoured the idea of a decimal currency. Sir W. Brown was the author of a pamphlet entitled Decimal Coinage. A Letter from W. Brown, Esq., M.P., to Francis Shand, Esq., Chairman of the Liverpool Chamber of Commerce, 1854.

=== Philanthropy ===
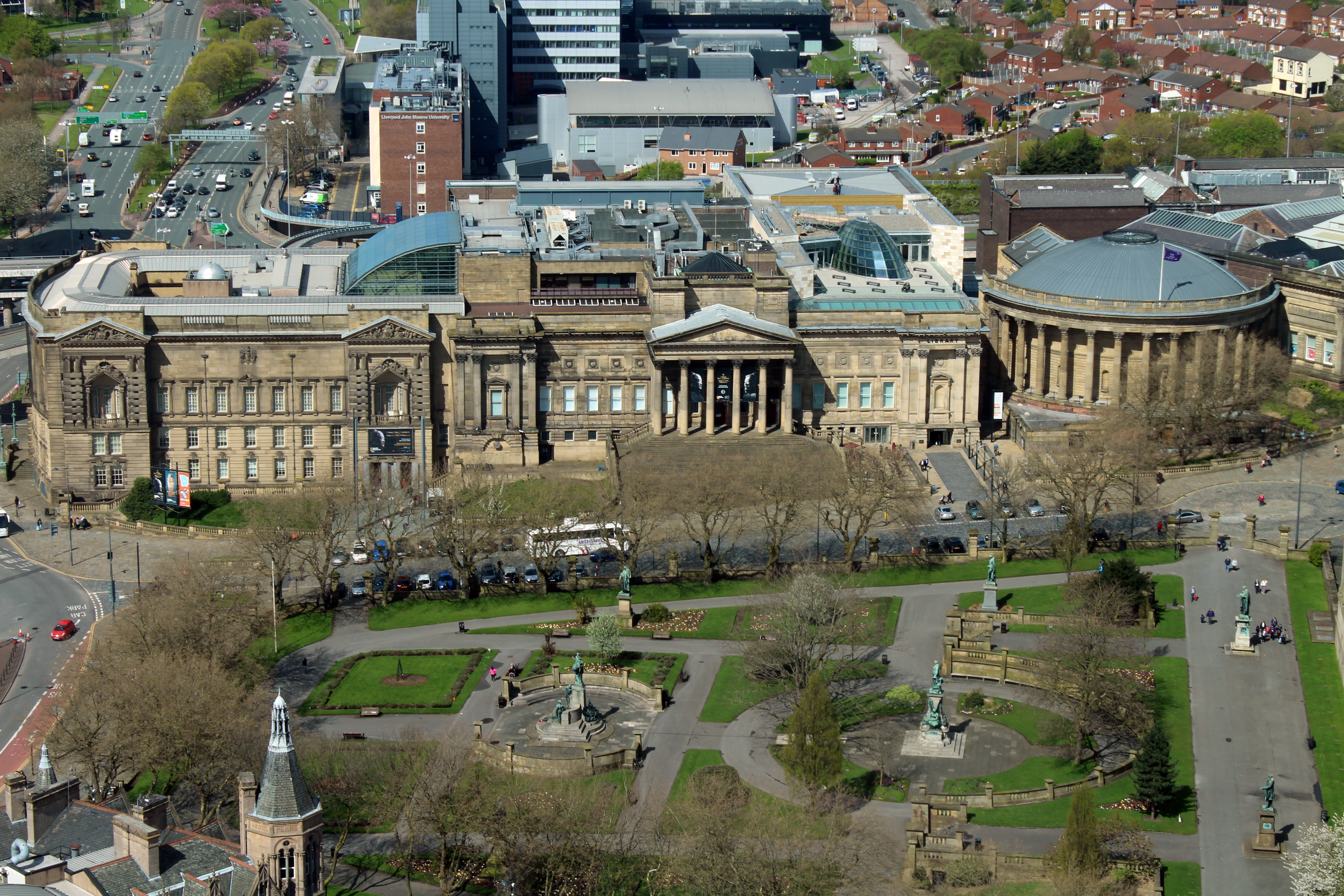
William Brown Street

His name is probably best known by the munificent gift which he bestowed on his adopted town. He erected the Free Public Library and Derby Museum at Liverpool, which was opened on 8 October 1860, at a cost to himself of £40,000, the corporation providing the site and foundation and furnishing the building.

At the inauguration of the volunteer movement in 1859, he raised and equipped at his own expense a corps of artillery, which ranked as the 1st Lancashire Artillery Volunteers.

== Personal life ==
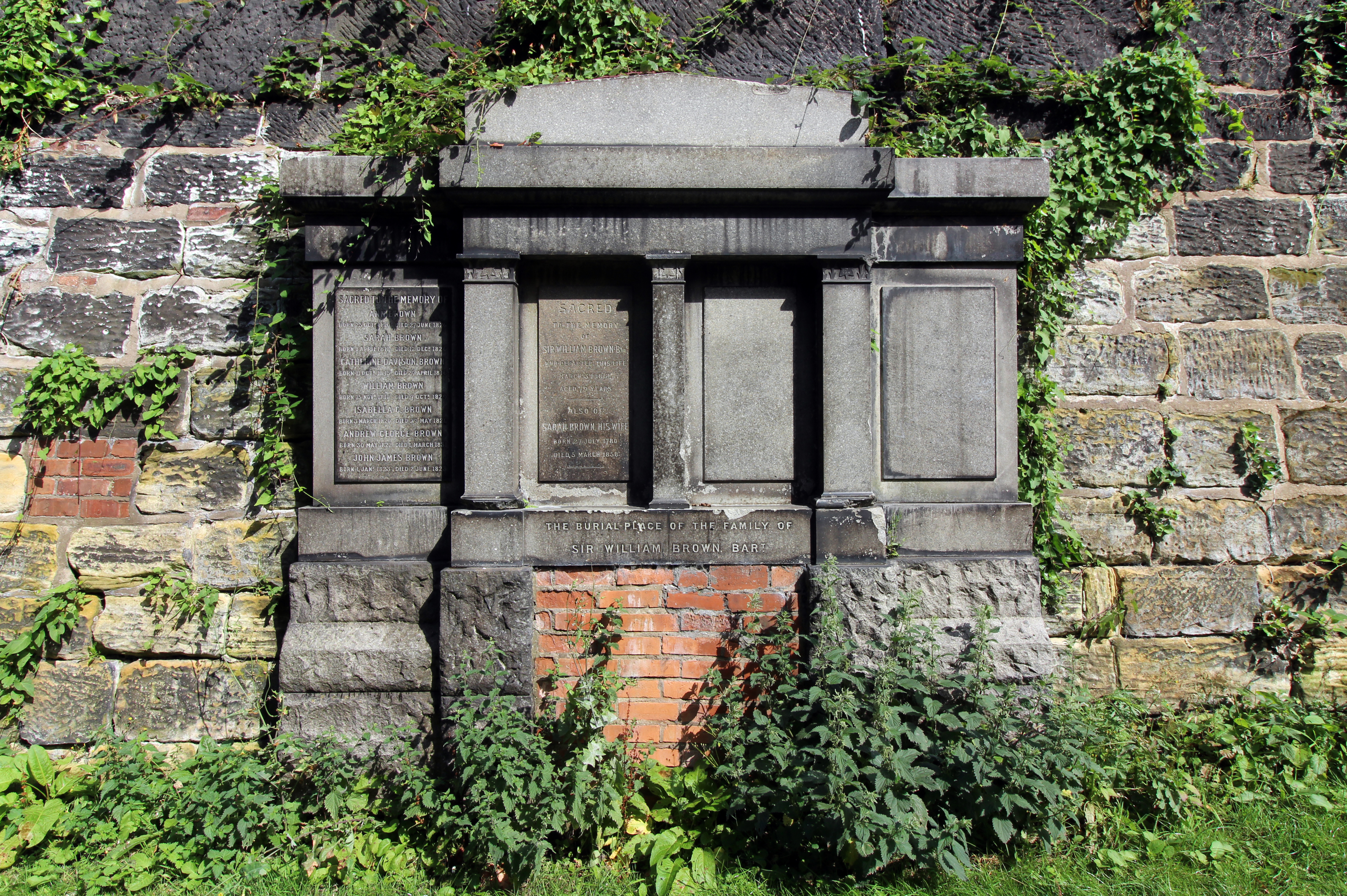
Brown's family vault in St James's Gardens

On 1 January 1810, he married Sarah Gihon (1780–1858), daughter of Andrew Gihon, Esq. of Ballymena, a magistrate of that shire. Before her death on 5 March 1858, they were the parents of two children, a daughter and a son:

- Grace Brown (1812–1849), who married John Hargreaves of Hall Barn, Buckinghamshire, in 1831.
- Alexander Brown (1817–1849), who married his cousin, Sarah Benedict Brown, daughter of Sir William's youngest brother, James Brown.

He was created a baronet of Richmond Hill in the County Palatine of Lancaster on 24 January 1863. He did not, however, live long to enjoy his honours, as he died at Richmond Hill, Liverpool, on 3 March 1864. As his son died on 8 October 1849, Brown's grandson, Lieutenant-colonel William Richmond Brown, succeeded to the baronetcy in 1864. On the proving of his will on 21 May 1864, the personalty was sworn under £900,000.

=== Descendants ===
Through his son Alexander, he was a grandfather of Lt. Col. Sir William Richmond Brown, 2nd Baronet, who served as High Sheriff of Northamptonshire in 1873; James Clifton Brown (1841–1917), a Member of Parliament for Newbury; Sir Alexander Hargreaves Brown, 1st Baronet (1844–1922), the Liberal Party, and later Liberal Unionist, politician who sat in the House of Commons from 1868 to 1906; and Louisa Brown Cobham.

Parliament of the United Kingdom
Preceded by Lord Francis Egerton; William Entwisle	Member of Parliament for South Lancashire; 1846 – 1859; With: William Entwisle, 1846–1847; Charles Pelham Villiers, 1847; Alexander Henry, 1847–1852; John Cheetham, 1852–1859	Succeeded by Algernon Fulke Egerton; William John Legh
Honorary titles
Preceded by William Allen Francis Saunders	High Sheriff of Lancashire; 1864	Succeeded by James Kay-Shuttleworth
Baronetage of the United Kingdom
New creation	Baronet (of Richmond Hill); 1863–1864	Succeeded by William Richmond Brown
