= Charles Molyneux, 3rd Earl of Sefton =

British politician (1796–1855)

The Right Honourable The Earl of Sefton
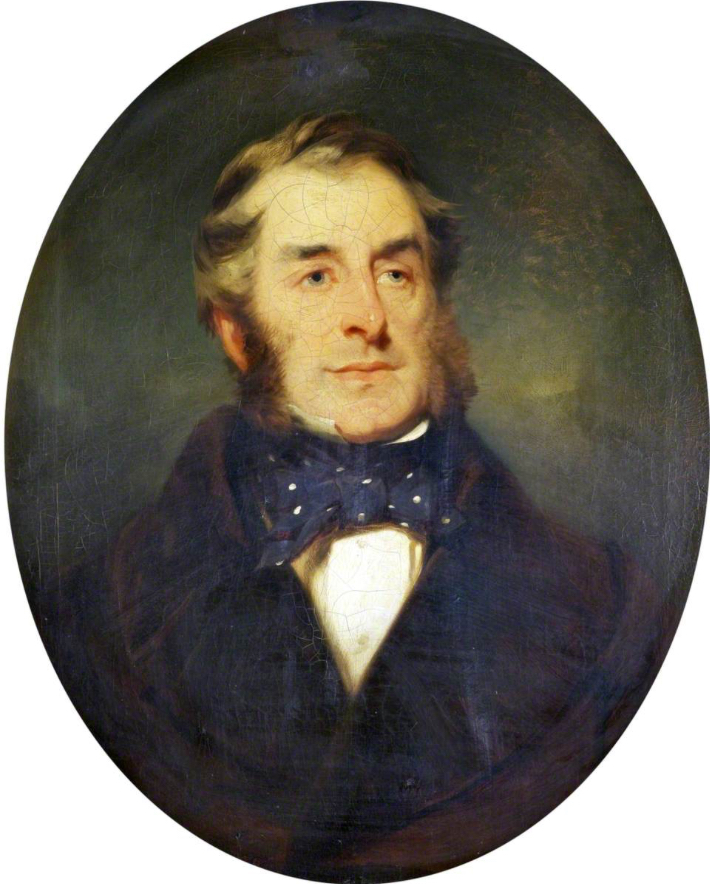
- Portrait of Molyneux, c. 1850

Member of Parliament for Lancashire South
- In office 1832–1835
- Monarch: William IV
- Succeeded by: Lord Francis Egerton; Richard Bootle Wilbraham

Personal details
- Born: Charles William Molyneux; 10 July 1796
- Died: 2 August 1855 (aged 59)
- Party: Whig
- Spouse: Mary Augusta Gregg-Hopwood
- Children: 5, including William

Charles William Molyneux, 3rd Earl of Sefton (10 July 1796 – 2 August 1855), styled Lord Molyneux (or Viscount Molyneux until 1838), was a British Whig politician.

== Background ==
Sefton was the eldest son of William Molyneux, 2nd Earl of Sefton, and the Hon. Maria Margaret, daughter of William Craven, 6th Baron Craven.

== Political career ==
Sefton was returned to Parliament for Lancashire South in 1832, a seat he held until 1835. In 1838 he succeeded his father in the earldom and took his seat in the House of Lords. Between 1851 and 1855 he served as Lord Lieutenant of Lancashire.

== Family ==
Lord Sefton married Mary Augusta, daughter of Robert Gregg-Hopwood, in 1834. They had several children. He died in August 1855, aged 59, and was succeeded by his eldest son, William.

The family seats were: Croxteth Hall, Lancashire; Stoke Farm, now called Sefton Park in Stoke Poges, Buckinghamshire; and Sefton House (later known as Seaford House) in Belgrave Square, London.

Parliament of the United Kingdom
New constituency	Member of Parliament for Lancashire South; 1832–1835; With: George William Wood	Succeeded by Lord Francis Egerton; Richard Bootle Wilbraham
Honorary titles
Preceded by The Earl of Derby	Lord Lieutenant of Lancashire; 1851–1855	Succeeded by The Earl of Ellesmere
Peerage of Ireland
Preceded by William Philip Molyneux	Earl of Sefton; 1838–1855	Succeeded by William Philip Molyneux
Professional and academic associations
Preceded by Francis, 1st Earl of Ellesmere	President of the Historic Society of Lancashire and Cheshire; 1854–55	Succeeded by Edward Cust
