= Ernest Thornton =

British politician (1905–1992)

Ernest Thornton (18 May 1905 – 5 February 1992) was a British Labour Party politician. He was elected Member of Parliament (MP) for Farnworth in a 1952 by-election, and served until his retirement at the 1970 general election. His successor John Roper retained the seat for the Labour Party.

Parliament of the United Kingdom
Preceded by George Tomlinson	Member of Parliament for Farnworth; 1952–1970	Succeeded by John Roper
Trade union offices
Preceded by James H. Holden	General Secretary of the Rochdale Weavers' Association; 1929–1964	Succeeded by R. W. Hill?
Preceded by Cephas Speak	Secretary of the United Textile Factory Workers' Association; 1943–1953	Succeeded by Harold Bradley
Preceded by Harold Bradley	President of the Amalgamated Weavers' Association; 1960–1964	Succeeded by Fred Hague
