= John James Mellor =

British industrialist and Conservative politician

Mellor in 1895.

Colonel John James Mellor (12 August 1830 – 12 January 1916) was a British industrialist and Conservative politician.

== Early life ==
Mellor was born in Oldham, Lancashire, and was educated privately.

== Business and military ==
He entered business as a cotton manufacturer and became chairman of J & J J Mellor Limited of Bury and Brook Mills Limited of Heywood. He was also involved in railway administration, and was a director of the Metropolitan Railway and the South Eastern Railway.

For twenty-seven years he held a commission in the Volunteer Force, retiring as honorary colonel of the 1st Volunteer Battalion of the Lancashire Fusiliers.

== Politics ==
In 1892 he stood as Conservative candidate for the Radcliffe cum Farnworth constituency, but failed to be elected. Robert Leake, the sitting Liberal MP stood down at the next general election in 1895. Mellor was again selected as Conservative candidate, and was elected as Member of Parliament, benefitting from both a large swing to the Conservatives and the fact that Leake had a large personal vote.

Mellor was only in the Commons for five years, deciding not to stand again. At the 1900 general election Radcliffe cum Farnworth was regained by the Liberals.

In 1908, he invited Viscount Ridley, who was the chairman for the Tariff Reform League to hold a large demonstration of the unionist party at Gwrych Castle, Ridley accepted and the event was held at 14 September.

Apart from his business and political activities, Mellor took an interest in science and engineering, and was a fellow of the Royal Astronomical Society for nearly sixty years.

== Family ==
He married Jennette Clegg in 1865, and they lived at The Woodland, Whitefield near Manchester.

Their son Walter Clifford Mellor was an ordained minister and leading member of the Neo-Jacobite Revival before the First World War. He married Lady Helen Stewart, the daughter of Randolph Stewart, 9th Earl of Galloway. She joined Walter in the Legitimist Jacobite League of Great Britain and Ireland.

== Notes ==
Parliament of the United Kingdom
Preceded by Robert Leake	Member of Parliament for Radcliffe cum Farnworth; 1895–1900	Succeeded by Theodore Taylor
