= 1952 Farnworth by-election =

UK Parliamentary by-election

The 1952 Farnworth by-election was held on 27 November 1952. The election was held due to the death of the incumbent Labour MP, George Tomlinson. It was won by the Labour candidate Ernest Thornton.

== Result ==
Farnworth by-election, 1952
Party	Candidate	Votes	%	±%
Labour	Ernest Thornton	21,834	59.90	+0.68
Conservative	D. H. Moore	14,615	40.10	−0.68
Majority		7,219	19.80	+1.36
Turnout		36,449		
Labour hold		Swing		

== Previous result ==
General election 1951: Farnworth
Party	Candidate	Votes	%	±%
Labour	George Tomlinson	26,297	59.22	
Conservative	J. Seddon	18,112	40.78	
Majority		8,185	18.44	
Turnout		44,409	86.75	
Labour hold		Swing		
