= Richard Bootle-Wilbraham =

British politician (1801–1844)

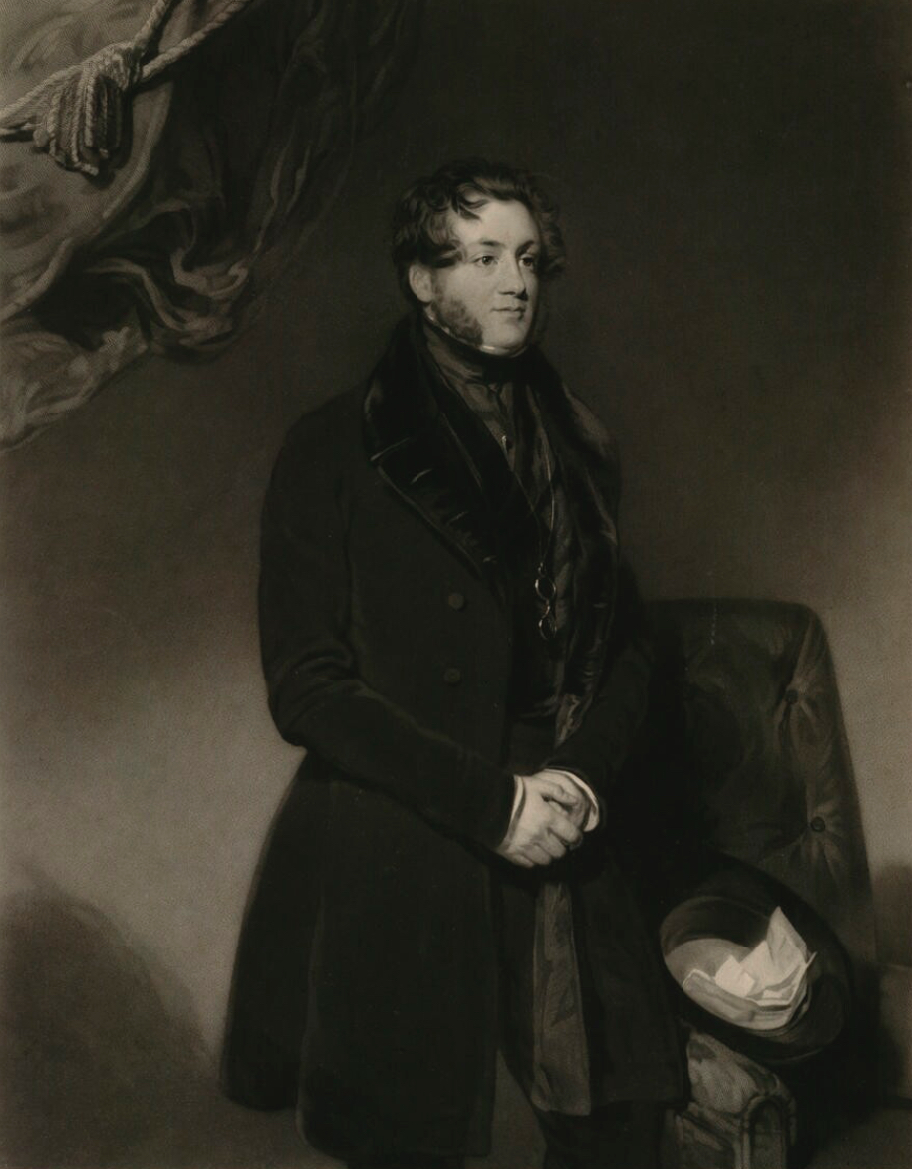
Portrait of Bootle-Wilbraham, 1839, published by Thomas Agnew & Sons

Richard Bootle-Wilbraham (27 October 1801 – 5 May 1844) was a British Conservative Party politician. He sat in the House of Commons from 1835 to 1844.

Bootle-Wilbraham was the oldest son of Edward Bootle-Wilbraham, 1st Baron Skelmersdale, and his wife Mary Elizabeth Taylor. He was educated at Eton and at Christ Church, Oxford, and lived with his family at Blythe Hall, Lathom, Lancashire, part of the Lathom estate owned by his family.

He was made a Deputy Lieutenant of Lancashire in 1826, and was elected at the 1835 general election as the Member of Parliament (MP) for South Lancashire. He was re-elected in 1837 and returned without a contest in 1841, and held the seat until his death from influenza in 1844, aged 42.

He married Jessy Brooke (1812–1892), the daughter of Sir Richard Brooke, 6th Baronet Brooke of Norton. They had one son, the Conservative politician Edward Bootle-Wilbraham, 1st Earl of Lathom, and four daughters; Adela Mary (b. 1834), Jessy Caroline (b. 1836), Edith (b. 1840) and Rose (b. 1842).

== Sources ==
- G. E. C. (G. E. Cokayne) ed. by George H. White. The Complete Peerage. (London: St. Catherine Press, 1953) Vol. XII, Part 1, p. 1.

Parliament of the United Kingdom
Preceded by Viscount Molyneux; George William Wood	Member of Parliament for South Lancashire; 1835–1844; With: Lord Francis Egerton	Succeeded by William Entwisle; Lord Francis Egerton
