= Robert Leake =

British Liberal politician

Robert Leake (1824 – 1 May 1901) was a British Liberal politician.

Leake was the eldest son of Robert Leake of Manchester and Mary Lockett of Salford, Lancashire. After a private education he became head of Lockett, Leake and Company, engravers to calico printers.

Leake became involved in Liberal politics in Manchester in the 1860s, and was over time president of the Manchester Liberal Association, the Manchester Reform Club and the Liberal Association of Salford. However, he declined to be a parliamentary candidate until the 1880 general election. In that year he was elected as Member of Parliament for the two-seat South East Lancashire Division, along with his cousin William Agnew.

The Redistribution of Seats Act 1885 divided the South East Lancashire seat into eight single-member constituencies. Leake was elected as the first MP for the new South East Lancashire, Radcliffe cum Farnworth Division. He was reelected in 1886 and 1892. Prior to the 1895 general election, Leake announced his decision to resign.

Leake made his residence at "The Dales", Whitefield, near Manchester. He was married twice.

Parliament of the United Kingdom
Preceded by Algernon Egerton and Edward Hardcastle	Member of Parliament for Lancashire South-East; 1880–1885; With: William Agnew 1880–1885	Constituency abolished
New constituency	Member of Parliament for Radcliffe cum Farnworth; 1885–1895	Succeeded by John James Mellor
