= George William Wood =

English politician (1781–1843)

George William Wood (21 July 1781 – 3 October 1843) was an English businessman, Member of Parliament and leading member of civil society in Manchester.

== Life ==
George William Wood was born in Leeds, the son of William Wood, a Unitarian minister who was Joseph Priestley's successor at the Mill Hill Chapel, amateur botanist and campaigner against the Test Acts. His mother was Louisa Ann née Oates, the daughter of a wealthy Leeds family.

Wood moved to Manchester around 1801 and was elected to membership of the Manchester Literary and Philosophical Society on 24 April 1807. He became a prominent businessman there. But, as a memorial in the Upper Brook Street Chapel cited, "having early in life engaged in commercial pursuits ... he quitted [sic] the pursuits of wealth for the nobler objects of public usefulness." He was member of parliament for Lancashire South from 1832 to 1835, and for Kendal from 1837 until his death. He was a prime mover in the establishment of both the Royal Manchester Institution and the Manchester Mechanics' Institute, and was one of the two inaugural vice-presidents of the Manchester Athenaeum.

He died suddenly of a stroke at a meeting of the Manchester Literary and Philosophical Society and was buried at the Upper Brook Street Chapel.

== Honours and offices ==
- Fellow of the Linnaean Society;
- Fellow of the Geological Society;
- Vice-president of the Manchester Literary and Philosophical Society.

== Bibliography ==
- Leigh Rayment's Peerage Pages
- Kargon, R. H. (1977). Science in Victorian Manchester: Enterprise and Expertise. Baltimore: Johns Hopkins University Press. ISBN 0-8018-1969-5.
- Wykes, D. L. (2004) "Wood, William (1745–1808)", Oxford Dictionary of National Biography, Oxford University Press. Retrieved 16 August 2007 (subscription required)

Parliament of the United Kingdom
New constituency	Member of Parliament for South Lancashire; 1832 – 1835; With: Viscount Molyneux	Succeeded by Lord Francis Egerton; Richard Bootle Wilbraham
Preceded by John Foster-Barham	Member of Parliament for Kendal; 1837 – 1843	Succeeded by Henry Warburton
