= George Tomlinson (British politician) =

British Labour politician (1890–1952)

The Right Honourable George Tomlinson MP

Minister of Education
- In office 7 February 1947 – 26 October 1951
- Prime Minister: Clement Attlee
- Preceded by: Ellen Wilkinson
- Succeeded by: Florence Horsbrugh

Minister of Works
- In office August 1945 – February 1947
- Prime Minister: Clement Attlee
- Preceded by: Duncan Sandys
- Succeeded by: Charles Key

Member of Parliament for Farnworth
- In office 1938–1952
- Preceded by: Guy Rowson
- Succeeded by: Ernest Thornton

Personal details
- Born: 21 March 1890 Rishton, Lancashire
- Died: 22 September 1952 (aged 62) Manor House Hospital, Golders Green, London
- Party: Labour
- Spouse(s): Ethel, née Pursell (m. 1914)
- Children: One daughter

George Tomlinson (21 March 1890 – 22 September 1952) was a British Labour Party politician.

== Biography ==
George Tomlinson was born at 55 Fielding Street in Rishton, Lancashire, the son of John Tomlinson, a cotton weaver, and his wife Alice, née Varley. He was educated in Rishton at Wesleyan Elementary School.

At the age of 12 he took work as weaver at a cotton mill, working half-time the first year before becoming a full-timer. In 1912 he was elected president of the Rishton district of the Amalgamated Weavers' Association.

Tomlinson married the cotton weaver Ethel Pursell on 4 September 1914 and together they had a daughter.

He was a conscientious objector in the First World War, working on the land for three years.

He was elected Member of Parliament for the Farnworth constituency in Lancashire at a by-election in 1938 and held the seat until his death in 1952, aged 62. He was joint Parliamentary Secretary under Ernest Bevin in the Ministry of Labour and National Service from February 1941 to May 1945 in Winston Churchill's wartime Coalition Government. In Clement Attlee's post-war Labour government he was Minister of Works, August 1945 – February 1947, and Minister of Education, February 1947 – October 1951, following the death of Ellen Wilkinson.

In 1944 Tomlinson was a British delegate at the International Labour Conference held at Philadelphia in the United States.

A biography of Tomlinson written by Fred Blackburn, a fellow Labour politician and Member of Parliament for Stalybridge and Hyde, was published by Heinemann in 1954. The biography, which features a foreword by Clement Attlee, is largely based on talks Blackburn had with Tomlinson before his death.

The George Tomlinson School, which opened in Kearsley the year following his death, was named in his memory. The school converted to academy status in 2010 and was renamed Kearsley Academy.

Parliament of the United Kingdom
Preceded by Guy Rowson	Member of Parliament for Farnworth; 1938–1952	Succeeded by Ernest Thornton
Political offices
Preceded by Duncan Sandys	Minister of Works; 1945–1947	Succeeded by Charles Key
Preceded by Ellen Wilkinson	Minister of Education; 1947–1951	Succeeded by Florence Horsbrugh
