= Farnworth (constituency) =

Parliamentary constituency in the United Kingdom, 1918–1983

- Former county constituency for the House of Commons
- County: Lancashire (until 1974); Greater Manchester (from 1974)

1918–1983
- Seats: one
- Created from: Ince, Leigh, Radcliffe-cum-Farnworth and Westhoughton
- Replaced by: Worsley, Bolton South East and Eccles

Farnworth was a county constituency in Lancashire which returned one Member of Parliament (MP) to the House of Commons of the Parliament of the United Kingdom from 1918 until it was abolished for the 1983 general election.

== Boundaries ==
Farnworth in Lancashire, boundaries used 1974–1983

From 1885 to 1918 the Farnworth area had been included in the Radcliffe-cum-Farnworth constituency.

The Farnworth constituency included Farnworth, Moses Gate, Kearsley, Stoneclough, Little Lever, Little Hulton, Walkden, and Roe Green.

The constituency disappeared in the 1983 redistribution; Farnworth itself and the surrounding wards within the Metropolitan Borough of Bolton were placed in the new Bolton South East constituency (1983-2024), while Walkden, Worsley and surroundings in the City of Salford became part of the new Worsley (1983–2010), later Worsley and Eccles South constituency up to 2024.

As of the 2024 General Election, both the towns of Farnworth and Walkden and their environs, are now once again in the same constituency, now known as Bolton South and Walkden, while Worsley itself remains part of a modified Worsley and Eccles constituency.

== Members of Parliament ==
Election	Member	Party
1918	Edward Bagley	Conservative
1922	Thomas Greenall	Labour
1929	Guy Rowson	Labour
1931	James Stones	Conservative
1935	Guy Rowson	Labour
1938 by-election	George Tomlinson	Labour
1952 by-election	Ernest Thornton	Labour
1970	John Roper	Labour Co-operative
1981	John Roper	SDP
1983	constituency abolished	

== Election results ==
=== Elections in the 1910s ===
General election 1918: Farnworth
Party	Candidate	Votes	%	±%
Unionist	Edward Bagley	10,237	42.9	
Labour	Thomas Greenall	9,740	40.8	
Liberal	Thomas Flitcroft	3,893	16.3	
Majority		497	2.1	
Turnout		23,870	69.9	
Registered electors		34,132		
Unionist win (new seat)				

=== Elections in the 1920s ===
General election 1922: Farnworth
Party	Candidate	Votes	%	±%
Labour	Thomas Greenall	13,391	45.6	+4.8
Unionist	Edward Bagley	10,037	34.8	−9.1
Liberal	Edward Rudd	5,927	20.2	+3.9
Majority		3,354	10.8	N/A
Turnout		29,355	84.8	+14.9
Registered electors		34,606		
Labour gain from Unionist		Swing	+6.8	

General election 1923: Farnworth
Party	Candidate	Votes	%	±%
Labour	Thomas Greenall	14,858	57.2	+11.6
Unionist	Alexander Worsthorne	11,134	42.8	+8.0
Majority		3,724	14.4	+3.6
Turnout		25,992	73.5	−11.3
Registered electors		35,351		
Labour hold		Swing	+1.5	

General election 1924: Farnworth
Party	Candidate	Votes	%	±%
Labour	Thomas Greenall	15,327	47.5	−9.7
Unionist	Alexander Worsthorne	12,521	38.7	−4.1
Liberal	J Charles Martin	4,467	13.8	N/A
Majority		2,806	8.8	−5.6
Turnout		32,315	89.6	+16.1
Registered electors		36,058		
Labour hold		Swing	−2.8	

General election 1929: Farnworth
Party	Candidate	Votes	%	±%
Labour	Guy Rowson	21,857	52.2	+4.7
Unionist	Mary Pickford	10,643	25.4	−13.3
Liberal	Ernest Frederick Dyer	9,381	22.4	+8.6
Majority		11,214	26.8	+18.0
Turnout		41,881	87.5	−2.1
Registered electors		47,841		
Labour hold		Swing	+9.0	

=== Elections in the 1930s ===
General election 1931: Farnworth
Party	Candidate	Votes	%	±%
Conservative	James Stones	22,460	53.5	+28.1
Labour	Guy Rowson	19,553	46.5	−5.7
Majority		2,907	7.0	N/A
Turnout		42,013	84.8	−2.7
Registered electors		49,550		
Conservative gain from Labour		Swing	+16.9	

General election 1935: Farnworth
Party	Candidate	Votes	%	±%
Labour	Guy Rowson	22,040	51.7	+5.2
Conservative	Edgar Godfrey Unsworth	16,839	39.5	−14.0
People's Peace	James Monteith Erskine	3,763	8.8	N/A
Majority		5,201	12.2	N/A
Turnout		42,642	82.4	−2.4
Registered electors		51,739		
Labour gain from Conservative		Swing	+9.6	

1938 Farnworth by-election
Party	Candidate	Votes	%	±%
Labour	George Tomlinson	24,298	59.1	+7.4
Conservative	Herbert F. Ryan	16,835	40.9	+1.4
Majority		7,463	18.2	+6.0
Turnout		41,133	77.9	−4.5
Registered electors		52,784		
Labour hold		Swing	+3.0	

=== Elections in the 1940s ===
General election 1945: Farnworth
Party	Candidate	Votes	%	±%
Labour	George Tomlinson	28,462	66.1	+14.4
Conservative	Fred Howard	14,570	33.9	−5.6
Majority		13,892	32.2	+20.0
Turnout		43,032	77.5	−4.9
Registered electors		55,549		
Labour hold		Swing	+10.0	

=== Elections in the 1950s ===
General election 1950: Farnworth
Party	Candidate	Votes	%	±%
Labour	George Tomlinson	25,375	56.60	
Conservative	F. Kay	14,266	31.82	
Liberal	Abraham Lomax	5,189	11.57	N/A
Majority		11,109	24.78	
Turnout		44,830	88.14	
Labour hold		Swing		

General election 1951: Farnworth
Party	Candidate	Votes	%	±%
Labour	George Tomlinson	26,297	59.22	
Conservative	Jesse Seddon	18,112	40.78	
Majority		8,185	18.44	
Turnout		44,409	86.75	
Labour hold		Swing		

1952 Farnworth by-election
Party	Candidate	Votes	%	±%
Labour	Ernest Thornton	21,834	59.90	+0.68
Conservative	Donald Henry Moore	14,615	40.10	−0.68
Majority		7,219	19.80	+1.36
Turnout		36,449		
Labour hold		Swing		

General election 1955: Farnworth
Party	Candidate	Votes	%	±%
Labour	Ernest Thornton	24,829	57.66	
Conservative	David Waddington	18,231	42.34	
Majority		6,598	15.32	
Turnout		43,060	81.53	
Labour hold		Swing		

General election 1959: Farnworth
Party	Candidate	Votes	%	±%
Labour	Ernest Thornton	27,393	58.60	
Conservative	Albert Samuel Royse	19,356	41.40	
Majority		8,037	17.20	
Turnout		46,749	83.34	
Labour hold		Swing		

=== Elections in the 1960s ===
General election 1964: Farnworth
Party	Candidate	Votes	%	±%
Labour	Ernest Thornton	28,492	62.06	
Conservative	Albert Samuel Royse	17,421	37.94	
Majority		11,071	24.12	
Turnout		45,913	78.79	
Labour hold		Swing		

General election 1966: Farnworth
Party	Candidate	Votes	%	±%
Labour	Ernest Thornton	30,015	66.19	
Conservative	Mark Andrew	15,329	33.81	
Majority		14,686	32.38	
Turnout		45,344	74.78	
Labour hold		Swing		

=== Elections in the 1970s ===
General election 1970: Farnworth
Party	Candidate	Votes	%	±%
Labour Co-op	John Roper	29,392	58.48	
Conservative	Ivan A. Johnston	20,867	41.52	
Majority		8,525	16.96	
Turnout		50,259	72.26	
Labour hold		Swing		

General election February 1974: Farnworth
Party	Candidate	Votes	%	±%
Labour Co-op	John Roper	28,068	49.75	
Conservative	Albert Samuel Royse	15,431	27.35	
Liberal	Margaret Patricia Rothwell	12,918	22.90	N/A
Majority		12,637	22.40	
Turnout		56,417	80.73	
Labour hold		Swing		

General election October 1974: Farnworth
Party	Candidate	Votes	%	±%
Labour Co-op	John Roper	28,184	53.5	
Conservative	R. H. Shepherd	13,489	25.6	
Liberal	Margaret Patricia Rothwell	11,059	21.0	
Majority		14,695	27.9	
Turnout		52,732	74.73	
Labour hold		Swing		

General election 1979: Farnworth
Party	Candidate	Votes	%	±%
Labour Co-op	John Roper	27,965	50.1	−3.4
Conservative	Stanley Windle	19,858	35.6	+10.0
Liberal	Margaret Patricia Rothwell	8,043	14.4	−6.6
Majority		8,107	14.5	−13.3
Turnout		55,866	77.8	+3.1
Labour hold		Swing	−6.7	
