= Rochdale and District Weavers', Reelers', Beamers' and Doublers' Association =

Former trade union of the United Kingdom

Rochdale Weavers' Association
- Rochdale and District Weavers', Reelers', Beamers' and Doublers' Association
- Merged into: Rochdale and Todmorden District of the Amalgamated Textile Workers' Union
- Founded: 1878
- Dissolved: 1970
- Headquarters: Cloth Hall, College Street, Rochdale
- Location: England
- Members: 5,000 (1920s)
- Affiliations: Amalgamated Weavers' Association (1892–1896, 1906–1970)

The Rochdale and District Weavers', Reelers', Beamers' and Doublers' Association was a trade union representing cotton industry workers in Rochdale and surrounding areas of Lancashire in England.

A union of weavers, working both in cotton and in wool, existed in Rochdale in 1860, but disappeared and was refounded in 1878, representing only those working in cotton. It was initially known as the Rochdale and District Weavers', Winders', Reelers', Beamers' and Hosiery Workers' Association. In 1884, the Whitworth Vale Weavers' Association broke away, following a dispute about finances.

In the 1890s, the Rochdale association was one of the largest weavers' unions, with more than 2,500 members. It joined the Amalgamated Weavers' Association in 1892, but left four years later following a dispute. Its membership initially continued to grow, reaching 4,000 in the early 1900s, but fell back to 3,300 in 1906, two-thirds of whom were women. It rejoined the AWA in 1906, and membership reached a peak of more than 5,000 in the 1920s.

In 1931, the union adopted it final name, and in 1934, the Whitworth Vale Weavers' Association rejoined. Partly as a result of this, it retained its membership better than most other local cotton unions, as employment in the industry fell, and in 1970 it still had more than 2,000 members. That year, it merged with the Todmorden, Bacup and District Weavers' and Winders' Association, becoming the Rochdale and Todmorden District of the Amalgamated Textile Workers' Union.

== General Secretaries ==
1890s: James H. Holden
1929: Ernest Thornton
1964: R. W. Hill?
