= Sir Joseph Renals, 1st Baronet =

British politician (1843–1908)

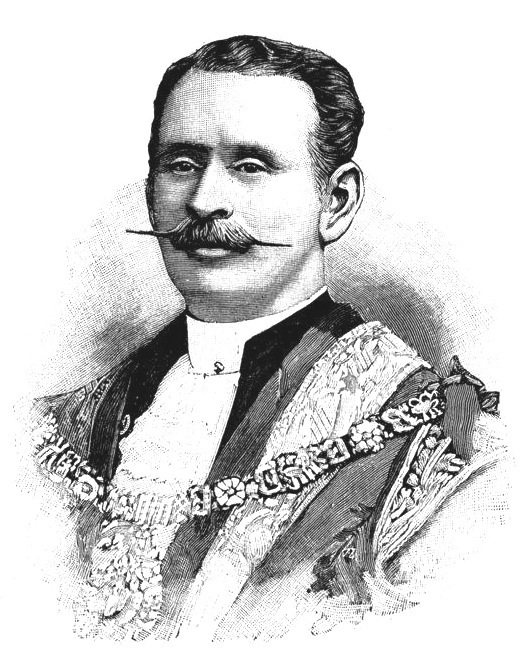
- Born: 21 February 1843; Nottingham, England
- Died: 1 November 1908 (aged 65)
- Known for: Lord Mayor of London
- Spouse: Mary Wilson (m. 1870)
- Children: 3
- Father: William Renals

Sir Joseph Renals, 1st Baronet (21 February 1843 – 1 November 1908) was Lord Mayor of London for 1894–95.

== Career ==
The son of William Renals, of The Park, Nottingham, Renals was born in Nottingham and was privately educated there. He was a partner in the firm of Renals & Co, merchants.

He married Mary Wilson in 1870, and they had three children.

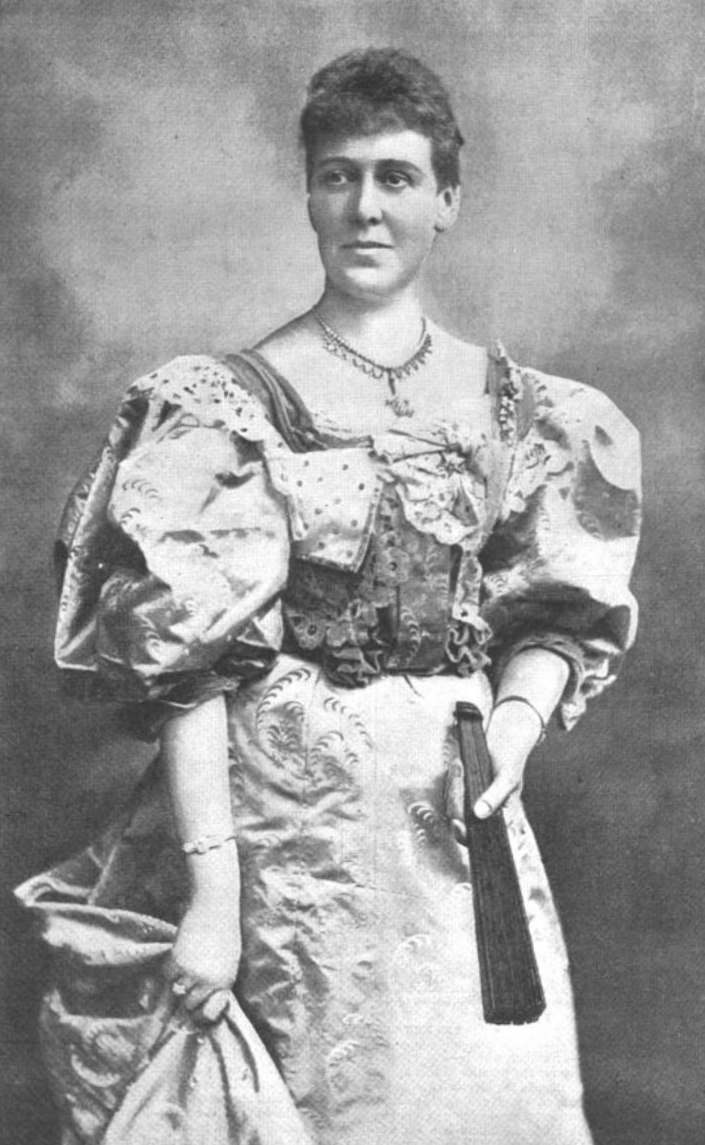
Lady Renals

He was Common Councillor for Aldersgate Ward between 1885 and 1888, and an Alderman from 1888 to 1907. He was Sheriff of the City of London for 1892–93 and Lord Mayor of London for 1894–95. His tenure as Lord Mayor was controversial, and the City of London Corporation refused to pass the customary vote of thanks on his relinquishing the office.

He was created a Baronet, of the City of London, on 4 September 1895.

== See also ==
- Renals baronets
