= Algernon Egerton =

British politician

Algernon Fulke Egerton (31 December 1825 – 14 July 1891), known as Algernon Leveson-Gower until 1833, was a British Conservative politician from the Egerton family.

== Background ==
Egerton was the third son of Francis Egerton, 1st Earl of Ellesmere, younger son of George Leveson-Gower, 1st Duke of Sutherland. His mother was Harriet Catherine, daughter of Charles Greville, while George Egerton, 2nd Earl of Ellesmere, and the Honourable Francis Egerton were his elder brothers.

== Political career ==
Egerton entered the House of Commons for Lancashire South in 1859, a seat he held until 1868, and then represented Lancashire South-East from 1868 to 1880 and Wigan from 1882 to 1885. He held office under Benjamin Disraeli as Parliamentary Secretary to the Admiralty from 1874 to 1880.

== Volunteer and Yeomanry career ==
On 16 May 1860 he was commissioned as Lieutenant-Colonel Commandant of the 3rd Manchester Rifles, a Rifle Volunteer unit recently raised by his political colleague John Snowdon Henry. He later became its Honorary Colonel, and in 1875 his nephew, Francis Egerton, 3rd Earl of Ellesmere became lieutenant-colonel commandant.

He was also commissioned as lieutenant-colonel commandant of the Duke of Lancaster's Own Yeomanry on 15 December 1862 and remained in command until 1882.

== Family ==
Egerton married Alice Louisa, daughter of Lord George Cavendish, in 1863. They had two sons and seven daughters:

- Margaret Louisa Egerton (d. October 1950), married 10 October 1901 George Chichester May (d. 3 November 1924), son of George Augustus Chichester May, Lord Chief Justice of Ireland.
- Blanche Susan Egerton (d. 1 November 1940).
- Katherine Alice Egerton (1867 - 13 December 1962).
- Sybil Mary Egerton (d. 27 August 1873).
- Violet Ellinor Egerton (1873 - 6 March 1968) married Frederick Walter Stephenson (d. 19 May 1944) on 27 January 1914.
- Mary Florence Egerton.
- Evelyn Harriet Egerton (d. 3 November 1964).
- George Algernon Egerton (b. 1 December 1870; died of wounds received in action, 13 May 1915).
- Ralph Greville Egerton (27 November 1876 – 9 January 1877).

Egerton died in July 1891, aged 65. His wife survived him by fourteen years and died in March 1905.

== Notes ==
Parliament of the United Kingdom
Preceded by William Brown; John Cheetham	Member of Parliament for Lancashire South; 1859 – 1868; With: William Legh 1859–1868; Charles Turner 1861–1868 (representation increased to three members 1861)	Constituency abolished
New constituency	Member of Parliament for Lancashire South-East; 1868 – 1880; With: John Snowdon Henry 1868–1874; Edward Hardcastle 1874–1880	Succeeded by Robert Leake; William Agnew
Preceded by Thomas Knowles; Francis Powell	Member of Parliament for Wigan; 1882 – 1885; With: Thomas Knowles 1882–1883; Nathaniel Eckersley 1883–1885	Succeeded by Francis Powell (representation reduced to one member 1885)
Political offices
Preceded by George Shaw-Lefevre	Parliamentary Secretary to the Admiralty; 1874–1880	Succeeded by George Shaw-Lefevre
