= Sir John Agnew, 6th Baronet =

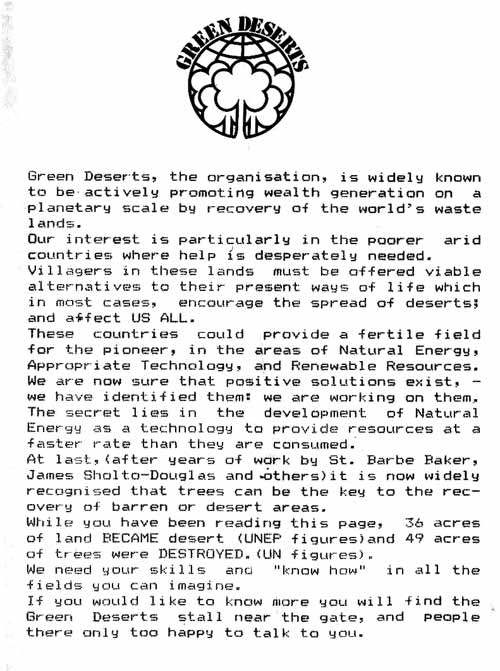
Green Deserts was started, and supported, by John Agnew from c1975 to at least 1982

Sir John Keith Agnew, 6th Baronet (19 December 1950 – 22 June 2011) was the owner of the Rougham estates in Suffolk, England.

He was the son of Sir George Keith Agnew, fifth Baronet (1918–1994), and his Danish-born wife Baroness Anne Merete Louise Schaffalitzky de Muckadell (Roskilde 1924 – 31 March 2005).

Agnew was educated at Gresham's School, Holt, from 1964 to 1969 and then at the Royal Agricultural College, Cirencester. He succeeded to the UK baronetcy (Agnew, of The Planche, Suffolk, created 1895) in 1994.

The Rougham estates include Rougham Airfield, where Agnew organized a wide variety of annual fairs, rallies and events, including the Wings, Wheels & Steam Country Fair, the annual Rougham Air Display & Harvest Fair, and the East Anglian Medieval Battle & Fair. A Rougham Music Festival, of which Agnew's brother and heir George Agnew was the Arts Director, was also held on the estate. Agnew started Green Deserts which planned to help stop desertification in the Sudan and elsewhere.

Sir John Agnew of Rougham should not be confused with his cousin John Stuart Agnew of Rougham, farmer, a parliamentary candidate of the UK Independence Party. The title was created for their ancestor Sir William Agnew (1825–1910), a member of parliament and international art dealer, who bought the Rougham estates in 1904.

Agnew's brother George Anthony Agnew (born 18 August 1953) succeeded him as 7th baronet.

Baronetage of the United Kingdom
Preceded by George Keith Agnew	Agnew baronets (of Great Stanhope Street); 1994–2011	Succeeded by George Agnew
