= James Stones =

British Member of Parliament

James Stones (6 April 1868 – 17 September 1935) was a British Member of Parliament.

Born in Farnworth, Stones was educated at St James' School in the town. He became a railway clerk in 1882, working until he was promoted to cashier and paymaster in 1920, and then retiring in 1928.

Stones was a member of the Conservative Party, for which he served on Farnworth Urban District Council, including a period as chairman of the council from 1915 to 1919.

At the 1931 United Kingdom general election, Stones stood in Farnworth and was elected. He served until his death, late in 1935.

Parliament of the United Kingdom
Preceded by Guy Rowson	Member of Parliament for Farnworth; 1931 – 1935	Succeeded by Guy Rowson
