= South Lancashire (constituency) =

Parliamentary constituency in the United Kingdom, 1861–1868

- Former county constituency for the House of Commons
- Context: 1832-1868. Extract from 1837 result: the southern 'doubly' blue area for this election.
- County: Lancashire

1832–1868
- Seats: Two until 1861, then three
- Created from: Lancashire
- Replaced by: South East Lancashire; South West Lancashire; Stalybridge

South Lancashire, formally called the Southern Division of Lancashire or Lancashire Southern, is a former county constituency of the South Lancashire area in England. It returned two Members of Parliament (MPs) to the British House of Commons from 1832 to 1861, and then from a very narrow reform of that year, three until it was further split in 1868.

The constituency was created by the Great Reform Act 1832 by the splitting of Lancashire constituency into Northern and Southern divisions. It was abolished by the Reform Act 1867.

== Boundaries ==
1832–1868: The Hundreds of Salford, and West Derby.

Salford went to form the new South East Lancashire constituency, and West Derby the new South West Lancashire constituency.

== Members of Parliament ==
=== MPs 1832–1861 ===
- Constituency created (1832)

Election	First member	First party	Second member	Second party
1832	George William Wood	Whig	Viscount Molyneux	Whig
1835	Lord Francis Egerton	Conservative	Richard Bootle Wilbraham	Conservative
1837	Lord Francis Egerton	Conservative	Richard Bootle Wilbraham	Conservative
1841	Lord Francis Egerton	Conservative	Richard Bootle Wilbraham	Conservative
1844 by-election	Lord Francis Egerton	Conservative	William Entwisle	Conservative
1846 by-election	William Brown	Radical	William Entwisle	Conservative
1847	William Brown	Radical	Hon. Charles Pelham Villiers	Radical
1847 by-election	William Brown	Radical	Alexander Henry	Radical
1852	William Brown	Radical	John Cheetham	Radical
1859	Hon. Algernon Egerton	Conservative	William Legh	Conservative
1861 by-election	representation increased to three members			

=== MPs 1861–1868 ===
Election	First member	First party	Second member	Second party	Third member	Third party
1861 by-election	Hon. Algernon Egerton	Conservative	William Legh	Conservative	Charles Turner	Conservative
1865	Hon. Algernon Egerton	Conservative	William Ewart Gladstone	Liberal	Charles Turner	Conservative
1868	Reform Act 1867: constituency abolished					

== Elections ==
General election 1832: South Lancashire (2 seats)
Party	Candidate	Votes	%
Whig	George Wood	5,694	39.7
Whig	Charles Molyneux	5,575	38.8
Tory	Sir Thomas Dalrymple Hesketh, 3rd Baronet	3,082	21.5
Majority		2,493	17.3
Turnout		8,453	84.2
Registered electors		10,039	
Whig win (new seat)			
Whig win (new seat)			

General election 1835: South Lancashire (2 seats)
Party	Candidate	Votes	%	±%
Conservative	Francis Egerton	5,620	29.0	+18.3
Conservative	Richard Bootle-Wilbraham	4,729	24.4	+13.7
Whig	Charles Molyneux	4,629	23.9	−14.9
Whig	George Wood	4,394	22.7	−17.0
Majority		5,226	6.3	N/A
Majority		100	0.5	N/A
Turnout		9,850	85.5	+1.3
Registered electors		11,519		
Conservative gain from Whig		Swing	+17.1	
Conservative gain from Whig		Swing	+14.8	

General election 1837: South Lancashire (2 seats)
Party	Candidate	Votes	%	±%
Conservative	Francis Egerton	7,822	27.8	−1.2
Conservative	Richard Bootle-Wilbraham	7,645	27.2	+2.8
Whig	Edward Stanley	6,576	23.4	−0.5
Whig	Charles Towneley	6,047	21.5	−1.2
Majority		1,069	3.8	+3.3
Turnout		13,967	78.7	−6.8
Registered electors		17,754		
Conservative hold		Swing	−0.2	
Conservative hold		Swing	+1.8	

General election 1841: South Lancashire (2 seats)
Party	Candidate	Votes	%	±%
Conservative	Francis Egerton	Unopposed		
Conservative	Richard Bootle-Wilbraham	Unopposed		
Registered electors		18,178		
Conservative hold				
Conservative hold				

Wilbraham's death caused a by-election.

By-election, 24 May 1844: South Lancashire
Party	Candidate	Votes	%	±%
Conservative	William Entwisle	7,571	52.1	N/A
Radical	William Brown	6,973	47.9	New
Majority		598	4.2	N/A
Majority		14,544	78.5	N/A
Registered electors		18,521		
Conservative hold		Swing	N/A	

Egerton was elevated to the peerage, becoming 1st Earl of Ellesmere and causing a by-election.

By-election, 21 July 1846: South Lancashire
Party	Candidate	Votes	%	±%
Radical	William Brown	Unopposed		
Radical gain from Conservative				

General election 1847: South Lancashire (2 seats)
Party	Candidate	Votes	%	±%
Radical	William Brown	Unopposed		
Radical	Charles Pelham Villiers	Unopposed		
Registered electors		23,630		
Radical gain from Conservative				
Radical gain from Conservative				

Pelham-Villiers was also elected MP for Wolverhampton and opted to sit there, causing a by-election.

By-election, 20 December 1847: South Lancashire
Party	Candidate	Votes	%	±%
Radical	Alexander Henry	Unopposed		
Radical hold				

General election 1852: South Lancashire (2 seats)
Party	Candidate	Votes	%	±%
Radical	William Brown	Unopposed		
Radical	John Cheetham	Unopposed		
Registered electors		21,196		
Radical hold				
Radical hold				

General election 1857: South Lancashire (2 seats)
Party	Candidate	Votes	%	±%
Radical	William Brown	Unopposed		
Radical	John Cheetham	Unopposed		
Registered electors		20,460		
Radical hold				
Radical hold				

General election 1859: South Lancashire (2 seats)
Party	Candidate	Votes	%	±%
Conservative	Algernon Egerton	7,470	26.6	New
Conservative	William Legh	6,983	24.9	New
Liberal	John Cheetham	6,835	24.4	N/A
Liberal	John Pemberton Heywood	6,763	24.1	N/A
Majority		707	2.5	N/A
Majority		148	0.5	N/A
Turnout		14,026 (est)	72.2 (est)	N/A
Registered electors		19,433		
Conservative gain from Liberal		Swing	N/A	
Conservative gain from Liberal		Swing	N/A	

- Third seat created.

By-election, 19 August 1861: South Lancashire
Party	Candidate	Votes	%	±%
Conservative	Charles Turner	9,714	52.2	
Liberal	John Cheetham	8,898	47.8	
Majority		816	4.4	
Turnout		18,612	95.8	
Registered electors		19,433		
Conservative win (new seat)				

General election 1865: South Lancashire (3 seats)
Party	Candidate	Votes	%	±%
Conservative	Algernon Egerton	9,171	18.1	−8.5
Conservative	Charles Turner	8,806	17.4	N/A
Liberal	William Ewart Gladstone	8,786	17.4	−7.0
Conservative	William Legh	8,476	16.8	−8.1
Liberal	Henry Yates Thompson	7,703	15.2	N/A
Liberal	John Pemberton Heywood	7,653	15.1	−9.0
Turnout		16,865 (est)	78.2 (est)	+6.0
Registered electors		21,555		
Majority		20	0.0	−0.5
Conservative hold		Swing	−0.3	
Conservative hold		Swing	N/A	
Majority		310	0.6	
Liberal win (new seat)				

- Third seat treated as new for 1865 election.

== Sources ==
- Leigh Rayment's Historical List of MPs – Constituencies beginning with "L" (part 1)
