= Alexander Henry (MP) =

British Radical politician (1783–1862)

Member of Parliament for South Lancashire
- In office 20 December 1847 – 14 July 1852 Serving with William Brown
- Preceded by: William Brown; Charles Pelham Villiers
- Succeeded by: William Brown; John Cheetham

Personal details
- Born: 1783
- Died: 4 October 1862 (aged 78–79)
- Party: Radical

Alexander Henry (1783 – 4 October 1862) was a British Radical politician.

== Life ==
Alexander Henry of Woodlands, near Manchester, England, was born in County Down. He moved to England in 1804, and with his brother Samuel, established A & S Henry & Co Ltd, a dealer in cotton. The firm was very successful, having branches in Huddersfield and elsewhere and they became very wealthy. Samuel Henry used to travel to Alabama to buy cotton. He died in 1840 when the steamship Lexington caught fire and sank in Long Island Sound.

Alexander was a member of the Cross Street congregation, a Unitarian chapel. He married Elizabeth, daughter of George Brush of Willowbrook, Killinchy, County Down. Henry was active in the postal reform movement and a supporter of the Anti-Corn Law League.

Henry was elected Radical Member of Parliament for South Lancashire at a [by-election in 1847 —caused by Charles Pelham Villiers' decision to sit for another seat—and held the seat until 1852 when he did not seek re-election.

== See also ==
- Mitchell Henry

Parliament of the United Kingdom
Preceded by William Brown; Charles Pelham Villiers	Member of Parliament for South Lancashire; 1847–1852; With: William Brown	Succeeded by William Brown; John Cheetham
