= Guy Rowson =

British Labour politician (1883–1937)

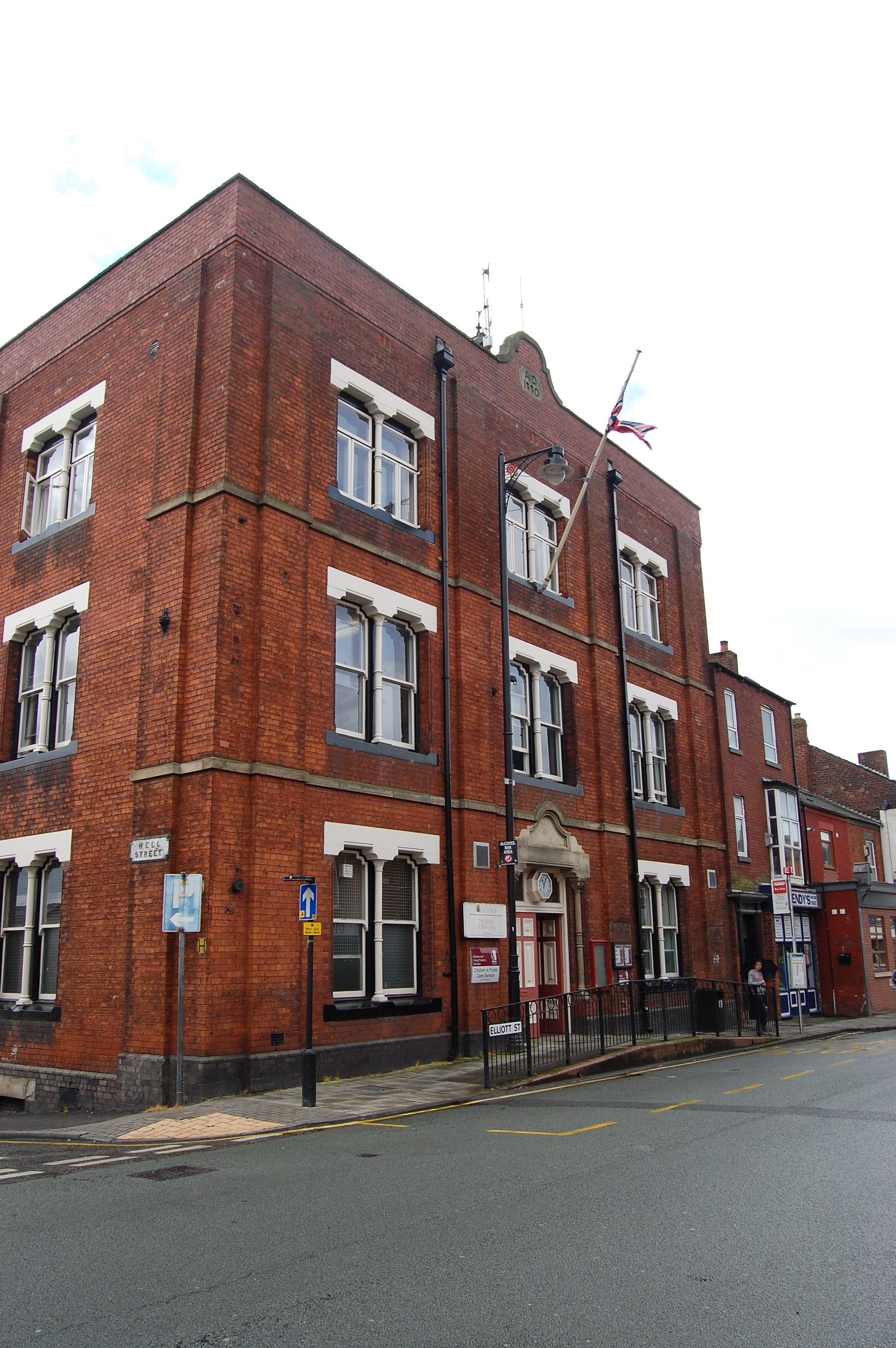
Tyldesley Town Hall at which Rowson served 1919-1925

Guy Rowson (1883 - 16 November 1937) was a British Labour Party politician who served as the Member of Parliament (MP) for Farnworth in Lancashire. He was elected in 1929, defeated in 1931, and re-elected in 1935, until his death in 1937. He was Parliamentary Private Secretary to the then Labour leader of the opposition, Clement Attlee. In 1936, he was responsible for the introduction of the Annual Holiday Bill, which regulated holiday pay for workers.

== Mining ==
Rowson became a coal miner at age 12. In 1923, he became a Miners' Agent in the Lancashire and Cheshire Miners' Federation.

== Other activities ==
In 1907 he joined the Social Democratic Federation, and in 1910 he stood as a Socialist for the Tyldesley Urban District Council. where he was defeated, but elected in 1919, where he served until 1925.

== Quotes ==
In his memoires, British Prime Minister Clement Attlee wrote:

"I appointed a Lancashire miner, Guy Rowson, as my Parliamentary Private Secretary, but his early death cut short a promising career."

== Personal ==
Born in 1883 in Ellenbrook, near Worsley in Lancashire, he was the son of a coal miner, Joseph Rowson and his wife Mary.

Parliament of the United Kingdom
Preceded by Thomas Greenall	Member of Parliament for Farnworth; 1929 – 1931	Succeeded by James Stones
Preceded by James Stones	Member of Parliament for Farnworth; 1935 – 1937	Succeeded by George Tomlinson
