= Edward Hardcastle =

British businessman and Conservative politician

Edward Hardcastle (1826 – 1 November 1905) was a British businessman and Conservative politician who sat in the House of Commons between 1874 and 1892.

Hardcastle was the second son of Alfred Hardcastle of Hatcham House, Surrey, and his wife Eliza Smith of Manchester. His uncle J A Hardcastle was Member of Parliament for Bury St Edmunds. He was educated at Trinity College, Cambridge, and Downing College, Cambridge before going into trade as a merchant, making his home at Prestwich, Lancashire. In 1863 he helped form the Manchester Southern Independence Association to provide support to the Confederate States of America. He was also a J.P. and Deputy Lieutenant for Lancashire, a governor of Owen's College, and of Cheetham Hospital, and a trustee of Manchester Grammar School.

Hardcastle was elected as one of two Conservative MPs for South East Lancashire at the 1874 general election. At the next election in 1880 both Hardcastle and his colleague Algernon Egerton lost to Liberal Party candidates.

Hardcastle returned to Commons at the 1885 general election, when he became the first MP for the newly created constituency of Salford North. He held the seat until 1892, when he stood down, and was replaced as MP by William Holland of the Liberals.

Hardcastle married Priscilla Buxton Hoare, daughter of Samuel Hoare, Junior, banker of Lombard Street, in 1851. Among their sons was Edward Hardcastle, Archdeacon of Canterbury.

Parliament of the United Kingdom
Preceded by John Snowdon Henry and Algernon Egerton	Member of Parliament for Lancashire South-East; 1874–1880; With: Algernon Egerton	Succeeded by Robert Leake and William Agnew
New constituency	Member of Parliament for Salford North; 1885–1892	Succeeded by William Holland
