= Francis Egerton, 1st Earl of Ellesmere =

British politician, writer, and traveller (1800–1857)

The Right Honourable The Earl of Ellesmere KG PC PC (Ire)
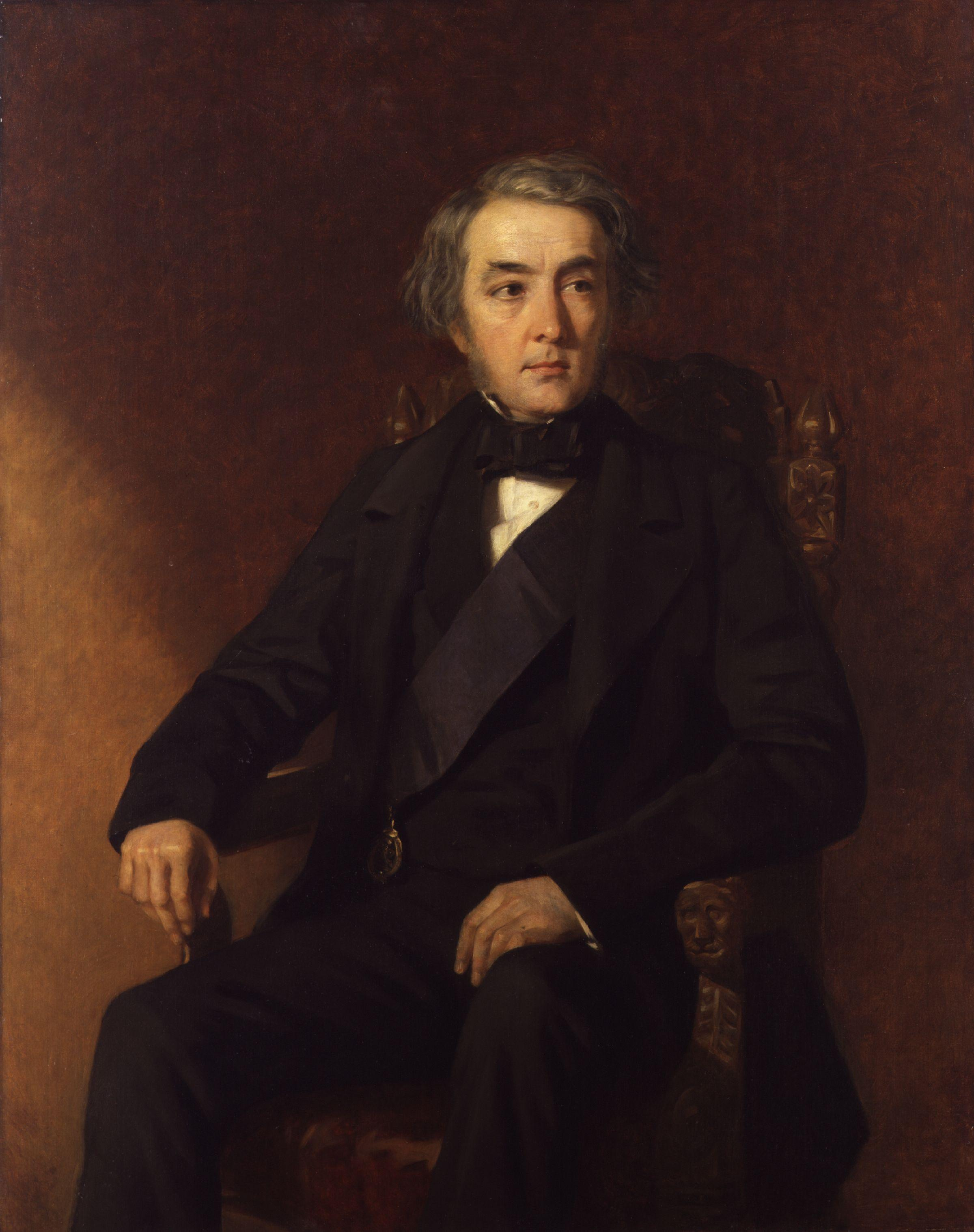
- Portrait of the Earl of Ellesmere by Edwin Longsden Long

Chief Secretary for Ireland
- In office 21 June 1828 – 30 July 1830
- Monarchs: George IV; William IV
- Prime Minister: The Duke of Wellington
- Preceded by: Hon. William Lamb
- Succeeded by: Sir Henry Hardinge

Secretary at War
- In office 30 July 1830 – 15 November 1830
- Monarch: William IV
- Prime Minister: The Duke of Wellington
- Preceded by: Sir Henry Hardinge
- Succeeded by: Charles Williams-Wynn

Personal details
- Born: Francis Egerton; 1 January 1800 Piccadilly, London
- Died: 18 February 1857 (aged 57) Westminster, London
- Party: Tory
- Spouse: Harriet Greville (m. 1822)
- Children: 11, including: George Egerton, 2nd Earl of Ellesmere; Hon. Francis Egerton; Hon. Algernon Egerton
- Parent(s): George Leveson-Gower, 1st Duke of Sutherland; Elizabeth Gordon, 19th Countess of Sutherland
- Education: Eton College
- Alma mater: Christ Church, Oxford

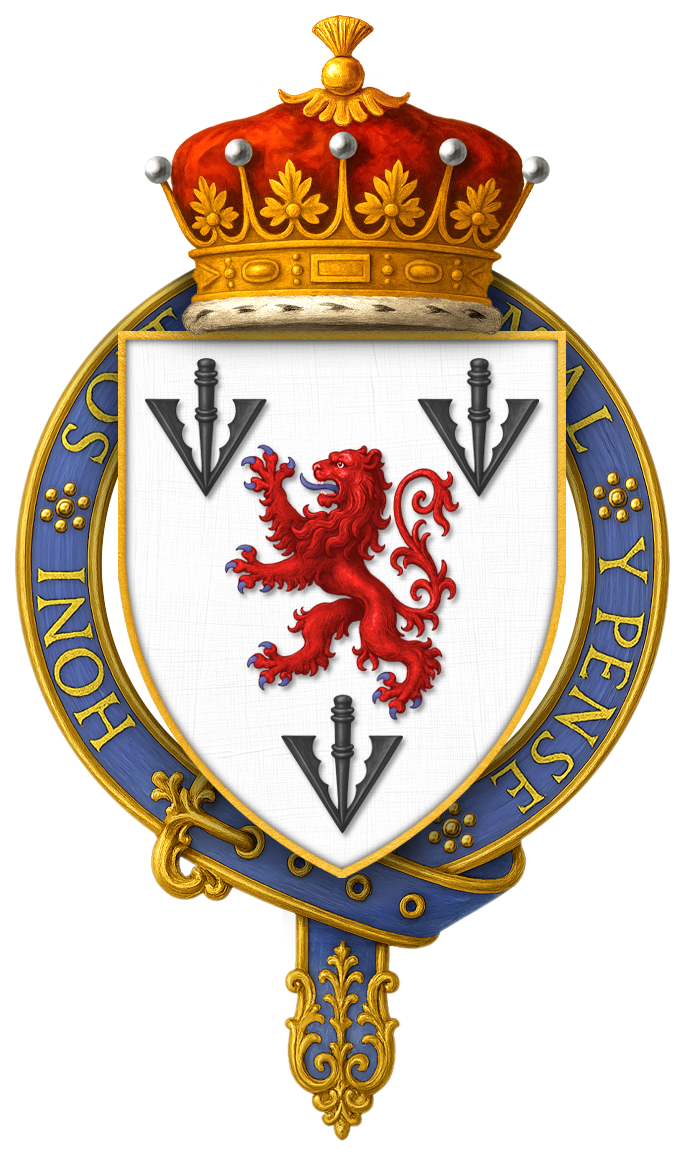
Garter-encircled arms of Francis Egerton, 1st Earl of Ellesmere, KG, PC

Francis Egerton, 1st Earl of Ellesmere (1 January 1800 – 18 February 1857), known as Lord Francis Leveson-Gower until 1833, was a British politician, writer, traveller and patron of the arts. Ellesmere Island, a major island (10th in size among global islands) in Nunavut, the Canadian Arctic, was named after him.

== Background and education ==
Ellesmere was born at 21 Arlington Street, Piccadilly, London, on 1 January 1800, the third son of George Leveson-Gower (then known as Lord Gower) and his wife, Elizabeth Gordon who was 19th Countess of Sutherland in her own right. (Note: The second son (William) had died in infancy (born June 1792, died September 1793) before Francis was born.) He was educated at Eton and Christ Church, Oxford, and then held a commission in the Life Guards, which he resigned on his marriage. (Note: He became (by purchase) a cornet in the 10th Light Dragoons in November 1821 then (again by purchase) a cornet in the Life Guards in February 1822. In later years it was suggested from time to time that Egerton - although a very rich man - was still drawing the half-pay he was entitled to as a retired officer) In October 1803 his father became Marquess of Stafford, having shortly before inherited the considerable wealth (but not the titles) of Francis Egerton, 3rd Duke of Bridgewater, whose will provided that the Bridgewater estates should next pass to Francis, rather than his elder brother George.

== Political career ==
=== Lord Francis Leveson Gower, MP ===
Egerton entered Parliament in 1822 as member for the pocket borough of Bletchingley in Surrey, a seat he held until 1826. He afterwards sat for Sutherland between 1826 and 1831, and for South Lancashire between 1835 and 1846. In 1835, a parliamentary sketch-writer said of his performance in the Commons: "He hardly ever speaks, and then but very indifferently… His voice is harsh and husky and not very strong. There is no variety either in it or in his gesture. Both are monotonous in a high degree... He is much respected by his own party, both for his personal worth, and for his high family connexions."

In politics he was a Conservative who – as he later said – 'worshipped' Wellington; on specific policies his views usually led him to support Sir Robert Peel; the most obvious exception being his support of the Ten-Hour movement. In 1823, he was a junior member of the mission of FitzRoy Somerset sent by Wellington to Madrid. On the religious issues of the day, he held that the state and its institutions should remain Anglican, but that – provided that was done – other sects should be conciliated as far as was then possible. He opposed opening the ancient universities to Dissenters, arguing that they could get equally good education elsewhere; e.g. at London University, whose formation he had supported. In 1825 he was chosen to move the Loyal Address; (Note: In doing so, he said "Our commerce is now happily in the progress of being freed from many restrictions, which, bottomed upon false principles, impeded its free course. Those absurd enactments are now expunged from the text-book of the political economist." Egerton's obituary in the Times says "twenty years before Sir Robert Peel adopted the policy of free trade, that measure had been strenuously advocated by Lord Francis Egerton in his place in parliament". The Loyal Address endorses government policy, and the rest of the debate gives the contemporary context (abolition of import duties on silk and cotton, repeal of the Navigation Acts), with even Brougham advocating no more than a reduction and equalisation of the import duties on wine. If Egerton did go beyond his Loyal Address platitudes in the 1820s, it would appear to have gone unrecorded by Hansard and contemporary newspapers; nor does he ever seem to have been twitted on it by his opponents (who did point out his past speeches and votes on Catholic relief) during his subsequent opposition to repeal of the Corn Laws. The Times obituary contains a number of errors, some of which seem to have found their way into the DNB article) later in the year he made and saw carried a motion for the endowment of the Roman Catholic clergy in Ireland, at a time when the government were pledged to seek the consent of the King before doing so: some suspected he did so at the behest of the government. Appointed a Lord of the Treasury in 1827, he was promoted to Under-Secretary of State for War and the Colonies in February 1828 at the request of William Huskisson, having first to overcome the opposition of his father. When Huskisson resigned in May 1828, Egerton's father insisted upon Egerton's resignation; on Egerton's subsequent account because he thought the Wellington cabinet had lost its more enlightened elements and would now take a hard line against Catholic Relief. Egerton, however, was convinced that Wellington intended some measure of relief and soon rejoined the government; (Note: Again - according to Egerton; Lord Ellenborough thought 'family ambition' the explanation) in June 1828 he was made a Privy Councillor and appointed Chief Secretary for Ireland, a post he held until July 1830, when he became Secretary at War for a short time during the last Tory ministry. Daniel O'Connell, when alleging duplicity by the subsequent Whig administration, said "I never knew a gentleman more incapable of violating his promise than Lord Francis Leveson Gower" Sutherland was a pocket county of his family and when in 1831 his father supported parliamentary reform but Francis did not, his father presented the seat to a supporter of reform: in 1833 his father was made Duke of Sutherland.

=== The Bridgewater trust ===
His father, however, died within the year, and the estates he had inherited from Francis Egerton, 3rd Duke of Bridgewater passed to Francis, who then took, by royal licence, the surname of Egerton. The Bridgewater estates were held under trust and gave an annual income reported to be £90,000, but the trust was drawn up to exclude Egerton from its day-to-day management. The principal assets were the Bridgewater Canal, and the collieries at Worsley, which also served as the headquarters of the canal.

==== Worsley ====
In a letter of 1837, Egerton spoke of the various undertakings at Worsley giving him influence over the immediate destinies of between three and four thousand people. The coal mines at Worsley were said in 1837 to employ 1,700 people. It was reported in 1842 that there had been 101 persons killed and injured in them in the previous three years One of the staff of the 1833 Factory Commission had noted that the Worsley mine "was said to be the best mine in the place" but concluded from what he saw that "the hardest labour in the worst-conducted factory is less hard, less cruel, and less demoralizing than the labour in the best of coal-mines"

One trustee lived in Worsley Old Hall and was the effective manager of the estates, but after he resisted inspection of the books by Egerton's auditor and man of business James Loch MP he was forced out and replaced by Loch. Egerton then made Worsley New Hall one of his principal residences, but soon demolished it and replaced it with a larger hall in Elizabethan style. He set about making Worsley a model estate village; within ten years a national newspaper, deploring the 'ignorance of the collier class' claimed "What may be done by a proprietor, what should be done by every proprietor, is illustrated in the case of Lord Francis Egerton and the Worsley colliers". Until Egerton had taken up residence at Worsley it had been "imperfectly provided with the means of moral and intellectual improvement for the people" but now "The population is nearly 6,000. For their use, two churches have been built, and a third is now in course of erection. Five clergymen have been provided, in addition to the one original incumbent. Seven-day schools have been established, with trained masters and mistresses, fully supplied with the best books and apparatus. A reading-room has been opened, containing the best periodicals of the day, and a considerable circulating library. The room is provided with fire and lights; is open every evening; and is much frequented by the labouring people, as an agreeable resort after their day's work. A large field, of not less than sixty acres, has been set apart as a recreation ground… Cricket, quoits, and other athletic games are encouraged; and the private band occasionally attends there on pay-days. In the centre, an ornamental building has been erected, in which the wages of all the labourers on that part of the estate are paid fortnightly. There are few public-houses and no beer-shops on the estate. The houses built for the workmen are convenient; most of them have four rooms and a pantry, back-yard and garden, at a rent of about £3 per annum, including rates" (Note: The houses were uniformly yellow-rendered with green doors according to a (largely corroborative) account of the royal visit in 1851, which also gives a detailed description of the Canal 'yard' at Worsley (and struggles to be polite about the 'Tudor-Elizabethan' architecture of the New Hall): although not commented upon in contemporary sources 'Pevsner' notes the estate houses built under Egerton to have introduced a local tradition of "Tudor-style timber-framed" housing.)

Worsley Hall served as a suitable base for royal visits to Manchester (the first occurring in 1851) and Egerton presided at the 1842 meeting of the British Association of Science in Manchester (Note: It had been intended that John Dalton should (if only nominally) be president, but he declined on grounds of ill-health and it was thought inappropriate to attempt to replace him with a lesser scientist) but Egerton had little influence in Manchester; when his name was put forward for presidency of the Manchester Athenaeum, Richard Cobden was brought forward as an alternative candidate, and duly elected. Egerton's politics (Tory and protectionist) were not those of (Reform and Free Trade) Manchester, and his association with the Bridgewater trust also told against him.

==== The Bridgewater canal ====
The canal was highly profitable, and owed much of its profitability to price-fixing agreements with its rivals; this led to resentment in both Liverpool and Manchester of its wealth and influence (and hence that of Egerton). After 1810, when they had agreed to charge identical rates, the canal and the Mersey and Irwell Navigation ('the Old Quay Company') had enjoyed a profitable duopoly of Manchester-Liverpool goods traffic (not because each had exclusive use of their waterway, but because each had a monopoly of Manchester warehouses with easy access to their waterway). The Liverpool and Manchester Railway had been promoted to allow greater volumes of traffic between the two towns, and to bring down transport costs. However, faced with strenuous opposition from Egerton's father, the railway's promoters had won him round to the extent that he had subscribed for over a fifth of the company's capital with a corresponding presence on the board. The shares had been inherited, not by Egerton, but by his brother, the 2nd Duke of Sutherland; Loch was also auditor and principal steward for the Duke, as well as personally holding shares in the railway. When the railway opened, the rates charged by two previous carriers settled down just below the maximum (ten shillings a ton) the railway was allowed to charge by its act of Parliament. (Note: The railway reported the operating costs for goods traffic in 1831 to be eight shillings a ton) When the Old Quay Company later significantly reduced its freight charges, they were bought out by Egerton personally (1843) and the previous charges reinstated: the Bridgewater trust then bought the company from him (for over half a million pounds) once they had obtained the requisite powers. After the railway was absorbed into the London and North Western Railway, there was a brief period of fierce competition for goods traffic, with the rate for transport of cotton from Liverpool to Manchester dropping by two-thirds. A more profitable modus vivendi was soon restored, however; in 1858, after the canal had joined the railway conference on freight rates, the Liverpool Mail thought it 'notorious that the exorbitant rates for railway and water carriage between Liverpool and Manchester are kept up by means of powerful combinations between the Railway interest and the Bridgewater Canal interest'

Hence, although Egerton offered on succeeding to the Bridgewater estate to pay for a large statue of the Duke of Bridgewater in Manchester if the town authorities would identify a suitable site for it the offer was never taken up.

=== The Right Honourable Lord Francis Egerton, MP ===
The Bridgewater estate was commercially important in South Lancashire; its landholdings and associated tenant farmers also made it a major power in South Lancashire parliamentary elections and Egerton's succession of his Whig father as beneficiary changed the political arithmetic of the constituency. At the 1835 general election, he and another Conservative candidate defeated the two sitting pro-Reform MPs; Egerton topped the poll. At the 1837 election, the Manchester Guardian pointed out that Egerton had voted in only twenty-seven of the 171 divisions in the preceding session of the Commons: (Note: In 1837, the principal manager of the Bridgewater estates resigned, and was replaced by James Loch, already acting for Egerton's brother the Duke of Sutherland, and returned (unopposed, on the Duke's nomination) as a Whig MP for the Wick Burghs; thereafter Egerton regularly paired with Loch) nonetheless, Egerton again headed the poll, with his Conservative colleague second. In 1841, his election address claimed he was guided by the interests of manufacturing rather than agriculture: "I presume that the man who is in the centre of a strictly rural population will look to its wishes and apparent interests. I shall do likewise: and if he looks to his ricks I shall look to my chimnies and those of my neighbours"

He opposed repeal of the Corn Laws but thought it time for a 'full careful and dispassionate' revision of the current 'sliding scale'. He was returned unopposed and his victory speech put less stress on the need for revision, but deprecated cries of 'No surrender' on the Corn Law question; it was not a constitutional issue.

Egerton was Major commanding the Duke of Lancaster's Yeomanry, who were called out to support the civil power during the Plug Plot riots of 1842; Egerton and a troop of yeomanry served in Preston in the aftermath of the riot and fatal shootings there. He later intervened in a Commons debate to defend the conduct of the Preston magistrates and of the military whilst noting that Preston was an exceptional case: in the Lancashire disturbances there had been a "general absence of a sanguinary disposition, or a spirit of wanton violence" (Note: Preston was exceptional, he thought, for two reasons: the military force was too small to overawe the rioters and - by an evil chance- there was a pile of cobble stones in the street where the soldiers had faced the rioters)

In June 1844, Egerton's eldest son George came of age, and a rumour was promptly reported that Egerton was soon to be made Duke of Bridgewater, with George then to stand for South Lancashire. (However Egerton was not the nearest descendant of the last Duke and it was therefore unlikely that that title would be revived for him.) Later in the year, the electoral register was revised; consequently the Anti-Corn Law League which had coordinated a registration drive of voters favouring repeal of the Corn Laws became confident that they had secured a majority for 'free trade' in South Lancashire, and that Egerton would not be re-elected.

When in 1845 Egerton voted for an increase in the Maynooth Grant, he received many letters from his constituents complaining, and accusing him of betraying all he had stood for. He wrote to a Manchester paper to defend himself. His views had been consistent throughout his career, as witness his 1825 motion; nor had he sought to hide them - in 1835 he had drawn attention to having been nominated by a Catholic. He had no intention of changing his views: he would not seek re-election. However, he was not a martyr to Maynooth, but to disease: at the moment he was unable to write with his right hand. He regretted that his views differed from those of his constituents, but if "government was to be administered on the basis that our Roman Catholic fellow-citizens were idolaters", he would be glad to be free of any responsibility for the consequences. (Note: A correspondent to the Bolton Chronicle signing himself 'Protestant' then took Egerton to task for not thinking the Mass idolatrous: "The whole nation, as one man, not only regret Popery, but also denounce it as superstitious and idolatrous; and will you, my lord, oppose your country's wish?... God grant that your lordship may be induced to reconsider the matter and yet to stand firm by your Bible and the Church of your fathers")

Peel, who had decided upon the repeal of the Corn Laws against the previous policy of the Conservatives (and against the wishes of many Conservative MPs), chose Egerton to move the Loyal Address in January 1846. Doing so, Egerton admitted his views had changed; he now supported free trade. He did so not on any theoretical basis but from his own experience:

"I myself have been compelled to be a somewhat close observer of the connexion between the prices of provisions, and the employment and happiness of the people. Accident has cast my lot in the midst of a dense population, with respect to a large portion of which, this accident has made me a distributor of work and wages; and I have seen the operation of what I believe to be the connexion between the prices of provisions, and the happiness and employment of the people in various conditions."

The last period of high food prices in 1841–1842 had seen social unrest in the manufacturing districts of Lancashire, which no one who had witnessed it could wish to see return. Furthermore, government intervention on food supply and prices was politically unwise:

" ..my observation has led me to believe that if you, as a Government, undertake to control and regulate the supply of the means of subsistence to the community, you will find that it is difficult, nay, impossible for you, spread the public table with what profusion you may, to satisfy those who would still retire from the feast with appetites not altogether satiated, and with minds not fully convinced that they have had sufficient for their health, and that all that remains for them is to pray that they may be truly thankful. The abundance, which you call sufficient, but which no man can call excessive, is, after all, but matter of comparison. "

as would be prolonged and bitter argument on the question: "There are dark spots and weak places in various parts of our social system: let us not be blind to them, or neglect the duty of exposing them, with the view of mending and improving them. Let us not fling in one another's teeth difficulties, remedial or irremedial, for the sole purpose of party or of faction. Let us not fling in the face of one class a Wiltshire labourer; or a manufacturing labourer in the face of another. To meet the cases of both – to give them, in the first instance, food – to give them other luxuries which many of them still need – air, water, drainage – to give them all the physical and moral advantages possible; let that be our employment and our duty, and let us endeavour to perform that office by ridding the country of those subjects of angry discussion to which I have referred."

=== Earl of Ellesmere ===
In Peel's resignation honours (June 1846), Egerton was the only person raised to the peerage. He became Earl of Ellesmere and Baron Brackley (a revival of titles formerly held as subsidiary titles by the Earls of Bridgewater). The Times commented on Egerton's elevation: "The only other circumstance of a Ministerial 'going out' worth mention is the reported elevation of Lord Francis Egerton to the Upper House. His Lordship's position by birth and inheritance is so splendid, and so thoroughly sustained by his character and talents, that his accession to the Peerage seems little more than the correction of an accidental anomaly. He adds, at least, as much to the credit of the order as he can possibly receive in return."

Ellesmere served on the Commons Select Committee on the affairs of New Zealand in 1844, and was a member of the Canterbury Association from 27 March 1848. In 1849, the chief surveyor of the Canterbury Association, Joseph Thomas, named Lake Ellesmere in New Zealand after him.

== Writings, travels and art patronage ==
Ellesmere's claims to remembrance are founded chiefly on his services to literature and the fine arts. Before he was twenty he printed for private circulation a volume of poems, which he followed up after a short interval by the publication of a translation of Goethe's Faust, one of the earliest that appeared in England; a further volume containing some translations of German lyrics and a few original poems soon followed. Egerton's translation of Faust ( which predates the publication of Faust (part two) by Goethe) was criticised by a subsequent translator as betraying incomprehension of the original and having sacrificed Goethe's sense and artistic judgement to Egerton's preference for a pretty rhyme. The Examiner seized on this, asking 'Why did he not learn German, and translate into prose?'.

Other literary translations by Egerton included Wallenstein's Camp, Hernani, and Catherine of Cleves (from the elder Dumas's Henri III et sa cour): although these were published they had been originally made for use in Egerton's private theatricals. In 1831, Egerton put on in a private theatre at Bridgewater House (his town house) a production of his Hernani in which both he and Fanny Kemble appeared; Queen Adelaide and 'most of the Royal Family' attended. Egerton took the chair at the farewell dinner given by the Garrick Club to Charles Kemble when the latter retired from the stage.

A persistent sufferer from gout and lumbago, he spent the winter of 1839 in Rome for his health (and that of his eldest son), and in the spring and summer of 1840 visited the Holy Land, Egypt, and Greece subsequently recording his impressions in Sketches on the Coast of the Mediterranean (1843). He published several other works in prose and verse, including a translation of Raumer's History of the sixteenth and seventeenth centuries, illustrated by original documents: (Note: The translation linked to is anonymous, but date and publisher would support it being by Egerton) a review in Fraser's Magazine spoke favorably of it and of Egerton's oeuvre to date. When in 1838 he became rector of King's College, Aberdeen, the official speech of welcome claimed that even ignoring his illustrious birth, his literary reputation would still give him a good claim to the post; however Egerton eventually withdrew his literary works and forbade their re-printing. He was the first president of the Camden Society.

As an admirer of the Duke of Wellington, he became very interested in the historical writings of the Prussian military theorist General Carl von Clausewitz (1789–1831). He was involved in the discussion that ultimately compelled Wellington to write an essay in response to Clausewitz's study of the Waterloo campaign of 1815. Ellesmere himself anonymously published a translation of Clausewitz's The Campaign of 1812 in Russia (London: J. Murray, 1843), a subject in which Wellington was also deeply interested.

Lord Ellesmere was a munificent and yet discriminating patron of artists. To the collection of pictures which he inherited from his great-uncle, the 3rd Duke of Bridgewater, he made numerous additions, (Note: He commissioned from Landseer The Return from Hawking which included portraits of the Egertons and favourite relations, servants and animals.) and he built a gallery to which the public were allowed free access. Lord Ellesmere served as president of the Royal Geographical Society and as president of the Royal Asiatic Society (1849–1852), and he was a trustee of the National Gallery. He also initiated the collection of the National Portrait Gallery, by donating the Chandos portrait of Shakespeare.

== Family ==
On 18 June 1822, at St George's, Hanover Square he was married to Harriet Catherine Greville, a daughter of Charles Greville (1762–1832), a great-great-granddaughter of the 5th Baron Brooke. The Archbishop of York officiated and the Duke of Wellington (whose private secretary was a brother of the bride) was one of the witnesses.

They had eleven children, including:

- George Egerton, 2nd Earl of Ellesmere (15 June 1823 – 19 September 1862);
- Hon. Francis Egerton (15 September 1824 – 15 December 1895), who became an admiral, and was a Member of Parliament for two constituencies; he married in 1865 (Lady) Louisa Caroline née Cavendish, daughter of the 7th Duke of Devonshire (by marriage); they had issue;
- Hon. Algernon Fulke Egerton (31 December 1825 – 14 July 1891), who was a Member of Parliament for three constituencies, and married in 1863 Hon. Alice Louisa Cavendish, a niece of the 7th Duke of Devonshire; they had issue;
- Hon. Arthur Frederick Egerton (6 February 1829 – 25 February 1866), who became Lieutenant-Colonel, and married in 1858 Helen Smith, daughter of Martin Tucker Smith and his wife, Louisa Ridley; they had issue;
- Lady Alice Harriet Frederica Egerton (10 October 1830 – 22 December 1928), who married George Byng, 3rd Earl of Strafford in 1854; they had no issue;
- Lady Blanche Egerton (22 February 1832 – 20 March 1894), who married John Montagu, 7th Earl of Sandwich in 1865 as his second wife; they had no issue;
- Hon. Granville Egerton (baptised 28 October 1834 – 1851), who was killed by the bursting of his gun when shooting in California - at the time he was a midshipman on HMS Maeander returning from the East India station via California to collect treasure; unmarried, seemingly no issue.

In 1846 he was raised to the peerage as Earl of Ellesmere, of Ellesmere in the County of Salop, with the subsidiary title Viscount Brackley, of Brackley in the County of Northampton. Viscount Ellesmere and Baron Brackley had been subsidiary titles of the Earls of Bridgewater until the extinction of that title in 1829.

When in town, the family lived at Bridgewater House, St. James' Park; their country seats were Oatlands, (Note: advertised after it was vacated by Egerton as 'a princely residence affording accommodation of every kind for any person of the highest rank… a particularly well-timbered park of 556 acres, ornamented with a fine lake, nearly one mile in length… most delightful and extensive pleasure-grounds, in which is the far-famed grotto and numerous stone vases and pedestals') which Egerton rented until 1843; Worsley, (from 1837) where Egerton later replaced the existing hall (described as neither commodious for the family, nor agreeable to his Lordship's taste) at a cost of £100,000. After leaving Oatlands, their Surrey seat was Hatchford Park, Cobham, Surrey, where Lady Ellesmere laid out the gardens. Her mother, Lady Charlotte Greville (née Cavendish-Bentinck) died at Hatchford Park on 28 July 1862, aged 86.

Francis died on 18 February 1857 at Bridgwater House, St. James' Park; and was succeeded by his first son, George. On the extinction of the senior line of the Dukedom of Sutherland in 1963, his great-great-grandson, the fifth Earl, succeeded as 6th Duke of Sutherland.

== Notes ==
Parliament of the United Kingdom
Preceded by Marquess of Titchfield; Edward Henry Edwardes	Member of Parliament for Bletchingley; 1822–1826; With: Edward Henry Edwardes	Succeeded by Charles Tennyson; William Russell
Preceded by George Macpherson-Grant	Member of Parliament for Sutherland; 1826–1831	Succeeded by Sir Hugh Innes, Bt
Preceded by George Wood; Viscount Molyneux	Member of Parliament for South Lancashire; 1835–1846; With: Richard Bootle-Wilbraham 1835–1844; William Entwisle 1844–1846	Succeeded by William Brown; William Entwisle
Political offices
Preceded by Lord Stanley	Under-Secretary of State for War and the Colonies; 1828	Succeeded by Horace Twiss
Preceded by William Lamb	Chief Secretary for Ireland; 1828–1830	Succeeded by Sir Henry Hardinge
Preceded by Sir Henry Hardinge	Secretary at War; 1830	Succeeded by Charles Williams-Wynn
Academic offices
Unknown	Rector of the University of Aberdeen; 1841 – Date unknown	Unknown
Honorary titles
Preceded by The Earl of Sefton	Lord Lieutenant of Lancashire; 1855–1857	Succeeded by The Earl of Burlington
Peerage of the United Kingdom
New creation	Earl of Ellesmere; 1846–1857	Succeeded by George Egerton
Professional and academic associations
New post	President of the Historic Society of Lancashire and Cheshire; 1848–1854	Succeeded by Charles, 3rd Earl of Sefton
