= Edward Bagley =

British politician (1876–1961)

Bagley in June 1922.

Edward Albert Ashton Bagley (1876 – 5 November 1961) was a British soldier and Member of Parliament.

Born in Coningsby, in Lincolnshire, Bagley became the organising secretary of the North Western Counties region of the Tariff Reform League, and he wrote widely on economics and labour. He also joined the Conservative Party, and stood unsuccessfully in Leicester in the January 1910 UK general election, and in Radcliffe-cum-Farnworth in December 1910.

Early in 1915, he joined the Royal Army Service Corps as an officer, serving in Egypt and Palestine. He was elected for Farnworth at the 1918 UK general election, but lost the seat in 1922, and did not stand for Parliament again.
