= Rowson =

Rowson is a first name and surname. Notable people with the surname include:

- David Rowson (born 1976), Scottish footballer
- Guy Rowson (1883–1937), English politician
- James Rowson (born 1976), American baseball player and coach
- Jonathan Rowson (born 1977), Scottish chess grandmaster and writer
- Leslie Rowson (1903–1977), English cinematographer
- Martin Rowson (born 1959), English cartoonist and writer
- Susanna Rowson (1762–1824), British-American writer, poet, and playwright
