= Theodore Taylor (politician) =

British politician

Theodore Cooke Taylor

Theodore Cooke Taylor (3 August 1850 – 19 October 1952) was a British businessman and Liberal Party politician. He was best known for pioneering profit-sharing in his business activities and for leading a movement against the opium trade.

Taylor was born in Carlinghow, Batley, Yorkshire and was the eldest son of Joshua Taylor and his wife Alice née Cooke. Both sides of the family were involved in the textile industry: the Taylors had been making cloth since the eighteenth century in Batley, while Alice Cooke's father had established a carpet manufacturing business at Liversedge.

Following education at Batley Grammar School and Silcoates School near Wakefield, Theodore joined the family business of J T & J Taylor Limited in 1866. In 1891 he became head of Taylor's and in the following year bought out the other partners to become its sole proprietor. His object in taking control was to institute a system of profit-sharing, and in 1896 he transformed the business into a private limited company. The new company, after paying five per cent on capital, distributed the remaining profits to all workers employed for a year or more. Eventually the majority of the share ownership passed to the workforce, and at Taylor's death in 1952 more than 75% of the company's capital was shared between 2,000 workers.

T C Taylor was politically aligned to the Liberal Party, and was elected to the West Riding County Council on its creation in 1889. At the 1900 general election he was elected as Member of Parliament for Radcliffe cum Farnworth in Lancashire. He held the seat for eighteen years, retiring from parliament when the seat was abolished in 1918.

In 1906 Taylor began a campaign to halt the Indo-Chinese opium trade, winning the support of the new Liberal government of Henry Campbell-Bannerman. The trade was finally ended in 1917.

Following his retirement from parliamentary politics, Taylor continued actively to manage the textile business, while promoting the benefits of profit-sharing. He was a member of the Congregational Church, which he supported financially. He also sought to promote education by allowing his employees to attend technical colleges and by providing scholarships to his former school, Silcoates.

T C Taylor was twice married. In 1874 he married his first cousin, Sara Jane Ingraham. They had three children. Sara Jane and their eldest daughter, Evelyn Sarah, died in the influenza pandemic of 1919. His second marriage was in 1920 to Mary Isabella McVean.

In 1950 Taylor celebrated his centenary. He was still the managing director and chairman of J T and T Taylor's, and the company's employees enjoyed a day trip to the seaside resort of Blackpool. He continued to travel from his home at Grassington, in Wharfedale, to the mills in Batley until three weeks before his death at the age of 102.

His exact age at death was 102 years and 67 days, making him at the time the longest-lived MP. That record was unsurpassed until beaten by Ronald Atkins (1916–2020) in 2018.

Parliament of the United Kingdom
Preceded by John James Mellor	Member of Parliament for Radcliffe cum Farnworth; 1900–1918	Constituency abolished
