= Sir William Agnew, 1st Baronet =

English politician and art dealer

- Agnew in 1880

Personal details
- Born: 31 December 1825
- Died: 31 October 1910 (aged 84)
- Spouse: Mary Kenworthy (m. 1851)
- Parent(s): Thomas Agnew; Jane Garnet Lockett

Sir William Agnew, 1st Baronet (20 October 1825 – 31 October 1910) was an English politician and prominent art dealer who was said to have dominated the British market for 30 years. Thomas Agnew & Sons, his London art business in Mayfair, flourished as one of the leading art dealerships in London from 1860, still with the family until 2013 when sold and known as "Agnew's Gallery", or more informally "Agnew's". On being created baronet in 1895, he was described as "the greatest art publisher and dealer in England".

== Life ==
In the middle of the 1860s, Agnew and his brother Thomas provided much needed financial backing to the publishing firm Bradbury and Evans, becoming partners in the business. Agnew became a Liberal member of parliament, first for South East Lancashire between 1880 and 1885 and later for Stretford from 1885 to 1886. He was created a baronet, of Great Stanhope Street, London, in 1895.

He bought the Rougham estates in Suffolk, England, in 1904.

== Art ==
Agnew was a prominent art dealer who amassed a large collection through his business. By 1887 it was said that, "no one could have secured so complete a collection of British Art". He had offices in London, Manchester and Liverpool and was aided by his sons and nephew. He sold works to and helped form the great private art collections of the age, including those of Henry Tate and Lord Iveagh. He also promoted many leading painters and dominated the art market for thirty years.

== Family ==
He was the son of Thomas Agnew (1794–1871) and his wife Jane Garnet Lockett.

On 25 March 1851, he married Mary Kenworthy (before 1836 – 2 September 1892), daughter of George Pixton Kenworthy. Their children were:

- Mary Caroline Agnew, died 2 February 1888
- Florence Agnew, died 2 September 1890
- Sir George William Agnew, 2nd Baronet (19 January 1852 – 19 December 1941)
- Charles Morland Agnew (14 December 1855 – 23 May 1931)
- Walter Agnew (29 April 1861 – 17 April 1915)
- Philip Leslie Agnew (30 June 1863 – 5 March 1938)

Agnew's modern descendants include Sir John Keith Agnew, 6th Baronet (1950–2011), and John Stuart Agnew, a parliamentary candidate of the UK Independence Party.

== Notes ==
Parliament of the United Kingdom
| Preceded by Algernon Egerton and Edward Hardcastle | Member of Parliament for South East Lancashire; 1880–1885; With: Robert Leake | Constituency abolished |
| New constituency | Member of Parliament for Stretford; 1885–1886 | Succeeded by John Maclure |
Baronetage of the United Kingdom
| New creation | Baronet (of Great Stanhope Street); 1895–1910 | Succeeded by George William Agnew |
