= South East Lancashire =

Parliamentary constituency in the United Kingdom, 1868–1885

- Former county constituency for the House of Commons

1868–1885
- Seats: two
- Created from: South Lancashire
- Replaced by: Eccles, Gorton, Heywood, Middleton, Prestwich, Radcliffe-cum-Farnworth, Stretford and Westhoughton

South East Lancashire was a county constituency of the House of Commons of the Parliament of the United Kingdom. It was represented by two Members of Parliament. The constituency was created by the Reform Act 1867 by the splitting of the South Lancashire constituency into South-West and South-East divisions.

The constituency was abolished by the Redistribution of Seats Act 1885, being divided into eight single member divisions of Eccles, Radcliffe-cum-Farnworth, Gorton, Heywood, Middleton, Prestwich, Stretford and Westhoughton.

== Boundaries ==
This constituency comprised the Salford hundred of Lancashire except for those parts of the hundred lying in the Parliamentary boroughs of Ashton-under-Lyne, Bolton, Bury, Manchester, Rochdale, Salford and Stalybridge.

== Members of Parliament ==
- Constituency created (1868)

Election	1st Member	1st Party	2nd Member	2nd Party
1868	Algernon Egerton	Conservative	John Snowdon Henry	Conservative
1874	Algernon Egerton	Conservative	Edward Hardcastle	Conservative
1880	Robert Leake	Liberal	William Agnew	Liberal
1885	Constituency abolished			

== Elections ==
General election 1868: South East Lancashire
Party	Candidate	Votes	%	±%
Conservative	Algernon Egerton	8,290	27.4	
Conservative	John Snowdon Henry	8,012	26.5	
Liberal	Frederick Peel	7,024	23.2	
Liberal	Henry Yates Thompson	6,953	23.0	
Majority		988	3.3	
Turnout		15,140 (est)	78.3 (est)	
Registered electors		19,340		
Conservative win (new seat)				
Conservative win (new seat)				

General election 1874: South East Lancashire
Party	Candidate	Votes	%	±%
Conservative	Algernon Egerton	9,187	27.7	+0.3
Conservative	Edward Hardcastle	9,015	27.2	+0.7
Liberal	Peter Rylands	7,464	22.5	−0.7
Liberal	John Edward Taylor	7,453	22.5	−0.5
Majority		1,551	4.7	+1.4
Turnout		16,560 (est)	77.3 (est)	−1.0
Registered electors		21,427		
Conservative hold		Swing	+0.5	
Conservative hold		Swing	+0.6	

General election 1880: South East Lancashire
Party	Candidate	Votes	%	±%
Liberal	Robert Leake	11,313	26.0	+3.5
Liberal	William Agnew	11,291	25.9	+3.4
Conservative	Algernon Egerton	10,569	24.2	−3.5
Conservative	Edward Hardcastle	10,419	23.9	−3.3
Majority		894	2.1	N/A
Majority		722	1.7	N/A
Turnout		21,796 (est)	83.7 (est)	+6.4
Registered electors		26,037		
Liberal gain from Conservative		Swing	+3.5	
Liberal gain from Conservative		Swing	+3.4	

== Sources ==
- Leigh Rayment's Historical List of MPs – Constituencies beginning with "L" (part 1)
