= Molyneux =

Surname of French origin

- Canting arms of Molyneux: Azure, a cross moline or

Origin
- Language: Old French
- Meaning: "Moulineaux", derived from the French Moulin (meaning "mill of the waters")
- Region of origin: France

Other names
- Variant forms: Mullenax, Mullinax, Molinex, Mullinix, Mullenneix, Mullennix, Mullenix, Mullineaux, Molinieux, Molinaux, Molineaux, Mollineaux, Molineux, Mulling, Molyneaux, Mullinax, Mollinux, Millineux

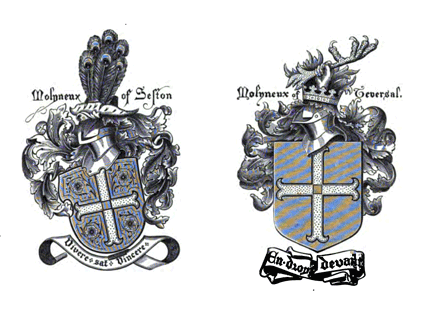
Shields showing differing crests of branches of the Molyneux family

Molyneux (/ˈmɒlɪnjuː/; Old French: De Molines or De Moulins) is a surname of French origin. The surname has been linked primarily to a large French family that settled in Lancashire, England. By the 14th century the Molyneux family had split into three main branches: the Lancashire line, who became the Earls of Sefton; the Nottingham line; and the Calais line, from those remaining in France. There was also a branch of the family who were Irish baronets.

== Etymology and history ==
The ancestors of the Molyneaux family arrived in England in medieval times. The name "de Molines" or "de Moulins", Old French in origin, meaning "Mill", and eventually changed into "Molyneux". The early historical background of the family is sparse, coming from scattered genealogical, historical, and archaeological sources, composed of a mixture of legend, romanticized literary invention, and fact. Some historians deduce the de Moulins came from Moulineaux-sur-Seine, near Rouen, in Normandy.

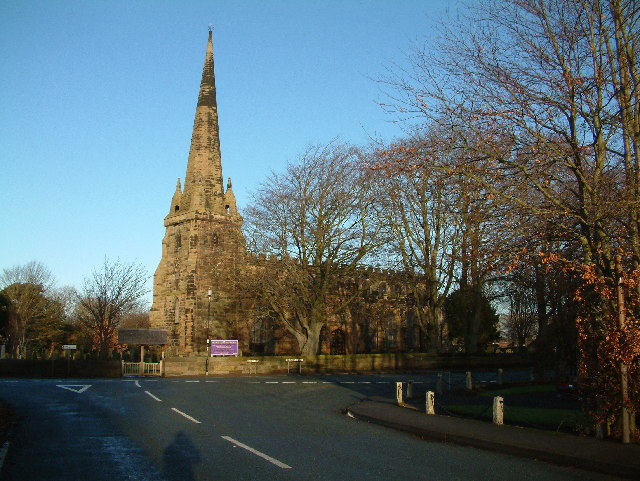
St. Helen's Church was built as the Molyneux family chapel in Sefton Merseyside in 1170.

Other sources claim the family originally came from Moulins, France in the region of Auvergne-Rhône-Alpes in central France. Wherever their origin, Robert de Moulins' son, William, settled in Lancashire. He had two sons, William and Vivian de Moulins. William was granted large tracts of land in Lancashire, in what was then called inter Mersam et Ripam, that is, "between the Mersey and the Ribble", and the manors of Septon (Sefton), Thornton, Cuerden, ten carucates and a half of land, at the service of half a knight's fee. William Molyneux made Septon his chief seat and was succeeded by Vivian de Molyneux.

They also held the manor of Little Crosby, later Ince Blundell Hall, which had been held by one Uctred until 1066. By 1212 it was owned by Richard de Molyneux of Sefton before being turned over to the Blundell family. The Molyneuxs later owned most of the districts of Speke and Rainhill. The Royalist gentry family held a large moated manor, a corn mill on the River Alt, and the advowson of St. Helen's Church at Sefton without interruption from about 1100 to 1700. Their successors, by then Earls, moved to Croxteth Hall. Of the Sefton Molyneux family, crusaders Richard (d. 1290) and William Molyneux (d. 1320) are entombed within the church, and are its oldest inhabitants. Their effigies now lie beneath an arch moulding set into the wall in the Molyneux chapel, which is outside the 14th-century church walls.

In 1436 the office of Hereditary Steward of the Wapentake of Salfordshire was granted to Sir Robert Molyneux of Sefton. The office was held by Sir Robert's successors (descendants of his brother Richard), the Earls of Sefton until 1972. It was the Lancashire line of the family that became the Viscounts Molyneux and later the Earls of Sefton, while there were also branches seated at Nottingham and Calais.

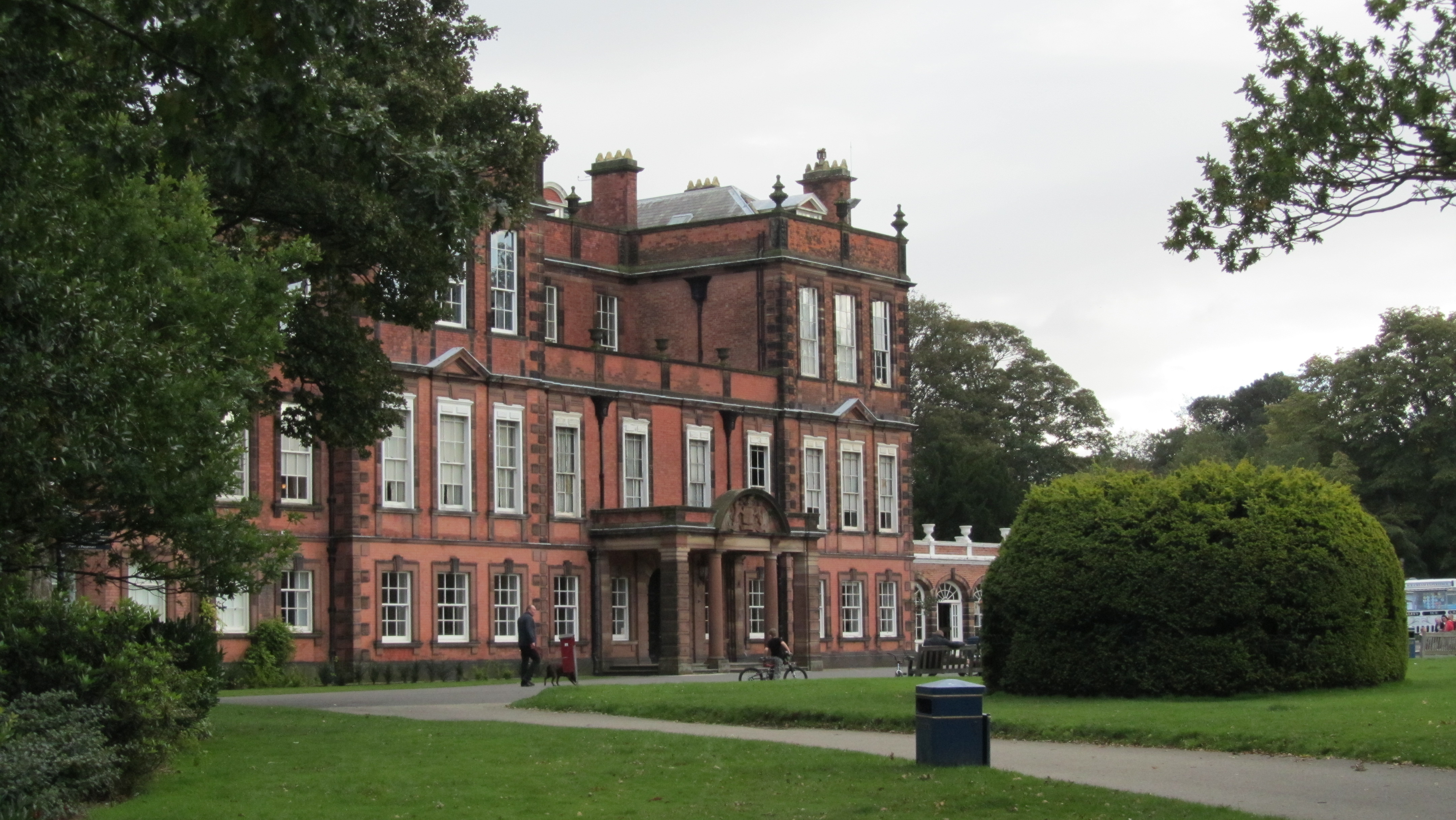
Croxteth Hall, Home of the Earls of Sefton branch of the Molyneux family.

The senior branch of the Sefton family had been staunch Catholics and Royalists (notably in the 17th and 18th centuries) through the worst times until Charles Molyneux, 8th Viscount Molyneux, was rewarded for converting to the Protestant faith. The relatively youthful second and third Viscounts fought on the Royalist side both politically and militarily. Although Liverpool Castle had been partly dismantled in 1660–1678, Caryll Molyneux, the 3rd Viscount, had used it for storing arms. During the reign of King James II, he was outlawed by Parliament for supporting the deposed king in 1688 to 1689. Control of the Castle finally passed out of Molyneux hands after Caryll had again been suspected of participation in a Jacobite plot. William, the 7th Viscount, was a Jesuit, and there were in his time not less than seven Molyneux in the Society of Jesus alone.

== Variations ==
Variations of the surname include "Mullinax", "Mullenax", "Molinex", "Mullinix", "Mullenneix", "Mullennix", "Mullineaux", "Molinieux", "Molinaux", "Molineaux", "Mollineaux", "Molineux", "Mulleneux" among others.

== Notable people with the name ==
=== Molyneux ===
- David Molyneux (born 1943), British parasitologist, professor and former director of the Liverpool School of Tropical Medicine
- Echlin Molyneux (c. 1800–1886), Irish barrister and professor of English Law, Dublin
- Edward Molyneux (1891–1974), British fashion designer working in Paris
- Emery Molyneux (died 1598), English Elizabethan maker of globes, mathematical instruments and ordnance
- Harold Molyneux (1896–1985), Canadian military aviator
- Irene Molyneux (1923–2019), English lawn bowls competitor
- Isabella Molyneux, Countess of Sefton (c. 1748–1819), wife of the 1st Earl of Sefton
- John Molyneux (VC) (1890–1972), British soldier, recipient of the Victoria Cross
- John Molyneux (disambiguation), several people
- Joyce Molyneux (1931–2022), British chef
- Juan Pablo Molyneux (born 1946), Chilean-American interior designer
- Malcolm Molyneux (1943-2021), British malaria researcher
- Maxine Molyneux (born 1948), British sociologist and feminist
- Paul Molyneux (1906–1980), English cricketer
- Peter Molyneux (born 1959), British computer game designer
- Robert Molyneux (1738–1808), English-American priest, president of Georgetown University
- Samuel Molyneux (1689–1728), British astronomer and Member of Parliament (son of William)
- Stefan Molyneux (born 1966), Canadian white nationalist and conspiracy theorist
- Stephen Molyneux (born 1955), British educational technologist and Microsoft Professor Emeritus in Advanced Learning Technology
- Thomas Molyneux (statesman) (1531–1597), French-born statesman in Ireland
- Sir Thomas Molyneux, 1st Baronet (1661–1733), Irish physician, great-grandson of the earlier Sir Thomas, and brother of William
- Tim Molyneux (born 1969), American actor, singer, writer, director and producer
- Tom Molyneux (1890–1955), Canadian ice hockey player
- William Molyneux (1656–1698), Irish natural philosopher, and father of Samuel
- (maternal) Lorraine Bracco's mother was an Englishwoman named Eileen Molyneux.

=== Viscount Molyneux ===
For Viscount Molyneux see Earl of Sefton, and in particular:

- Richard Molyneux, 1st Viscount Molyneux (1594–1636)
- Richard Molyneux, 2nd Viscount Molyneux (1620–1654)
- Caryll Molyneux, 3rd Viscount Molyneux (1624–1699)
- William Molyneux, 7th Viscount Molyneux (1685–1759)
- Charles William Molyneux, 1st Earl of Sefton (1748–1794), previously 8th Viscount Molyneux
- William Philip Molyneux, 2nd Earl of Sefton (1772–1838)
- Charles William Molyneux, 3rd Earl of Sefton (1796–1855)
- William Philip Molyneux, 4th Earl of Sefton (1835–1897)
- Charles Molyneux, 5th Earl of Sefton (1867–1901)
- Osbert Molyneux, 6th Earl of Sefton (1871–1930)
- Hugh William Osbert Molyneux, 7th Earl of Sefton (1898–1972)

=== Molyneaux ===
Molyneaux is a rare Irish spelling variant. People with this spelling variant include:

- James Molyneaux (1920–2015), Baron Molyneaux of Killead, Ulster politician
- Jerry Molyneaux (born 1958), athlete who represented the British Virgin Islands at the 1984 Olympics
- Jerry Molyneaux (sports administrator) (1955–2016), Irish Gaelic games player and administrator
- Joseph W. Molyneaux, American federal judge
- Lee Molyneaux, English footballer
- Vince Molyneaux, American baseball player

=== Molineaux ===
- Tom Molineaux (1784–1818), African-American bare-knuckle boxer
- Othello Molineaux (born 1939), Trinidadian jazz steelpan player

=== Molineux ===
- Thomas Molineux (luthier) (c.1700–1757), Irish luthier
- Thomas Molineux (stenographer) (1759–1850), English stenographer
- William Molineux (1717–1774), American participant in the Boston Tea Party
- Sophie Molineux (born 1998), Australian cricketer

=== Mollineux ===
- Mary Mollineux (1651–1696), English Quaker poet

=== Mullinix ===
- Tadd Mullinix, American musician performing as Dabrye
- Henry M. Mullinnix, aviator and Admiral of the United States Navy during World War II
- Siri Mullinix, American soccer goalkeeper

=== Mullinax ===
- Trey Mullinax, American professional golfer

=== Others ===
Other persons bearing the name Molyneux :

- Lord Henry Howard-Molyneux-Howard, brother of 12th Duke of Norfolk
- Molyneux Shuldham, 1st Baron Shuldham (c. 1717 – 1798), British naval officer and colonial governor of Newfoundland

== See also ==
- Molyneux Baronets
- Molineux (disambiguation)
- Moulineaux
- "My Kinsman, Major Molineux", short story by American author Nathaniel Hawthorne
