= William Molyneux (disambiguation) =

William Molyneux (1656–1698) was an Irish natural philosopher and writer on politics.

William Molyneux may also refer to:

- William Molyneux, 4th Viscount Molyneux (1655–1717)
- William Molyneux, 7th Viscount Molyneux (1685–1759), Jesuit priest
- Sir William Molyneux, 6th Baronet (died 1781), High Sheriff of Nottinghamshire 1737
- William Molyneux, 2nd Earl of Sefton (1772–1838), sportsman, gambler and a friend of the Prince Regent
- William Molyneux, 4th Earl of Sefton (1835–1897), British peer
- Bill Molyneux (William Mitchell Molyneux, born 1935), Australian horticulturist and author

== See also ==
- Molyneux
