= Portrait of Lady Molyneux =

1769 painting by Thomas Gainsborough

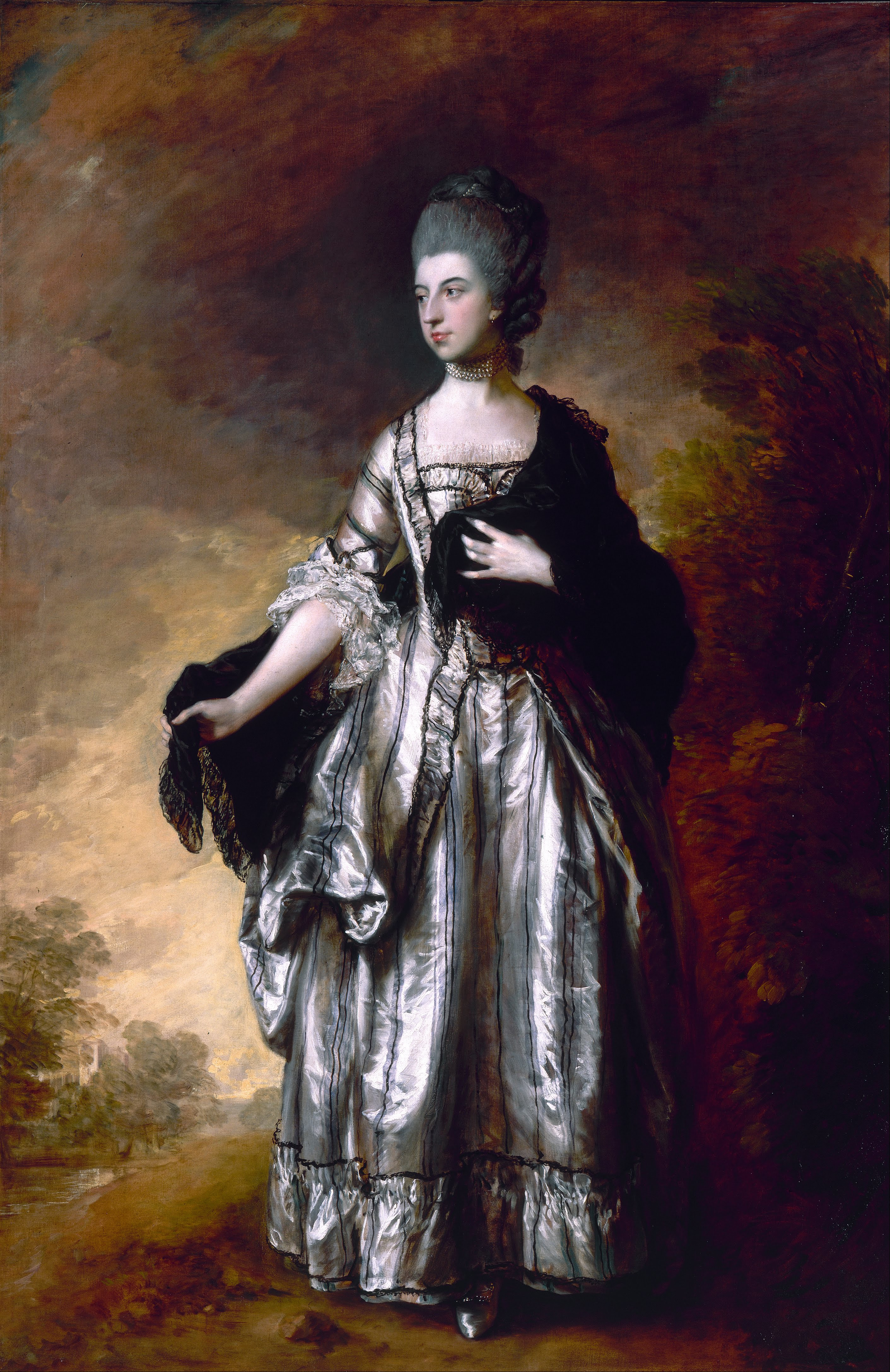
- Artist: Thomas Gainsborough
- Year: 1769
- Type: Oil on canvas, portrait painting
- Dimensions: 236 cm × 155 cm (93 in × 61 in)
- Location: Walker Art Gallery; Liverpool

Portrait of Lady Molyneux is an oil on canvas portrait painting by the British artist Thomas Gainsborough, from 1769. It depicts the English aristocrat Isabella Molyneux, Countess of Sefton. It was commissioned shortly after her wedding to the Irish politician Viscount Molyneux, who soon afterwards was made Earl of Sefton.

The painting was produced in the fashionable spa town of Bath, where Gainsborough then had his practice. He chose to display it at the Royal Academy Exhibition of 1769 in London, the first ever Summer Exhibition held by the Royal Academy, of which he was a founded member. The painting hung at the family seat Croxteth Hall for two centuries, before coming into the possession of the Walker Art Gallery, in Liverpool.

== Bibliography ==
- Hamilton, James. Gainsborough: A Portrait. Hachette UK, 2017.
- Lindsay, Jack. Thomas Gainsborough: His Life and Art. Granada, 1981.
- Postle, Martin. Thomas Gainsborough. Tate, 2002.
