= Listed buildings in Sefton, Merseyside =

Sefton is a civil parish and a village in the Metropolitan Borough of Sefton, Merseyside, England. It contains 19 buildings that are recorded in the National Heritage List for England as designated listed buildings. Of these, one is listed at Grade I, the highest of the three grades, and the others are at Grade II, the lowest grade. The parish contains the villages of Sefton and Lunt, and is otherwise rural. The listed buildings include houses, farmhouses and associated buildings, a church and associated structures, an ancient cross base, a public house, and a war memorial.

== Key ==
Grade	Criteria
I	Buildings of exceptional interest, sometimes considered to be internationally important
II	Buildings of national importance and special interest

== Buildings ==
Name and location	Photograph	Date	Notes	Grade
Cross base 53.50423°N 2.97170°W	—	Medieval (probable)	This consists of a square stone containing a square mortise. Thought to have been moved from elsewhere.	II
St Helen's Church; 53.50438°N 2.97121°W		14th century	Building of the church continued through the 15th and 16th centuries, it is mainly late Perpendicular in style, and it was restored between 1907 and 1922 by W. D. Caroe. It consists of a nave and a chancel in a single vessel, a clerestory, north and south aisles, a north chapel, a south porch, and a west steeple. The steeple consists of a tower with buttresses, a cornice, a parapet with gargoyles, beehive-shaped pinnacles, and a recessed spire with lucarnes. Around much of the church is an embattled parapet.	I
Orchard Farmhouse; 53.49327°N 2.98617°W	—	Early 17th century	A house in two storeys with an attic and three bays. The right bay is the oldest, and is in stone, the rest being in brick; the roof is in stone-slate. The windows on the lower storey of the right bay, and in the attic are mullioned; the others are horizontally-sliding sashes. Above the entrance is a large lintel.	II
Churchyard wall, St Helen's Church; 53.50401°N 2.97093°W	—	17th century	The wall is on the south and east sides of the churchyard. It is in stone, and incorporates a datestone inscribed 1826. The wall contains two lych gates.	II
Old Hall Farmhouse and barn 53.50186°N 2.97155°W	—	Late 17th century	The farmhouse and adjoining barn have been converted into houses. They are in brick on a stone base with stone dressings and have a slate roof. The building is in two storeys, the farmhouse was in four bays, and the barn in three. Some of the windows are mullioned, and others are casements.	II
Brook Farmhouse; 53.49644°N 2.96097°W	—	1691	A brick farmhouse with stone dressings and a slate roof. It is in two storeys and three bays, with a gabled plastered porch at the rear. The windows are casements, and above the entrance is a datestone.	II
Tythe Barn; 53.51058°N 2.98373°W	—	1693	The barn has been converted into two houses, It is in brick on a stone base with stone dressings and a slate roof. There are six bays and two storeys. Some windows are mullioned, and others are 20th-century casements. There is also a cart entrance and an external staircase.	II
Lunt House Farmhouse; 53.51030°N 2.98387°W	—	Early 18th century (possible)	A house in brick and stone with two storeys and three bays. The windows are casements, and the doorway has a segmental head. Inside is an inglenook fireplace with a bressumer beam and a smoke hood.	II
Tan House Farmhouse; 53.49518°N 2.99571°W	—	Early to mid 18th century (probable)	A brick house with stone dressings and a slate roof. It is in three storeys and two bays. The windows are casements. The central porch has a Dutch gable, and the entrance is round-headed. Above it is a stone plaque with rococo scroll work, a mask, and the Sefton arms. At the rear of the house is a lower, older wing on a stone base, with horizontally-sliding sash windows.	II
Grange Farmhouse and outbuilding 53.50216°N 2.97328°W	—	18th century	Originally a brewery, it was later converted into a house. The building is in brick with stone dressings and a slate roof. The house is in three storeys and three bays. It has a central round-headed doorway with a fanlight, sash windows with wedge lintels and, to the right, a canted bay window. The outbuilding is in two storeys, and has a hipped roof with a belvedere, and a segmental-headed entrance.	II
Manor House; 53.49569°N 2.96667°W	—	18th century	A brick house with stone dressings and a slate roof. It is in two storeys and has a three bay front. The windows are sashes with wedge lintels. The central round-headed entrance has pilasters decorated with foliage, a cornice, an open pediment with urns, and a fanlight.	II
Sundial; 53.50418°N 2.97113°W	—	18th century	The sundial is in the churchyard of St Helen's Church. It is in stone, and consists of a baluster with a square cap, and an octagonal plate with a gnomon.	II
Well House; 53.50439°N 2.97570°W	—	18th century	A brick house with a slate roof, in two storeys and two bays. The windows in the ground floor are casements, and in the upper floor they are horizontally-sliding sashes. On the right side is an illegible datestone and a blocked window, and at the rear is an outshut.	II
Mill Houses; 53.50434°N 2.97016°W		1753	Originally one house, later divided into two dwellings, it is in brick on a stone base with stone dressings. The house has three storeys and a front of two bays, with a single-bay extension to the left. The windows in the main block are sashes, and in the extension they are horizontally-sliding sashes. Above the doorway is a timber canopy, and over that is a datestone with the arms of the Molyneux family.	II
The Chestnuts; 53.50819°N 2.98525°W	—	Late 18th century	A brick house with stone dressings and a slate roof. It is in two storeys with an attic, and has a three bay front. There is a two-bay extension to the right containing a datestone inscribed 1853. The windows are sashes with wedge lintels. The round-headed doorway has Tuscan columns, a fluted frieze, an open pediment, and a fanlight.	II
Mill Cottages; 53.50398°N 2.97022°W	—	Late 18th century (probable)	A pair of brick houses, partly on a stone base, with a slate roof. They are in two storeys and five bays. On the left side is an outshut.	II
Manor Lodge House; 53.49652°N 2.96634°W	—	Early 19th century	A stuccoed house with a pyramidal roof, it has a square plan. The house is in a single storey and two bays. The central entrance has a pointed head, an architrave, and a fanlight. The windows also have pointed heads with hood moulds, and contain sashes. On the right side is a canted bay window.	II
Punch Bowl Hotel; 53.50454°N 2.97201°W		Early 19th century	A brick public house with stone dressings and a slate roof. The original block is in two storeys and has a two-bay front facing the road. The windows are sashes with wedge lintels. The central entrance is round-headed with panelled pilasters and a fanlight. At the rear is a large wing, and there is a 20th-century extension to the west.	II
War memorial 53.50393°N 2.97173°W		c. 1920	The war memorial is in stone, and possibly contains medieval material. A square base on four octagonal steps supports a chamfered shaft with a crucifix under a canopy. There are inscriptions on the steps.	II
