= Charles Molyneux =

Charles Molyneux may refer to:

- Charles Molyneux, 1st Earl of Sefton (1748–1795), British Whig politician
- Charles Molyneux, 3rd Earl of Sefton (1796–1855), British Whig politician
- Charles Molyneux, 5th Earl of Sefton (1867–1901)
