= Molyneux (disambiguation) =

Molyneux is a surname.

Molyneux may also refer to:

- Molyneux baronets
- Molyneux River, a former name for New Zealand's Clutha River
  - Molyneux Park, a sports ground in Alexandra, New Zealand, close to the Clutha River
  - Port Molyneux, a former town close to the river's mouth
- Molineux Stadium, home ground of Wolverhampton Wanderers Football Club
- Molyneux (ward), an electoral ward of the Sefton Metropolitan Borough Council, England

== See also ==
- Molyneux's problem, a philosophical thought experiment
- Molyneux globes, terrestrial and celestial spheres made by Emery Molyneux
- Molineux (disambiguation)
- Moulineaux, a commune in the Seine-Maritime department in the Normandy region in northern France
