= Isabella Molyneux, Countess of Sefton =

British noblewoman

Isabella Molyneux
- Countess of Sefton
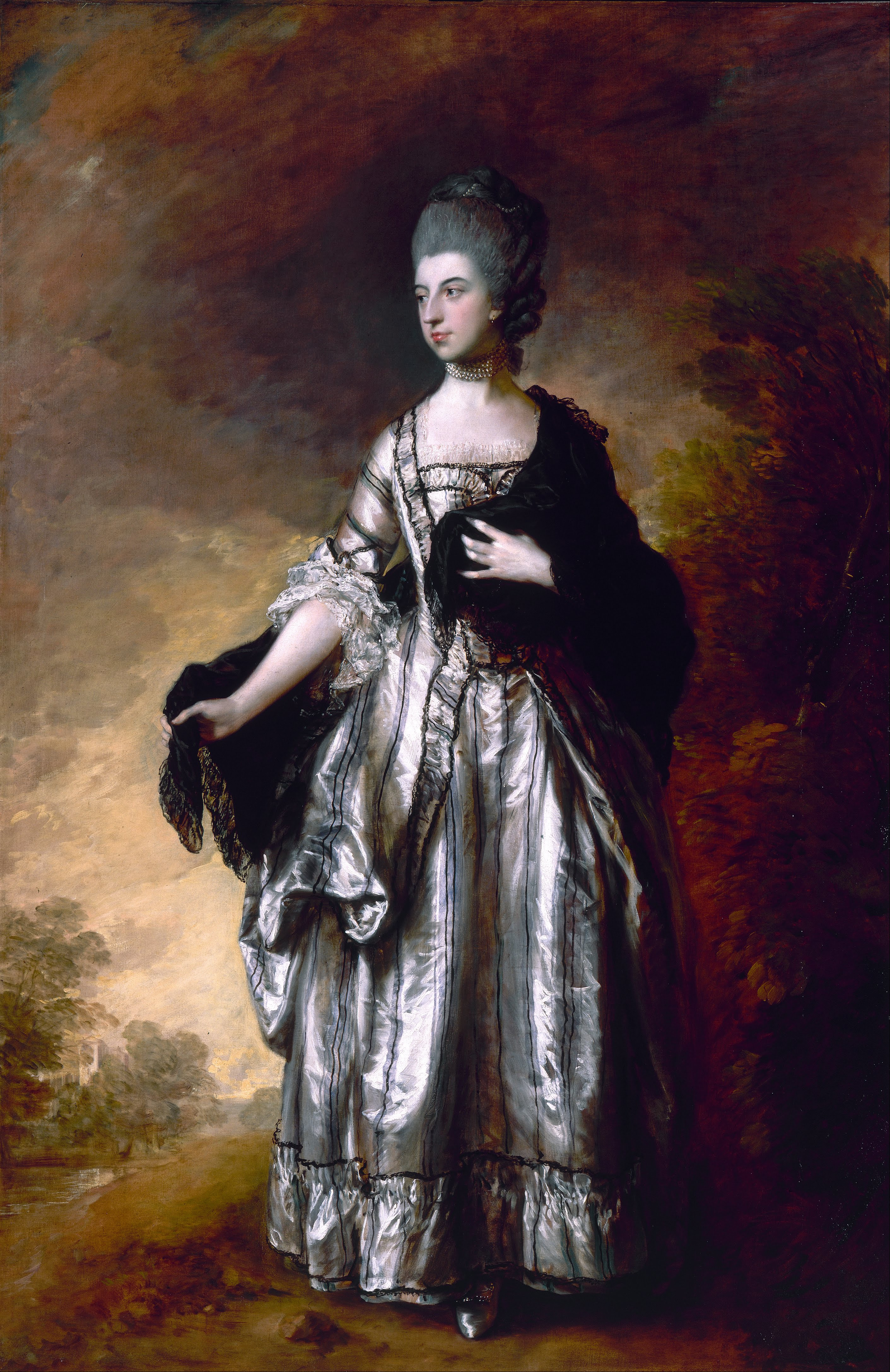
- Portrait of Lady Molyneux by Thomas Gainsborough, 1769
- Born: Isabella Stanhope c. 1748
- Died: 29 January 1819
- Noble family: Stanhope (by birth); Molyneux (by marriage)
- Spouse: Charles Molyneux, 1st Earl of Sefton
- Issue: William Molyneux, 2nd Earl of Sefton
- Father: William Stanhope, 2nd Earl of Harrington
- Mother: Lady Caroline FitzRoy

Isabella Molyneux, Countess of Sefton, formerly Viscountess Molyneux, (née Lady Isabella Stanhope; c. 1748 – 29 January 1819) was a British peeress and society figure.

== Biography ==
Lady Isabella Stanhope was the second child of William Stanhope, 2nd Earl of Harrington and Lady Caroline FitzRoy, a daughter of Charles FitzRoy, 2nd Duke of Grafton. She was an older sister of Charles Stanhope, 3rd Earl of Harrington.

According to the memoirs of Elizabeth Craven, Baroness Craven, Lady Isabella refused the hand of the Duke of Fitz-James.

On 27 November 1768 she married Charles Molyneux, 8th Viscount Molyneux, the future 1st Earl of Sefton in the Peerage of Ireland. On 18 September 1772 Lady Sefton gave birth to a son, the future 2nd Earl of Sefton.

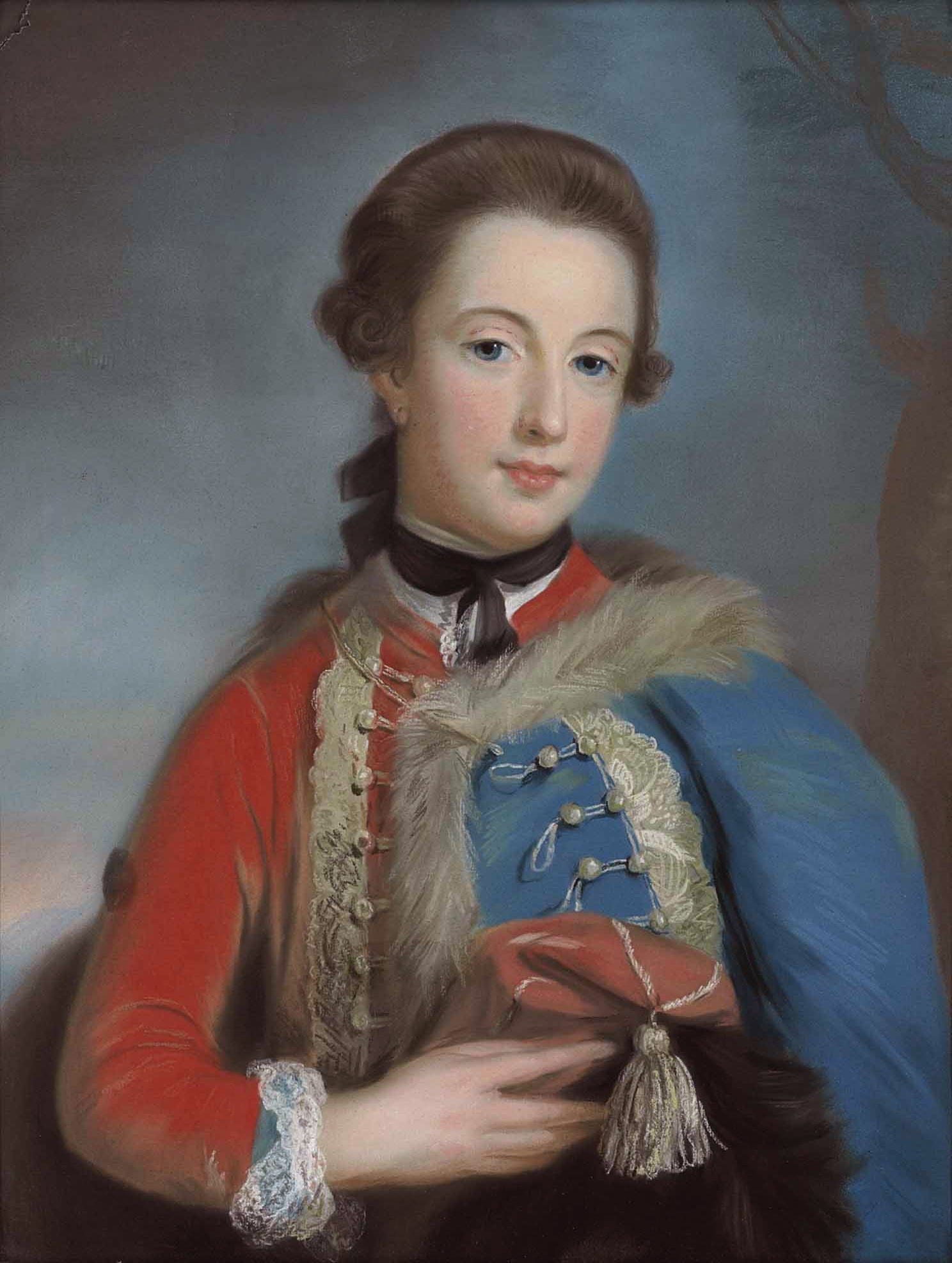
Isabella Stanhope, later Countess of Sefton (1748-1819) (Catherine Read, circa 1768)

She was painted by notable painters including Catherine Read and Thomas Gainsborough, and engraved by the artist James Watson. A portrait of her by Gainsborough was unveiled at the inaugural exhibit of the Royal Academy of Art. A poem written in 1768 by Temple Luttrell, son of Simon Luttrell, 1st Earl of Carhampton, titled Ode to Lady Isabella Stanshope on Her Birthday, was dedicated to her.
