= Hugh Molyneux, 7th Earl of Sefton =

British peer and politician (Irish earldom))

Hugh Molyneux
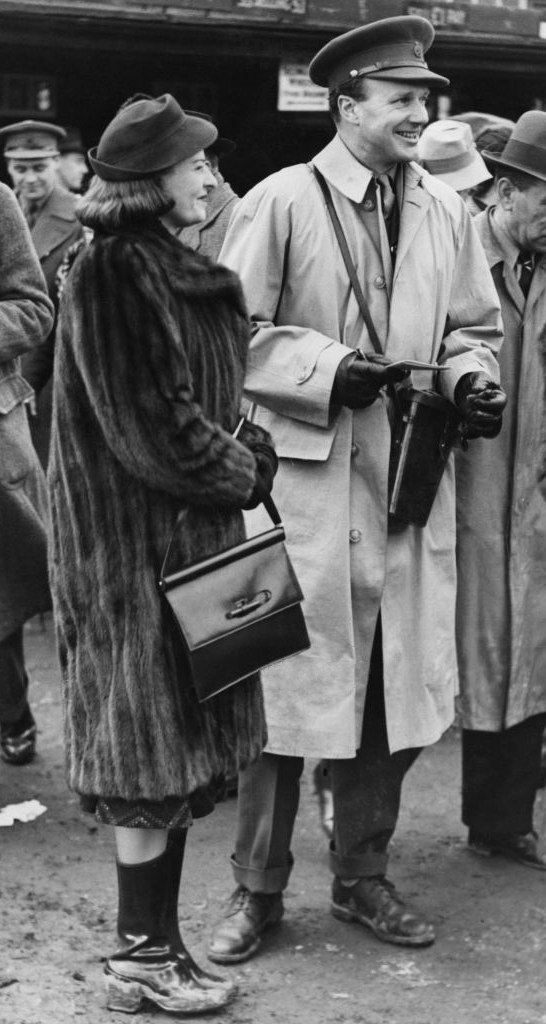
- Hugh Molyneux, 7th Earl of Sefton, with Josephine Armstrong

7th Earl of Sefton

Personal details
- Born: 22 December 1898
- Died: 13 April 1972 (aged 73)

Military service
- Unit: Royal Horse Guards

Hugh William Osbert Molyneux, 7th Earl of Sefton (22 December 1898 – 13 April 1972) was the last Earl of Sefton. His family seats were Croxteth Hall and Abbeystead House in Lancashire; he also held the Wyresdale Forest, an estate in the Forest of Bowland, and Grosvenor Cottage, a property in Culross Street, Mayfair, London.

== Early life ==
Molyneux was the eldest son of Osbert Molyneux, 6th Earl of Sefton. He had a younger brother, Cecil, and a sister Evelyn. He was educated at West Downs School, Harrow School and the Royal Military College, Sandhurst. During the First World War, he served as an officer in the Royal Horse Guards in France and Belgium.

After pursuing a military career, he was appointed aide-de-camp to the Governor General of Canada (1919), to the Viceroy of India, Lord-in-waiting to the King (1936–1937) and Lord Mayor of Liverpool (1944–1945). As a sporting enthusiast, he owned racehorses, including Medoc II (FR) which won the Cheltenham Gold Cup in 1942, St Lucia which won the 1958 Coronation Stakes and Irish Lizard which twice finished third in the Grand National, in 1953 and 1954.

Molyneux was also chairman of the stewards of the British Jockey Club.

== Personal life ==
In 1941, Molyneux married Josephine Gwynne Armstrong, daughter of George Armstrong of Virginia, United States. He was a life-long friend of the Duke of Windsor (he had been a Lord-in-waiting when Edward reigned in 1936) and his wife was a good friend of the Duchess of Windsor.

He was romantically linked at one time to Indira Devi of Cooch Behar. She herself was linked to the Duke of Windsor, and to his brother, Prince George, Duke of Kent.

== Death ==
Molyneux died on 13 April 1972. On his death, the earldom became extinct because he had no living heirs. His 16-year-old brother Cecil had died aboard HMS Lion at the Battle of Jutland in 1916 and his 14-year-old sister a year later. The family seat at Croxteth Hall passed to Liverpool City Council.

On his widow's death in 1980, Abbeystead and the Wyresdale Forest estate were sold to the Duke of Westminster.

== See also ==
- Earl of Sefton Stakes

Peerage of Ireland
Preceded by Osbert Molyneux	Earl of Sefton; 1930–1972	Extinct
