= Molineux =

Molineux may refer to:

- Albert Molineux (1832–1909), South Australian agriculturist
- Edward L. Molineux (1833–1915), American businessman and military officer
- George Molineux (1887–1915), English amateur cricketer
- Michelle Molineux (born 1986), Canadian actress and singer
- Sophie Molineux (born 1998), Australian cricketer
- William Molineux, American, participant in the Boston Tea Party

also

- Molineux Stadium, home of Wolverhampton Wanderers F.C. in Wolverhampton, England
- Molineux, New York State evidence standard, established in People v. Molineux (1901)

== See also ==
- Molyneux (disambiguation)
- Moulineaux, a commune in the Seine-Maritime department in the Normandy region in northern France
- "My Kinsman, Major Molineux", short story by American author Nathaniel Hawthorne
