= Caroline Watson =

British artist

Caroline Watson (1761?–1814) was an English stipple engraver.

== Life ==
The daughter of the Irish engraver James Watson, Watson was born in London in 1760 or 1761, and studied under her father, who worked in mezzotint. She was known for her skilled work in the stipple method, was particularly known for reproductions of miniatures, and was the only woman engraver to serve as an independent engraver in the British 18th century. She came to prominence as an engraver at about the same time as women began to make up a significant proportion print consumers. Due to ill health, her career began to wind down after 1810. She died at Pimlico on 10 June 1814.

== Works ==
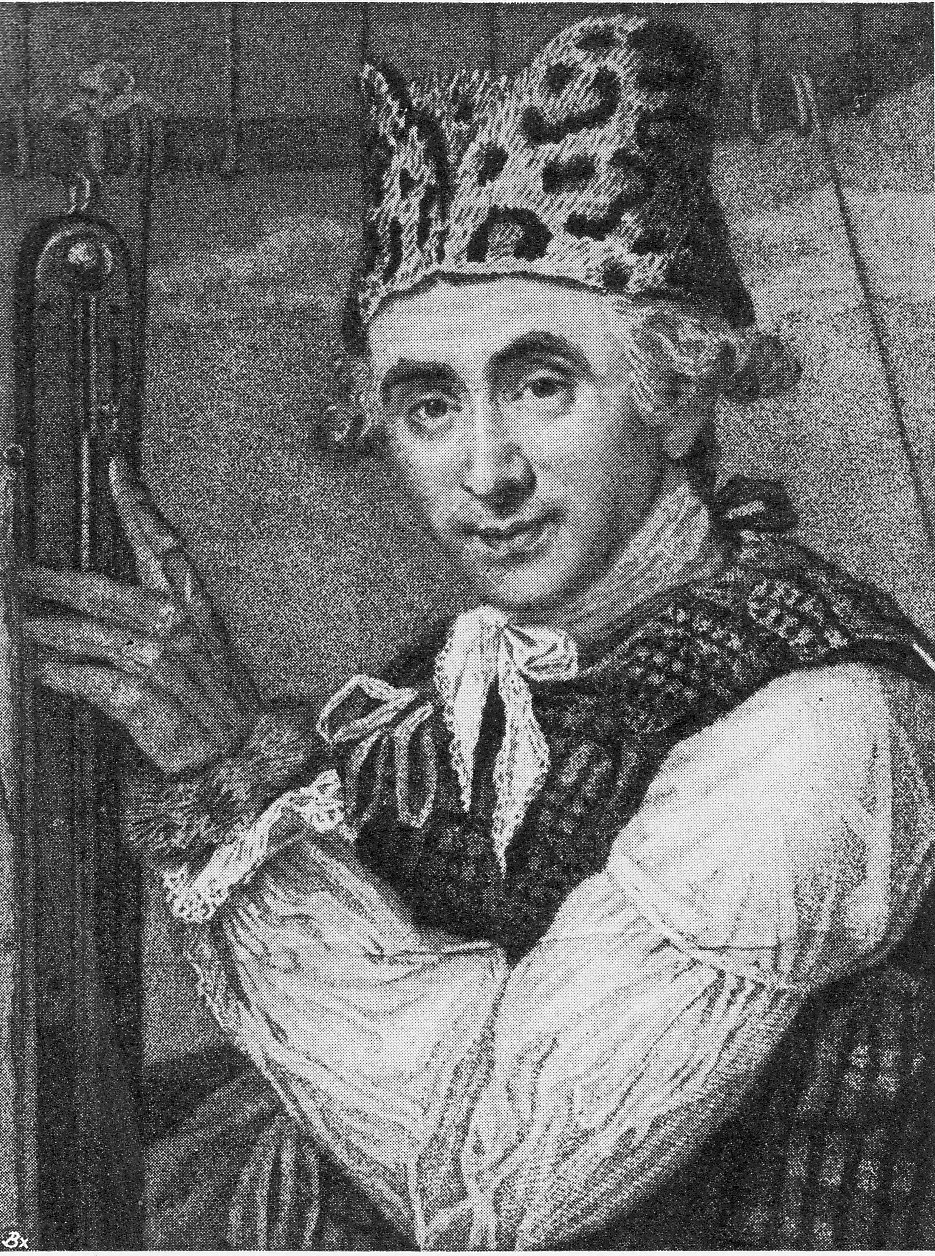
John Jeffries, portrait engraving by Caroline Watson

Watson's plates were numerous. In 1784, she engraved a portrait of Prince William of Gloucester, after Joshua Reynolds, and, in 1785, a pair of small plates of the Princesses Sophia and Mary, after John Hoppner, which she dedicated to Queen Charlotte. She was then appointed engraver to Queen. She engraved portraits of:

- Sir James Harris, and the Hon. Mrs. Stanhope, both after Joshua Reynolds;
- Catherine II of Russia, after Alexander Roslin; and
- William Woollett, after Gilbert Stuart; and
- Samuel Cooper's reputed portrait of John Milton.

Other works were:

- The Marriage of St. Catherine, after Correggio;
- the plates to William Hayley's Life of Romney, for which she replaced William Blake as primary engraver;
- for John Boydell's Shakespeare, the Death of Cardinal Beaufort, after Reynolds, and a scene from The Tempest, after Francis Wheatley.

Watson also executed a set of aquatints of the Progress of Female Virtue and Female Dissipation, from designs by Maria Cosway. She engraved several pictures belonging to the Marquess of Bute.

== Notes ==
Attribution

This article incorporates text from a publication now in the public domain: Lee, Sidney, ed. (1899). "Watson, James (1739?-1790)". Dictionary of National Biography. Vol. 60. London: Smith, Elder & Co.
