= Maria Molyneux, Countess of Sefton =

British noblewoman (1769–1851)

Maria Molyneux, Countess of Sefton (26 April 1769 – 9 March 1851), was the wife of William Molyneux, 2nd Earl of Sefton.

She was one of the seven of children of William Craven, 6th Baron Craven, and his wife, the former Elizabeth Berkeley; her parents separated in 1780 and her mother, a writer, went to live in France.

She married Molyneux, then Viscount Sefton, in 1792, and they had four sons and six daughters:

- Charles William Molyneux, 3rd Earl of Sefton (10 July 1796 – 2 August 1855), who succeeded his father. He married Mary Augusta Gregg-Hopwood and had children.
- Lady Caroline Harriett Molyneux (d. 8 Feb 1866), who married Charles Towneley and had children
- Lady Georgiana Frances Molyneux (d. 28 Jun 1826), who married Charles Pascoe Grenfell and had children
- Maria Molyneux (d. 3 May 1872)
- Louisa Anne Maria Molyneux (d. Jul 1855)
- Frances Charlotte Molyneux
- Katherine Maria Elizabeth Louisa Molyneux (d. 25 Mar 1855)
- Lt.-Col. George Berkeley Molyneux (16 July 1799 – 27 August 1841)
- Lt.-Col. Henry Richard Molyneux (27 August 1800 – 23 May 1841)
- Hon. Francis George Molyneux (5 March 1805 – 24 May 1886), who married Lady Georgiana Jemima Ashburnham and had children

She became well known as one of the Lady Patronesses of Almack's Assembly Rooms in London, a prestigious venue during the Regency era. As such, she was described in the Reminiscences of Captain Gronow as "kind and amiable". The earl was a friend of the Prince Regent (the future King George IV) and it was through the Seftons that Maria Fitzherbert, who was related to the earl, first met the prince in 1784. As a senior patroness of Almack's, the countess was well-placed to help Mrs Fitzherbert gain her entrance into London society.

== Fictional portrayals ==
Maria, Countess of Sefton, features in several of the Regency novels of Georgette Heyer, including Regency Buck and The Grand Sophy.
