= James Watson (engraver) =

Irish engraver (1739–1790)

James Watson (c. 1739 – 1790) was an Irish engraver.

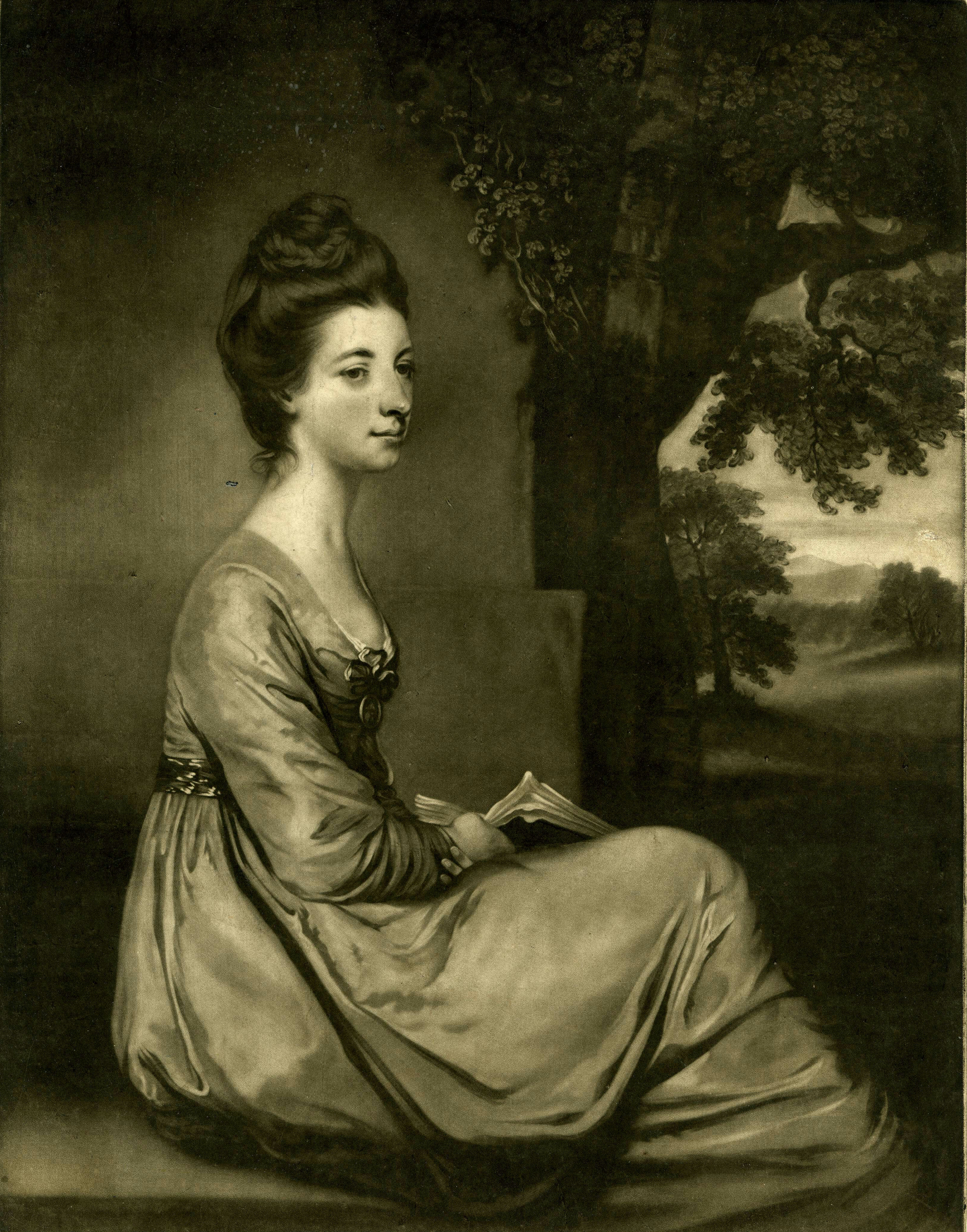
Engraving from 1771 of Jemima, Countess Cornwallis.

== Life ==
He came while young to London, where he is supposed to have been a pupil of James Macardell. He became a leading mezzotint engraver.

Watson published some of his works himself at his house in Little Queen Anne Street, Portland Chapel; but the majority were done for Sayer, Boydell, and other printsellers. He exhibited engravings with the Incorporated Society of Artists between 1762 and 1775.

Watson died in Fitzroy Street, London, on 20 May 1790. The engraver Caroline Watson (1761?–1814) was his daughter and pupil.

== Works ==
Watson produced plates from pictures by Joshua Reynolds, Thomas Gainsborough, Francis Cotes, Catherine Read, Anthony van Dyck, Gabriel Metzu, Godfried Schalcken, Peter Paul Rubens, and others. He engraved about fifty portraits after Reynolds, among them those of the Duchess of Cumberland; the Duchess of Manchester, with her son; Countess Spencer and her daughter; Barbara, Countess of Coventry; Anne Delaval, Lady Isabella Stanhope, and Nelly O'Brien.
