= John Molyneux =

John Molyneux may refer to:

== Politicians ==
- John Molyneux (MP for Nottinghamshire) (died 1588), MP for Nottinghamshire
- John Molyneux (MP for Liverpool), in 1584, MP for Liverpool
- John Molyneux (MP for Wigan), represented Wigan (UK Parliament constituency)

== Others ==
- Sir John Molyneux, 1st Baronet (fl. 1605–1640), High Sheriff of Nottinghamshire
- John Molyneux (footballer) (1931–2018), footballer for Liverpool F.C. in the 1950s
- John Molyneux (Trotskyist) (1948–2022), British Trotskyist, academic and author
- John Molyneux (VC) (1890–1972), recipient of the Victoria Cross
