= George Molineux =

English cricketer

George King Molineux (1887–1915) was an English amateur cricketer who represented Oxford University Cricket Club and the Gentlemen. His career in serious Cricket ended in 1909 once he joined the Army, and he was killed during a German offensive at the Second Battle of Ypres.

== Early life and cricket ==
George King Molineux was the son of Harold Parminter and Rosa Molineux and was born on 15 April 1887 at Eastbourne. He was educated at Winchester College and Magdalen College, Oxford. Molineux was a slow bowler and a lower-order right-handed batsman . He made two appearances for Oxford University in the 1907 season, and the following summer played two matches against his University for the Gentlemen. In his four first-class matches he took 11 first-class wickets at an average of 28. His best bowling was four wickets for 62 for the Gentlemen against Oxford at Easbourne. In this match he also produced his best batting; coming in at number 11 in the Gentlemen's first innings he scored 78 not out and shared a partnership of 128 for the last wicket with HDG Leveson-Gower.

== Army ==
In 1909 Molineux was commissioned into the 2nd Battalion, Northumberland Fusiliers. In 1914 he was appointed an ADC to Lord Hardinge, Viceroy of India, but in November of that year he resigned this position to rejoin his battalion in France. In May, 1915 he was wounded during a German offensive at Frezenberg Ridge on the Ypres Salient. When his battalion was forced to abandon their position and retreat Molineux was lying unconscious in the trench and had to be left behind. There is no known burial for George King Molineux and he is commemorated on panels 8 and 12 of the Menin Gate Memorial, Ypres.
