= Charles Molyneux, 5th Earl of Sefton =

British Earl (1867–1901)

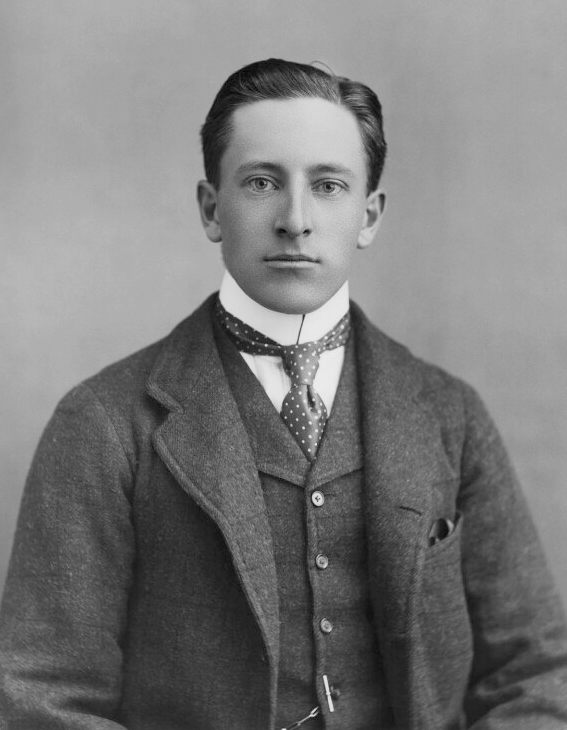
5th Earl of Sefton c. 1893

Charles William Hylton Molyneux, 5th Earl of Sefton, (25 June 1867 – 2 December 1901) was a British peer.

== Biography ==
Molyneux was the eldest son of William Molyneux, 4th Earl of Sefton (1835–1897) by his wife Hon. Cecil Emily Hylton-Jolliffe, daughter of the 1st Baron Hylton. He was known as "Mull" within the family.

He held a commission in the Lancashire Hussars Yeomanry Cavalry, and was ADC to the Lord Lieutenant of Ireland 1889–1892.

Lord Sefton never married. Shortly before succeeding to his titles in 1897, as a fit young man of 30, he suffered a bad fall in the Altcar Steeplechase which left him severely brain damaged, a hopeless invalid and mentally unstable. His engagement to the Lady Mary Heathcote-Drummond-Willoughby, daughter of the 1st Earl of Ancaster was called off and he eventually died from his injuries.

While adaptations were made for him at the family's London townhouse, Sefton House, the 5th Earl eventually died at his family seat, Croxteth Hall, near Liverpool, 2 December 1901, aged only 34, and was buried nearby in St Chad's churchyard, Kirkby. On his death, his title passed to his brother Osbert Molyneux, 6th Earl of Sefton.

Political offices
Peerage of Ireland
Preceded by William Molyneux	Earl of Sefton; 1897–1901	Succeeded by Osbert Molyneux
