= Osbert Molyneux, 6th Earl of Sefton =

British peer (Irish earldom)

The Right Honourable The Earl of Sefton GCVO PC DL
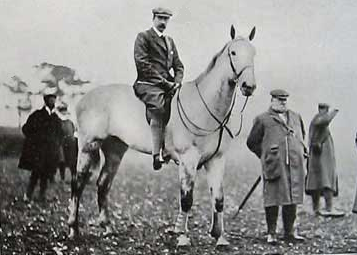
- The Earl of Sefton, photograph from The Bystander, 1905

Master of the Horse
- In office 18 December 1905 – 6 September 1907
- Monarch: Edward VII
- Prime Minister: Sir Henry Campbell-Bannerman
- Preceded by: The Duke of Portland
- Succeeded by: The Earl of Granard

Personal details
- Born: 21 February 1871
- Died: 16 June 1930 (aged 59)
- Party: Liberal
- Spouse: Lady Helena Mary Bridgeman
- Children: 3, including Hugh

Osbert Cecil Molyneux, 6th Earl of Sefton, GCVO, PC, DL (21 February 1871 – 16 June 1930), styled The Honourable Osbert Molyneux until 1901, was a British courtier and Liberal politician. He served as Master of the Horse under Sir Henry Campbell-Bannerman from 1905 to 1907.

== Background ==
Molyneux was the second son of William Molyneux, 4th Earl of Sefton, by his wife the Honourable Cecil Emily Jolliffe (1838–1899), fifth daughter of William Jolliffe, 1st Baron Hylton. He was commissioned a lieutenant in the 2nd Life Guards. Resigning from the regular army, he was appointed a supernumerary captain in the Lancashire Hussars Imperial Yeomanry on 4 June 1902. Molyneux was an active hare courser, chairing the draw for the Waterloo Cup.

== Political career ==
Lord Sefton succeeded to the earldom in December 1901 on the early death of his elder brother, and took his seat in the House of Lords. In April 1902, he was appointed a deputy lieutenant of Lancashire. When the Liberals came to power under Sir Henry Campbell-Bannerman in December 1905, Sefton was appointed Master of the Horse and sworn of the Privy Council in January 1906. He continued as Master of the Horse until September 1907. In 1926 he was appointed a Knight Grand Cross of the Royal Victorian Order.

== Family ==
Lord Sefton married Lady Helena Mary Bridgeman, daughter of George Bridgeman, 4th Earl of Bradford, on 8 January 1898. They had three children:

- Hugh William Osbert Molyneux, 7th Earl of Sefton (1898–1972).
- Midshipman Hon. Cecil Richard Molyneux (1899–1916), killed in action aboard HMS Lion (1910) at the Battle of Jutland during the First World War.
- Lady Evelyn Molyneux (1902–1917), died young.

Lady Helena Sefton was a favourite aunt of Princess Alice, Duchess of Gloucester. The wife of King George V's son Prince Henry, Duke of Gloucester wrote of her aunt Helena: "Long before the First War, she shocked her relations by wearing trousers and going off big-game shooting with a boyfriend--needless to say, it was the trousers that caused the worst scandal. In the last War, she drove lorries, though by then she was well over seventy. She was terrifically given to good works and a very religious person. I was very impressed when she once took me down to the canteen in the docks where she often helped cook breakfast for the merchant seamen who had come in the night before or at break of dawn."

Lord Sefton died in June 1930, aged 59, and was succeeded in the earldom by his eldest and only surviving son, Hugh.

Political offices
Preceded by The Duke of Portland	Master of the Horse; 1905–1907	Succeeded by The Earl of Granard
Peerage of Ireland
Preceded by Charles William Hylton Molyneux	Earl of Sefton; 1901–1930	Succeeded by Hugh William Osbert Molyneux
