= St Helen's Church, Sefton =

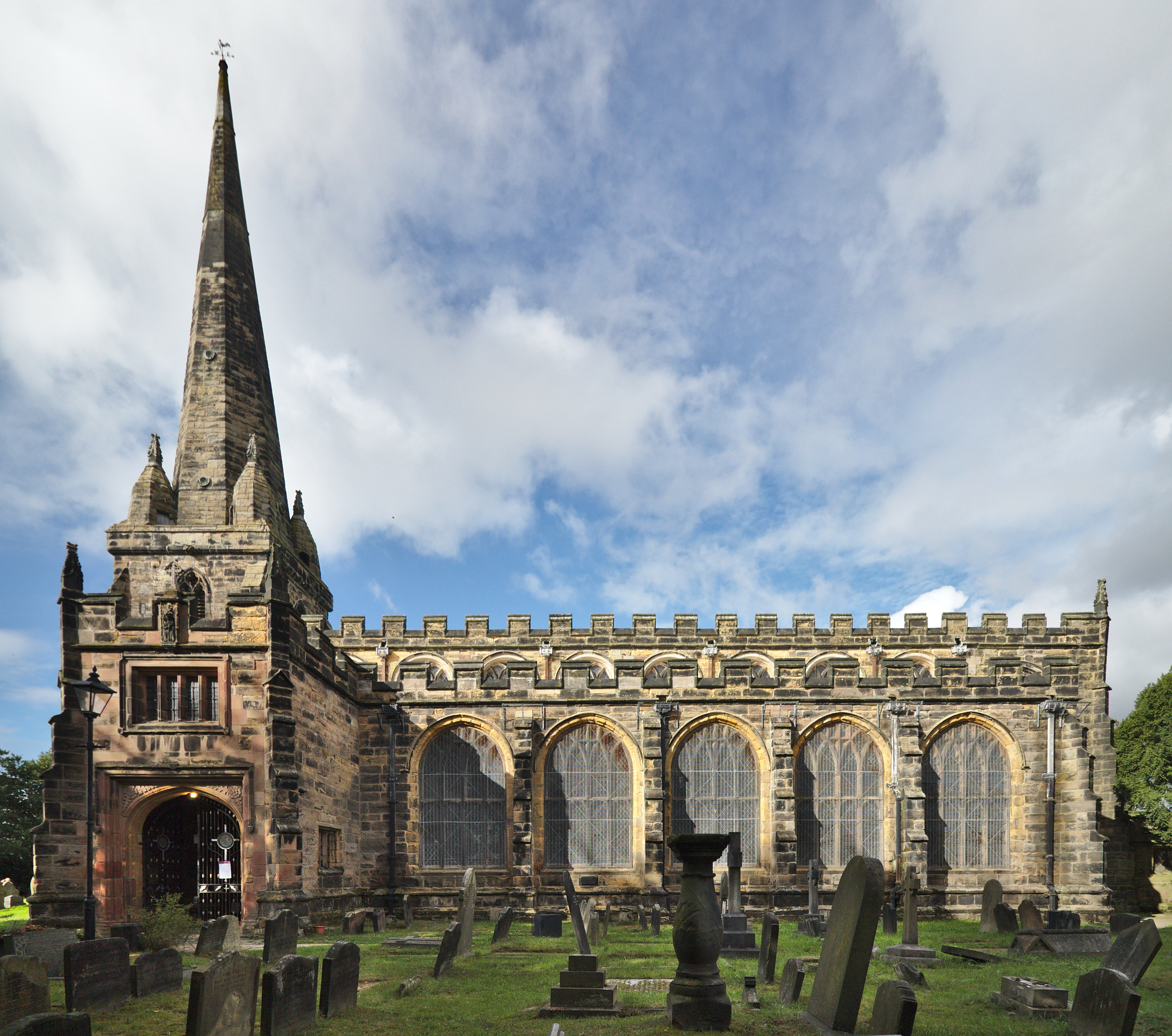
- Sefton Parish Church from the south
- St Helen's Church, Sefton
- 53.5044°N 2.9712°W
- OS grid reference: SD 356 012
- Location: Sefton, Merseyside
- Country: England
- Denomination: Anglican
- Website: www.achurchnearyou.com

History
- Status: Parish church
- Dedication: Saint Helen
- Consecrated: c. 1170

Architecture
- Functional status: Status
- Heritage designation: Grade I
- Designated: 11 October 1968
- Architectural type: Church
- Style: Perpendicular

Administration
- Province: York
- Diocese: Liverpool
- Archdeaconry: Knowsley and Sefton
- Deanery: South Sefton

Clergy
- Priest: Rev Jackie Parry

St. Helen's is a parish church of the Church of England in the village of Sefton, Merseyside, England. It is within the diocese of Liverpool, the archdeaconry of Knowsley and Sefton, and the deanery of Sefton.

A church has stood on the site since the late thirteenth century, but the earliest parts of the current building are the tower and the east bay of the north aisle, which are fourteenth century. The remainder of the building dates principally a rebuilding undertaken between c. 1489 and c. 1587, when three successive members of the Molyneux family held the office of rector. An extensive restoration was undertaken between 1907 and 1922 by W. D. Caröe.

St Helen's is notable for its carved Tudor woodwork, including seven screens which are described in the Buildings of England series as a "gorgeous display" and the "great glory of the church". The church is one of two Grade I listed buildings in the Metropolitan Borough of Sefton, and has been included in Simon Jenkins' book England’s Thousand Best Churches, and Alec Clifton-Taylor's list of "best" English parish churches.

== History ==
=== Consecration ===
The land was first consecrated in 1170, and a private chapel for the Molyneux family built soon after. The history of the land before this is unknown, but the distinctive oval shape of the churchyard suggests that it may have been used as Saxon burial ground in pre-Conquest Britain.

=== Architectural history ===
A small, decorated chapel in the Norman architectural style is known to have existed by 1291, when the building's worth was estimated at £26 19s 4d in the Valor of Pope Nicholas IV. No part of this original chapel exists today, however during building works at the East Window in the early 2000s, substantial Norman floor tiles were discovered and are now displayed in the Lady Chapel.

By 1320, the original building had been completely removed and replaced with a more contemporary Decorated structure, which incorporated a small nave with pointed, geometric tracery windows and pitched roofline. A west steeple with angle buttresses, a cornice and parapet with beehive-shaped pinnacles and distinctive tall spire was also built adjoining it. The spire was partially rebuilt following damage by severe gales in 1802.

Throughout the 14th and 15th centuries, a series of alterations or additions, which may have incorporated a chancel or Lady chapel, seem to have been made to the structure. Evidence of this can be seen in the West window of the north aisle, which is curvilinear in style and shape, and postdates the 14th-century structure.

=== The current church building ===
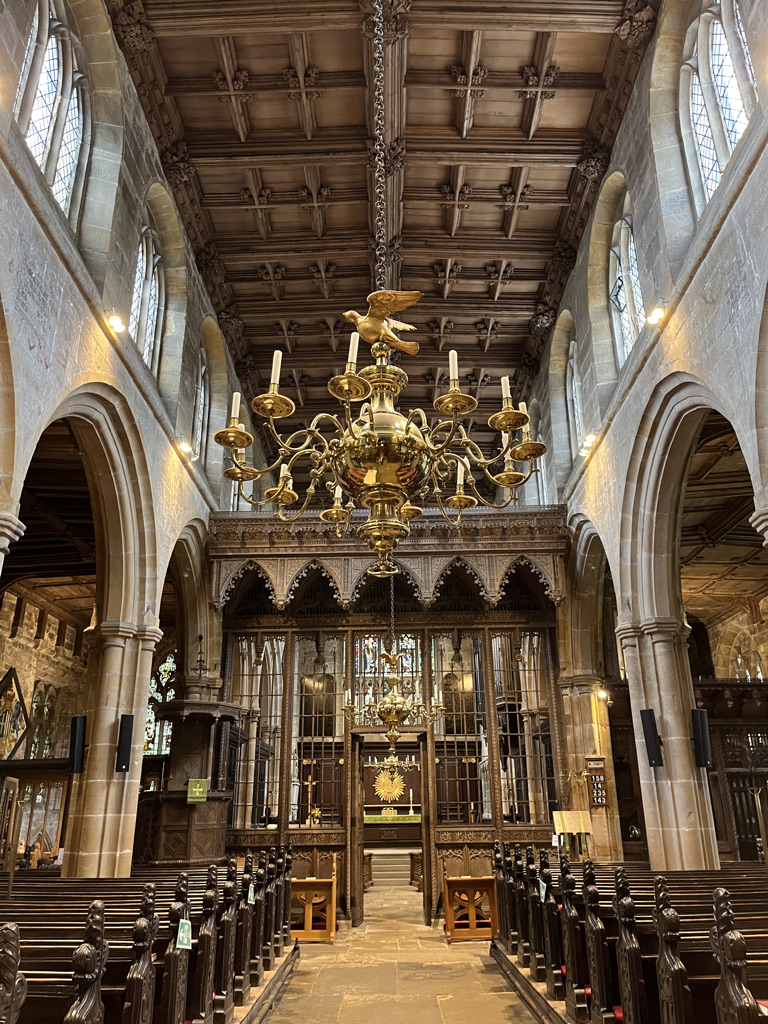
The nave, looking east to the chancel screen

During the reign of King Henry VIII prior to the English Reformation, the church was given an extensive rebuild. The 14th-century tower was retained, but everything else was removed and a traditional Tudor church in the Perpendicular style was built. This incorporated a new nave and chancel with a clerestory, side aisles and chapels to the north and south, a two-storey porch to the south and small vestry to the east. The north chapel is the Lady Chapel, and the south chapel, now known as the Molyneux Chapel, was once the Chantry of St Mary.

The vast majority of the church as seen from the south elevation is of new stone dating from this rebuild in the 1530s. However, the east bay of the north aisle uses stonework dating from the 14th century, and the west bay from the 15th century, suggesting that much of the masonry of the earlier structure was incorporated into the new Tudor building. The smaller windows, rough joint with the tower, lack of embattled parapets, and large sections of arch mouldings which make up the North wall all suggest that this was the case. Within the chancel, a 15th-century sedilia and piscina in a four-arch arcade, and an ogee-arched aumbry are located to the South of the altar and predate the current structure.

Some time in the late 16th century, a range of typically Elizabethan, rectilinear windows in the late Perpendicular style were installed along the south aisle, flooding the church interior with light. They are plain but contain fragments of pre-Reformation glass set into leaded panels.

== Decoration ==
=== Tudor and Jacobean ===
The most striking aspect of the church's interior is the complex of seven screens dating to the early to mid 16th century, when the current church was built. They are described by Pollard and Pevsner as the church's "great glory" with the chancel screen forming "the magnificent centrepiece of the whole church". They are richly carved with Gothic and Renaissance motifs, the latter including friezes with putti.

The oak stalls in the chancel and twenty six rows of pews lining the nave were carved especially for Sefton, and date to around 1590; all have finials in the poppyhead style. The choir stalls are carved with animals, heraldic devices, and, the initials "JM" for James Molyneux. The nave pews are carved with motifs including the letters of the alphabet (except "W", "X", and "Z"), flowers and fruit, and the instruments of the Passion.

The pulpit is Jacobean and dates to 1635. It retains its backplate and sounding-board, and is richly covered in intricately carved Arabesque decoration.

A large, 14th-century muniment chest, four hatchments to the Blundell family and a series of carved wooden pews are located in the north and south chapels.

The octagonal baptismal font which is 15th-century and out of place in the West end of the church, lacks its original painted decoration but has received a plain wooden cover dated 1688. Oak boards painted in gold leaf displaying the Ten Commandments and Apostles' Creed hang in the tower and date to a similar period. These would have originally hung on the East wall behind the altar.

The communion rail, with twisted balusters, dates from between 1690 and 1700.

=== Georgian ===
During the 18th century, when the Neo Classical architectural style was fashionable in Britain, a series of alterations were made to the church's interior. Those that survive today are the characteristically Georgian austere, dark-wood panelling, complete with a relief pillar design highlighted in gold, which replaced the 17th-century Creed and Commandment boards behind the altar. The area around the south door received a markedly 18th-century wooden vestibule, and above the 14th-century north door, a white marble epitaph was added. The church also received three 12-armed golden chandeliers in 1773. The addition which has since been removed was a set of raised wooden galleries in the side aisles, which were added to increase capacity in the church. Their installation will have prompted the moving of the font from its orthodox standing place at the South door to the rather unconventional site it now occupies in front of the tower. The walls of the church were whitewashed at some point during this era.

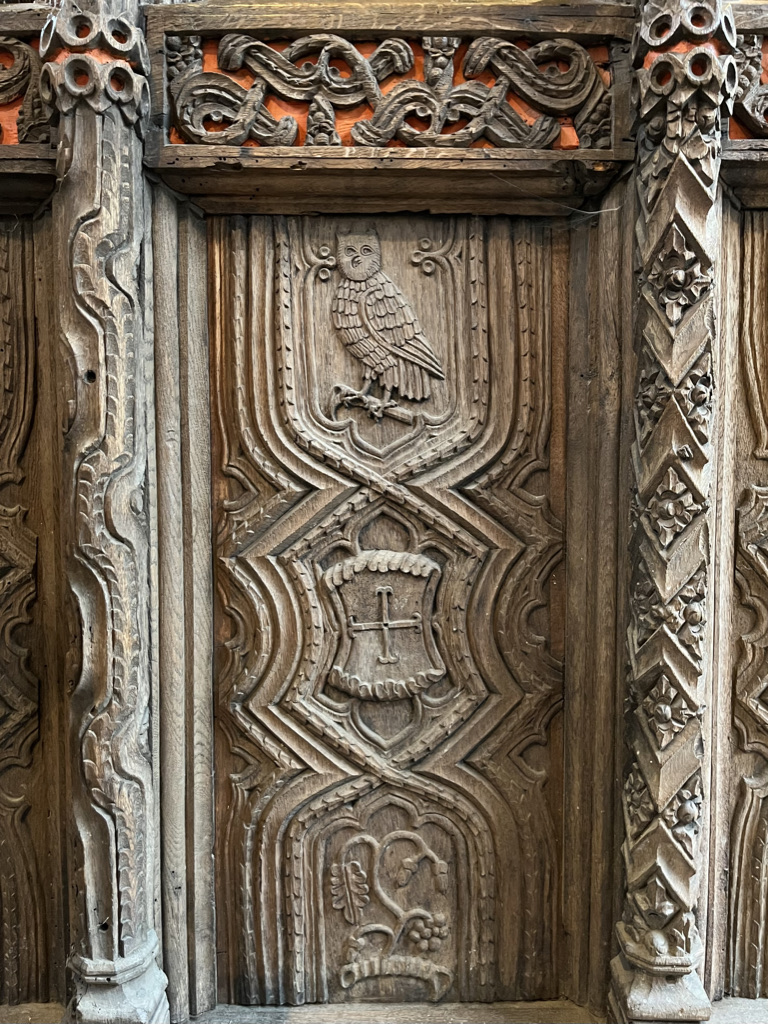
Detail of the Molyneux chapel screen

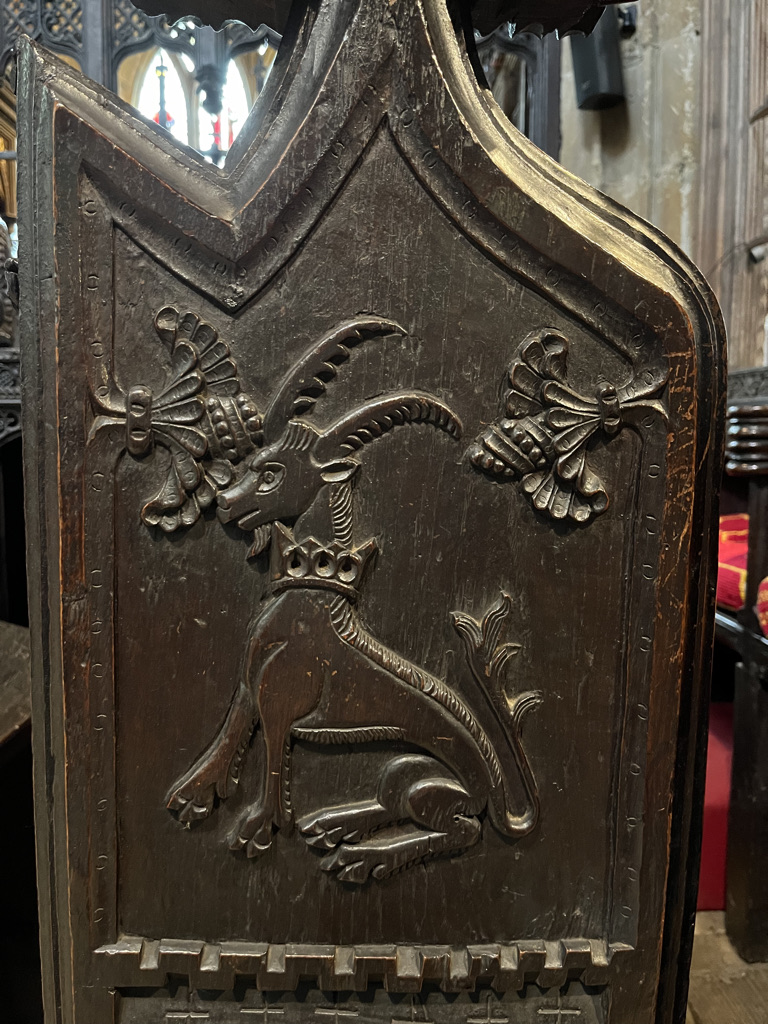
Detail of a choir stall

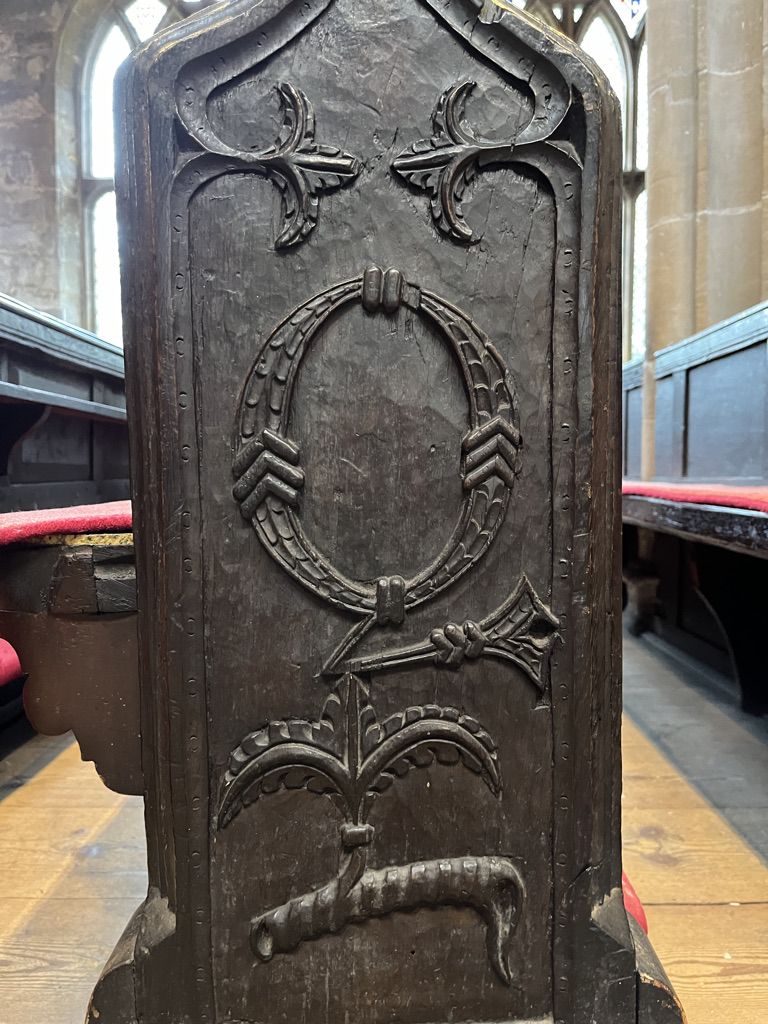
Nave pew end carved with the letter 'Q'

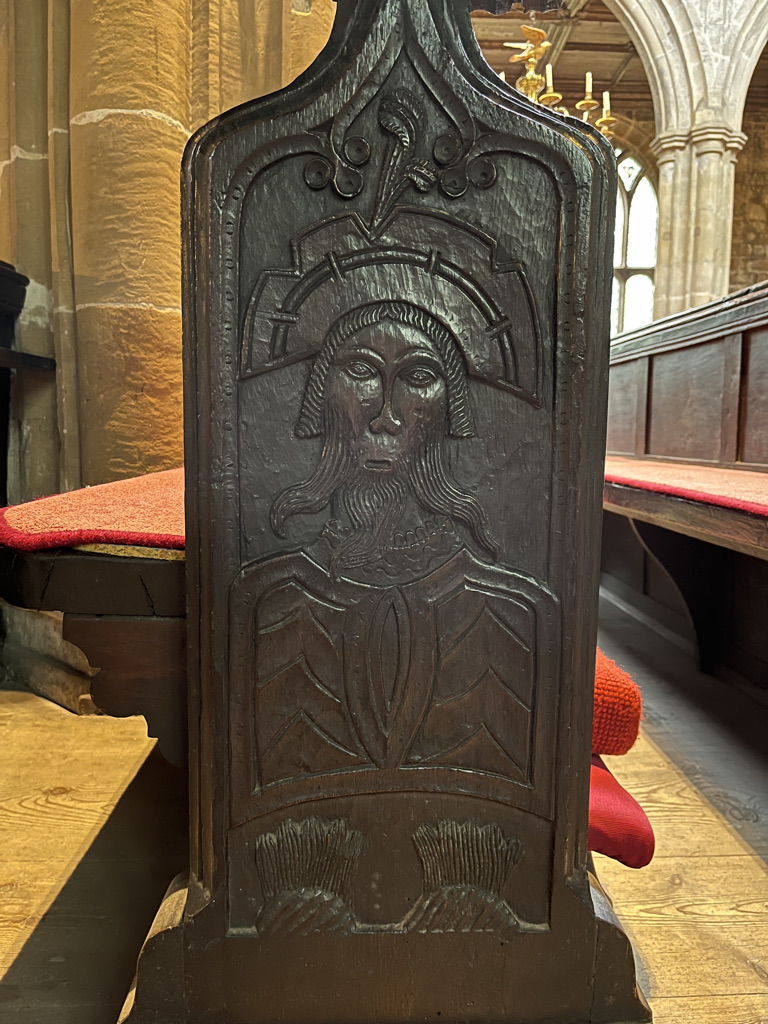
Nave pew end carved with a bearded figure

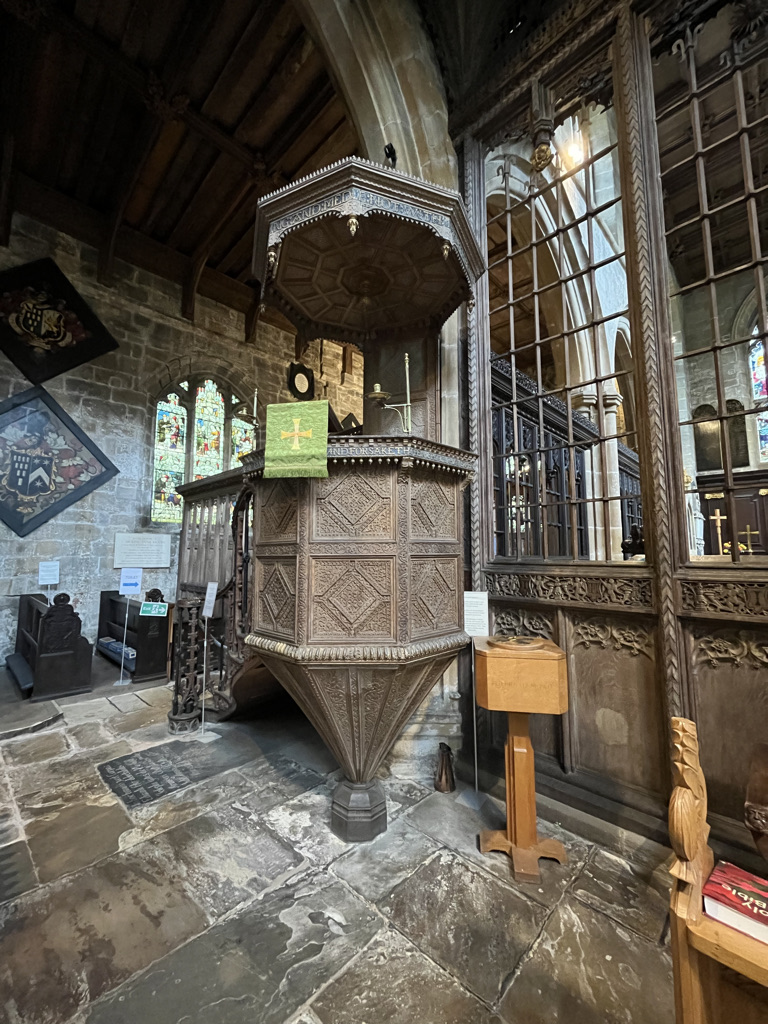
The Jacobean pulpit

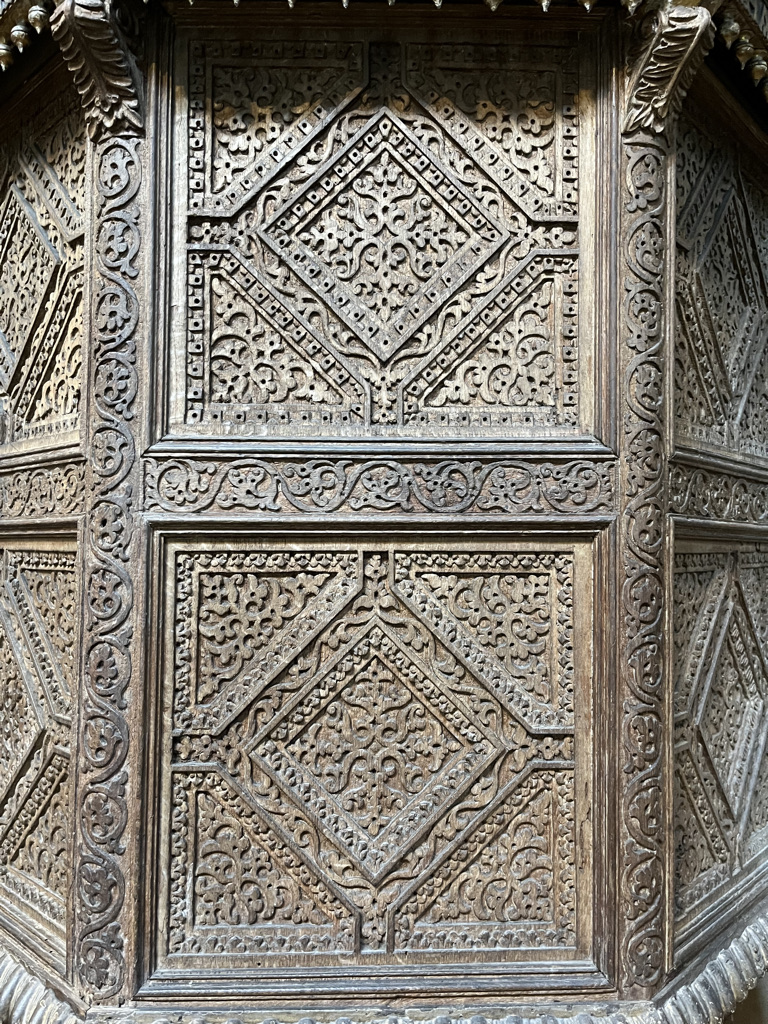
Detail of the pulpit

== Restoration ==
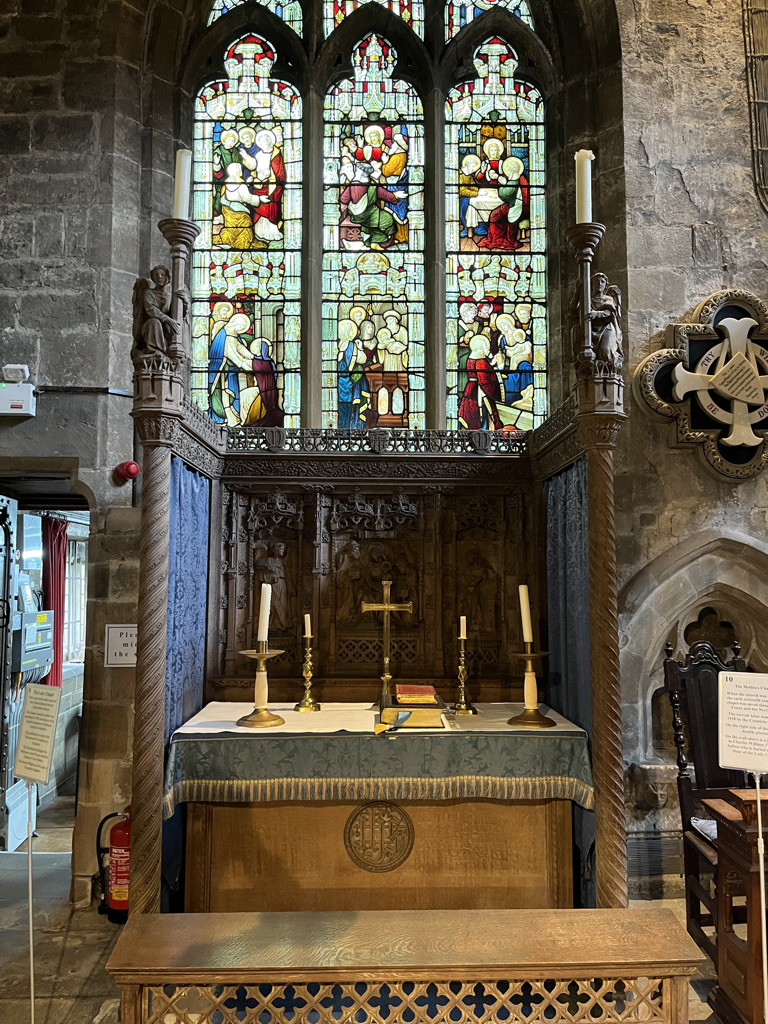
The Lady chapel altar, by Caroë

Following the Victorian Gothic Revival movement of the 1830s, St Helen's was extensively restored during the late 19th and early 20th centuries, taking the appearance of the church back to a pre-Reformation style.

=== Victorian Era ===
Work began in the late 19th century and was completed in 1901. The most significant changes were the removal of the Georgian galleries and whitewashing, but by far the most striking was the addition of the carved wooden ceiling in the nave and side aisles. Taken from an original 16th-century piece of ceiling in the porch, it stretches down the length of the church. From 1875 onwards, a series of stained glass windows were added. The organ was installed in 1893 and built by Hill & Son. It was modified in 1922 by Harrison & Harrison, in 1968 by Rushworth and Dreaper and in 2007 by Henry Willis & Sons.
Several images of the Madonna and Child were installed and private altars were reinstated in the side chapels adjacent to the main chancel.

=== The 20th century ===
Between 1907 and 1922, W. D. Caroe extensively restored the screens and designed the pews lining the side aisles. These replaced family box pews from the 18th century, of which only two were retained at the West end of the North aisle. A choir vestry was added in the form of a small single-storey annex to the North-East of the church in 1915, which was further extended to provide kitchen facilities and access to the main vestry in 1990. Central heating was installed throughout the building.

== Windows ==
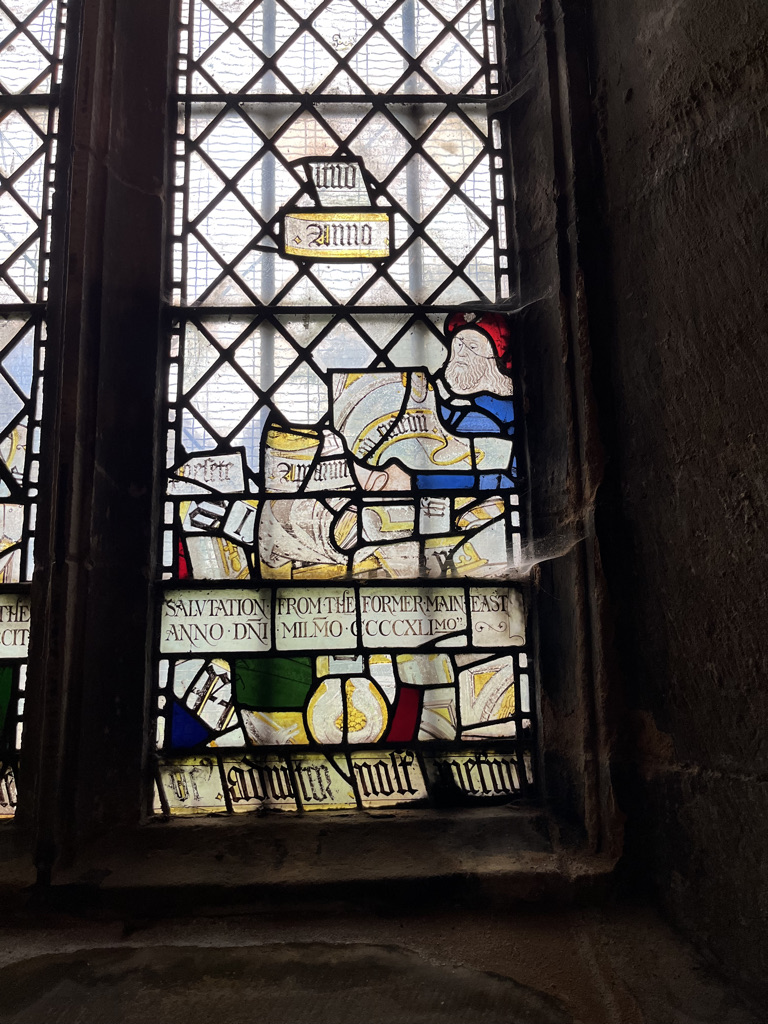
Fragments of medieval glass in the south aisle, first window from the east

Although there are some fragments of stained glass from the 16th century, most of the present windows date from the late 19th century. The East window is by Clayton and Bell and was installed in 1875, a window in the south aisle dates from 1864 and is by Henry Holiday; those in the South Chapel are from 1936, and by H. G. Hiller; and a window in the north aisle dated 1927 is by Walter Wilkinson.

== Bells ==
Sefton is an affiliated to the Lancashire Association of Change Ringers' Liverpool branch. The size and shape of the tower at Sefton suggests that it contained at least one bell soon after it was built. No records to confirm this exists however. The earliest pair of bells at the tower were cast Henri Oldfield and installed in 1588 during the final throes of the Spanish Armada. Another pair from Oldfield were installed in 1601, followed by a further pair of lighter bells from William Dobson's foundry in 1815, completing a ring of six. Sefton's final pair of bells, a treble and second from John Taylor & Co, were added in 1945 following Victory in Europe. The bells have recently been fully restored in 2023.

Bell ringing practice is every Wednesday evening at 7.30pm.

== Churchyard ==
In the churchyard are three structures which are listed at Grade II. These are the base of a cross which is probably medieval, a sundial probably dating from the 18th century, and the churchyard wall. The churchyard also contains the war graves of sixteen service personnel, ten of World War I and six of World War II.

== Notable parishioners ==
Among those buried at Sefton are the ancestors of the Blundell family of Little Crosby, and the Molyneux family of Sefton and Croxteth, who both have their own side chapel at Sefton. The Rothwells of Ormskirk, responsible for much of the redecoration of the Victorian period, are also buried here.

Of the Molyneux family, Sir Richard (d.1290) and Sir William Molyneux (d.1320), knights of the Crusades, are entombed within the church, and are its oldest inhabitants. Their effigies now lie beneath an arch moulding set into the wall in the Molyneux chapel, which is outside of the 14th-century church walls.

Of the Blundell family, squires at Little Crosby since the 11th century, the 17th- and early 18th-century diarist, Nicholas Blundell is entombed in the Blundell family crypt, beneath the Blundell chapel.

In the churchyard, John Saddler, father of Transfer Printing is buried.

== In Literature ==
An engraving of the interior, showing a bridal couple, in Fisher's Drawing Room Scrap Book, 1834 is accompanied by a skit by Letitia Elizabeth Landon on the folly of marriage.

== Visiting Sefton ==
The Church is open for visitors every Monday morning from 9.30am until 12.30pm and Heritage Days in September. Please see www.achurchnearyou.com for more details.

== See also ==
- Grade I listed buildings in Merseyside
- Grade I listed churches in Merseyside
- Listed buildings in Sefton, Merseyside
