= Molyneux baronets of Castle Dillon (1730) =

Escutcheon of the Molyneux baronets of Castle Dillon

The Molyneux baronetcy, of Castle Dillon, County Armagh, was created in the Baronetage of Ireland on 4 July 1730 for Thomas Molyneux, an Irish physician. He became a Fellow of the Royal Society in 1686.

== Molyneux baronets of Castle Dillon, County Armagh (1730) ==
- Sir Thomas Molyneux, 1st Baronet (1661–1733)
- Sir Daniel Molyneux, 2nd Baronet (1708–1738)
- Sir Capel Molyneux, 3rd Baronet, PC (1717–1797)
- Sir Capel Molyneux, 4th Baronet (1750–1832)
- Sir Thomas Molyneux, 5th Baronet (1767–1841)
- Sir George King Adlercron Molyneux, 6th Baronet (1813–1848)
- Sir Capel Molyneux, 7th Baronet (1841–1879)
- Sir John William Henry Molyneux, 8th Baronet (1819–1879)
- Sir John Charles Molyneux, 9th Baronet (1843–1928)
- Sir Ernest Molyneux, 10th Baronet (1865–1940)

The title became extinct on the 10th baronet's death in 1940.

== Notes ==
Baronetage of Ireland
| Preceded by Haman baronets | Molyneux baronets of Castle Dillon; 4 July 1730 | Succeeded by Bayly baronets |
