= William Molyneux, 2nd Earl of Sefton =

British Earl (1772–1838)

The Earl of Sefton
- 2nd Earl of Sefton
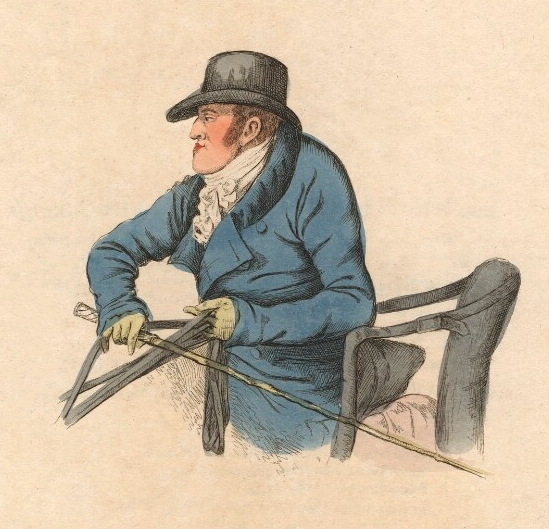
- William Philip Molyneux, 2nd Earl of Sefton by Robert Dighton
- Tenure: 1795–1838
- Predecessor: 1st Earl of Sefton
- Successor: Charles William Molyneux, 3rd Earl of Sefton
- Other titles: Baron Sefton of Croxteth (1831)
- Known for: Founding the Waterloo Cup; co-establishing Aintree Racecourse; member of Four-In-Hand Driving Club
- Born: William Philip Molyneux; 18 September 1772; England
- Died: 20 November 1838 (aged 66); London, England
- Buried: Croxteth Hall, Liverpool
- Residence: Croxteth Hall; Stoke Farm, Berkshire; 21 Arlington Street, London
- Spouse: Maria Craven
- Issue: Four sons, six daughters
- Heir: Charles William Molyneux, 3rd Earl of Sefton
- Parents: Charles Molyneux, 1st Earl of Sefton and Isabella Stanhope
- Occupation: Politician, sportsman, clubman

William Philip Molyneux, 2nd Earl of Sefton (18 September 1772 – 20 November 1838), also known as Lord Dashalong, was a sportsman, gambler and a friend of the Prince Regent.

== Personal life ==
Born in 1772, Lord Sefton was the only son of Charles Molyneux, 1st Earl of Sefton and Lady Isabella Stanhope, daughter of the Earl of Harrington. In 1792, he married the Hon Maria Craven, daughter of William Craven, 6th Baron Craven. He had four sons and six daughters. He succeeded to the title in 1795 and it passed in turn on his death in 1838 to his eldest son Charles William Molyneux, 3rd Earl of Sefton.

Charles Greville wrote of him:

"He was absolutely devoid of religious belief or opinions, but he left to all others the unquestioned liberty of rendering that homage to religion from which he gave himself a plenary dispensation. His general conduct was stained with no gross immorality, and as he was placed far above the necessity of committing dishonourable actions, his mind was habitually imbued with principles of integrity. They sat, however, lightly and easily upon him as regarded the conduct of others, not so much from indifference as from indulgence in those particular cases where a rigid and severe application of high principle would have interfered with his own convenience or enjoyment."

== Political career ==
Educated at Eton College and at the University of Oxford, despite an unsuccessful attempt to be MP for Liverpool in 1818, he sat as MP for Droitwich, Worcs between 1816 and 1831. Sefton opposed the surveyance of the Liverpool and Manchester Railway line, in 1824 and did his utmost to prevent it. Ultimately, he was not successful in preventing the railway's construction in 1830.

On 20 June 1831, he was created Baron Sefton of Croxteth in the Peerage of the United Kingdom which allowed him to sit in the House of Lords. He also accepted the Stewardship of the manor of East Hundred, in the county of Berkshire.

== Sporting life ==
Sefton was a gambler and sportsman who founded and governance of sports events.

He was the third man to be appointed Master of The Quorn (1800–1805). In 1836, he founded the Waterloo Cup for coursing at Great Altcar in Lancashire. The last Waterloo Cup took place in 2005. Over the years, Aintree had been the site of private races between the Molyneux family and their friends, including the Stanleys. Lord Sefton leased land at Aintree to the Waterloo Hotel (a hotel in Liverpool's Ranelagh Street) to help establish what is now Aintree Racecourse, home of the Grand National Steeplechase, of which he was one of the principal sponsors and a committee member.

In London, he acquired the nickname 'Lord Dashalong' because of his fondness for racing through the streets in a carriage with four horses; along with Lord Worcester, Lord Barrymore, Sir John Lade, Colonel Berkeley and Charles Buxton, Lord Sefton was a founding member of the Four-in-Hand (also known as Four-Horse) Club.

He was a member of White's club in London. His wife, Lady Molyneux, was a Patroness of Almack's club, of which his mother had been a Foundress; she is a minor character in several novels of Georgette Heyer.

His ancestral seat was Croxteth Hall in Liverpool. He also resided at Stoke Farm, Berkshire and at 21 Arlington Street, London.

Parliament of the United Kingdom
Preceded by Sir Thomas Winnington	Member of Parliament for Droitwich; 1816–1831	Succeeded by Sir Thomas Winnington
Peerage of Ireland
Preceded by Charles Molyneux	Earl of Sefton; 1795–1838	Succeeded by Charles Molyneux
Peerage of the United Kingdom
New creation	Baron Sefton; 1831–1838	Succeeded by Charles Molyneux
