= William Molyneux, 4th Earl of Sefton =

British peer (Irish earldom)

Coordinates: 53.9848°N 2.6615°W

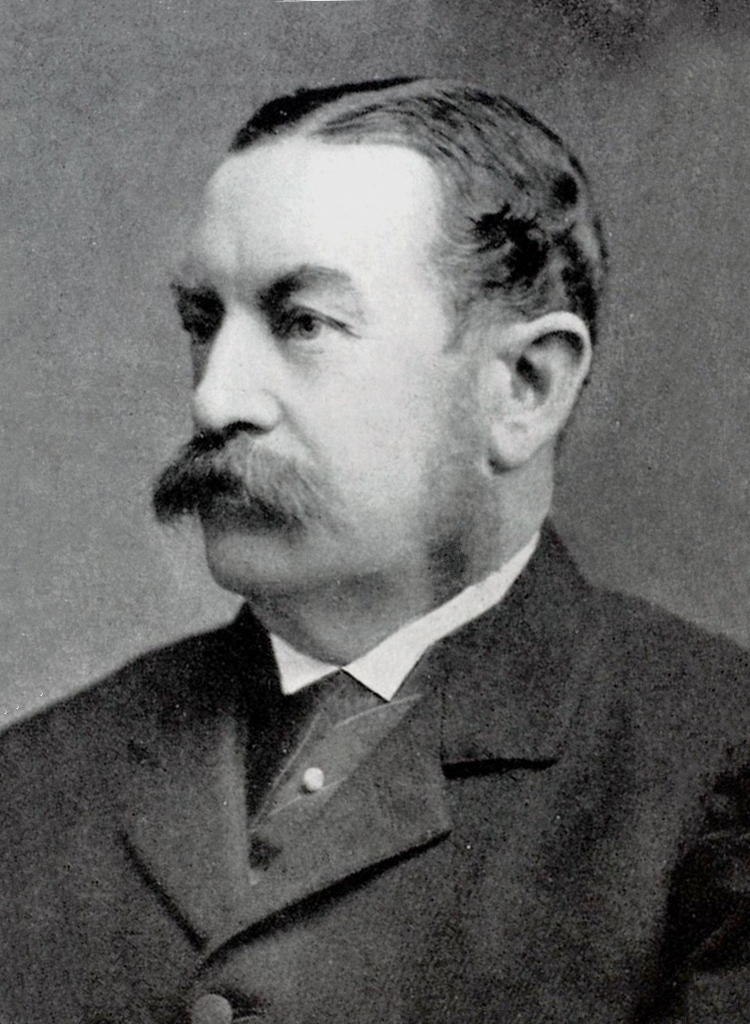
William Molyneux c. 1860

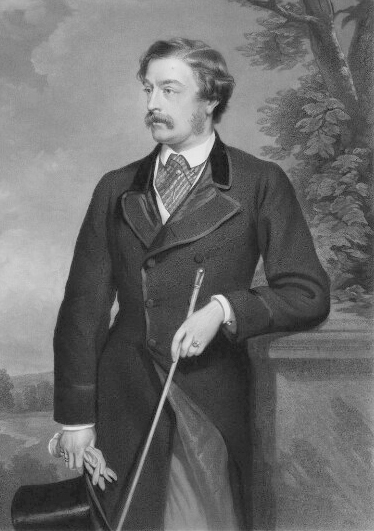
William Molyneux

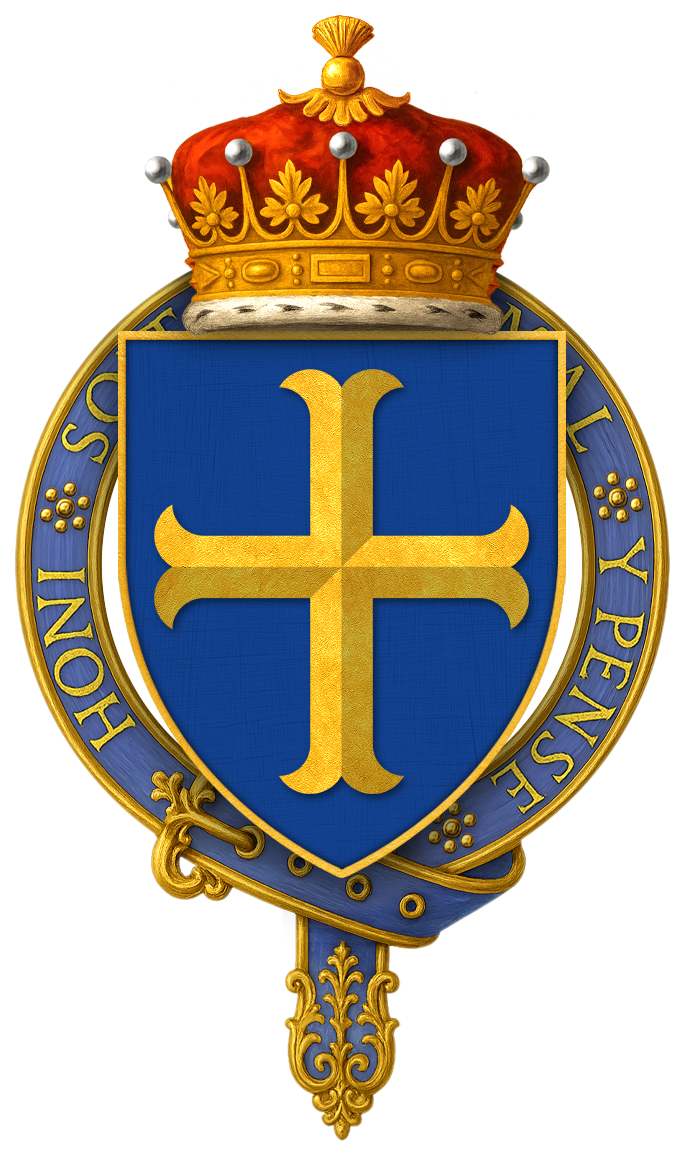
Garter-encircled arms of William Molyneux, 4th Earl of Sefton, KG

William Philip Molyneux, 4th Earl of Sefton, KG (14 October 1835 – 27 June 1897) was a British peer.

== Biography ==
Born Viscount Molyneux, he was the eldest son of Charles Molyneux, 3rd Earl of Sefton and his wife, Mary. He was educated at Eton College, Berks. In 1854, Molyneux became an ensign in the Grenadier Guards and inherited his father's earldom the following year. He was promoted to captain in 1857, retiring a year later, when he was appointed Lord Lieutenant of Lancashire.

On 18 July 1866, Lord Sefton married Hon. Cecil Emily Jolliffe (1838–1899), the fifth daughter of William Jolliffe, 1st Baron Hylton. They had five children:

- Charles William Hylton, styled Viscount Molyneux (1867–1901), later 5th Earl of Sefton.
- Lady Gertrude Eleanor (1868–1937)
- Lady Rose Mary (c.1870–1905) died unmarried.
- Hon. Osbert Cecil (1871–1930), later 6th Earl of Sefton.
- Hon. Richard Frederick (1873–1954) died unmarried.

Lord Sefton was appointed a Knight of the Garter in 1885. In 1886, he built Abbeystead House in the forest of Wyresdale, Lancashire as a 'private shooting lodge on a grand scale'. On his death in 1897, his titles passed to his eldest son, Charles.

The family seats were : Croxteth Hall, Lancs; Abbeystead House, Lancs; Sefton House, Belgravia Sq., London

== Sources ==
- Cokayne et al., The Complete Peerage

Honorary titles
Preceded by The Duke of Devonshire	Lord Lieutenant of Lancashire; 1858–1897	Succeeded by The Earl of Derby
Peerage of Ireland
Preceded by Charles Molyneux	Earl of Sefton; 1855–1897	Succeeded by Charles Molyneux
