= William Molyneux, 7th Viscount Molyneux =

Irish peer and Jesuit priest

William Molyneux, 7th Viscount Molyneux (1685 – 30 March 1759) was a Jesuit priest and member of the peerage of Ireland.

== Biography ==
He was the third of four sons of William Molyneux, 4th Viscount Molyneux. Following the death of their father in 1717 the title was initially held by the eldest brother, Richard, until he died without a male heir in 1738. It then passed to the second son, Caryll, who also died in 1745 leaving the title to William.

As a priest in charge of a Catholic mission at Scholes near Prescot, he handed control of the estates to his younger brother Thomas on the grounds that he was "old and had no intention to marry". However following Thomas' death in 1756 he was ordered to "cease parish duty and appear in his own rank".

He died on 30 March 1759 and the title passed to Thomas' son, Charles.

=== Alternative accounts ===
Some accounts state that the title passed from Caryll (6th Viscount) to Caryll's eldest son Richard (born 1709), who was actually the priest (and 7th Viscount), and from him to his younger brother William (1711-1758) (and thus 8th Viscount) and finally to Charles William (and thus 9th Viscount), son of Caryll's youngest son Thomas (1713-1756). Other accounts state that the 7th viscount was Richard (born c1700) the son of Richard (5th viscount) and who was a Catholic priest in New England for a time as head of the Jesuits there and that the title then passed to William, also a Catholic priest.

However, Farrer and Brownbill's A History of the County of Lancaster written in 1907 explains that the second Richard never existed and was a duplication of the earlier Richard in the ordinary pedigrees. It also clarifies that Caryll was the brother of Richard, William and Thomas.

Peerage of Ireland
Preceded by Caryll Molyneux	Viscount Molyneux; 1745–1759	Succeeded by Charles Molyneux
