= John Molyneux (VC) =

English Victoria Cross recipient (1890–1972)

- Born: 22 November 1890; St Helens, Lancashire
- Died: 25 March 1972 (aged 81); St Helens
- Military career
- Allegiance: United Kingdom
- Branch: British Army
- Service years: 1914 - 1918
- Rank: Sergeant
- Units: The Royal Fusiliers
- Conflicts: World War I
- Awards: Victoria Cross; Croix de Guerre (Belgium)

John Molyneux VC (22 November 1890 – 25 March 1972) was an English recipient of the Victoria Cross, the highest and most prestigious award for gallantry in the face of the enemy that can be awarded to British and Commonwealth forces.

== Early life ==
John Molyneux was born on 22 November 1890 to mother Minnie Jane and coal miner father, Joseph, who worked as a hewer at Sherdley Colliery. Young John, who was always known as Jack, was educated at Holy Trinity school in Parr. He left school at twelve to work in the mines.

== Details ==
He was 26 years old, and a sergeant in the 2nd Battalion, The Royal Fusiliers, British Army during the First World War when the following deed took place for which he was awarded the VC.

On 9 October 1917 east of Langemarck, Belgium, during an attack which was held up by machine-gun fire and causing many casualties, Sergeant Molyneux organised a bombing party to clear the trench in front of a house. Many of the enemy were killed and a machine-gun captured. The sergeant then called for someone to follow him and rushed for the house. By the time the extra men arrived he was in the thick of a hand-to-hand fight which only lasted a short time and the enemy surrendered. In addition to the dead and wounded between 20 or 30 prisoners were taken.

He also won the Croix de Guerre (Belgium).

== The medal ==
His Victoria Cross is displayed at the Royal Fusiliers Museum, Tower of London, England.
