= Charles Molyneux, 1st Earl of Sefton =

British politician (1748–1795)

Charles William Molyneux

Member of Parliament for Lancashire
- In office 1771–1774
- Preceded by: Lord Archibald Hamilton and Lord Strange
- Succeeded by: Sir Thomas Egerton and Lord Stanley

Personal details
- Born: 11 October 1748
- Died: 31 January 1795 (aged 46)
- Party: Whig
- Spouse: Lady Isabella Stanhope
- Children: William

Charles William Molyneux, 1st Earl of Sefton (11 October 1748 – 31 January 1795) was a Member of the British Parliament and a member of the peerage of Ireland.

He was born on 11 October 1748, the son of Thomas and Mary (née Leverly) Molyneux. Thomas died on 3 September 1756, leaving him the heir to the title 8th Viscount Molyneux, which he inherited at the age of 10 on 30 March 1759 following the death of his uncle, William Molyneux, 7th Viscount Molyneux. He married Lady Isabella Stanhope, daughter of William Stanhope, 2nd Earl of Harrington, on 27 November 1768. He conformed to the Church of England on 5 March 1769, for which he was rewarded the title Earl of Sefton on 30 November 1771 with which the viscountcy was merged. He was elected to the House of Commons in 1771 and represented the Lancashire constituency as a Whig until 1774.

He died in either late December 1794 or January 1795 and was succeeded by his only son, William.

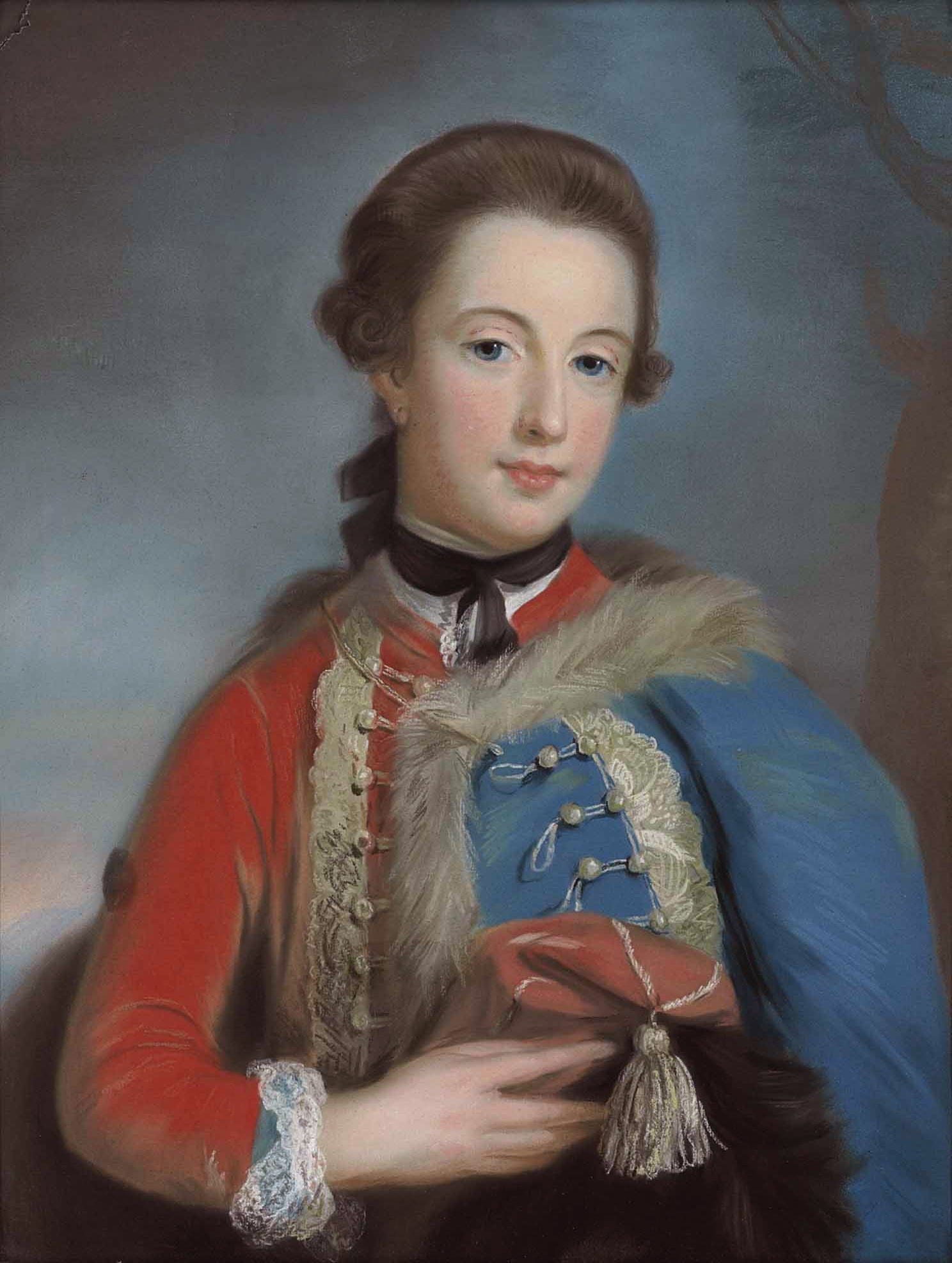
Lady Isabella Stanhope, later Countess of Sefton (1748–1819) (Catherine Read, circa 1768)

He was uncle of Maria Fitzherbert, royal mistress (and secret wife) of King George IV.

Parliament of Great Britain
Preceded by Lord Archibald Hamilton and Lord Strange	Member of Parliament for Lancashire (with Lord Archibald Hamilton, to 1772; Sir Thomas Egerton, from 1772); 1771–1774	Succeeded by Sir Thomas Egerton and Lord Stanley
Peerage of Ireland
New creation	Earl of Sefton; 1771–1795	Succeeded by William Molyneux
Preceded by William Molyneux	Viscount Molyneux; 1759–1795	Succeeded by William Molyneux
