= Croxteth Hall =

Country house and estate in Liverpool, England

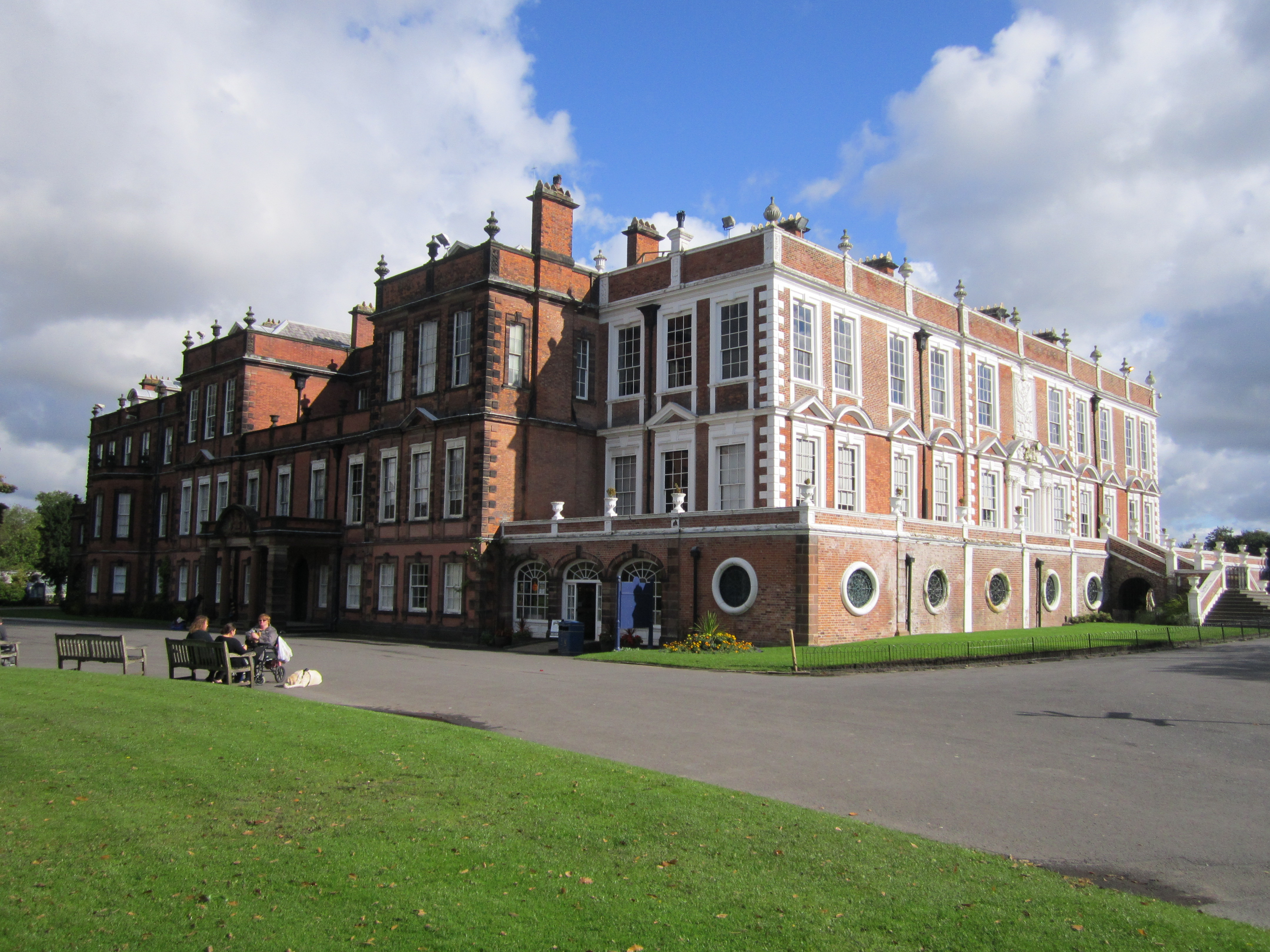
- Croxteth Hall in 2012

General information
- Location: West Derby, Liverpool, England
- Coordinates: 53°26′31″N 2°53′28″W
- Year built: c. 1575 (southern end of east range)
- Renovated: c. 1702, 1874–77 and 1902 (extended)

Design and construction
- Designations

Listed Building – Grade II*
- Official name: Croxteth Hall
- Designated: 28 June 1952
- Reference no.: 1280299

Croxteth Hall is a country estate and Grade II* listed building in the West Derby suburb of Liverpool, England. It is the former country estate and ancestral home of the Molyneux family, the Earls of Sefton. After the death of the seventh and last Earl in 1972, the estate passed to Liverpool City Council, which now manages the remainder of the estate following the sale of approximately half of the grounds. The remaining grounds, Croxteth Park, were at one time a hunting chase of the Molyneux family and are now open to the public.

== History ==
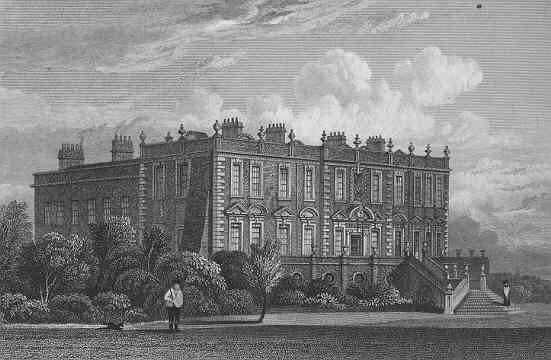
The hall in the 1820s

The original house was built in about 1575, and has been expanded in several stages in Tudor, Georgian, and Queen Anne styles. The principal front, the west façade, was built in 1702. During this period, a bakery and a brewery were built though during the Victorian era these were demolished. In 1874 a wing was added for visitors to the hall to stay in.

Queen Victoria, Prince Albert, and their children stayed at Croxteth Hall on 9 October 1851 before visiting Liverpool the following day during torrential rain. However, the visit started fine with 700 members of the local gentry being entertained in the hall grounds.

The hall and its outbuilding are a Grade II* listed building, as are three of the outbuildings; another 15 buildings on the estate are Grade II. The Molyneux family lived at the hall from the 16th century until 1972, when the last Earl died. His American-born widow Josephine, Countess of Sefton (1903–1980)—once a close friend of the Duchess of Windsor and nicknamed "Foxy" for her abundant auburn hair—continued to spend some time at Croxteth. She became the last member of the Molyneux family to reside in the hall.

When the last Earl died in 1972, a worldwide search was made for an heir to the title but without success. Much of the original estate has since been sold off for development, but approximately 500 acres (2.0 km^{2}) remain as a country park, which is open to the public and includes various play facilities for children. The estate also contains the historic hall itself, open to the public for a small fee, as well as a maintained Victorian walled garden and a working country farm.

The walled garden is home to what remains of the Liverpool Botanics. This is one of the oldest horticultural collections in Britain, founded by William Roscoe in 1802. Amongst the tropical plants is the National Collection of Dracaena (dragon trees); there are orchids and the National Collection of Codiaeum; pelargoniums and the National Collection of Solenostemon (coleus) as well as a rich collection of bromeliads. Liverpool was once world-famous for its orchids as the collection is composed mainly of wild collected species rather than the more usual garden hybrids.

In March 2013, it was announced that a £400,000 programme would be undertaken to restore the damaged Queen Anne wing which was gutted by fire in 1952.

Liverpool City Council announced in 2017 that they were looking for bids from developers to manage the hall and park with the facility costing the council over £1 million a year to run. By January 2018, two bids had been submitted to run the hall and park, one of which planned to use the facility as a luxury hotel, spa and wedding venue. However, by March 2018 the council announced plans to run the facility itself, aiming to develop it into a tourist attraction, hosting concerts, fairs and markets.

The hall had to have urgent structural work undertaken during the summer of 2020 when an engineering report discovered that repairs were needed to chimney breasts, guttering and roof linings, costing around £650,000.

== Future ==
Liverpool City Council announced a public consultation in August 2022 as to how the park and hall could be used and generate more revenue. The public were invited to give their views on a number of ideas, including the creation of a pet crematorium, paid parking and the types of events they would like to see held there.

== The park ==
The park is listed at Grade II, and is a country park. It also contains Mull Wood, which is part of the 85-hectare (210-acre) Croxteth Local Nature Reserve. In partnership with Lancashire Wildlife Trust, the reserve was doubled in size. This allows people better access to the reserve areas and include new habitats within the reserve. One of the improvements to Mull Wood is the sowing of a Wildflower Meadow, situated near the Old Kennels.

Myerscough College operate their Liverpool campus from part of the hall, at which they teach 350 full-time students. See Myerscough College Liverpool Homepage

The "Friends of Croxteth Hall and Country Park" support the work of Liverpool's major stately home. The Friends hold a variety of fun events to raise funds. Among the things they have paid for are benches, plants, equipment, and horticultural studies.

Each Saturday at 9 a.m. the park hosts a free, weekly, timed 5 km parkrun event starting and finishing at the hall.

== Kennels ==
The kennels in Croxteth Hall Lane were built in the 1870s and are a Grade II listed building. They were designed by the Chester architect John Douglas for the 4th Earl of Sefton. The kennels are built in red brick with a patterned roof of blue and green slates. The building is in one storey and has three bays; the left two bays consist of the kennels and the bay on the right is higher with a steeper half-hipped roof. There is a tall brick chimney stack. The kennels are currently occupied and maintained by the Croxteth Park Volunteer Group (founded 2017).

== See also ==
- Grade II* listed buildings in Liverpool – Suburbs
- Grade II* listed buildings in Merseyside
- Featured in the Most Haunted TV show.
