= Earl of Sefton =

British aristocratic title

Earldom of Sefton
- Canting arms of Molyneux: Azure, a cross moline or
- Creation date: 30 November 1771
- Created by: George III
- Peerage: Peerage of Ireland
- First holder: Charles Molyneux, 8th Viscount Molyneux
- Last holder: Hugh Molyneux, 7th Earl of Sefton
- Subsidiary titles: Viscount Molyneux; Baron Sefton
- Status: Extinct
- Extinction date: 13 April 1972
- Former seats: Croxteth Hall; Abbeystead House; Woolton Hall
- Motto: Vivere sat vincere ("To live is sufficient victory” or “To conquer is to live enough")

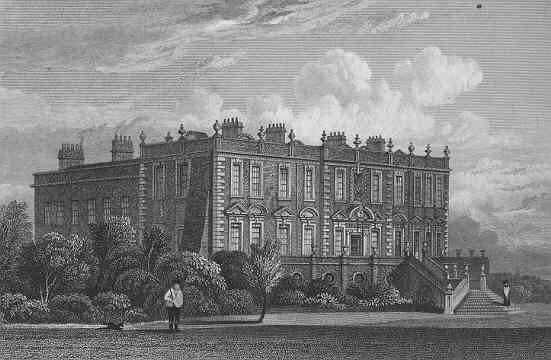
Croxteth Hall, ancestral home of the Earls of Sefton

Earl of Sefton was a title in the Peerage of Ireland created in 1771 for the 8th Viscount Molyneux. The Earls of Sefton held the subsidiary titles Viscount Molyneux, of Maryborough (modern day Portlaoise) in the Queen's County (created 1628), in the Peerage of Ireland, and (from the 2nd Earl onwards) Baron Sefton, of Croxteth in the County Palatine of Lancaster (created 1831), in the Peerage of the United Kingdom. All three titles became extinct upon the death of the 7th Earl in 1972.

The Molyneux family's powerful allegiances led to an acquisition of lands and wealth throughout the period 1100–1700, when members of the family were lords of the manor at Sefton. The seat of the Earls of Sefton was Croxteth Hall near (now in) Liverpool. It was bequeathed to the City of Liverpool by the 7th and last Earl of Sefton and his wife, the former Josephine Gwynne Armstrong (1903–1980), who was the final member of the Molyneux family to live at Croxteth. The American-born Countess of Sefton, nicknamed "Foxy" and formerly a fashion model of great beauty, was a lifelong friend of the Duchess of Windsor.

Another seat of the Earls of Sefton was the Abbeystead estate in Lancashire, later owned by the Dukes of Westminster. Abbeystead was mainly used as a hunting and recreational estate by the Earls of Sefton.

Despite being part of the Peerage of Ireland, the earldom referred to Sefton in Lancashire.

== Molyneux family history ==
The ancestors of the Molyneaux family who arrived in England around 1100 bore the name "de Molines". They came from Moulins, France, in the region of Auvergne-Rhône-Alpes. Other sources claim the family came from Molineaux-sur-Seine, in Normandy. There is a 'William de Moulins' from Falaise, in Normandy, as mentioned here: ' Fulbert of Falaise '. This William likely grew up alongside William the Conqueror as his cousin and friend, and may have been granted lands by the Conqueror. It is possible "Moulins" referred to a Guild (of millers) in France, rather than the place name.

Wherever their origin, Robert de Moulins' son, William, settled in Lancashire. They were granted lands in Lancashire. They can be shown to have held a large moated manor and St. Helen's Church at Sefton without interruption from about 1100 to 1700 before they moved to Croxteth Hall. Of the Molyneux family, Sir Richard (d.1290) and Sir William Molyneux (d.1320), knights of the Crusades, are entombed within the church, and are its oldest inhabitants. Their effigies now lie beneath an arch moulding set into the wall in the Molyneux chapel, which is outside of the 14th-century church walls. The family were hereditary constables of Liverpool Castle.

The senior branch of the family had been staunch Catholics and Royalists (notably in the 17th and 18th centuries) through the worst times until Charles Molyneux, 8th Viscount Molyneux, was rewarded for converting to the Protestant faith. The relatively youthful second and third Viscounts fought on the Royalist side both politically and militarily. Although Liverpool Castle had been partly dismantled in 1660-1678, Caryll Molyneux, the 3rd Viscount, had used it for storing arms. During the reign of King James II, he was outlawed by Parliament for supporting the deposed king from 1688 to 1689. Control of the Castle finally passed out of Molyneux's hands after Caryll had again been suspected of participation in a Jacobite plot. William, the 7th Viscount, was a Jesuit, and there were in his time not less than seven Molyneux in the Society of Jesus.

The loss of Liverpool Castle led to a protracted legal case over its ownership and ultimately its demolition. On 5 March 1704 the city's burgesses obtained a lease for the castle and its site from The Crown for fifty years. But William Molyneux, 4th Viscount Molyneux, disputed this as he still claimed to be the castle's hereditary constables. This delayed the settlement of the lease until 1726, when the final ruins of the castle were demolished.

Over the centuries, several deviations of the name Molyneaux have emerged. As the English language changed and incorporated elements of other European languages such as Norman French and Latin, even literate people regularly changed the spelling of their names. Scribes and monks in the Middle Ages spelt names as they sounded, so it is common to find several variations that refer to a single person. The variations of the name include Molyneaux, Molinex, Mullinix, Mullenneix, Mullineaux, Molinieux, Molinaux, Molineaux, Mollineaux, Molineux, and several others. Later, many variations were due to misspellings in American or other country's immigration services. Although Anglo-Norman surnames like Molyneaux are characterized by many spelling variations, the form Molyneux has prevailed with the modern trend towards standardisation.

== Molyneux baronets, of Sefton (1611) ==
- Sir Richard Molyneux, 1st Baronet (1560–1622) Member of Parliament for Lancashire
- Sir Richard Molyneux, 2nd Baronet (1594–1636) (created Viscount Molyneux in 1628)

== Viscounts Molyneux (1628) ==
- Richard Molyneux, 1st Viscount Molyneux (1594–1636)
- Richard Molyneux, 2nd Viscount Molyneux (1620?–1654)
- Caryll Molyneux, 3rd Viscount Molyneux (1622–1699)
- William Molyneux, 4th Viscount Molyneux (1655–1717)
- Richard Molyneux, 5th Viscount Molyneux (1679–1738)
- Caryll Molyneux, 6th Viscount Molyneux (1683–1745)
- William Molyneux, 7th Viscount Molyneux (1685–1759)
- Charles William Molyneux, 8th Viscount Molyneux (1748–1794) (created Earl of Sefton on 30 November 1771)

== Earls of Sefton (1771) ==
- Charles William Molyneux, 1st Earl of Sefton (1748–1794)
- William Philip Molyneux, 2nd Earl of Sefton (1772–1838) (created Baron Sefton on 20 June 1831)
- Charles William Molyneux, 3rd Earl of Sefton (1796–1855)
- William Philip Molyneux, 4th Earl of Sefton (1835–1897)
- Charles William Hylton Molyneux, 5th Earl of Sefton (1867–1901)
- Osbert Cecil Molyneux, 6th Earl of Sefton (1871–1930)
- Hugh William Osbert Molyneux, 7th Earl of Sefton (1898–1972)

== See also ==
- Molyneux baronets of Teversal Manor
- Molyneux of Castle Dillon, County Armagh
