= Molyneux baronets =

Set index for Molyneux baronets

There have been three baronetcies created for members of the Molyneux Norman family. All are now extinct.

- Molyneux baronets of Sefton (1611)
- Molyneux baronets of Teversall (1611)
- Molyneux baronets of Castle Dillon (1730)
