= 1877 Salford by-election =

UK Parliamentary by-election

The 1877 Salford by-election was fought on 19 April 1877. The by-election was fought due to the death of the incumbent Conservative MP, Charles Edward Cawley. It was won by the Conservative candidate Oliver Ormerod Walker.

1877 Salford by-election (1 seat)
Party	Candidate	Votes	%	±%
Conservative	Oliver Ormerod Walker	8,642	50.8	N/A
Liberal	Joseph Kay	8,372	49.2	N/A
Majority		270	1.6	+1.0
Turnout		17,014	77.2	+5.4
Registered electors		22,041		
Conservative hold		Swing	0.0	
