= Salford (constituency) =

UK Parliament constituency (1832–1885, 1997–2010, 2024 onwards)

- Borough constituency for the House of Commons
- Interactive map of boundaries since 2024
- Location within North West England
- County: Greater Manchester
- Electorate: 72,169 (March 2020)

Current constituency
- Created: 2024
- Member of Parliament: Rebecca Long-Bailey (Labour)
- Seats: One
- Created from: Salford and Eccles

1997–2010
- Type of constituency: Borough constituency
- Created from: Salford East, Eccles

1832–1885
- Created from: Lancashire
- Replaced by: Salford North, Salford South and Salford West

Salford is a borough constituency in Greater Manchester represented in the House of Commons of the Parliament of the United Kingdom. It elects one Member of Parliament (MP) by the first past the post system of election. The constituency was re-established for the 2024 general election and is represented by Rebecca Long-Bailey of the Labour Party. Long-Bailey was MP for the predecessor seat of Salford and Eccles from 2015 to 2024.

== Constituency profile ==
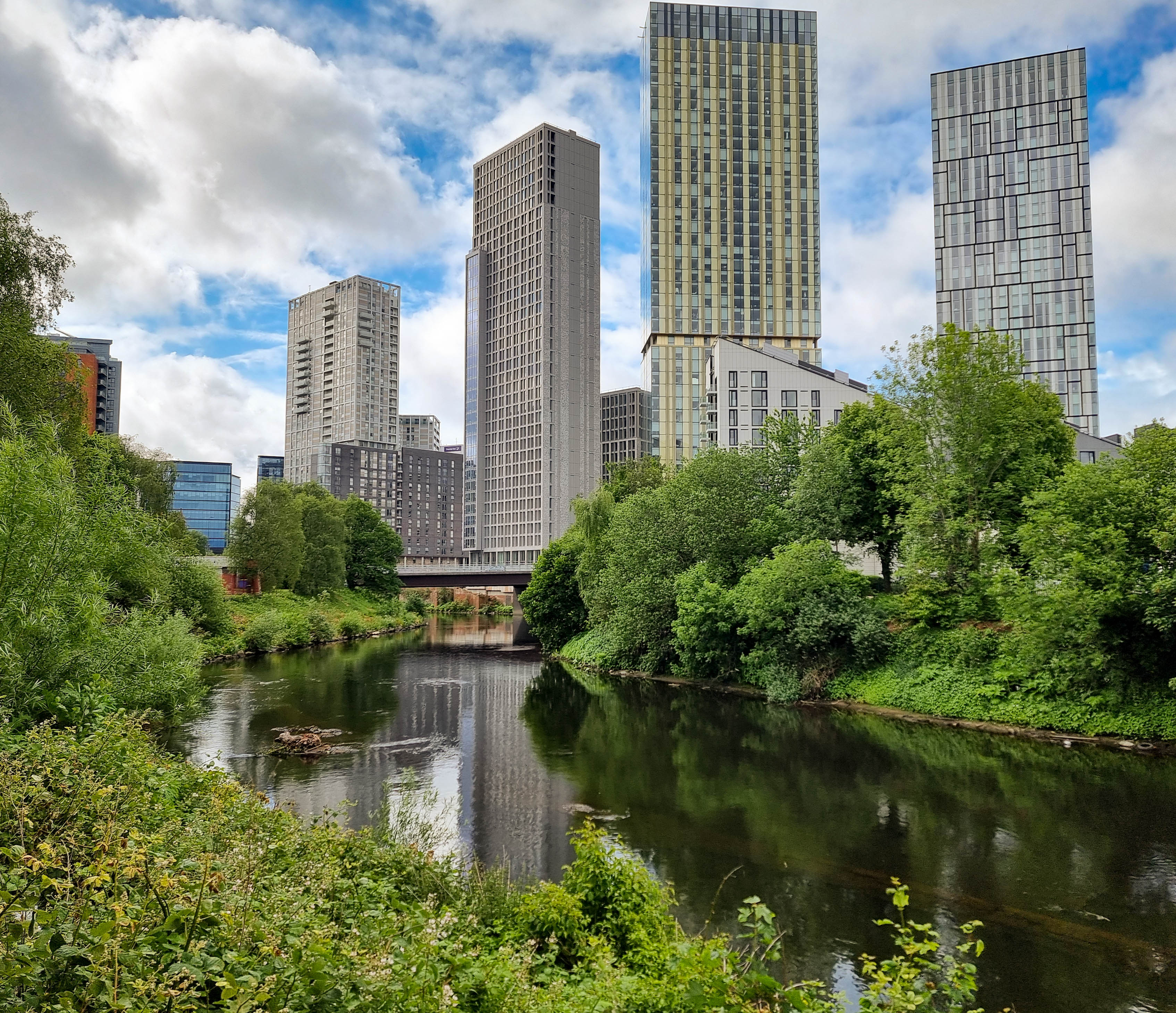
Salford and the River Irwell

Salford is a constituency in Greater Manchester in North West England. It covers the central and northern areas of the city of Salford, including the neighbourhoods of Ordsall, Weaste, Seedley, Little Bolton, Irlams o' th' Height, Pendlebury, Clifton, parts of Swinton, Pendleton, Broughton and Blackfriars.

An economically diverse area that has seen much regeneration over the past 25 years through slum clearance and flagship developments such as MediaCityUK, home of BBC and ITV in the north, and The Lowry at Salford Quays, though some areas are relatively deprived. The constituency stretches from the Blackfriars and Trinity areas, on the border of Manchester City Centre, featuring new high-rise apartments with high levels of graduates and professional workers, similarly Salford Quays, along with relatively working class areas of inner-city Salford such as Weaste and Seedley with higher proportions of social housing, through to the residential suburbs of Swinton, Clifton and Pendlebury in the Irwell Valley. The presence of the University of Salford also means there is a sizeable proportion of students in the constituency. In addition to the MediaCityUK and The Lowry development which attracts millions of visitors annually, other points of interest in the area include Clifton Country Park, Peel Park, and Ordsall Hall.

Salford forms part of Manchester's urban area and lies immediately to the west of Manchester city centre across the River Irwell, although it legally retains its own separate city status. Like much of Greater Manchester and Lancashire, Salford was an important centre for textile manufacturing during the industrial era, especially silk and cotton spinning. Coal mining was also present in the Pendlebury area. These industries have mostly disappeared and Salford experienced economic decline in the late 20th century due to deindustrialisation. The city was also a major inland port; the dockyards have now been redeveloped and contain MediaCityUK, a significant centre for media and television production.

There are high levels of deprivation in Salford city centre where many residents live in dense, socially rented terraces and flats. The redeveloped dockyards and the Blackfriars area close to Manchester city centre are wealthier, with many expensive high-rise apartments. The west of the constituency around Little Bolton is more affluent and suburban in character with larger, semi-detached homes. House prices across the constituency are similar to the rest of North West England and lower than the UK average.

Salford has a very large population of students and young adults and a very low proportion of retirees; the constituency contains the University of Salford which has around 26,000 students. Residents have low levels of income and homeownership and the child poverty rate is high. They are generally well-educated and a high proportion work in the health, technology and public sectors. The percentage of residents claiming unemployment benefits is high. White people made up 77% of the population at the 2021 census. Black people were 9% of the population and Asians were 7%. There is also a significant Jewish community concentrated in Broughton.

At the local city council, most of this constituency is represented by the Labour Party. In the most recent election in 2026, some Green Party councillors were elected in Ordsall and the dockyard area and some Reform UK representatives won seats in Salford city centre and the western suburbs. An estimated 53% of voters in Salford supported leaving the European Union in the 2016 referendum, similar to the UK-wide figure of 52%.

== History ==
The constituency was first established as a single-member parliamentary borough by the Reform Act 1832. It returned two MPs from 1868. It was abolished by the Redistribution of Seats Act 1885, when it was replaced by three single member (North, South and West).

The borough constituency was created for the 1997 general election, primarily from the abolished Salford East seat. This was abolished and absorbed into the new Salford and Eccles constituency for the 2010 election.

From 1997-2010 this was a very safe Labour seat which had some of the UK's most deprived areas, typified by council estates like Ordsall, Pendleton and Langworthy, which were due for apparent redevelopment. Higher Broughton has a considerable Jewish population and has some very decent residential housing, but during this period Labour were usually in the lead at local level; the Conservatives, like all the other neighbouring Manchester seats, tended to be in third place in General Elections before the decline of the Liberal Democrats in 2015.

Further to the completion of the 2023 review of Westminster constituencies, the seat was re-established (though is not identical to its 1997 incarnation) for the 2024 general election, replacing the now abolished Salford and Eccles seat once again.

== Boundaries ==
=== 1832–1885 ===
In 1832 the constituency was formed from the townships of Broughton, Pendleton and Salford, with part of the township of Pendlebury. The exact boundaries were defined in the Parliamentary Boundaries Act 1832:

From the Northernmost Point at which the Boundary of the Township of Salford meets the Boundary of the Township of Broughton, Northward, along the Boundary of the Township of Broughton, to the Point at which the same meets the Boundary of the Township of Pendleton; thence, Westward, along the Boundary of the Township of Pendleton to the Point at which the same meets the Boundary of the detached Portion of the Township of Pendlebury; thence, Southward, along the Boundary of the detached Portion of the Township of Pendlebury to the Point at which the same meets the Boundary of the Township of Salford; thence, Westward, along the Boundary of the Township of Salford to the Point first described.

In 1883 the detached portion of Pendlebury was absorbed by Pendleton.

=== 1997–2010 ===
The constituency was re-created for the 1997 election. It boundaries were defined by the Parliamentary Constituencies (England) Order 1995, and consisted of eight wards of the City of Salford: Blackfriars, Broughton, Claremont, Kersal, Langworthy, Ordsall, Pendleton, and Weaste & Seedley.

=== 2010 boundary review ===
Following its review of parliamentary representation in Greater Manchester, which was enacted in 2010, the Boundary Commission for England recommended that the City of Salford be split into three new constituencies:

- Blackley and Broughton, a cross-border constituency formed with wards in the to-be-abolished Manchester Blackley seat.
- Salford and Eccles took the most of the existing Salford seat and married it with central electoral wards of Eccles.
- Worsley and Eccles South brought Walkden, Worsley and parts of Eccles together in a new seat following the removal of the Wigan-Salford link.

=== Current ===
Further to the 2023 boundary review, from the 2024 general election, the re-established constituency is composed of the following wards of the City of Salford (as they existed on 1 December 2020):

- Blackfriars & Trinity; Broughton; Claremont; Ordsall; Pendlebury & Clifton; Pendleton & Charlestown; Quays; Swinton Park; Weaste & Seedley.

The constituency now comprises the majority of, and replaces, the constituency of Salford and Eccles - excluding the town of Eccles and Swinton town centre, which formed part of the new constituency of Worsley and Eccles. The town of Swinton was split, with residential areas in the Swinton Park ward instead joining this constituency.

It also includes Broughton, previously part of the abolished constituency of Blackley and Broughton. The ward of Kersal and Broughton Park, the other Salford City ward of that constituency, joined Bury South.

The new constituency varies from its 1997 version by inclusion of the Salford suburbs of Swinton and Pendlebury (which were in the now-defunct Eccles constituency), and exclusion of Kersal and Broughton Park which was annexed to Bury South for the first time.

== Members of Parliament ==
=== MPs 1832–1868 ===
Election	Member	Party
1832	Joseph Brotherton	Radical
1857 by-election	Edward Ryley Langworthy	Independent Whig
1857	William Nathaniel Massey	Radical
1859	William Nathaniel Massey	Liberal
1865	John Cheetham	Liberal
Representation increased to two members 1868

=== MPs 1868–1885 ===
Election	1st Member	1st Party	2nd Member	2nd Party
1868	Charles Edward Cawley	Conservative	William Thomas Charley	Conservative
1877 by-election	Oliver Ormerod Walker	Conservative	William Thomas Charley	Conservative
1880	Benjamin Armitage	Liberal	Arthur Arnold	Liberal
1885	Parliamentary borough split into three single-member divisions: see Salford North, Salford South, Salford West			

=== MPs 1997–2010 ===
Election	Member	Party
1997	Hazel Blears	Labour
2010	Constituency abolished; see Salford and Eccles	

=== MPs 2024–present ===
Election	Member	Party
2024	Rebecca Long-Bailey	Labour
2024	Rebecca Long-Bailey	Independent
2025	Rebecca Long-Bailey	Labour

== Elections ==
=== Elections in the 2020s ===
General election 2024: Salford
Party	Candidate	Votes	%	±%
Labour	Rebecca Long-Bailey	21,132	53.2	−4.2
Reform	Keith Whalley	6,031	15.2	+6.3
Green	Wendy Olsen	5,188	13.1	+8.8
Conservative	Hilary Scott	3,583	9.0	−14.3
Liberal Democrats	Jake Austin	2,752	6.9	+0.7
Workers Party	Mustafa Abdullah	791	2.0	N/A
SDP	Stephen Lewthwaite	227	0.6	N/A
Majority		15,101	38.0	+3.6
Turnout		39,704	47.5	−10.4
Registered electors		83,633		
Labour hold		Swing	−5.3	

=== Elections in the 2010s ===
2019 notional result
Party	Vote	%
Labour	23,977	57.4
Conservative	9,729	23.3
Brexit Party	3,703	8.9
Liberal Democrats	2,571	6.2
Green	1,783	4.3
Turnout	41,763	57.9
Electorate	72,169	

=== Elections in the 2000s ===
General election 2005: Salford
Party	Candidate	Votes	%	±%
Labour	Hazel Blears	13,007	57.6	−7.5
Liberal Democrats	Norman Owen	5,062	22.4	+6.2
Conservative	Laetitia Cash	3,440	15.2	−0.1
UKIP	Lisa Duffy	1,091	4.8	N/A
Majority		7,945	35.2	−13.7
Turnout		22,600	42.4	+0.8
Labour hold		Swing	−6.9	

General election 2001: Salford
Party	Candidate	Votes	%	±%
Labour	Hazel Blears	14,649	65.1	−3.9
Liberal Democrats	Norman Owen	3,637	16.2	+5.9
Conservative	Christopher King	3,446	15.3	−2.2
Socialist Alliance	Peter Grant	414	1.8	N/A
Independent	Sheilah Wallace	216	1.0	N/A
Independent	Roy Masterson	152	0.7	N/A
Majority		11,012	48.9	−2.6
Turnout		22,514	41.6	−14.7
Labour hold		Swing		

=== Elections in the 1990s ===
General election 1997: Salford
Party	Candidate	Votes	%	±%
Labour	Hazel Blears	22,848	69.0	
Conservative	Elliot Bishop	5,779	17.5	
Liberal Democrats	Norman J. Owen	3,407	10.3	
Referendum	Robert W. Cumpsty	926	2.8	
Natural Law	Susan Herman	162	0.5	
Majority		17,069	51.5	
Turnout		33,122	56.3	
Labour win (new seat)				

=== Elections in the 1880s ===
General election 1880: Salford (2 seats)
Party	Candidate	Votes	%	±%
Liberal	Benjamin Armitage	11,116	28.6	+3.8
Liberal	Arthur Arnold	11,110	28.5	+4.1
Conservative	William Thomas Charley	8,400	21.6	−3.8
Conservative	Oliver Ormerod Walker	8,302	21.3	−4.1
Majority		2,710	7.0	N/A
Majority		2,808	7.2	N/A
Turnout		19,464 (est)	87.1 (est)	+15.3
Registered electors		22,334		
Liberal gain from Conservative		Swing	+3.8	
Liberal gain from Conservative		Swing	+4.1	

=== Elections in the 1870s ===
1877 Salford by-election (1 seat)
Party	Candidate	Votes	%	±%
Conservative	Oliver Ormerod Walker	8,642	50.8	N/A
Liberal	Joseph Kay	8,372	49.2	N/A
Majority		270	1.6	+1.0
Turnout		17,014	77.2	+5.4
Registered electors		22,041		
Conservative hold		Swing	+0.0	

- Caused by Cawley's death.

General election 1874: Salford (2 seats)
Party	Candidate	Votes	%	±%
Conservative	Charles Edward Cawley	7,003	25.4	−0.2
Conservative	William Thomas Charley	6,987	25.4	+0.3
Liberal	Joseph Kay	6,827	24.8	−0.1
Liberal	Henry Lee	6,709	24.4	+0.0
Majority		160	0.6	+0.4
Turnout		13,763 (est)	71.8 (est)	−5.9
Registered electors		19,177		
Conservative hold		Swing	-0.1	
Conservative hold		Swing	+0.2	

=== Elections in the 1860s ===
General election 1868: Salford (2 seats)
Party	Candidate	Votes	%	±%
Conservative	Charles Edward Cawley	6,312	25.6	N/A
Conservative	William Thomas Charley	6,181	25.1	N/A
Liberal	John Cheetham	6,141	24.9	N/A
Liberal	Henry Rawson	6,018	24.4	N/A
Majority		40	0.2	N/A
Turnout		12,326 (est)	77.7 (est)	N/A
Registered electors		15,862		
Conservative gain from Liberal		Swing	N/A	
Conservative win (new seat)				

- Seat increased to two members

General election 1865: Salford (1 seat)
Party	Candidate	Votes	%	±%
Liberal	John Cheetham	Unopposed		
Registered electors		5,397		
Liberal hold				

By-election, 13 February 1865: Salford (1 seat)
Party	Candidate	Votes	%	±%
Liberal	John Cheetham	Unopposed		
Liberal hold				

- Caused by Massey's resignation after his appointment as a member of the Council of India.

=== Elections in the 1850s ===
General election 1859: Salford (1 seat)
Party	Candidate	Votes	%	±%
Liberal	William Nathaniel Massey	1,919	51.8	−8.0
Liberal	Henry Ashworth	1,787	48.2	N/A
Majority		132	3.6	−16.0
Turnout		3,706	87.8	+9.7
Registered electors		4,222		
Liberal hold		Swing	−8.0	

General election 1857: Salford (1 seat)
Party	Candidate	Votes	%	±%
Radical	William Nathaniel Massey	1,880	59.8	N/A
Radical	Elkanah Armitage	1,264	40.2	N/A
Majority		616	19.6	N/A
Turnout		3,144	78.1	N/A
Registered electors		4,028		
Radical gain from Independent Whig				

By-election, 2 February 1857: Salford (1 seat)
Party	Candidate	Votes	%	±%
Independent Whig	Edward Ryley Langworthy	Unopposed		
Independent Whig gain from Radical				

- Caused by Brotherton's death

General election 1852: Salford (1 seat)
Party	Candidate	Votes	%	±%
Radical	Joseph Brotherton	Unopposed		
Registered electors		2,950		
Radical hold				

=== Elections in the 1840s ===
General election 1847: Salford (1 seat)
Party	Candidate	Votes	%	±%
Radical	Joseph Brotherton	Unopposed		
Registered electors		2,605		
Radical hold				

General election 1841: Salford (1 seat)
Party	Candidate	Votes	%	±%
Radical	Joseph Brotherton	991	53.2	+3.1
Conservative	William Garnett	873	46.8	−3.1
Majority		118	6.4	+6.2
Turnout		1,864	76.3	+8.6
Registered electors		2,443		
Radical hold		Swing	+3.1	

=== Elections in the 1830s ===
General election 1837: Salford (1 seat)
Party	Candidate	Votes	%	±%
Radical	Joseph Brotherton	890	50.1	−8.1
Conservative	William Garnett	888	49.9	+8.1
Majority		2	0.2	−16.2
Turnout		1,778	67.7	+9.2
Registered electors		2,628		
Radical hold		Swing	−8.1	

General election 1835: Salford (1 seat)
Party	Candidate	Votes	%	±%
Radical	Joseph Brotherton	795	58.2	+0.3
Conservative	John Dugdale	572	41.8	−0.3
Majority		223	16.4	+0.6
Turnout		1,367	58.5	−24.3
Registered electors		2,336		
Radical hold		Swing	+0.3	

General election 1832: Salford (1 seat)
Party	Candidate	Votes	%
Radical	Joseph Brotherton	712	57.9
Tory	William Garnett	518	42.1
Majority		194	15.8
Turnout		1,230	82.8
Registered electors		1,497	
Radical win (new seat)			

== See also ==
- List of parliamentary constituencies in Greater Manchester
