= John Cheetham (manufacturer) =

John Cheetham, (1802 – 18 May 1886) was the son of George Cheetham (1757–1826), a prosperous cotton manufacturer whose business was based at mills in Castle Street, Stalybridge, Cheshire and Bankwood Mills, Stalybridge. The family was Nonconformist in religion and Liberal in politics. He served as MP for South Lancashire and later Salford.

During the Lancashire Cotton Famine in 1861–65, Cheetham rose to prominence as President of the Cotton Supply Association: a body that aimed to promote the growth and export of raw cotton outside the US and particularly in the British Raj. As the US cotton supply returned however, Cheetham's frequent attacks on the governance of the Raj gradually caused opinion in Britain and India to turn against the Association, and it dissolved in 1872.

His son John Frederick Cheetham was MP for North Derbyshire and later for Stalybridge.

Parliament of the United Kingdom
| Preceded by William Brown; Alexander Henry | Member of Parliament for South Lancashire; 1852 – 1859; With: William Brown | Succeeded by Algernon Fulke Egerton; William John Legh |
| Preceded by William Nathaniel Massey | Member of Parliament for Salford; 1865 – 1868 | Succeeded by Charles Edward Cawley; William Thomas Charley |
