= William Thomas Charley =

British judge and politician

Sir William Thomas Charley KC
- W T Charley as Common Serjeant of London (1878)

Common Serjeant of London
- In office 1878–1892

Member of Parliament for Salford (UK Parliament constituency)
- In office 1868–1880
- Preceded by: John Cheetham
- Succeeded by: Benjamin Armitage; Arthur Arnold

Personal details
- Born: 5 March 1833 Woodbourne, County Antrim, Ulster
- Died: 8 July 1904 (aged 71) East Grinstead, Sussex, England
- Education: St John's College, Oxford

Sir William Thomas Charley, KC (5 March 1833 – 8 July 1904) was a British judge and Conservative Party politician.

== Life ==
Charley was born in Woodbourne, County Antrim, Ulster in 1833, the youngest son of Matthew Charley and Anne Roberts.

He was educated at Elstree House School, Lee, Kent and St John's College, Oxford from where he matriculated in 1856. He enrolled as a law student at the Inner Temple, was called to the bar in 1865, and received a Doctorate in Civil Law in 1868.

He became involved in Conservative politics in the 1860s, and was elected as Member of Parliament for Salford at the 1868 general election. In parliament he advanced his protestant views on social matters and worked for the protection of children. He was defeated at the 1880 general election, and was an unsuccessful candidate at Ipswich at a by-election in 1883 and the 1885 general election, as well as unsuccessfully contesting the East Belfast by-election in 1892 as an Independent Conservative.

In 1878 he was elected as the senior legal office of Common Serjeant by the Corporation of London. The appointment caused controversy, as it was felt to be purely political, and that there was a large number of better-qualified lawyers who should have been considered. As a result, the Local Government Act 1888 removed the right of the city corporation to choose the serjeant, which was vested in the Crown.

In spite of criticism of Charley's performance of his duties, he remained as Common Serjeant until 1892, and was knighted and made a Queen's Counsel in 1880. He became a judge of the Central Criminal Court, and of the Mayor's Court.

He held a commission in the Volunteer Force, eventually reaching the rank of lieutenant-colonel, commanding the 3rd Volunteer Battalion, Royal Fusiliers.

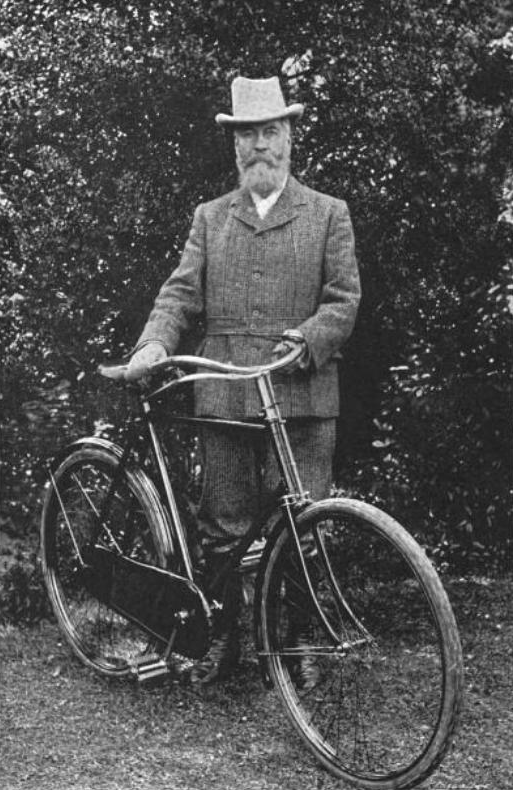
In The Sketch, 25 September 1901

Charley was the author of a number of books on law, religion and the constitution in which he defended the status quo. These included The Real Property Acts (1874), The Judicature Acts (1875), The Crusade Against the Constitution: An Historical Vindication of the House of Lords (1895), Mending and Ending the House of Lords (1900) and The Holy City, Athens and Egypt (1902).

Charley was an enthusiastic cyclist, and collapsed and died following a cycling trip in East Grinstead, Sussex, aged 71.

== Family ==
He married Clara Harbord on 10 February 1890. They had two daughters: Clara Noel Charley (1891–1973) and Estelle Dumergue Charley (1894–1939).

Parliament of the United Kingdom
Preceded by John Cheetham	Member of Parliament for Salford; 1868 – 1880; With: Charles Edward Cawley 1868–1877; Oliver Ormerod Walker 1877–1880	Succeeded by Benjamin Armitage; Arthur Arnold
