= The Echo (London) =

Newspaper

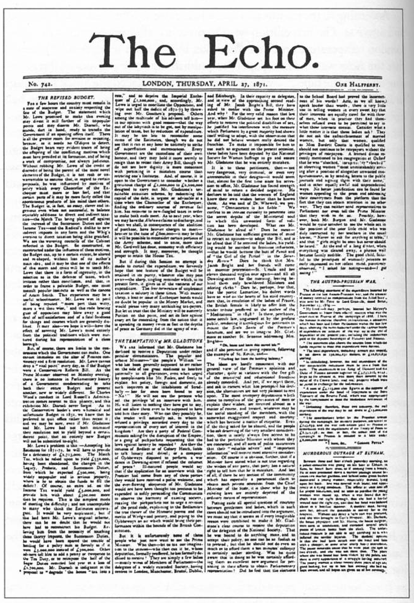
- Type: Evening newspaper
- LCCN: sn88063817
- Founded: 1868
- Ceased publication: 1905
- Headquarters: London, England
- OCLC number: 18305909

The Echo, founded in 1868 in London by Cassell, Petter, Galpin & Co., was London's first halfpenny evening newspaper (earlier provincial titles included Liverpool's Events and the South Shields Gazette, both launched in 1855). It was published daily except on Sunday. Sometimes its Saturday edition appeared under the name The Cricket Echo or The Football Echo. Issue Number 1 appeared on 8 December 1868. The Echo ceased publication with Issue Number 11,391 on 31 July 1905.

== History ==
Arthur Arnold was the editor for Messrs. Cassell, Petter & Galpin, who owned The Echo from 1868 until they sold it to Albert Grant in 1875. Upon the purchase by Grant, Arnold resigned as editor and went on a long trip to Russia and Persia. In less than 12 months as owner, Grant sold the newspaper to John Passmore Edwards in 1876. Edwards was the editor until its eventual sale in 1896 to a syndicate created for the purpose of purchasing The Echo. In 1884 Edwards sold a two-thirds interest in the paper to Andrew Carnegie and Samuel Storey but repurchased the entire interest due to disagreements over management policy. After selling his interest in 1896 Edwards left the paper. The Echo struggled financially and the syndicate sold a controlling interest to Frederick William Pethick-Lawrence in 1901. Pethick-Lawrence ran The Echo from 1902 to 1905, shutting down operations in August 1905.

Frances Power Cobbe was one of the main leader writers for the newspaper from 1868 to 1875. A collection of her leaders appeared as the book Re-Echoes in 1876.

== Editors ==
- 1868–1875: Arthur Arnold
- 1876–1896: John Passmore Edwards
- 1898–1900: William Montgomery Crook
- 1901-1902: Percy Alden
