= Benjamin Armitage =

English industrialist and politician

Armitage in 1880

Benjamin Armitage (1823 – 4 December 1899) was an English industrialist and Liberal politician who sat in the House of Commons from 1880 to 1886.

Armitage was the second son of Sir Elkanah Armitage, textile manufacturer, of Salford, and his wife Mary Bowers of Newton Heath. He was educated at Barton Hall School, Patricroft. He was a manufacturer at Manchester and in 1878 he was elected president of Manchester Chamber of Commerce. He was also a J. P. for Lancashire.

In the 1880 general election, Armitage was elected as one of two members of parliament for Salford. Under the Redistribution of Seats Act 1885, the Salford constituency was divided into three divisions, and Armitage was elected as the first MP for the new Salford West seat at the 1885 general election. A further election was held in 1886, and he was defeated by his Conservative opponent, Lees Knowles.

Armitage did not re-enter parliament. In January 1899 he was awarded the freedom of the Borough of Salford.

In 1856 he married Elizabeth Southam of Manchester. They made their home at Chomlea Bank, Pendleton.

The value of his estate at death was £277,472 which is the equivalent of £43,634,025 today.

Parliament of the United Kingdom
Preceded by Oliver Ormerod Walker; William Thomas Charley	Member of Parliament for Salford; 1880 – 1885; With: Arthur Arnold	Constituency abolished
New constituency	Member of Parliament for Salford West; 1885 – 1886	Succeeded by Lees Knowles
