= Arthur Arnold =

British politician and author (1833–1902)

Sir Arthur Arnold
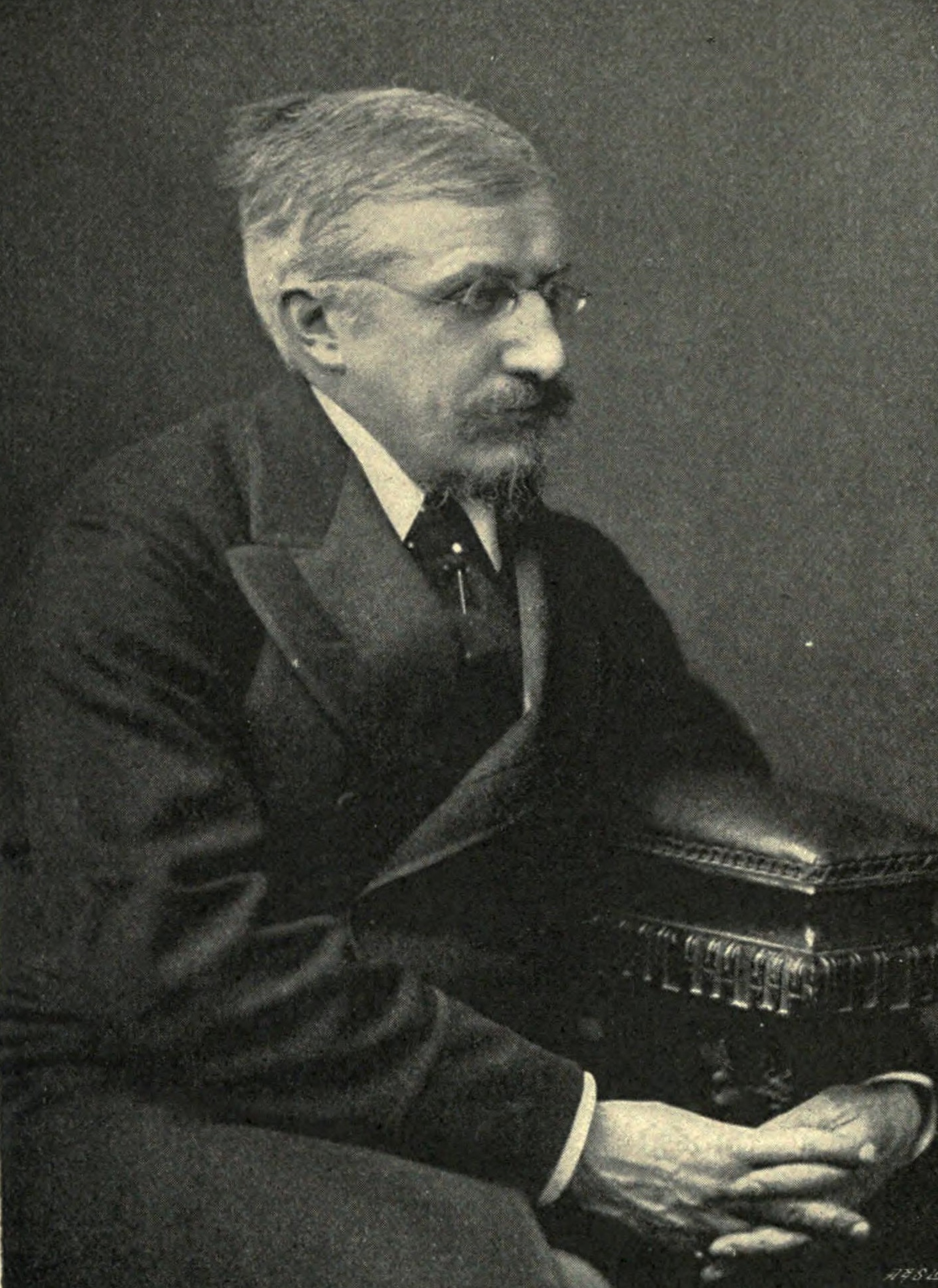
- Portrait of Arthur Arnold
- Born: 28 May 1833; Gravesend, Kent, England
- Died: 20 May 1902 (aged 68); Kensington, London, England
- Occupation: British politician

Sir (Robert) Arthur Arnold (28 May 1833 – 20 May 1902) was a British Liberal politician and author.

== Biography ==
He was the third son of Robert Coles Arnold, a justice of the peace of Framfield, Sussex, and the younger brother of poet Sir Edwin Arnold. Born in Gravesend, Kent, he was educated privately and trained as a surveyor and land agent.

In 1861, he was involved in the surveying operations prior to the construction of the Thames Embankment. Two years later he was appointed under the 1863 Public Works (Manufacturing Districts) Act as an Assistant Commissioner (and later Inspector) of Public Works in Lancashire, during the Cotton Famine, and subsequently wrote A History of the Cotton Famine. In his spare time he was a writer, and published two "sensation" novels: Ralph, or St Sepulchre's and St Stephen's (1863) and Hever Court (1867).

He made a tour of southern and eastern Europe in 1867, and became a strong supporter of the Kingdom of Greece a position he set out in From the Levant. In 1873 he was awarded the Golden Cross of the Order of the Saviour of Greece.

In 1867, he married Amelia Elizabeth Hyde of Castle Hyde, County Cork. They had no children. His wife was a campaigner for women's suffrage and a prominent public figure in her own right.

He was a member of the Radical faction of the Liberal Party, and in 1868 was the first editor of The Echo, a Liberal evening paper. In 1873 Arnold was an unsuccessful candidate for a by-election at Huntingdon. In 1875, soon after the sale of the Echo to Albert Grant, Arnold resigned his editorship and journeyed through the Middle East with his wife. He published an account of the thousand-mile journey in 1877 as Through Persia by Caravan.

In 1878, he published a collection of his political writings as Social Politics. Among the causes he supported were disestablishment of the Church of England, land law reform, reform of local government in The Metropolis, nationalisation of railways, women's suffrage and support for the temperance movement.

In 1880, he was elected as one of two members of parliament for Salford, with the Liberals gaining both seats at the expense of the Conservatives. The Redistribution of Seats Act 1885 split the parliamentary borough of Salford into three single-member divisions, and Arnold stood unsuccessfully for the new Salford North constituency in 1885 and 1886. At the 1892 general election he stood at Dorset North, but again failed to be elected.

On the creation of the London County Council in 1889, Arnold was elected as a county alderman, and was chairman of the council from 1895 to 1897. He was knighted in 1895. He was also a Deputy Lieutenant and Justice of the Peace for the County of London, and a Board of Trade Harbour Commissioner and JP for Dartmouth.

His beliefs were reflected in his presidency of the Free Land League and his membership of the London Anti-Vivisection Society.

Sir Arthur Arnold died suddenly at his Kensington, London, home in May 1902, aged 68.

== Works ==
- Arnold, Arthur (1877). The promises of Turkey . London: Eastern Question Association.

Parliament of the United Kingdom
Preceded by Oliver Ormerod Walker; William Thomas Charley	Member of Parliament for Salford; 1880 – 1885; With: Benjamin Armitage	Constituency abolished
Political offices
Preceded by Sir John Hutton	Chairman of the London County Council; 1895 – 1897	Succeeded by Dr William Collins
