= Elkanah Armitage =

British industrialist and politician (1794–1876)

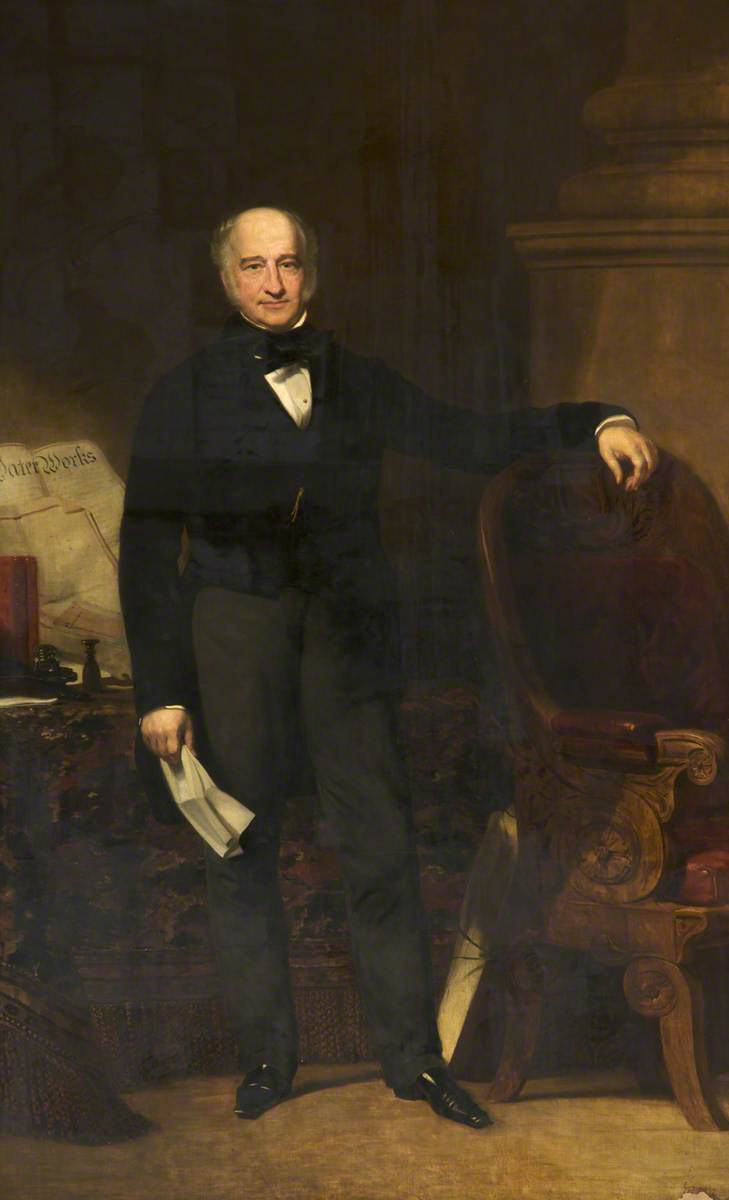
- Born: 6 September 1794
- Died: 26 November 1876 (aged 82)
- Known for: British industrialist and Liberal politician

Sir Elkanah Armitage DL (6 September 1794 – 26 November 1876) was a British industrialist and Liberal politician.

== Early life ==
He was born the third of six sons of Elkanah Armitage, a farmer and linen weaver from Failsworth, Lancashire. He left school at the age of 8 and went to work in the cotton industry, along with two of his brothers, at George Nadin & Nephews and soon rose to become manager on account of his diligence and growing shrewdness in business.

== Personal life ==
In 1816 he married Mary Lomax Bowers. She died in 1836 having borne him eight children; Elkanah, Benjamin, Samuel, Joseph, John, Rebecca, Jane Ann and Mary Bowers. Armitage then married Elizabeth Kirk, daughter of Captain Henry Kirk of Chapel-en-le-Frith and had one further son Vernon. Elizabeth died on 27 July 1868.

Armitage lived at Gore Hill, Pendleton Green until 1853 when he purchased Hope Hall, Pendleton, Salford.

== Industrial career ==
In the 1810s Armitage and his first wife set up in business as drapers at 18 Chapel Street, Salford, then sometime shortly after 1822 he set up a weaving manufacture business with James Thompson and by 1829 he was employing 29 workers and selling his cloths in Manchester at considerable profit. The business was so successful that he was able to build a new factory at Pendleton, Salford and eventually employed 200 people making sailcloth, ginghams and checks. By 1848, despite economic slumps he had extended Pendleton New Mill and was employing over 600. In 1867 the Armitages took over the Nassau Mills in Patricroft, Eccles.

== Political career ==
Armitage became active in politics from a young age and his name appeared on the Manchester petition for the abolition of the slave trade in 1806.

In 1838, Manchester was incorporated as a municipal borough, and Armitage was elected to the first town council as a Liberal councillor representing Exchange Ward. He became an alderman in 1841, and was Mayor of Manchester from 1846 to 1848. During his term of office there was a surge of support for the Chartist Movement, with the first mass meeting held in Manchester in September 1848.

In 1849, he was created a Knight Bachelor by Queen Victoria for his services as mayor during the crisis of the previous year.

In 1857, Armitage stood for Parliament, unsuccessfully opposing William Nathaniel Massey for the seat of Salford and in 1866 he was appointed High Sheriff of Lancashire, having represented the same county also as Deputy Lieutenant before.

Armitage was a lifelong friend and supporter of John Bright and the Anti-Corn Law League. He shared Bright's Pacifist stance and spoke out against the war in the Crimea, in opposition to Prime Minister Palmerston.

He served for many years as Chairman of the Governors of the Manchester Grammar School and as a Governor of Manchester Royal Infirmary. He was also a Salford Police Commissioner.

== Death ==
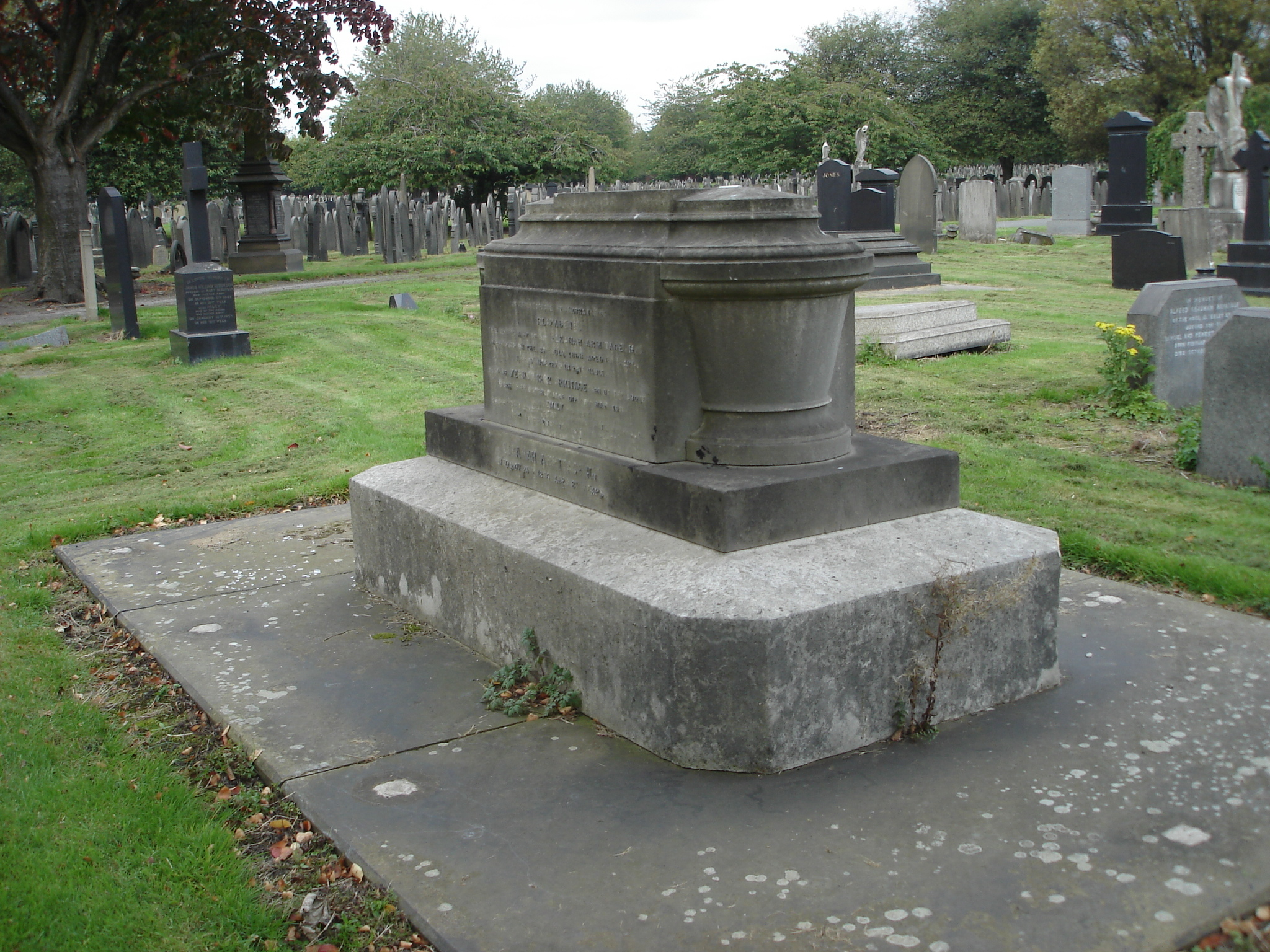
Armitage family vault, Weaste Cemetery

Armitage died on 26 November 1876 at Hope Hall, Pendleton at the age of 82, his funeral procession was half a mile long and was made up of a hundred carriages. His mortal remains were laid to rest at Weaste Cemetery. His will which was passed on 13 January 1877, valued his estate at £200,000. which today would be worth over 14 million pounds.

Civic offices
Preceded by William Benjamin Watkins	Mayor of Manchester; 1846–1848	Succeeded by Sir John Potter
