= Oliver Ormerod Walker =

British politician

Oliver Ormerod Walker (1833 – 30 May 1914) was a British Conservative Party politician.

He was the eldest son of Oliver Ormerod Walker and his second wife, Helen Elizabeth Garston, of Chesham House, near Bury, Lancashire. He was a magistrate, justice of the peace, and held a commission in the 7th Royal Lancashire Militia. He was also a Deputy-Lieutenant for Lancashire, Mayor of Bury and held the office of High Sheriff of Lancashire in 1876. On the formation of the Volunteer Force he became lieutenant colonel of the 8th Lancashire Rifle Volunteer Corps.

In 1877 he was chosen as Conservative candidate for Salford on the death of one of the sitting Members of Parliament (MP), Charles Cawley. He was successful at the by-election and served as MP until the 1880 general election, when both Salford seats were won by Liberals.

He married Jane Harrison in 1860. Walker died 30 May 1914, aged 81.

Parliament of the United Kingdom
Preceded by Charles Edward Cawley; William Thomas Charley	Member of Parliament for Salford; 1877 – 1880; With: William Thomas Charley	Succeeded by Benjamin Armitage; Arthur Arnold
Honorary titles
Preceded by John Pearson	High Sheriff of Lancashire; 1876	Succeeded by George Marton
