= Vernon Armitage =

English cricketer (1842–1911)

Personal information
- Full name: Vernon Kirk Armitage
- Born: 20 October 1842; Eccles, Lancashire
- Died: 8 May 1911 (aged 68); Birkdale, Lancashire
- Source: Cricinfo, 1 April 2017

Vernon Kirk Armitage (20 October 1842 – 8 May 1911) was an English first-class cricketer who played in one match for Cambridge University Cricket Club in 1864. Cricket websites indicate that he was born at Hope Hall, Eccles, then in Lancashire; a history of Salford, however, indicates that his father did not purchase Hope Hall until 11 years after Vernon's birth, and lived at Pendleton before 1853. Vernon Armitage died at Birkdale, also then Lancashire.

Vernon Armitage was the sixth son of the Lancashire industrialist Sir Elkanah Armitage and the only child of his father's second marriage. He was educated at Harrow School and at Trinity College, Cambridge. There is no record that he played cricket at Harrow and his only first-class appearance came in the match between Cambridge University and the Marylebone Cricket Club in 1864, when he batted low in the order and scored six runs in his only innings.

Armitage graduated from Cambridge with both Bachelor of Arts (BA) and Bachelor of Laws (LL.B) degrees in 1865; the BA converted automatically to a Master of Arts in 1868. Before graduation he had been accepted as a trainee lawyer at the Inner Temple and he was called to the bar in 1866, practising on the Northern Circuit. Later he became a Justice of the Peace in Lancashire, and was also vice-chairman of Lancashire County Council.

== See also ==
- List of Cambridge University Cricket Club players
