= Charles Edward Cawley =

British civil engineer and politician

Member of Parliament for Salford
- In office 1868–1877 Serving with William Thomas Charley
- Preceded by: John Cheetham
- Succeeded by: William Thomas Charley; Oliver Ormerod Walker

Personal details
- Born: 1812
- Died: 2 April 1877 (aged 64–65) Salford
- Spouse: Harriet Motley (m. 1842)

Charles Edward Cawley (1812 – 2 April 1877) was a British civil engineer and Conservative Party politician.

He was the only son of Samuel Cawley of Goodden House, Middleton, Lancashire and his wife Mary Jones of Packington, Warwickshire. He became involved in Conservative politics and for many years was an alderman on Salford Borough Council. In 1842 he married Harriet Motley.

Under the Representation of the People Act 1867 the parliamentary borough of Salford was given a second Member of Parliament, and Cawley was elected at the 1868 general election by a small majority. He comfortably retained his seat at the 1874 general election.

Charles Cawley died at his residence the Heath, Vine Street, Salford, on 2 April 1877 aged 65.

Parliament of the United Kingdom
Preceded by John Cheetham	Member of Parliament for Salford; 1868 – 1877; With: William Thomas Charley 1868–1877	Succeeded by William Thomas Charley; Oliver Ormerod Walker
