= Grade II listed buildings in Liverpool-L12 =

Liverpool is a city and port in Merseyside, England, which contains many listed buildings. A listed building is a structure designated by English Heritage of being of architectural and/or of historical importance and, as such, is included in the National Heritage List for England. There are three grades of listing, according to the degree of importance of the structure. Grade I includes those buildings that are of "exceptional interest, sometimes considered to be internationally important"; the buildings in Grade II* are "particularly important buildings of more than special interest"; and those in Grade II are "nationally important and of special interest". Very few buildings are included in Grade I — only 2.5% of the total. Grade II* buildings represent 5.5% of the total, while the great majority, 92%, are included in Grade II.

Liverpool contains more than 1,550 listed buildings, of which 28 are in Grade I, 109 in Grade II*, and the rest in Grade II. (Note: These figures are taken from a search in the National Heritage List for England in May 2013, and are subject to variation as further buildings are listed, grades are revised, or buildings are delisted.) This list contains the Grade II listed buildings in the L12 postal district of Liverpool. The major building in the district is Croxteth Hall, which is listed at Grade II*, and many of the buildings in the surrounding park and area are included in this list. The village of West Derby is at the main entrance to Croxteth Park, and various structures in the village are listed at Grade II. Elsewhere the district is residential, and contains a number of listed houses.

Grade II listed buildings from other areas in the city can be found through the box on the right, along with the lists of the Grade I and Grade II* buildings in the city.

== Buildings ==
Name	Location	Photograph	Built	Notes
Alder Lodge	Alder Road; 53.42100°N 2.90045°W	—	Mid 19th century	A brick house with a steeply pitched slate roof. It is in a single storey with an attic. Its front has two bays, with a single bay facing the road. There is a Tudor arched doorway with a Gothic-style door, and a dormer in a gable with a decorative bargeboard. There is a more elaborate bargeboard in the gable facing the road.
Entrance, Sandfield Park	Alder Road; 53.42106°N 2.90090°W	—	1840s	This consists of three stone gate piers with flanking walls at the entrance to a Victorian residential estate. The gate piers have moulded caps, and there are also piers at the ends of the walls.
Thimble Hall	Alder Road; 53.4211°N 2.9011°W	—	1847	Originating as a lodge, this is a stone building with a slate roof. It is in single storey, and has a three-bay front. Most of the windows have two lights and are mullioned. The entrance has a Tudor arch with a lancet window above. On the sides are canted bay windows, each under a gable containing a quatrefoil.
Eddesbury	Almonds Green; 53.4342°N 2.9139°W	—	1885–85	Originating as a villa designed by J. Francis Doyle, it is in free Jacobean style. It is built in brick with sandstone dressings, and has a Westmorland slate roof. The building has an irregular plan, with two storeys and attics, and a front of six bays with shaped gables. The porch is carried on paired Tuscan columns. During the 20th century it was used as the Margaret Beavan Special School.
Entrance lodge, Eddesbury	Almonds Green; 53.43391°N 2.91363°W	—	1885–85	The lodge was probably designed by J. Francis Doyle. It is built in brick with a Westmorland slate roof. The lodge has a T-shaped plan, with a gabled entrance front. It is in two storeys, with decorative brickwork in the upper part of the gable. The windows are casements.
Wall, gate piers and post box, Eddesbury	Almonds Green; 53.43445°N 2.91382°W	—	1885–85	The sandstone wall surrounds the garden of the former villa. It includes three pairs of gate piers, two of which have a cornice and a ball finial, and another with a pyramidal cap. The wall also incorporates an Edward VII letter box.
Hare and Hounds Public House	Almonds Green; 53.4328°N 2.9103°W		After 1885	A stuccoed public house with a slate roof, and later added details. It is in two storeys, and has a three-bay front. At the top is an entablature, with pediments over the lateral bays. In the central bay is a first floor iron balcony. The entrances are round-headed with fanlights.
—	2–6 Almonds Green; 53.4329°N 2.9095°W	—	c. 1861–70	A row of three houses designed by W. Eden Nesfield. They are built in red brick with blue brick diapering, and have slate roofs with red ridge tiles. The houses are in a single storey with attics, and each house has three bays. The attics contain half-dormers and the windows are sashes.
West Derby Public House	8 Almonds Green; 53.4330°N 2.9098°W		Early 19th century	The public house is built in painted brick with applied timber decoration. It has two storeys, and is in two gabled bays, the gable of the left bay containing an attic. In the right bay is a single-storey canted bay window. The windows are sashes.
—	10 Almonds Green; 53.43296°N 2.91033°W	—	1660	A stone house with a roof of concrete tiles. It has two storeys, and is in two bays. The entrance has a Tudor arch, above which is a plaque with initials and the date. In the bottom storey are five-light mullioned windows; in the upper storeys are similar windows with three lights.
—	11, 11A and 13 Almonds Green; 53.43286°N 2.91062°W	—	c. 1800	A row of shops, built in brick with slate roofs. They have two storeys, and are in four bays, with modern shop fronts. The windows in the upper floor are sashes.
—	15, 17, 19A and 19 Almonds Green; 53.4330°N 2.9111°W	—	Early 19th century	A row of shops, built in brick with slate roofs. They have two storeys, and are in four bays, with modern shop fronts. The windows in the upper floor are sashes.
—	97–103 Almonds Green; 53.4355°N 2.9159°W	—	1863	A row of charity cottages built by the Croxteth Estate. They are constructed in red sandstone with slate roofs, and are in Tudorbethan style. The houses have two storeys, and a five-bay front, the outer two bays projecting forward. Above the entrances is a cartouche with an inscription and the date. The windows are mullioned and have two and three lights.
Aintree Lodge	Croxteth Hall Lane; 53.4461°N 2.8988°W	—	Early 19th century	A brick house on a stone base with stone dressings and a hipped roof. It is in a single storey, and has a three-bay front. The central bay is canted, and there is a two-bay extension at the rear.
Old School House	Croxteth Hall Lane; 53.4380°N 2.8872°W	—	19th century	This originated as a school, later converted into a house. It is built in red brick on a stone base with stone dressings, and has a hipped slate roof. It is in a single storeys, and has a three-bay front. The quoins and cornice are rusticated, and the windows are casements.
The Cottage	Croxteth Hall Lane; 53.4395°N 2.8894°W	—	18th century	The cottage was extended later. The original part is in brick with a slate roof. It has two storeys and is in three bays, with horizontal-sliding sash windows. The later bay has an upper floor with timbering and decorative bargeboards.
Bantam house	Croxteth Park; 53.44450°N 2.88984°W	—	Early 19th century	The bantam house is built in brick with a single roof. It has a square plan with a canted front. The central entrance and the windows have heads with pointed arches; around these are rustic-style timber architraves.
Bridge	Croxteth Park; 53.44127°N 2.89554°W		1845	The bridge carries Croxteth Hall Lane over the path to the hall. It is built in rusticated stone with an archivolt, a cornice and a parapet. The keystones are carved with the Molyneux arms and a coronet. On the north and south sides are curved flanking walls.
Bull box	Croxteth Park; 53.44077°N 2.89150°W	—	Early 19th century	The bull box is built in brick with stone dressings and has a hipped slate roof. It has a square plan, with segmental-headed windows on the north and south sides, and a segmental-headed entrance on the east side.
Carriage washing shelter	Croxteth Park; 53.44149°N 2.89189°W	—	Mid 19th century	The shelter consists of eight Tuscan-style iron columns supporting a timber roof, which is slated. To the south of this is a stone trough with an iron pump.
Cottages, stable yard	Croxteth Park; 53.44121°N 2.89161°W	—	Early 19th century	The two cottages are built in brick with slate roofs. They are in two storeys, and stretch for four bays. The windows are casements with segmental heads, and two half-dormers.
Farm Lodge	Croxteth Park; 53.4414°N 2.8924°W	—	Early to mid 19th century	The lodge is built in brick on a stone base with stone dressings and a slate roof. It is in a single storey, and has a two-bay gabled front. The windows are paired with segmental heads, keystones and chamfered mullions.
Head gamekeeper's cottage	Croxteth Park; 53.44505°N 2.88542°W	—	1870s	The cottage was designed by John Douglas. It is built in red brick with a roof of patterned blue and green slate and a tiled crest. It is in a single storey, with four bays. Features include a tile-hung gable with a lunette vent, and a lintel with an incised cross moline.
Home farmhouse	Croxteth Park; 53.44086°N 2.89188°W		Early 19th century	The farmhouse was extended in the 1860s. It is built in brick with a tiled roof, the extension having stone dressings. The original part of the farmhouse has two storeys and is in two bays, the extension is in a single storey. The windows are sliding sashes.
Kennels	Croxteth Park; 53.4453°N 2.8847°W		1870s	The kennels were designed by John Douglas for the 4th Earl of Sefton. They are built in red brick with a roof of patterned blue and green slate and a tiled crest. The kennels are in a single storey, and have a three-bay front. To the right of the entrance are a pump and a stone trough. Associated with the kennels are exercise yards and a paddock with iron railings.
North entrance, stable yard	Croxteth Park; 53.4419°N 2.8918°W	—	Early 18th century (probable)	The entrance consists of a pair of stone gate piers. They are decorated with channelled rustication, panelled pilasters, entablatures, and urn finials.
Riding School	Croxteth Park; 53.4417°N 2.8917°W	—	Early 19th century	The riding school stands to the south of Croxteth Hall, and has been converted into a restaurant. A small extension was added to the east side in 1905. The structure has a square plan, with a central courtyard, and is in a single storey. It is built in brick with stone dressings and has a slate roof. Along the south aspect are loose boxes.
Stand Farmhouse	Croxteth Park; 53.4499°N 2.8798°W	—	1689	The farmhouse was extended in 1731, and again in the 19th century. It is in two storeys, with a four-bay. The porch has a shaped gable and a casement window. Above the porch is a plaque with the arms of the Molyneux family. On the right side is a bay window.
Stand Farm Barn	Croxteth Park; 53.4501°N 2.8801°W	—	1689	The barn was extended in 1731. It is built in brick with stone dressings on a stone base, and has a slate roof. The features include segmental-headed entrances, a window, and ventilating eyes.
Stand Farm Lodge	Croxteth Park; 53.45487°N 2.87652°W	—	19th century	The lodge is built in brick with a slate roof. It has two storeys, and is in two bays. The windows are casements. A porch has been added on the gable end.
—	65–71 Eaton Road North; 53.4317°N 2.9135°W	—	1773	A row of four brick houses with slate roofs. They have two storeys, and each house is in a single bay. Over the entrances and windows are wedge lintels; the windows are sashes.
Finch Lodge	Deysbrook Lane; 53.43798°N 2.88129°W	—	Early 19th century	The lodge to Croxteth Hall is built in brick with a hipped slate roof. It is in one storey, with a front of three bays, and sides of two bays. The eaves are deep and overhanging. The windows are three-light sliding sashes. The lodge has a square porch with a stone cornice.
—	283 and 285 Deysbrook Lane; 53.4365°N 2.8859°W	—	Late 18th century (probable)	A pair of cottages in brick on a sandstone plinth and slate roofs. They are in two storeys, each cottage having one bay, and with lean-to extensions. The windows are casements.
Lowlands	Hayman's Green; 53.4329°N 2.9145°W	—	Mid 19th century	This was built as a villa, and from 1957 has been the headquarters of the West Derby Community Association. It is built in stuccoed brick with painted ornamentation, and has hipped slate roofs. The house is in Italianate style with two storeys, attics and a basement, and a symmetrical three-bay front. The interior has retained many of its original features, including an elaborately decorated double staircase, galleries and, at the top, a lantern. The attached boundary walls and gate piers are included in the listing.
—	2 and 4 Hayman's Green; 53.4320°N 2.9114°W	—	Mid 19th century	A pair of stuccoed houses with slate roofs. They are in two storeys, and each house has two bays, the middle two bays projecting forward. At the top of the houses is a frieze. All the windows are sashes, those in the upper floor having three lights under round heads, those in the lower floor having architraves. In the porches are round-headed entrances.
The Casbah Club	8 Hayman's Green; 53.4324°N 2.9120°W		c. 1860	This originated as a villa in red brick with stone dressings, in two storeys and an attic. In 1957 Mona Best, mother of the drummer Pete Best bought the house and in 1959 opened the basement as a coffee and music club. Early performers were The Quarrymen, and it became the performance birthplace of The Beatles. The rest of the house has been altered, but the basement retains features relating to the early development of the Beatles.
Leyfield House	Honey Green Lane; 53.4224°N 2.8908°W	—	1830s	A stuccoed house with a slate roof, it is in two storeys. There is a front of three bays, with a two-bay wing. The windows are sashes with architraves. The porch is in Doric style, with an Ionic entablature and a balustrade. The house stands within the campus of Cardinal Heenan Catholic High School, and has been converted for use by the school.
—	67 Leyfield Road; 53.4271°N 2.8958°W	—	17th century (probable)	A stone house with a stone tile roof. It is in two storeys and has three bays. The windows are casements, and there is a 20th-century open timber porch.
St Mary's West Derby Church of England Primary School	Meadow Lane; 53.4333°N 2.9096°W		1860–61	The school was designed by H. P. Horner in Gothic Revival style. It is built in sandstone, is in a single storey, and has an L-shaped plan. On the front facing the road are a 20th-century casement window, a lancet window, and a large four-light window with Decorated tracery. Above the lancet window is tower with a diagonal buttress, bell openings, and a stone pyramidal roof.
St James' Church	Mill Lane; 53.4275°N 2.9135°W		1845–46	The church was designed by Edward Welch, and in 1875–76 the chancel was lengthened and a chapel and organ chamber were added by W. and J. Hay. It is built in sandstone, and consists of a nave without aisles, transepts, a chancel with a chapel and a vestry, and a west tower. The windows are lancets, and there are dormers in the roof. In 1994 the interior was re-ordered, and a wall was inserted to form a parish hall at the back of the church.
—	76–82 Mill Lane; 53.4307°N 2.9113°W	—	Early to mid 19th century	A row of four brick houses with stone dressings and slate roofs in Georgian style. They have two storeys and basements, and each house is in a single bay. At the top is a cornice. The windows are sashes with wedge lintels. The entrances are round-headed with panelled pilasters and fanlights.
—	92–96 Mill Lane; 53.4301°N 2.9117°W	—	Early to mid 19th century	A terrace of four brick houses with stone dressings and slate roofs in Georgian style. They have two storeys, and each house is in three bays. The windows are sashes with wedge lintels. The entrances are round-headed with panelled pilasters and fanlights.
Sandheys	158 Mill Lane; 53.4278°N 2.9149°W	—	c. 1833–36	A stuccoed house with a slate roof. It is in two storeys, and has a three bay front. At the top is an entablature, and at the ends are pilasters. The windows are sashes, and there is an Ionic porch with pairs of columns. At the sides of the house are two-storey canted bay windows.
Kiln Hey	Sandfield Park; 53.4245°N 2.9030°W	—	1860s	The house was extended in 1885, and later converted into a nursing home. It is built in brick with stone dressings, and has a slate roof. It is in two storeys with four bays. It has a Venetian window, the other windows being either mullioned and transomed, or sashes. Internal features include panelled rooms, an Adamesque ceiling, and a staircase under a coffered barrel vault.
St Ives	Sandfield Park; 53.4230°N 2.9077°W	—	1853	A stone house with a slate roof in Italianate style. It has two storeys and an attic, and a front of five bays. The second bay projects forward and has a gable with a bargeboard. The porch is also gabled, with a decorative bargeboard, and the window above has an architrave, a frieze and a cornice. On the left side of the house is a two-storey canted bay window.
St Paul's Church, West Derby	Town Row; 53.4292°N 2.9018°W	—	1914–15	A Roman Catholic church designed by Pugin and Pugin and constructed in sandstone with a slate roof. It consists of a nave with a northwest baptistry, aisles, a chancel with flanking chapels, and a short southwest tower, and is in a free Perpendicular style. The marble and alabaster fittings were also designed by Pugin and Pugin. The interior was reordered in 1973–75.
—	52 and 54 Town Row; 53.43101°N 2.90646°W	—	1830s	A pair of brick houses on a slate-clad base, with slate roofs. They are in two storeys. No. 52 has two bays and No. 54 has one. The windows are casements.
—	56 Town Row; 53.43089°N 2.90633°W	—	1830s	A brick house with stone dressings and a hipped slate roof. It is in two storeys, and has three bays. The windows are sashes with wedge lintels. On the left side is a two-storey gabled porch.
Main lodge, Croxteth Hall	West Derby Village; 53.4328°N 2.9088°W		1860s	This was the lodge at the main entrance to Croxteth Hall, and was probably designed by W. Eden Nesfield. It is in two storeys with a three-bay front, and is in Tudorbethan style. The left and central bays project forward under gables. The windows have two and three lights and are mullioned. The gate piers carry stone lions sejant holding iron pennants.
Village pound and stocks	West Derby Village; 53.43293°N 2.91009°W		Late 18th century (probable)	The pound consists of two sandstone walls over 5 feet (1.5 m) high, the other two walls having been replaced by railings. Inside are the stocks, consisting of an iron bench and three pairs of leg stocks. The whole was replanted as a garden to celebrate the coronation of Edward VII.
Street lamp and fountain	West Derby Village; 53.43266°N 2.90946°W		1894	The lamp and drinking fountain are opposite the main entrance to Croxteth Hall. They were designed by A. P. Fry, and are in stone and bronze. They stand on the round base with buttresses, and have a niche with mosaic, and a drinking bowl for dogs. At the top is a cornice with an inscription, and an elaborate lamp and a lantern.
Lodge, Broughton Hall	Yew Tree Lane; 53.42518°N 2.88829°W		1850s	The lodge is in Gothic style. It is built in stone, and has a steep slate roof. The lodge is in a single storey with an attic. The windows, and the entrance in the gabled porch, have ogee heads. On some of the gables are ball finials.

== See also ==
- Architecture of Liverpool

== References and notes ==
Notes

Citations

Sources

- Hubbard, Edward (1991), The Work of John Douglas, London: The Victorian Society, ISBN 0-901657-16-6
- Pollard, Richard; Pevsner, Nikolaus (2006), Lancashire: Liverpool and the South-West, The Buildings of England, New Haven and London: Yale University Press, ISBN 0-300-10910-5
- Pye, Ken (2011), Discover Liverpool, Liverpool: Trinity Mirror Media, ISBN 978-1-906802-90-5
