= Tue Brook =

Stream in Liverpool, England

Coordinates: 53.42521°N 2.93106°W

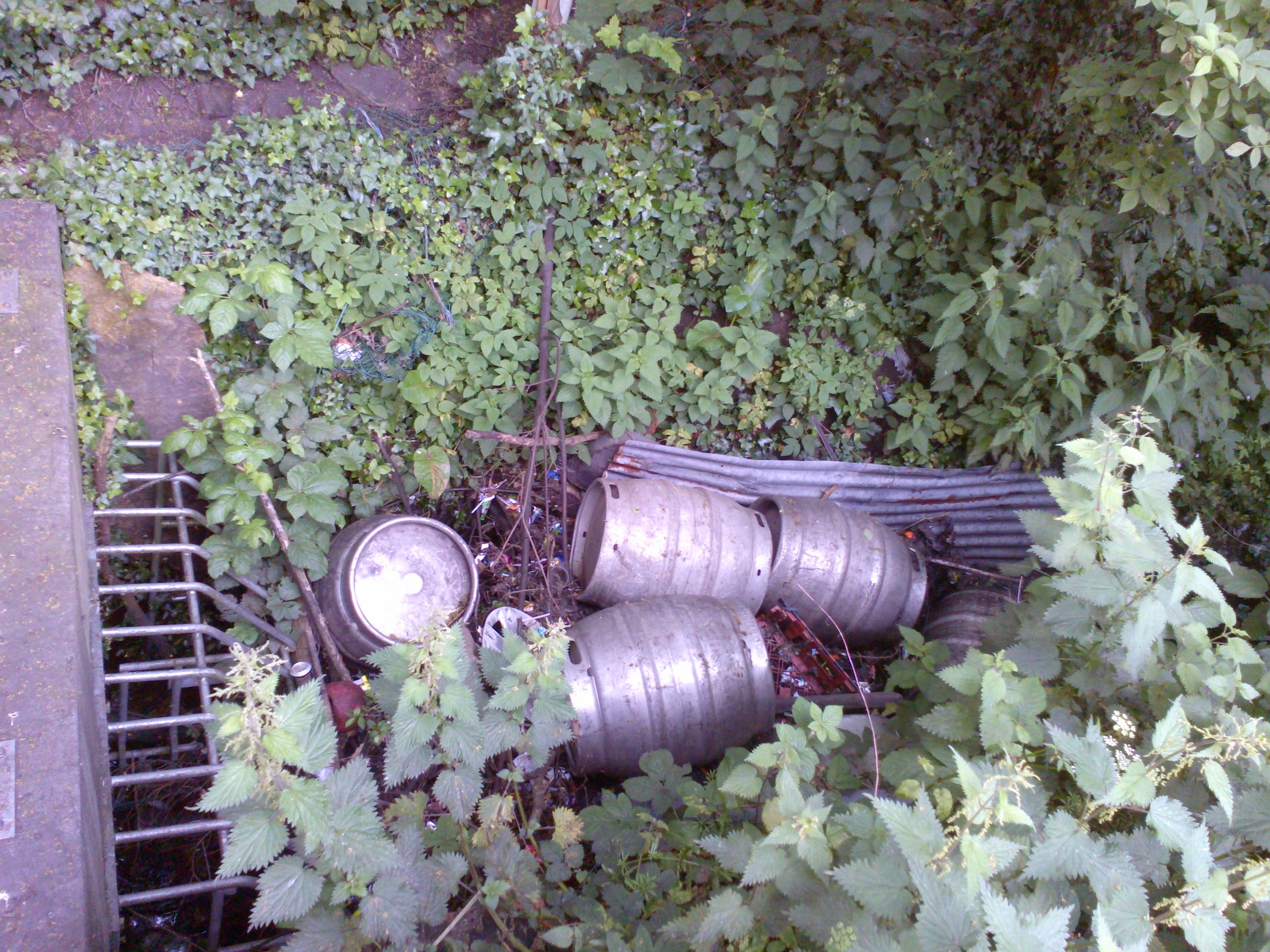
Start of Tue Brook culvert

The Tue Brook or Tew Brook is a small river or stream in Liverpool. It flows through the suburb of West Derby and is the main tributary of the River Alt. The brook is now almost entirely culverted and runs underground, but is remembered in the name of Tuebrook.

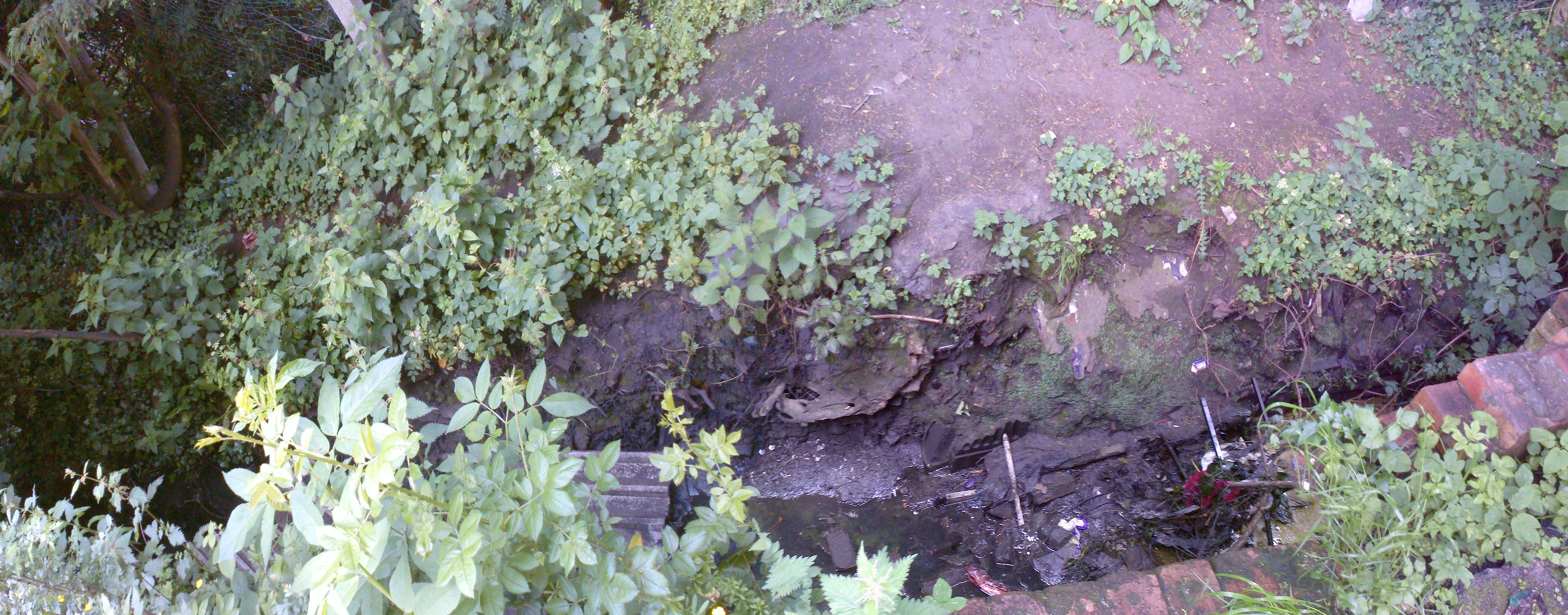
The Tue Brook at West Derby Road

Although it is sometimes said to be derived from the name of the god Tiw, the name "Tue Brook", recorded as "Tubrucke" in the 16th century, may be derived from an Old English phrase meaning "meeting place by a brook". The watercourse formed the natural drainage of the districts of Walton and Club Moor, flowing north eastwards to the Alt. Over time, as the suburbs of Liverpool grew, the brook came to receive much of the sewage of the township of West Derby, with the result that it became highly polluted. The Tue Brook was, as a result, the subject of a court case in 1872, when an owner of land through which it ran was successful in obtaining an injunction in Chancery against polluters.

Much of the brook was still open as late as the earlier 20th century, but urban development along its course has resulted in the upper Tue Brook being mostly diverted underground, and the lower brook being similarly treated with the exception of some longer open stretches near Long Lane. Despite this, the brook is still locally reputed to feed the pond in Larkhill Gardens, Clubmoor, and has been identified as a significant source of historic flooding, as the culverts are of inadequate size and in poor condition.
