= St Thomas Indian Orthodox Church, Liverpool =

Coordinates: 53.4275°N 2.9135°W

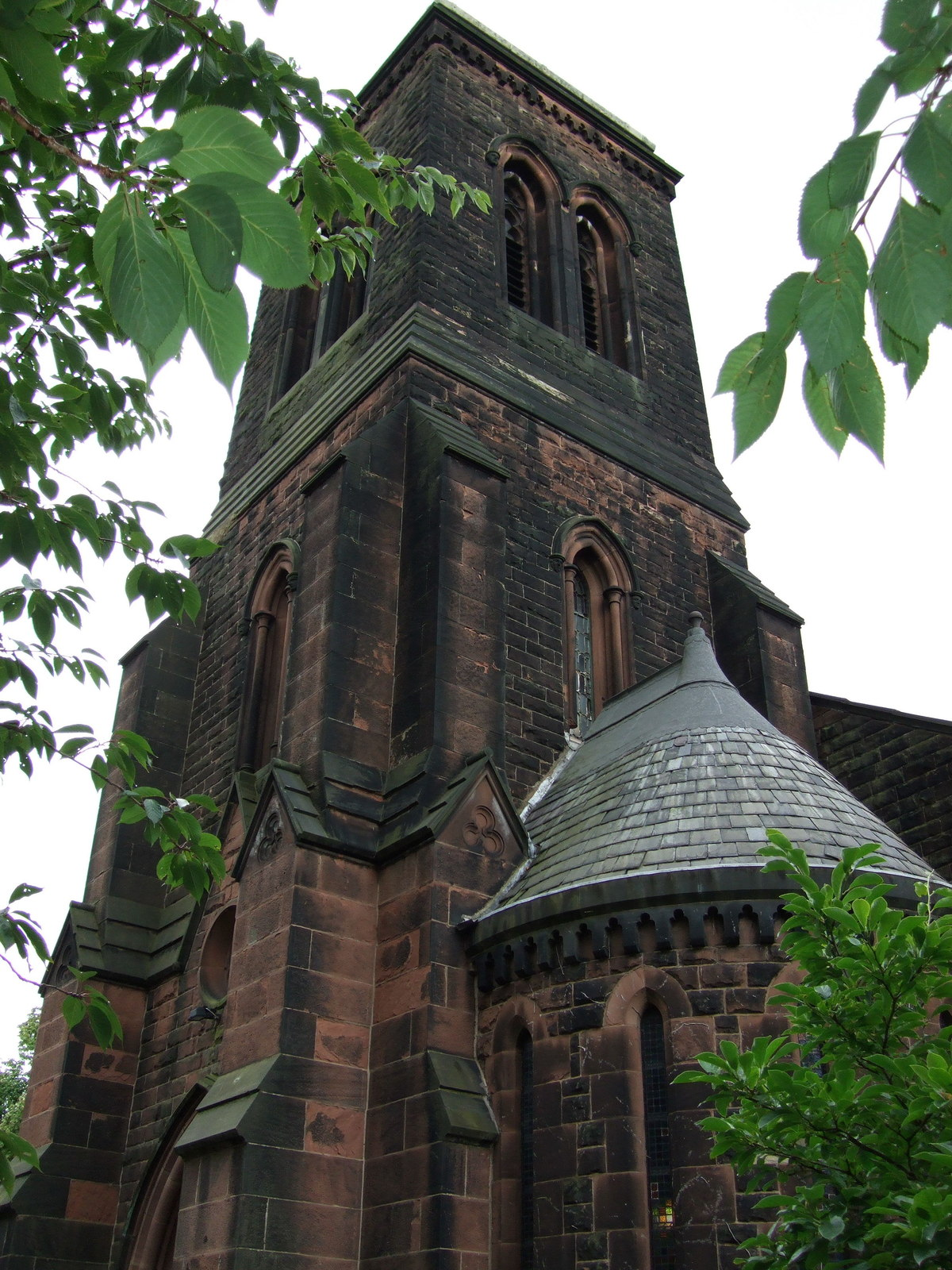
- Tower of St Thomas Indian Orthodox Church

- Location in Merseyside
- OS grid reference: SJ 394 927
- Location: Mill Lane, West Derby, Liverpool, Merseyside
- Country: England
- Denomination: Malankara (Indian) Orthodox
- Website: St Thomas Indian Orthodox Church

History
- Former name(s): St James' Church, West Derby
- Status: Parish church

Architecture
- Functional status: Active
- Heritage designation: Grade II
- Designated: 19 June 1985
- Architect(s): Edward Welch, W. and J. Hay
- Architectural type: Church
- Style: Gothic Revival
- Groundbreaking: 1845
- Completed: 1876

Specifications
- Materials: Sandstone

Administration
- Diocese: UK, Europe and Africa

Clergy
- Vicar: Rev. Fr. Jeeson P Wilson

St Thomas Indian Orthodox Church, Liverpool (formerly St James' Church, West Derby) is located on Mill Lane, West Derby, a suburb of Liverpool, Merseyside, England. It was an active Anglican parish church in the deanery of West Derby, the archdeaconry of Liverpool, and the diocese of Liverpool until 23 June 2019 when responsibility was handed over to the Indian Orthodox Church. Its benefice is united with that of St Mary, West Derby. The church is designated by English Heritage as a Grade II listed building.

== History ==
The church was designed by Edward Welch and built in 1845–46. The original short chancel was replaced by a larger one by W. and J. Hay in 1875–76, and at the same time a south organ chamber, a north vestry, and a semicircular structure to the south of the tower, providing a staircase to the tower and new steps to the gallery, were added. Originally the church has a slim broach spire, but this became unsafe, and was demolished and replaced by a low pyramidal roof in 1970. In 1994 the interior of the church was re-ordered, the pews were removed, and a wall was inserted to form a parish hall at the rear.

== Architecture ==
=== Exterior ===
St James' is orientated north–south; in the following description ritual orientation is used. The church is built in red sandstone. Its plan consists of a five-bay nave, north and south transepts, a chancel with a north chapel and a south vestry, and a west tower with a baptistry to the south. The tower is in three stages, with a west doorway, lancet windows, louvred bell openings, and a pyramidal roof. There are more lancet windows along the sides of the church, and a five lancets at the east end. In the roof are dormers.

=== Interior ===
Inside the church the former west gallery is now in the parish hall. Most of the stained glass was designed by Carl Almquist, E. H. Jewitt and W. J. Tipping, all of the Lancaster firm Shrigley and Hunt, with the glass in the lancet windows at the east end, dated 1876, by William Wailes. The three-manual pipe organ was built in 1869–70 by William Hill and Son. Originally in the west gallery, it was moved to the chancel in 1876, and it was rebuilt and enlarged, again by William Hill, in 1895. There is a ring of six bells, all cast in 1859 by George Mears at the Whitechapel Bell Foundry.

== See also ==
- Grade II listed buildings in Liverpool-L12
