= Broughton Hall High School =

Location
- Yew Tree Lane; Liverpool, Merseyside, L12 9HJ; England; 53.424051°N 2.888224°W

Information
- Type: Voluntary aided comprehensive, former grammar school.
- Motto: ‘Cor Unum et Anima Una’ – ‘One Heart and One Mind’
- Religious affiliation: Roman Catholic
- Established: 1928
- Founder: Sisters of Mercy
- Local authority: Liverpool City Council
- Department for Education URN: 104713 Tables
- Ofsted: Reports
- Chairman: J Hartley
- Headteacher: S O'Rourke
- Gender: Girls
- Age: 11 to 18
- Enrolment: 1300~
- Website: http://www.broughtonhall.com/

Broughton Hall High School is an all-girls', Roman Catholic secondary school and sixth form located in the West Derby area of Liverpool, England. It shares sixth form facilities with the neighbouring boys' school Cardinal Heenan Catholic High School.

== History ==
Broughton Hall was built in 1860 for Gustavus C. Schaube of Hamburg, a prominent Liverpool merchant and the conservatory was added between 1870 and 1880. Broughton Hall High School was founded in 1928 under the Trusteeship of the Sisters of Mercy. It was previously known as Convent of Mercy Girls' High School.

== Broughton Hall Convent ==
The Broughton Hall Convent is a 19th-century grade II* listed building.

The Sisters of Mercy purchased Broughton Hall in 1925, a former grand mansion in West Derby, as the site for a large school set in extensive grounds. As the school was developed in future years, teaching at the convent became less frequent until teaching was moved completely to the new school buildings. The convent is still home to the Sisters of Mercy.

== Alumnae ==
- Irene Desmet (1928–2020) – paediatric surgeon
- Angela Topping (née Lightfoot) (b. 1954) – poet, author and critic
- Gail McKenna (b. 1968) – glamour model
- Natasha Hamilton (b. 1982) – musician, Atomic Kitten
- Jennifer Ellison (b. 1983) – actress, played Emily Shadwick in Brookside
- Bianca Walkden (b. 1991) – taekwondo competitor
