= River Alt =

River in Merseyside, England

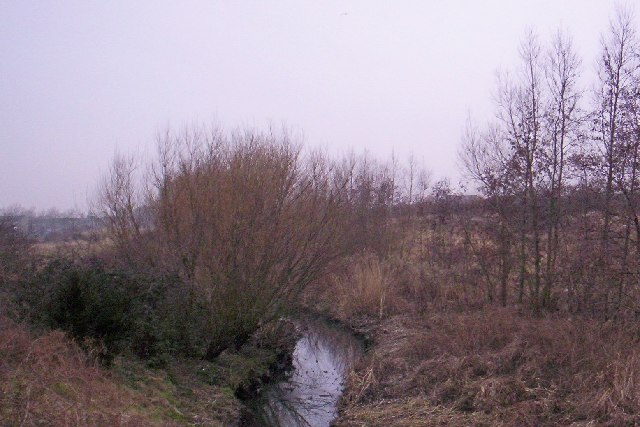
- River Alt in Croxteth

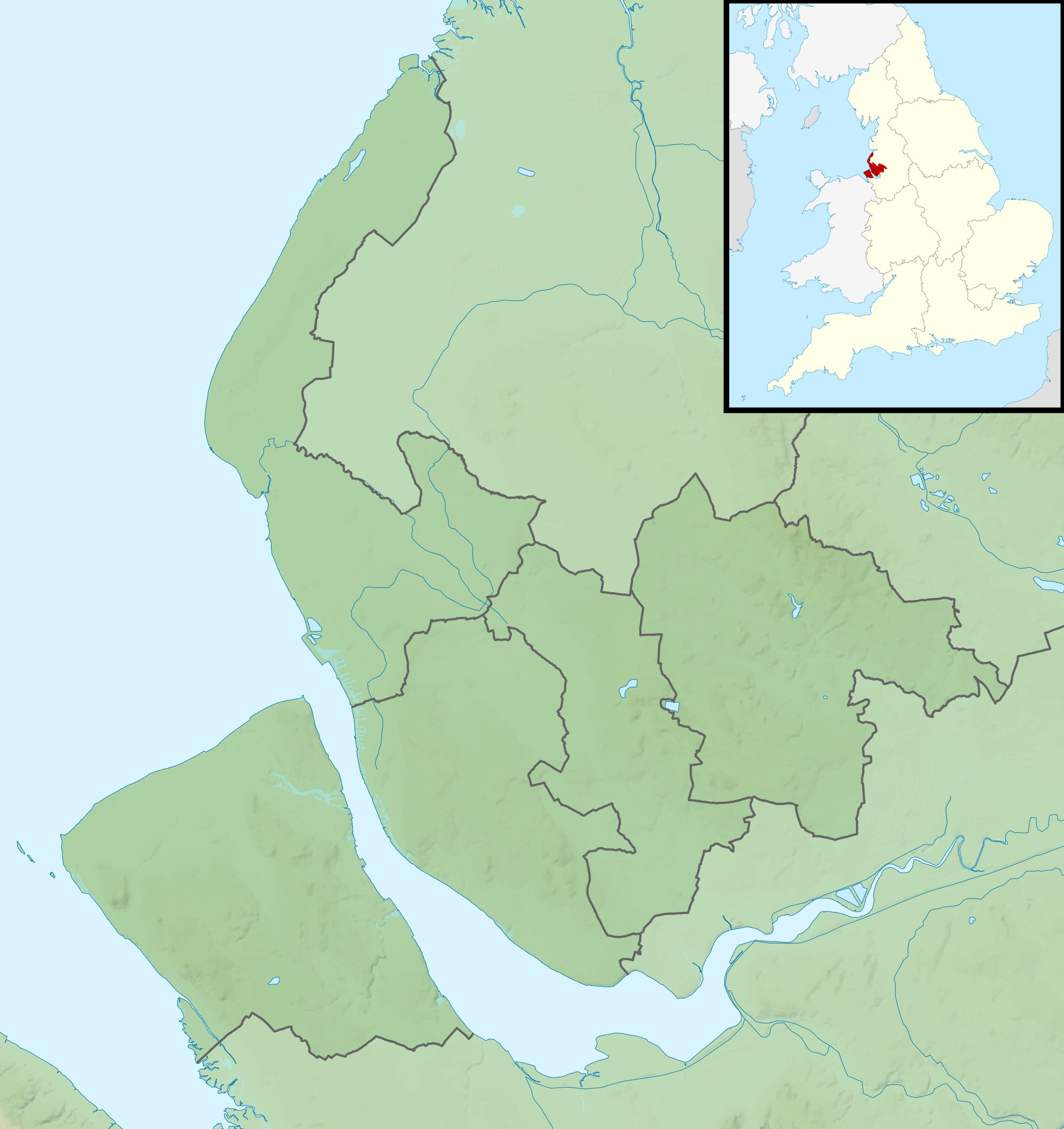
- Location of river mouth (Hightown)

Location
- Country: England
- County: Merseyside
- City: Liverpool

Physical characteristics
- Source
  - coordinates: 53°24′52.6″N 2°49′55.5″W
  - elevation: 98 feet (30 m)
- Mouth
  - coordinates: 53°31′25.1″N 3°03′50.4″W
  - elevation: 0 feet (0 m)
- Length: 17 miles (28 km)
- Basin size: 40 square miles (103 km^{2})
- Discharge
  - average: 105.4 cu ft/s (2.984 m^{3}/s)

The River Alt is an urban river that flows across Merseyside in England. The river has suffered from heavy pollution from industry and sewage upstream and run-off from farmland in its lower reaches. It empties into the River Mersey, near to where the Mersey itself flows into the Irish Sea. The river has benefited from clean-up schemes and a de-culverting process to improve its water quality and provide a better environment for wildlife.

== Etymology ==
The river's name might be of Latin origin (meaning muddy river) but the banks of the river are lined by villages and places with names of Old Norse derivation. The name Alt could also be derived from Brittonic alt, which can either mean 'cliff' or as is more likely in this case, 'burn, mountain stream' (Welsh allt, Irish ált). Thirdly, the obscure Celtic element *al-, suffixed with the Brittonic nominal suffix -ed may underlie this name.

== Route ==
The Alt runs from Hag Plantation in Huyton at 125 ft (38 m), through Croxteth Park, roughly follows the M57 motorway south of Kirkby, then flows north of Aintree and south of Maghull. It then runs south of Formby and empties into the Irish Sea, near the edge of the River Mersey estuary at Hightown.

The Alt's upper waters derive from small streams and, in particular, one arising at Hag Plantation in Huyton. This is the location of the primary source of the river and is also the Huyton Wetlands Site of Biological Interest (SBI). The Alt then flows at a low gradient across an alluvium plain in a northwesterly direction before turning southwards and emptying into the River Mersey at Hightown between Crosby and Formby.

The Alt's catchment boundary reaches as far as Banks and Crossens in the north and out to Burscough and Kirkby in the east. It drains a catchment area of 40 square miles (103 km^{2}) and flows a distance of 17 miles (28 km) from source to the Mersey Estuary.

The river flows through varying types of land: Sherwood Sandstone in the Huyton area, Coal Measures in the West Derby area and eventually Mercia Mudstone in the Maghull/North Sefton area. The estuary forms part of the Ribble and Alt Estuaries Special Protection Area for wildlife.

Before the installation of tidal floodgates at Hightown in the 18th Century, the river was once called a "troublesome little river" its ever changing course cutting through the field boundaries, threatening roads and bridges and was rumoured to have wiped out the hamlet of Altmouth sometime between 1577 and 1713. However, studies of mapping have shown that there was never a village symbol at Altmouth on the maps, although one mapman stated there was a village there, but was unclear as to if it was on the north or south side of the river mouth. Flooding along the river was a problem until the 1960s when work to straighten and canalise the river, plus the opening of pumping stations at Crossens in 1959 and Altmouth in 1972, ended the regular inundation of fields by water from the sources and from the sea. The river downstream of Maghull is rich agricultural land, but 20 square miles (52 km^{2}) of it is below sea level and so requires the pumping stations to prevent tidal incursions into the river. The river was once well known for its fish and large quantities of eels were trapped upstream and in its tributaries. Flatfish like dabs, plaice and flounder were caught in the estuary and the tidal reaches, vast cockle beds were worked in the estuary.

The river began to change in the early 20th century as Liverpool expanded and industry, then new housing began to grow along its banks. By the 1970s, the pollution had affected the river so much, it was listed as being class 3 or 4, which meant that apart from bloodworms, there was no life in the river. Part of this problem lies with when the river was culverted and housing was erected near to and over the river, the wastewater pipes from the dwellings were wrongly connected to discharge their water directly into the river.

New sewage farms at Croxteth and Hillhouse plus modernisation to existing sewage farms and the decrease in heavy industry in Knowsley, Kirkby and Aintree began to clean up the river and by the early 1990s freshwater fish began to colonise the river from tributaries like Sudell Brook and Downholland Brook. By 2000, the river was well known among local anglers for its healthy population of pike, chub, bream, roach and sticklebacks. Herons, kingfishers and, in summer, egrets can often be seen in the water. In 2016, the Environment Agency released 9,000 fish into the river to replenish stocks.

The Alt is still not clean due to its heritage as a handy dumping ground for sewage and industrial waste. Currently it has a moderate ecological rating but a fail rating for chemicals due to heavy metals in its silt. However, in 2006, the amount of wildlife that lived in and around the river earned it a clean bill of health from the Environment Agency.

=== Improvements ===
In 1996, a 460-foot (140 m) long, and a 98-foot (30 m) wide section of the river flowing through Knowsley, was rehabilitated from a straight, narrow stretch of water into a low floodplain where the water would spread out into several courses over the plain. The main channel was diverted and several smaller channels were created by the addition of berms to separate them. This has allowed plants to thrive and offers a floodplain where there was not one before.

In June 2014, a new section of the river was de-culverted and was lengthened through the addition of bends to improve the river's quality and also provide a greenspace for the nearby residents of Croxteth. Initially tied in with a development plan connected with Stonebridge Cross, the 980-foot (300 m) section was opened to daylight to create a meandering riverside that stretched to 2,850-foot (870 m) and would help when the river was in flood as well as improve the area for wildlife.

== Settlements ==
- Hightown
- Formby
- Little Altcar
- Great Altcar
- Ince Blundell
- Maghull
- Aintree
- Melling
- Waddicar
- Kirkby
- Knowsley
- Croxteth
- West Derby
- Huyton

== Tributaries ==
- Downholland Brook
  - New Cut
  - Bull Cop
  - Sandy Brook
    - Old Canal
  - Fine Jane's Brook
  - Leather Barrow's Ditch
    - Cheshire Lines Brook
  - Barton Brook
  - Chisnall Brook
    - Rough Brook
- Arnold's Cop
- Main Sluice
  - Tongue's Watercourse
  - Within's Watercourse
- Lydiate Brook
  - Carr Sluice
- Maghull Hey Cop
  - Carr Sluice
- Hunt's Brook
- Maghull Brook
- St. Helen's Gutter (as the Alt is known between Aintree and Maghull)
- Dover's Brook
  - Whinny Brook
- Harrison's Brook
- Netherton's Brook
- Kirkby Brook
  - Simonswood Brook
- Knowsley Brook
- Tue Brook

== Gallery ==
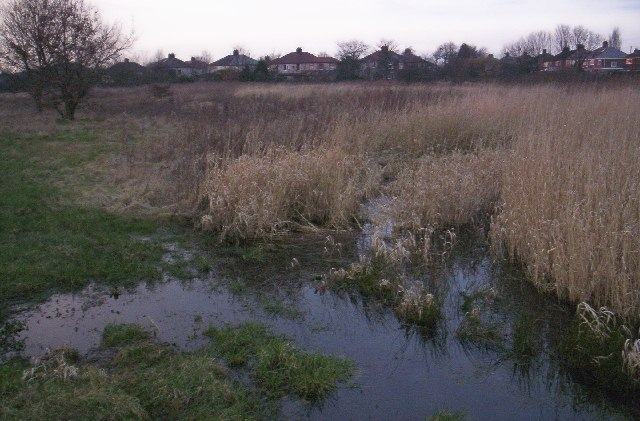
Source of the Alt; wetlands at Huyton

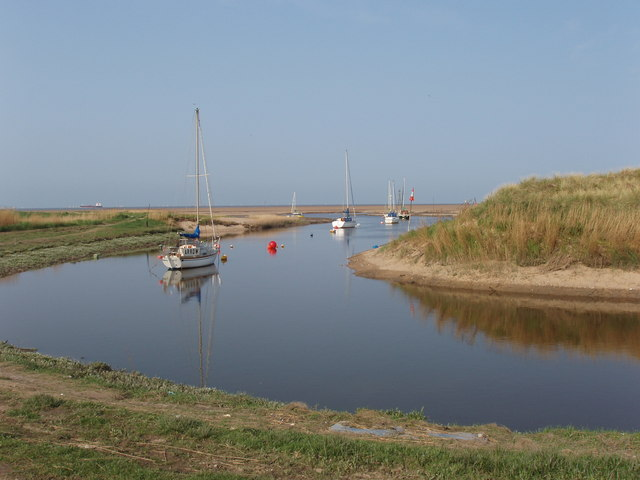
Yachts moored at the mouth of the River Alt

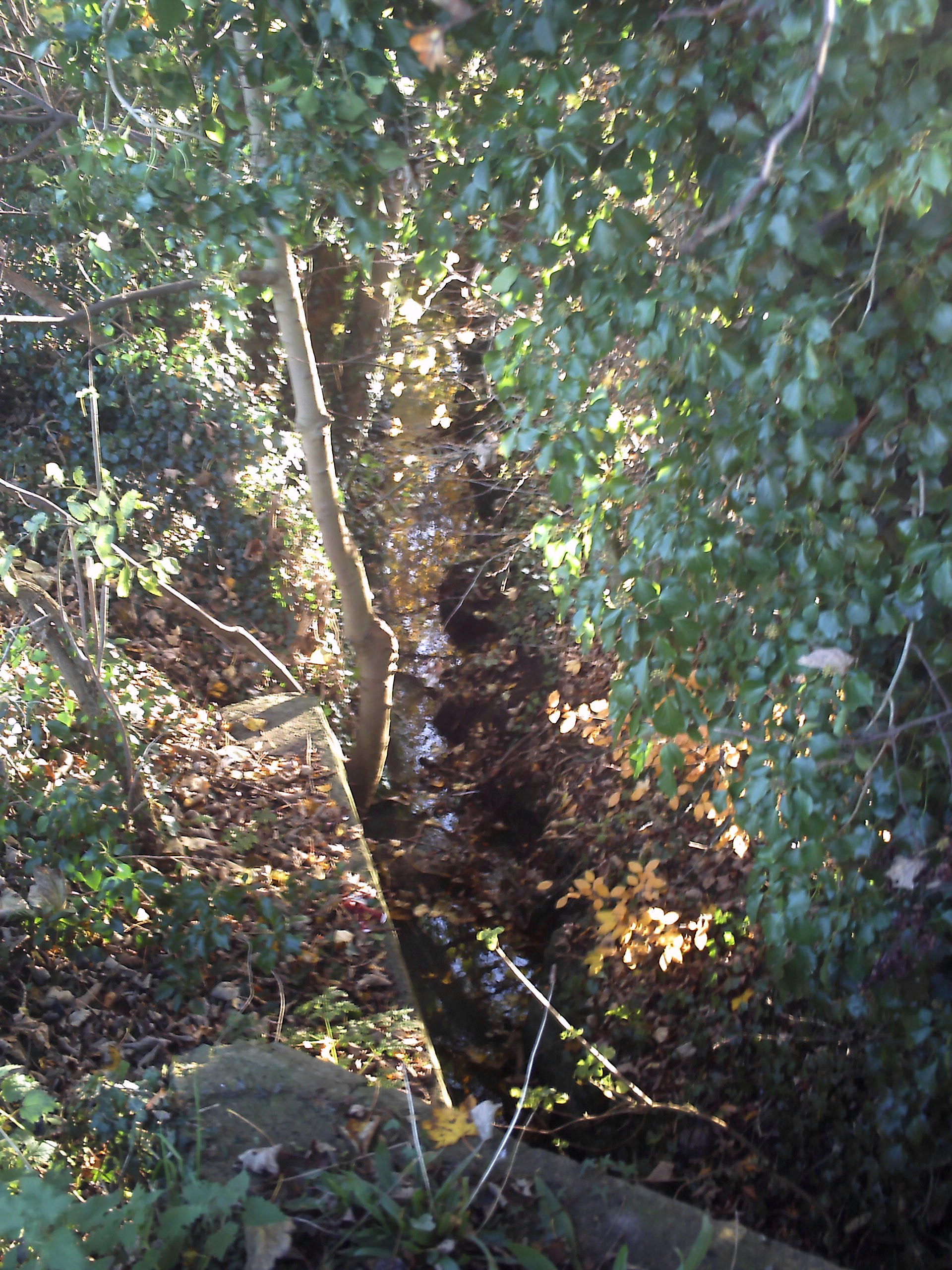
Maghull Brook

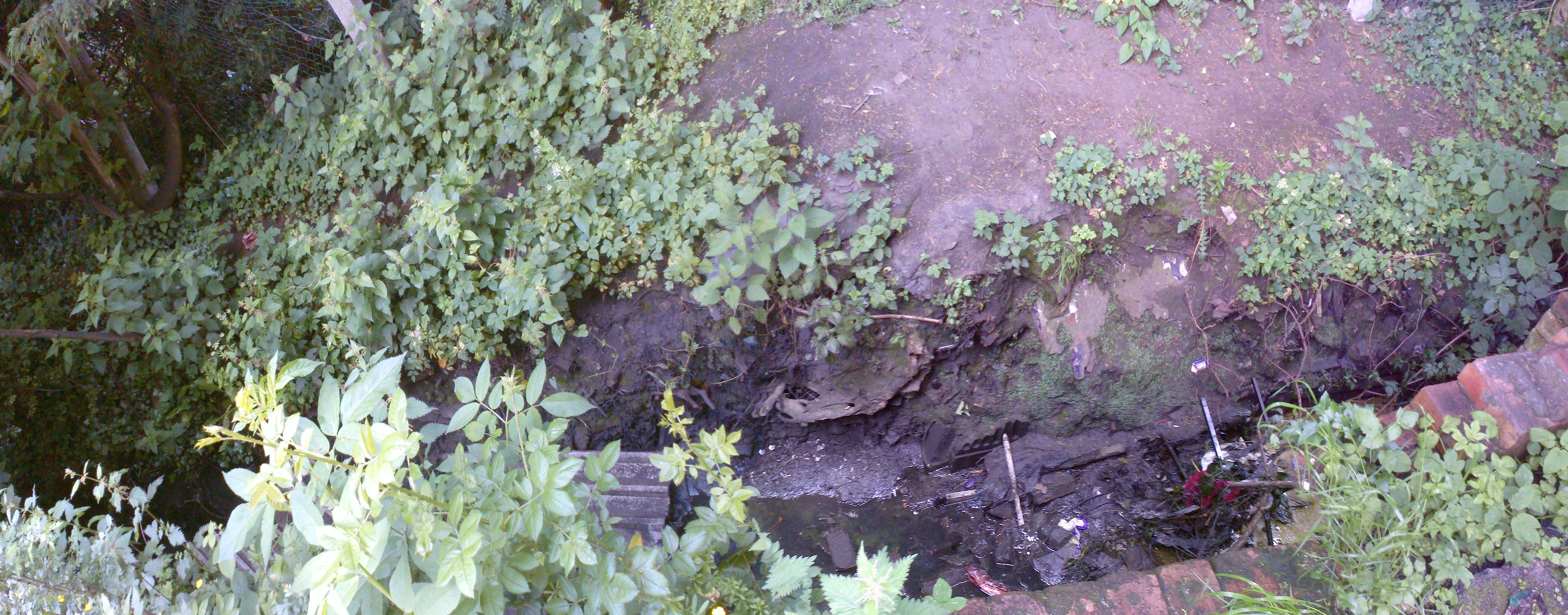
The last open section of the Tue Brook

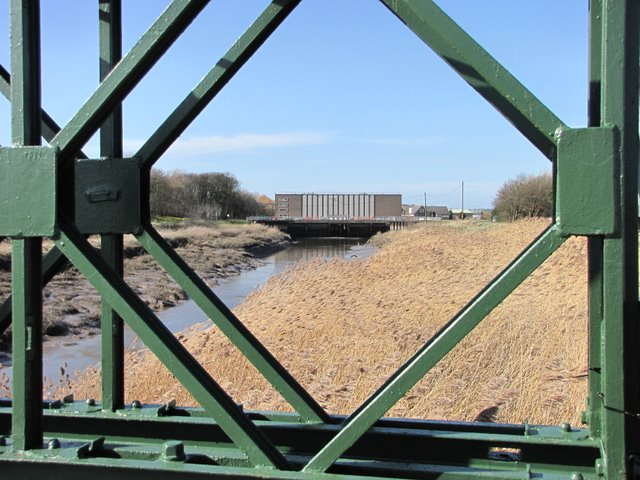
Alt Pumping Station
