= St Paul's Church, West Derby =

Coordinates: 53.4292°N 2.9018°W

- Location in Merseyside
- OS grid reference: SJ 402 929
- Location: Town Row, West Derby, Liverpool, Merseyside
- Country: England
- Denomination: Roman Catholic

History
- Status: Parish church

Architecture
- Functional status: Active
- Heritage designation: Grade II
- Designated: 14 March 1975
- Architect: Pugin and Pugin
- Architectural type: Church
- Style: Gothic Revival
- Groundbreaking: 1914
- Completed: 1915

Specifications
- Materials: Sandstone, slate roof

Administration
- Diocese: Liverpool

Clergy
- Vicar: Revd Sean Kirwin
- Priest: Revd Kieran O'Grady

St Paul's Church is in Town Row, West Derby, a suburb of Liverpool, Merseyside, England. It is an active Roman Catholic parish church in Pastoral Area 5 of the Archdiocese of Liverpool. The church is recorded in the National Heritage List for England as a designated Grade II listed building.

== History ==
The church was built in 1914–15, and designed by Pugin and Pugin. The interior was reordered in 1973–75.

== Architecture ==
=== Exterior ===
St Paul's is built in red sandstone, and has a blue slate roof. Its plan consists of a four-bay nave with a northwest baptistry, north and south aisles, a two-bay chancel with flanking chapels, and a southwest tower. The church is designed in a free Perpendicular style. The tower is short, with irregularly-placed stair windows, two four-light bell openings, and a cornice. It is surmounted by a steep pyramidal slated roof. On the west front are two pointed entrances, flanked by buttresses, with a niche containing a statue above them. Over this are two lancet windows and a higher four-light window. Along the sides of the church are four cross-gables, each with a three-light window below. The east end of the chancel is canted, with two-light windows containing Geometric tracery. In the chapels are two-light north and south windows.

=== Interior ===
Inside the church the arcades are carried on round columns with moulded capitals. There is a west gallery, beneath which is a narthex. The marble and alabaster fittings were designed by Pugin and Pugin. During the reordering the reredos was cut down, the altar, which contain mosaic inlays, was brought forward, and the pulpit was converted into a lectern.

== See also ==
- Grade II listed buildings in Liverpool-L12
