= Downholland Brook =

River in Merseyside, England

Coordinates: 53°32′35″N 3°02′48″W

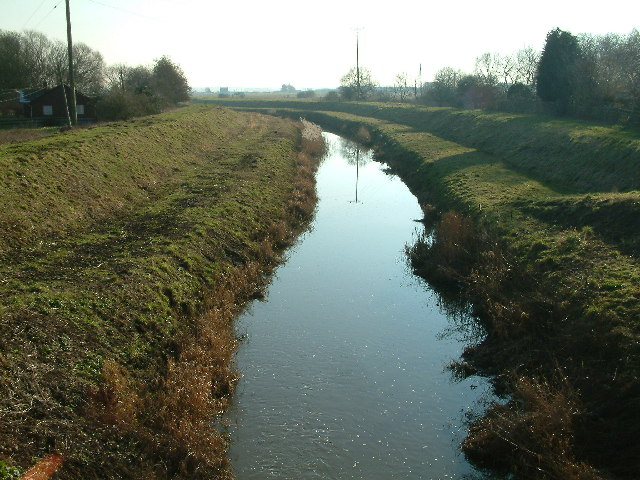
Downholland Brook in Moss Side, looking south

Downholland Brook is a 4.3-kilometre-long (2.7 mi) river (brook) in Merseyside, England, that is a tributary to the River Alt in the Alt catchment. Rising from Barton Brook in the West Lancashire parish of Downholland, the river flows a westerly course until reaching Moss Side, Formby, when it turns south towards Little Altcar in the Metropolitan Borough of Sefton. There, it flows into the River Alt.

== Water quality ==
Water quality of the brook in 2019, according to the Environment Agency, a non-departmental public body sponsored by the United Kingdom's Department for Environment, Food and Rural Affairs:

Section	Ecological Status	Chemical Status	Length	Catchment
Downholland Brook	Moderate	Fail	4.331 km (2.691 mi)	16.667 km^{2} (6.435 sq mi)
