= Kirkby Brook =

River in Merseyside, England

Coordinates: 53°28′15″N 2°54′23″W

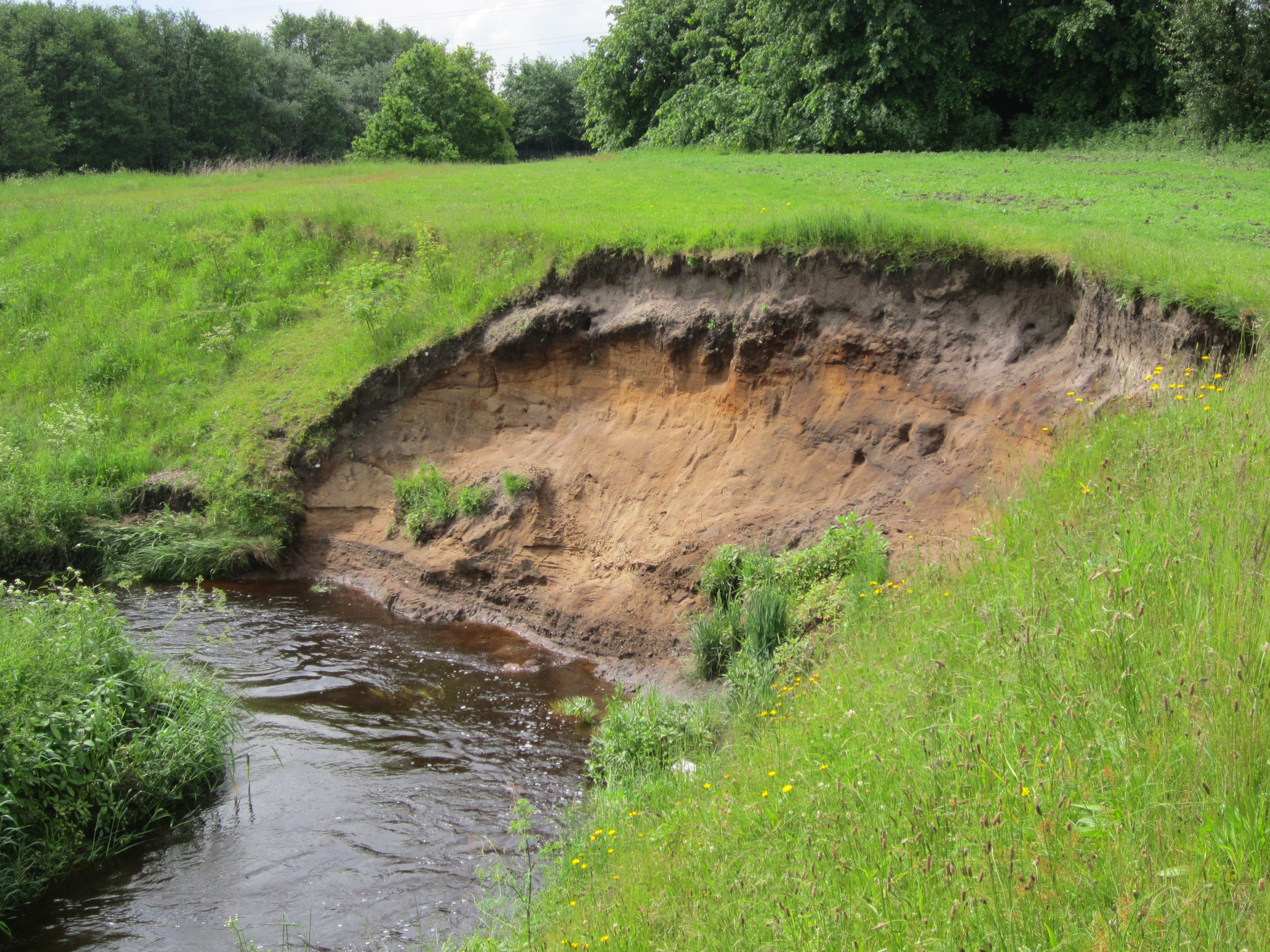
Kirkby Brook, near Valley Road

Kirkby Brook is the name for Simonswood Brook in Kirkby, a minor river (brook) in Merseyside, England, that is a tributary to the River Alt in the Alt catchment. It is located entirely within the town of Kirkby in the Metropolitan Borough of Knowsley.

Rising from Simonswood Brook as it enters the town of Kirkby near St Chad's Church, Kirkby, Kirkby Brook flows southward until reaching Littlebrook Lane, when it turns southwest before finally flowing into the River Alt by Lime Tree Woods.

In 2016, the number and diversity of invertebrates was rated as "poor" by the Environment Agency, a non-departmental public body sponsored by the United Kingdom's Department for Environment, Food and Rural Affairs.
