= Maghull Brook =

River in Merseyside, England

Coordinates: 53°30′56″N 2°58′22″W

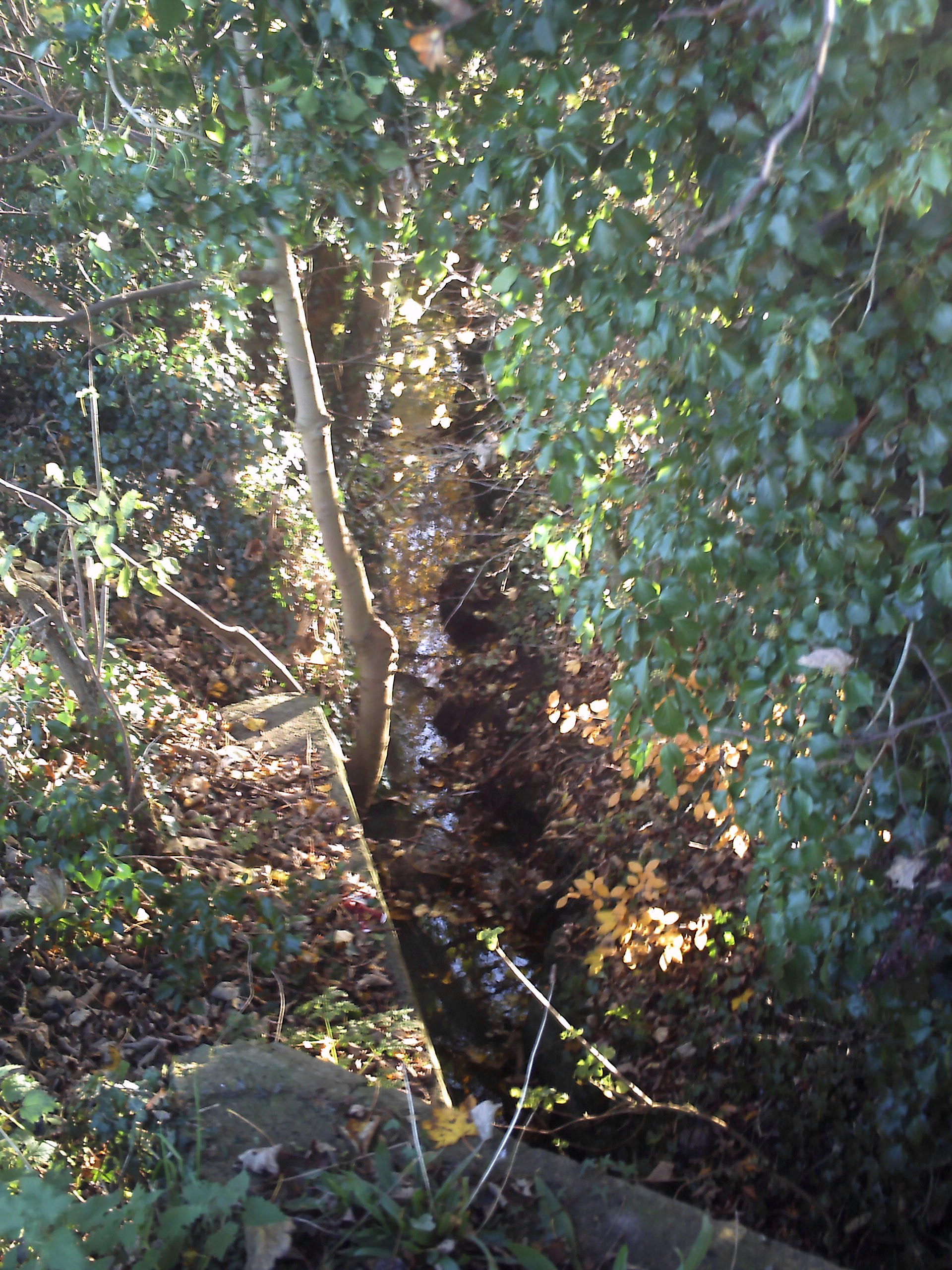
Maghull Brook

Maghull Brook is a minor river (brook) in Merseyside, England, that is a tributary to the River Alt in the Alt catchment. Located entirely in the Metropolitan Borough of Sefton, Maghull Brook forms the boundary between the civil parishes of Maghull and Lydiate.

Rising from the Leeds and Liverpool Canal, the brook flows a westerly course until reaching a neighbourhood, Mercer Court, near Bell's Lane, when it flows south. After about 0.45 km (0.27 mi), it resumes its westerly course and flows into the River Alt.
