= Bellefield, Liverpool =

Everton FC's former training ground

Bellefield
- Interactive map of Bellefield
- Location: West Derby, Liverpool
- Coordinates: 53.427503°N 2.907274°W

Construction
- Built: 1945
- Demolished: March 2011

Bellefield, in West Derby, Liverpool, is Everton FC's former training ground.

Bellefield had been Everton FC's training ground since 1946. It was purchased in 1965 and officially opened on 12 July 1966.

The Brazil national football team used it as a training base in the 1966 World Cup.

On Tuesday, 9 October 2007, Bellefield training ground held its last senior first team training session and moved to Finch Farm in Halewood a day later.

== Bellefield's future ==
Having vacated Bellefield to the new training ground, Everton's plans were to have the Bellefield estate redeveloped for housing, which would in turn contribute financially to a proposed new club stadium. As reported in the Liverpool Daily Post on 11 June 2008 Liverpool councillors rejected Everton's plans.
