= Angela Topping =

English poet and critic, born 1954

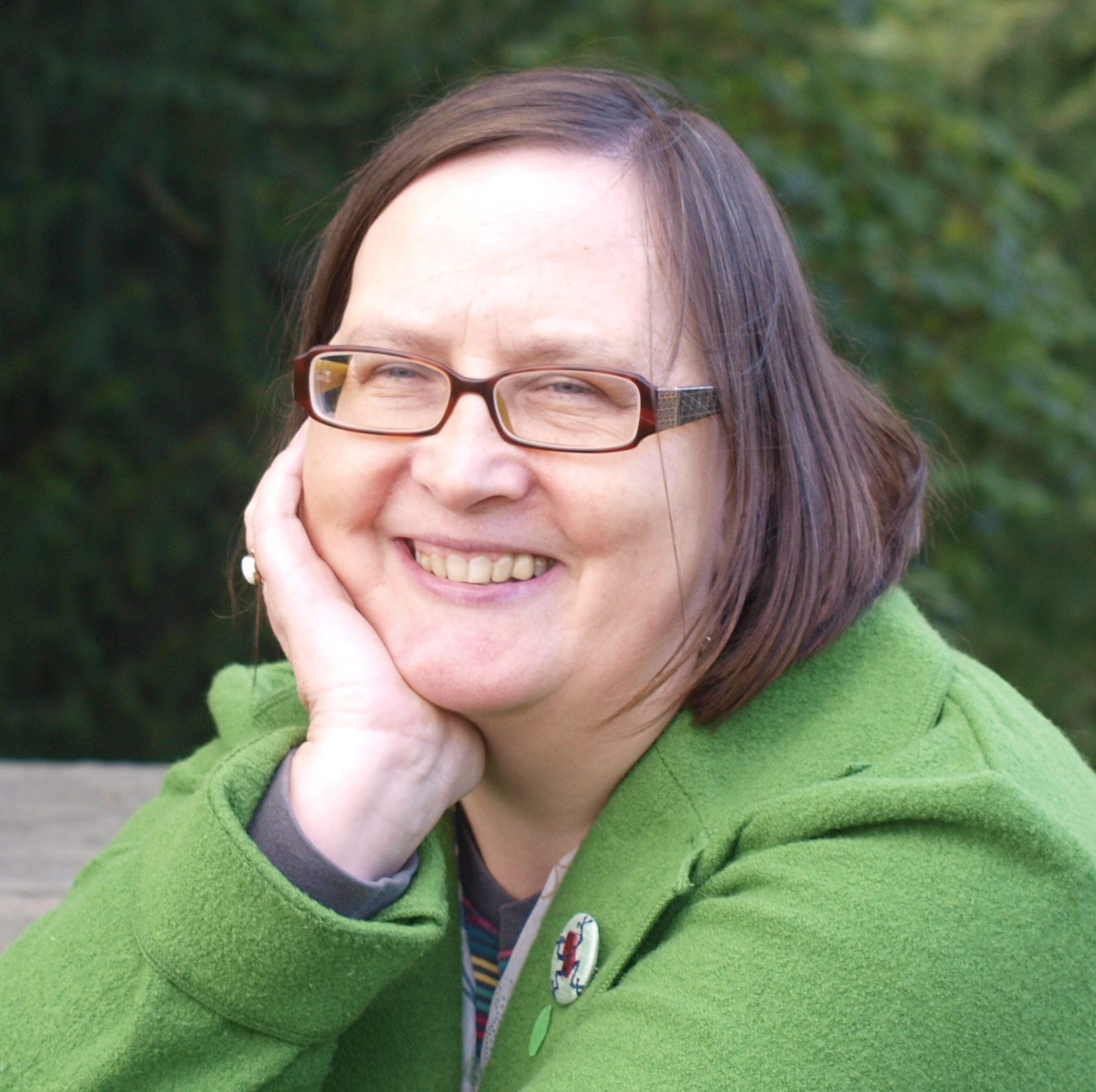
- Born: October 2, 1954 (age 72)
- Occupations: Poet, literary critic, author

Angela Topping (born 2 October 1954) is an English poet, literary critic and author. She has published nine solo poetry collections: Dandelions for Mothers' Day (1988, 1989), The Fiddle (1999), The Way We Came (2007), The New Generation (Salt 2010), I Sing of Bricks (Salt 2011), Paper Patterns (Lapwing 2012), Letting Go (Mother's Milk Press 2013), The Five Petals of Elderflower (Red Squirrel Press 2016) and Earwig Country (Valley Press 2024)

== Life and writings ==
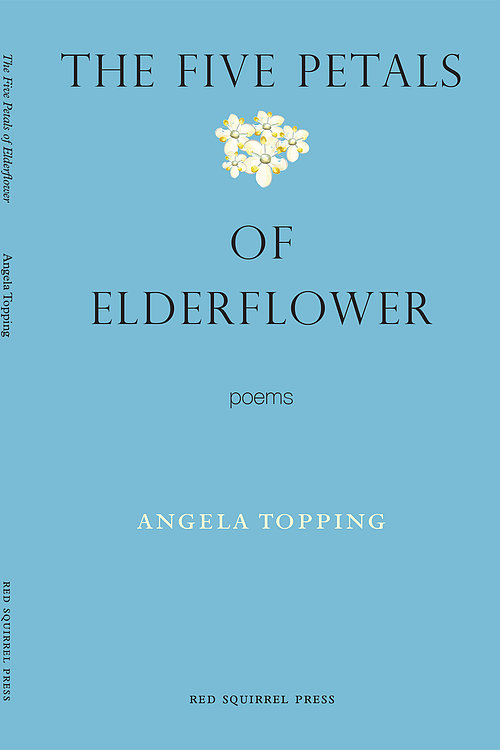

Topping (nee Lightfoot) was born in Widnes, Lancashire (now Cheshire), to working-class parents. She was educated in Liverpool at Broughton Hall Grammar School for Girls. After graduating from the University of Liverpool with a degree in English and Classical Civilization, she went on to study for a postgraduate degree in Victorian Studies. Although writing from a young age (she first published poetry at the age of 19 in Arts Alive Merseyside), Topping got married and raised two daughters while writing her first two collections and editing two poetry anthologies. The first of these was a collection of Christian writing, and the second a festschrift for the Liverpool-based poet Matt Simpson, including works by U. A. Fanthorpe, Anne Stevenson, Roger McGough and Kenneth Muir.

After working in education for 20 years, including at Upton Hall School FCJ, Topping now concentrates full-time on writing and has written several critical works for the publisher Greenwich Exchange.

In 2010, Topping teamed up with textile artist Maria Walker. Together they produced a joint exhibition of work based on The Lightfoot Letters, which were family epistles from 1923, which by coincidence had been written by Angela's father's family and purchased by Maria from an antique shop several years before she met Angela. The exhibition was first staged at The Brindley in 2011 and has since been shown in other galleries in the North West, as well as Stanza, the Scottish International Poetry Festival, in 2014.

Topping has had writing in anthologies, such as Split Screen, edited by Andy Jackson and published by Red Squirrel (2012), and Troubles Swapped for Something Fresh (Salt 2009) edited by Rupert Loydell. One of her poems appeared on National Poetry Day poem cards in 2012. Her children's poems have appeared in over 80 anthologies. In 2011 she was the only poet highly commended in the Cheshire High Sherriff's Prize for Children's Literature. In 2013, she was writer-in-residence at Gladstone's Library and won first prize in Buzzwords competition, judged by David Morley. In 2018, she was awarded first prize in the Waltraud Field Poetry Competition.

== Publications ==
=== Poetry collections ===
- Dandelions for Mothers' Day (Stride, 1988 and 1989)
- The Fiddle: New and Selected Poems (Stride, 1999)
- The Way We Came (Bluechrome, 2007)
- The New Generation (Salt, 2010) – children's poetry
- I Sing of Bricks (Salt Modern Voices, 2011)
- Catching On, an elegiac sequence for Matt Simpson (Rack Press, 2011)
- Kids' Stuff (Erbacce, 2011) – children's poetry
- The Lightfoot Letters (for a joint exhibition of textile art with Maria Walker, Erbacce, 2011)
- Paper Patterns (Lapwing, 2012)
- Letting Go (Mother's Milk Books, 2013)
- Hearth (with poet Sarah James, Mother's Milk Books, 2015)
- The Five Petals of Elderflower (Red Squirrel Press, 2016)
- Earwig Country (Valley Press 2024)

=== Critical works ===
- Focus on Spies by Michael Frayn (Greenwich Exchange, 2008)
- Focus on The Bloody Chamber and Other Stories by Angela Carter (Greenwich Exchange, 2009)
- Focus on Selected Poems by John Clare – Everyman Edition, (2015)

=== Editions ===
- The Least Thing (foreword by George Szirtes, Stride, 1989)
- Making Connections, a Festschrift for Matt Simpson (Stride, 1996)
- Manchester Poets Competition Anthologies I and II
- Brando's Hat editorial board
- Co-editor of The Robin Hood Book (Poets against Austerity) with Alan Morrison (Caparison, 2012)
- Co-editor of Sculpted, Poetry of the North West with Lindsey Holland (NWP 2013)
- Pamphlets inspired by Austen, Bronte and Shakespeare (Like this Press 2014), titled Advice on Proposals, The Scratching of Pens, Acid Tongue and Sweet Breast.
