= Simonswood Brook =

River in Merseyside, England

Coordinates: 53°28′15″N 2°54′23″W

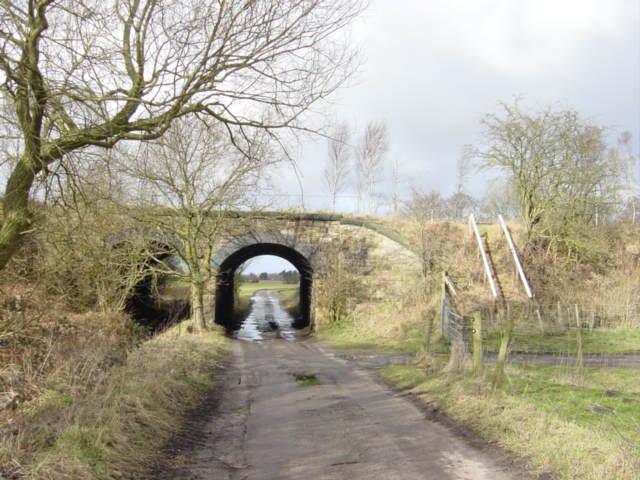
Simonswood Brook (left culvert) flowing under a railway bridge of the Kirkby branch line

Simonswood Brook is a minor, 12-kilometre-long (7.5 mi) river (brook) in Merseyside, England, that is a tributary to the River Alt in the Alt catchment. As the stream enters Kirkby, it is known as the Kirkby Brook.

== Course ==
Rising from Blackburn's Plantation in the Metropolitan Borough of St Helens, Simonswood Brook flows west into the Liverpool City Region, where it proceeds to flow a northwesterly course. After flowing under the Kirkby branch line via a culvert, Simonswood Brook briefly turns west before continuing its northwesterly course through Simonswood. It then flows into the Metropolitan Borough of Sefton and turns south through Melling Mount and finally into Kirkby in the Metropolitan Borough of Knowsley, near St Chad's Church, where it is then known as the Kirkby Brook and flows into the River Alt.

== Water quality ==
Water quality of the brook in 2019, according to the Environment Agency, a non-departmental public body sponsored by the United Kingdom's Department for Environment, Food and Rural Affairs:

Section	Ecological Status	Chemical Status	Length	Catchment
Simonswood Brook	Moderate	Fail	12 km (7.5 mi)	31.504 km^{2} (12.164 sq mi)
