= Thomas Stubbs (cricketer, born 1872) =

English cricketer

Personal information
- Full name: Thomas Alfred Stubbs
- Born: 13 March 1872; West Derby, Lancashire, England
- Died: Unknown
- Batting: Unknown

Career statistics
Competition	First-class
Matches	4
Runs scored	168
Batting average	24.00
100s/50s	–/–
Top score	43
Balls bowled	–
Wickets	–
Bowling average	–
5 wickets in innings	–
10 wickets in match	–
Best bowling	–
Catches/stumpings	2/–
- Source: Cricinfo, 24 October 2015

Thomas Alfred Stubbs (13 March 1872 – date of death unknown) was an English cricketer active in first-class cricket from 1893–1894, making four appearances as a batsman.

Having played club cricket in Liverpool for Sefton and Sefton Park in the early 1890s, Stubbs made his debut in first-class cricket when he was selected to play for the Liverpool and District cricket team in 1893 against Yorkshire at Aigburth. He made a further appearance in 1893 against the touring Australians, before playing twice more against Yorkshire and Cambridge University in 1894. He scored a total of 168 runs in his four matches, averaging 24.00, with a high score of 43, which he made against Cambridge University.
