= Irene Desmet =

English paediatric surgeon (1928–2020)

Irene Marion Desmet FRCS (née Irving; 25 March 1928 – 5 March 2020) was an eminent English paediatric and neonatal surgeon. She lived and worked in Liverpool for her whole life, and was a consultant surgeon at Alder Hey Children's Hospital.

== Early life ==
Irene Irving was born in Liverpool in 1928 to George Stanley Irving, a chemical engineer, and Mary Ellen Irving (née Stockley). She attended Broughton Hall High School and then studied medicine at the University of Liverpool. At university, she was inspired by her friends who had previously served in the Royal Air Force to learn to fly, and gained her pilot's licence in 1948. She graduated from Liverpool with an MB ChB in 1952.

== Career ==
Irving held house posts at the Liverpool Royal Infirmary, before becoming a senior house officer at Alder Hey Children's Hospital, where she worked with Peter Paul Rickham and Isabella Forshall, two of the founders of paediatric surgery. After completing her general surgical training at the David Lewis Northern Hospital in 1957, becoming a Fellow of the Royal College of Surgeons of England, she was inspired by Forshall to pursue further training as a paediatric surgeon.

In 1960 she married Louis Desmet, a former Belgian oyster farmer who later ran a hotel in Liverpool, and they had three children shortly afterwards. While her children were young, she worked as a clinical assistant at Alder Hey and Birkenhead Children's Hospital and completed a ChM in 1969. After Louis died of cancer in 1973, Irene raised their three children (then aged 12, 10 and 9) while working full-time. She became a consultant paediatric surgeon at Alder Hey and a lecturer with the University of Liverpool in 1974. In 1978, she co-authored the textbook Rickham's Neonatal Surgery.

Desmet's approach was admired by patients, nurses and junior doctors; she was described by one of her registrars as "an iron fist in a velvet glove". She described her own career as such: "I feel that my real claim to fame is that of having managed to combine the careers of motherhood and surgery."

== Later life ==
Desmet retired in 1986 after being diagnosed with two separate cancers. She died on 5 March 2020.
