= Finch Farm =

Association football training ground

- School of Science
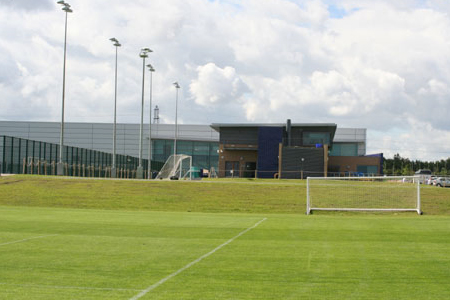
- Everton FC's training complex
- Interactive map of Finch Farm
- Address: Finch Lane, Halewood, Merseyside, L26 3UE
- Coordinates: 53°21′29″N 2°48′48″W
- Owner: Liverpool City Council
- Type: Football Training Complex
- Events: Everton u-18 Everton Men's Pan-Disability Team; Everton Men's Deaf Team

Construction
- Built: 2006
- Opened: 9 October 2007 (open 19 years)
- Cost: £14-17m

Website
- evertonfc.com

Finch Farm is the training ground for Everton F.C., in Halewood, in the Metropolitan Borough of Knowsley, Merseyside within the Liverpool City Region.

The School of Science is the nickname given to the complex by some supporters, referring to a long-standing nickname for the club. The training ground houses both the Everton men and women's first team and the youth academy. The first team squad officially moved to the complex on 9 October 2007, some time behind the target date of pre-season. Plans were drawn up for the Cheshire County Council owned site in 2002.

== Background ==
Everton originally tried to find land in Liverpool but eventually settled on the 55-acre (220,000 m^{2}) site, off Higher Road and Finch Lane in Halewood. Some Halewood residents fought the plans as the training complex and academy was built on greenbelt land.

Finch Farm was acquired in 2006 by Everton who later sold the land on for £2.1 million and then had it developed to the club's specification by developers ROM Capital (an arm of the aAim Group) who as of March 2010 are known as Hudson Capital Properties.

Finch Farm was designed by North-West-based architects AFL. The contract was valued at £9million. A site worker was killed during the final stages of development.

On completion, Finch Farm was valued by ROM Capital at £17 m. Everton signed a 50-year tenancy agreement with ROM Capital for Finch Farm. Everton have an option to purchase the site every 5 years.

Between the 2006/07 and 2007/08 financial accounts' "Other Operating Costs" increased significantly from £11.7m to £21.1m. The club largely attributed this rise to Finch Farm in the club's Financial Review in the annual report:

"Further significant increases in operating costs were also incurred in the year following the opening of the new Finch Farm training facility. The additional operating costs compared with those incurred at Bellefield are seen as a necessary investment to provide the appropriate training facilities required by both first team players and academy players at a Premier League club of Everton's standing."

In October 2011, Hudson Capital Properties put Finch Farm on sale, the asking price was £15.3million. It was sold in May 2013 to Liverpool City Council for £12.9million.

On 8 July 2016, Liverpool City Council announced that £4m will be spent on improvements on the training grounds.

== Structure and facilities ==
The facility features 10 full-size grass pitches on three plateaus, one of which is a floodlit along with an additional floodlit synthetic pitch and specialist training areas for fitness work and goalkeepers, as well as an exact recreation of the pitch at Goodison Park. Inside the training complex there are changing facilities for both the senior squad and the Academy players. The facilities include a gym, synthetic indoor training pitch, hydrotherapy pools, spa, sauna, and physiotherapy rooms, as well as a media centre and video editing suite.
