= Broughton Hall, Merseyside =

Listed building in Liverpool, England

Broughton Hall
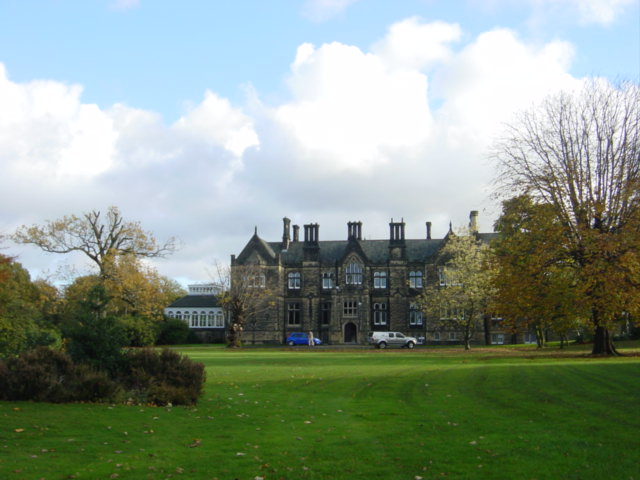
- Broughton Hall in 2005

General information
- Architectural style: Gothic Revival
- Address: Yew Tree Lane, West Derby, Liverpool, England
- Coordinates: 53°25′29″N 2°53′10″W
- Year(s) built: 1860
- Client: Gustav C. Schwabe
- Designations

Listed Building – Grade II*
- Official name: Broughton Hall
- Designated: 14 March 1975
- Reference no.: 1063760

Broughton Hall is a Gothic Revival house at Yew Tree Lane in West Derby, Liverpool, England. It was built in 1860 for Gustav Christian Schwabe, a Liverpool merchant originating from Hamburg, Germany. The conservatory added between 1870 and 1880 is of special interest. The hall was Grade II* listed in 1975.

The house was used as a preparatory school run by Roman Catholic nuns, but now Broughton Hall High School is an all-girls Roman Catholic comprehensive school with boys in the sixth form.

== See also ==
- Grade II* listed buildings in Liverpool – Suburbs
