= Cardinal Heenan Catholic High School =

Boys school in Liverpool, Merseyside, England

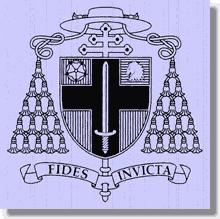
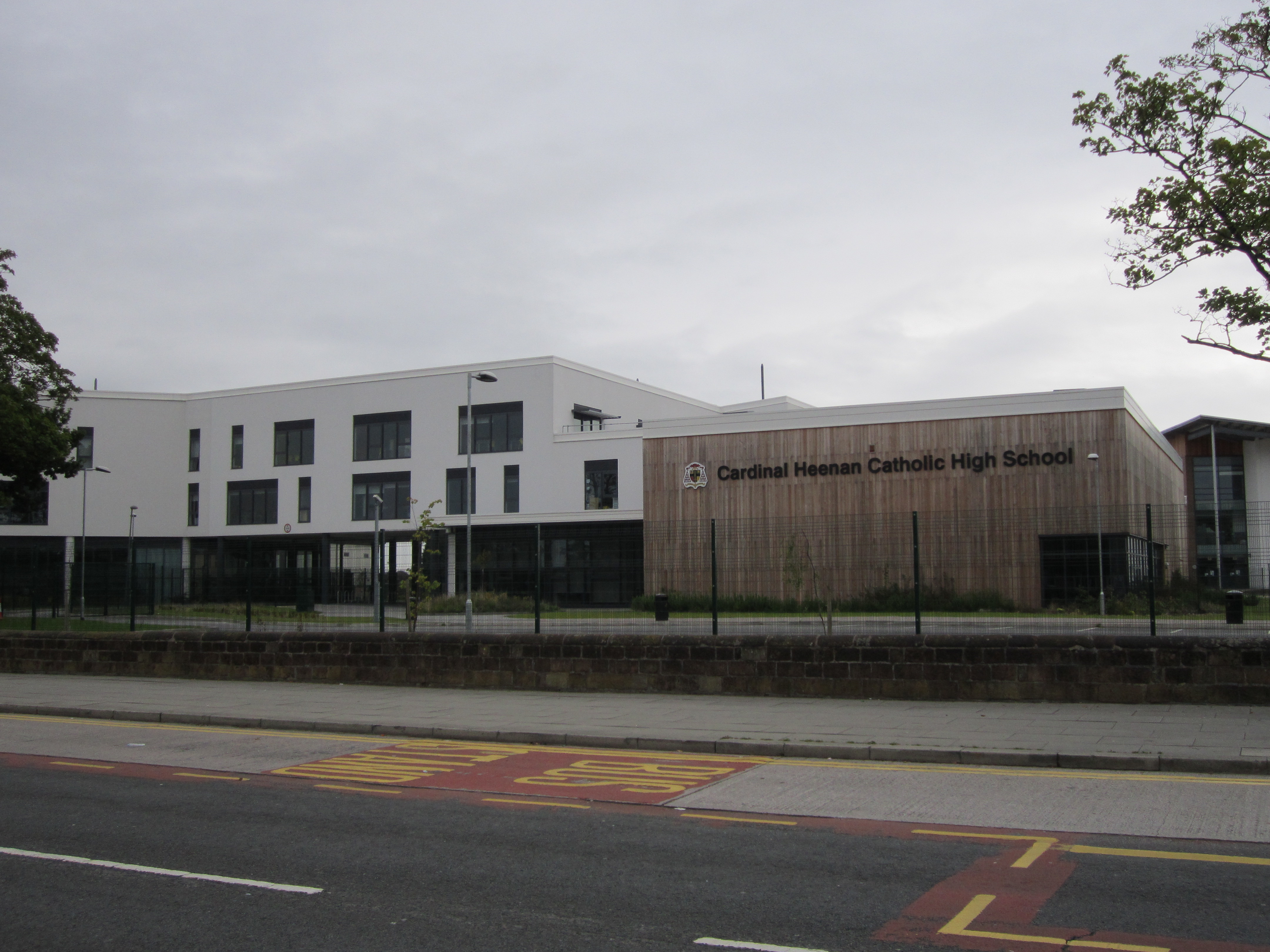
- School badge Cardinal Heenan Catholic High School on Honey's Green Lane

Location
- Honeysgreen Lane; Liverpool, Merseyside, L12 9HZ; England; 53.423481°N 2.889927°W

Information
- Type: 11–18 boys Voluntary aided school
- Motto: `Respect, Believe, Achieve`
- Religious affiliation: Roman Catholic
- Established: 1958
- Local authority: Liverpool City Council
- Department for Education URN: 104714 Tables
- Ofsted: Reports
- Chair: A Tremarco
- Headteacher: K Smyth
- Gender: Boys
- Age: 11 to 18
- Enrolment: 1,389 (2021)
- Former name: Cardinal Allen R.C. Grammar School (Boys)
- Diocese: Liverpool
- Website: Cardinal Heenan

The Cardinal Heenan Catholic High School is an 11–18 boys comprehensive school and sixth form for boys located in West Derby, Liverpool, England. As of September 2021, a total of 1,389 boys were enrolled at the Cardinal Heenan Catholic High School.

It shares sixth form facilities with the neighbouring girls' school Broughton Hall High School.

== History ==
The school is named after Cardinal John Carmel Heenan. Until 1983 it was known as Cardinal Allen Grammar School, when it merged with St Margaret Mary's Boys' School. It opened in September 1958 with around 300 boys when administered by the Liverpool Education Committee. Next door was the Convent of Mercy High School, a girls' grammar school on Yew Tree Lane which was later renamed Broughton Hall High School.

The school was originally based at two sites, one for Year 7 and 8 (years 1 and 2 of the old school year system) around half a mile (800m) from the main building on Pilch Lane, Huyton. The upper school, now the only building, is based at Honeysgreen Lane, West Derby.

== Overview ==
=== Curriculum ===
Boys attending the school are taught across three different Key Stages ― Key Stage 3, Key Stage 4 and Key Stage 5. Boys in Years 7―9 are taught at Key Stage 3, Years 10―11 are taught Key Stage 4, and boys in Years 12―13 are taught at Key Stage 5.

Boys in Year 7 at the school are taught subjects including English Language and Literature, Mathematics, Science, Religious Education, Geography, History, Modern Foreign Languages, Computing, Art, Drama, Music, Design and Technology, Food and Physical Education, with additional opportunities to develop leadership in areas such as Careers, Charity and Community Service, and Spiritual Formation. Boys in Year 8 follow the same subjects and leadership development courses, with the addition of Personal, Social and Health Education (PSHE) commencing in Year 8.

Boys in Year 9 have the option to study Media as a subject, and follow the same leadership development programmes which commenced in Year 8. Boys in Year 10 have the opportunity to study a Travel & Tourism Tech Award, as well as having the opportunity to study Computer Science, "iMedia", Drama at GCSE level, 3D Design and Technology, Hospitality and Catering, Health and Social Care, and Business.

=== Academic attainment ===
The school has a well below average Progress 8 score, a score provided to schools by the government based on the academic progress that pupils make from the end of Key Stage 2 to the end of Key Stage 4. Such scores are based on 8 qualifications from pupils at each school. The percentage of boys entering the "English Baccalaureate" (entered for examination in English, Maths, Science, a foreign language, and either History or Geography), stood at 15%, below the local authority average of 34% and the England average of 39%. The school's percentage of boys who attained a Grade 5 award in English and Maths at GCSE level was just below the local authority average (37%), at 34%, and below the England average of 45%.

The schools Attainment 8 score, based on the performance of pupils in up to 8 qualifications, stood at 41.4%, just below the local authority average of 41.7%, and the England average of 46.2%. Despite this, the school performed strongly in the number of boys either staying in education or entering employment upon leaving the school, with 95% either staying in education or taking employment, compares to the local authority average of 92% and the England average of 94%.

== Notable alumni ==
Carl Reigler (b. 1992) - Semi Professional Comedian and Podcaster

- Joey Molland (b. 1947) – musician, Badfinger
- Ian Hart (b. 1964) – actor
- Steven Gerrard (b. 1980) – footballer, Liverpool F.C., England national football team, football manager
- Bradley Orr (b. 1982) – footballer, Blackburn Rovers F.C.
- David Price (b. 1983) – boxer
- John Welsh (b. 1984) – footballer, Hull City F.C., England under-21
- Sean Doherty (b. 1985) – footballer
- Jay McEveley (b. 1985) – footballer, Derby County F.C., Scotland national football team
- David Nugent (b. 1985) – footballer, Portsmouth F.C., England national football team.
- Carl Tremarco (b. 1985) – footballer, Wrexham F.C.
- Adam Rowe (b. 1992) – comedian and podcaster
- Tyias Browning (b. 1994) – footballer, Everton F.C.
- Paddy Pimblett (b. 1995) – mixed martial arts fighter
- Liam Walsh (b. 1997) – footballer, Everton F.C., Luton Town F.C.
- Callum Wright (b. 2000) – footballer, Plymouth Argyle F.C.
- Bobby Duncan (b. 2001) – footballer
- Mike Di Scala – music producer
- Colin Harvey (b. 1944) – footballer,Everton F.C., Sheffield Wednesday F.C., England national football team
- Paul McGann (b. 1959) – actor
- Michael Caulder (b.1957) – rugby player, USA Eagles 1st World Cup
