= West Derby =

Area of Liverpool, England

Coordinates: 53.4338°N 2.9070°W

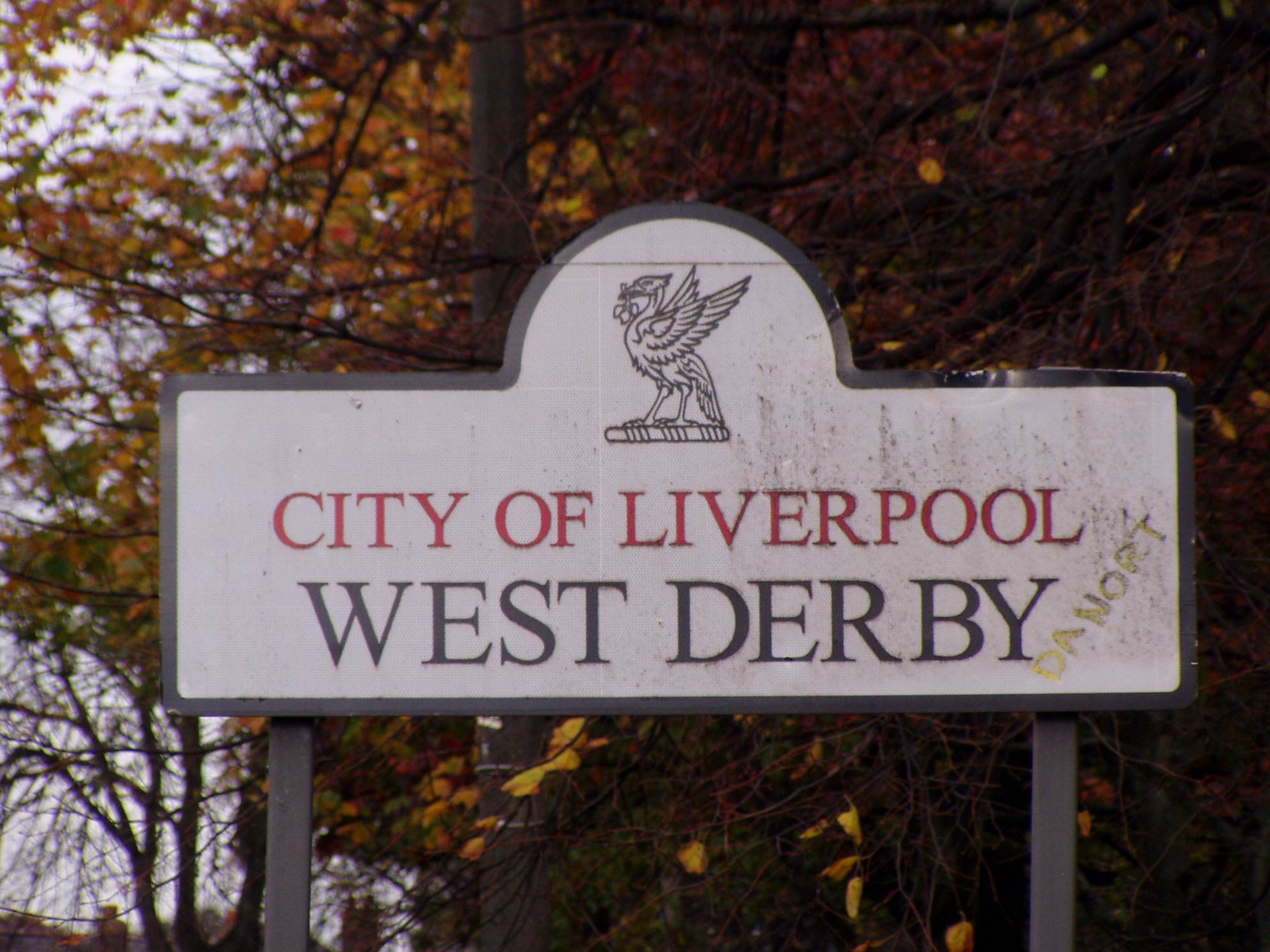
- West Derby district sign

- Location within Merseyside
- Population: 14,382 (2011 Census)
- OS grid reference: SJ396932
- Metropolitan borough: Liverpool
- Metropolitan county: Merseyside
- Region: North West
- Country: England
- Sovereign state: United Kingdom
- Post town: LIVERPOOL
- Postcode district: L12
- Dialling code: 0151
- Police: Merseyside
- Fire: Merseyside
- Ambulance: North West
- UK Parliament: Liverpool West Derby

West Derby (/ˈdɑːrbi/ DAR-bee) is an area of Liverpool, Merseyside, England, in the east of the city. In the 2011 Census, the population was 14,382.

== History ==
=== West Derby ===
Mentioned in the Domesday Book, West Derby achieved significance far earlier than Liverpool itself. The name West Derby comes from an Old Norse word meaning "place of the wild beasts" or "wild deer park" and refers to the deer park (now Croxteth Park) established there by King Edward the Confessor. West Derby became the main administrative area in today's Liverpool for the Norman Conquest and was the largest area within the West Derby Hundred which covered most of south west Lancashire.

Contrary to popular belief, the original Earls of Derby were not conferred their title from West Derby, but from the county of Derbyshire, Robert de Ferrers being the first Earl. Subsequent titles were created and bestowed on the Stanley Family. The Derby (horse race) is named after the 12th Earl.

Note that the term 'local Derby' actually comes from the town of Derby, though it may also derive from the Earldom family's interest in sport.

There still remains a courthouse built in the reign of Queen Elizabeth I: the first (Wapentake) court in West Derby was established around 1,000 years ago. The West Derby Courthouse, built in 1586, was restored and conserved in 2005 and is the only freestanding post-medieval courthouse in Britain. The tiny Grade II* listed building is open to the public between 2 pm and 4 pm every Sunday except Easter from April to October inclusive, admission free.

Opposite the courthouse is a set of Victorian cast iron stocks once used as a public restraint for offenders. Villagers used fruit and rotten vegetables to throw at the offenders. The stocks were placed in their current position to commemorate the coronation of Edward VII in 1902. Temporarily removed in 2008 whilst the site was renovated, the stocks have since been put back in place.

The area was home to the Earls of Sefton (family name Molyneux), whose house, Croxteth Hall, and the surrounding countryside estate now forms Croxteth Park, an attractive public space.

In 1835 and 1895, Liverpool boundaries expanded to include West Derby.

From 1894 to 1895 West Derby was an urban district. In 1921 the civil parish had a population of 168,915. On 1 April 1922 the parish was abolished and merged with Liverpool.

=== West Derby Castle ===
West Derby Castle

West Derby once had a motte-and-bailey castle, now completely disappeared, at Castlesite Road and Meadow Lane In 1327 it was reported to be in ruins. There is also some suggestion of a Roman site on a street called Castlesite (nicknamed "The Rosies" by some locals). The site is now a small public park, the shape and dimensions of which are similar to that of a Roman barracks or castra. The remnants of a wooden castle were unearthed on this plot during excavations in the mid 1930s.

== Governance ==
West Derby is mostly within the Liverpool West Derby Parliamentary constituency currently represented by Ian Byrne. The part of West Derby that is in the Croxteth Country Park ward is within the Liverpool Walton Parliamentary constituency currently represented by Dan Carden.

The district is covered by the Sandfield Park, West Derby Deysbrook, West Derby Leyfield, West Derby Muirhead, and the Croxteth Country Park wards.

As of the 2023 elections West Derby is represented on Liverpool City Council by:

Ward	Councillor
Sandfield Park	Cllr Joanne Kennedy (Labour)
West Derby Deysbrook	Cllr John Prince (Labour)
West Derby Leyfield	Cllr Finley Nolan (Labour)
West Derby Muirhead	Cllr Colette Goulding (Labour)
Croxteth Country Park	Cllr Lila Bennett (Labour)

Until 2023 West Derby was represented on the council by the West Derby ward.

== Organisations ==
Alder Hey Children's Hospital is located on the south side of West Derby, at Eaton Road.

Both Everton and Liverpool football clubs located their training grounds in West Derby, Everton at Bellefield and Liverpool at Melwood. However, Everton moved to their new complex in south Liverpool called Finch Farm in 2007 and Liverpool announced the sale of the Melwood training ground in August 2019.

The West Derby Society was founded in 1977 and holds regular monthly meetings and outings. It lobbies on planning and environmental issues. The West Derby Community Association, a registered charity, owns Grade II-listed 'Lowlands' in West Derby. This 1846 mansion underwent restoration and renovation with the help of a £1 million Heritage Lottery Fund grant.

== Education ==
West Derby is home to a number of schools that have produced famous pupils:

- St. Edward's College produced Sir Terry Leahy, former England rugby union player Mike Slemen and actor Michael Williams.
- Cardinal Heenan Catholic High School includes Liverpool footballer Steven Gerrard, professional boxer David Price and musician Mike di Scala. Previously called Cardinal Allen Grammar School, it was attended by Everton footballer Colin Harvey, United States Eagles rugby player, Michael Caulder, who played in the first Rugby World Cup in 1987, and actor Paul McGann.
- Broughton Hall High School former pupils include singer Natasha Hamilton of Atomic Kitten, and actress Jennifer Ellison, who later moved to St. Edward's College for sixth form.

Other schools in the area include Holly Lodge Girls' College, St. Marys Primary School, St. Paul's Junior School, Blackmoor Park Junior School and Emmaus Primary School.

== Notable residents ==
Well known residents of West Derby have included:

- Trent Alexander-Arnold of Real Madrid CF was born in West Derby near the Melwood Training Centre.
- Leslie Banks, Shakespearian actor
- Pete Best, original drummer of the Beatles, who lived in Haymans Green, the home of the Casbah Club, where members of the future Beatles—John Lennon, Sir Paul McCartney, and George Harrison, along with Ken Brown, as the Quarry Men were the original house band.
- Eddie Braben, the scriptwriter for Morecambe and Wise
- Bessie Braddock, Member of Parliament for Liverpool Exchange.
- Herbert Haresnape, Olympic swimmer 1908, 1912.
- Albert Menotti Haynes was born and lived in West Derby, and worked as a railway clerk before emigrating to Argentina where he founded the Editorial Haynes publishing empire; he and his wife were also involved in founding Northlands School.
- Alfred Lafone, leather merchant and MP.
- Carla Lane, scriptwriter lived in Sandforth Road
- William Lassell, who built an observatory at his house "Starfield" in West Derby, a suburb of Liverpool. There he had a 24-inch (610 mm) reflector telescope, for which he pioneered the use of an equatorial mount for easy tracking of objects as the Earth rotates.
- David Price (boxer), Olympic bronze medal boxer.
- Bill Shankly the Liverpool F.C. football manager, whose house in Bellefield Avenue overlooked Bellefield, Everton's then training Ground.
- Thomas Stubbs, cricketer, Played with Liverpool and District cricket team.
- Jamie Webster, Singer and songwriter popular across the Nation

== Transport ==
West Derby railway station was located on the North Liverpool Extension Line. The station building has since become a shop and the access ramps to the former platforms remain, although one of the passages have been closed off to the public. The track has been lifted and the trackbed now forms part of National Cycle Network National Cycle Route 62 and a public footpath between Liverpool and Southport.

Bus routes 12, 13 and 15 run through West Derby and provide links to the City Centre, Huyton, and Stockbridge Village; the 15 bus also links to the nearby Alder Hey Children's Hospital. Bus route 61 also runs through West Derby, and provides a bus service to Bootle Strand and Aigburth Vale, to the south of the city. Bus route 18 runs from the Croxteth Park estate to Liverpool City Centre.

== Filmography ==
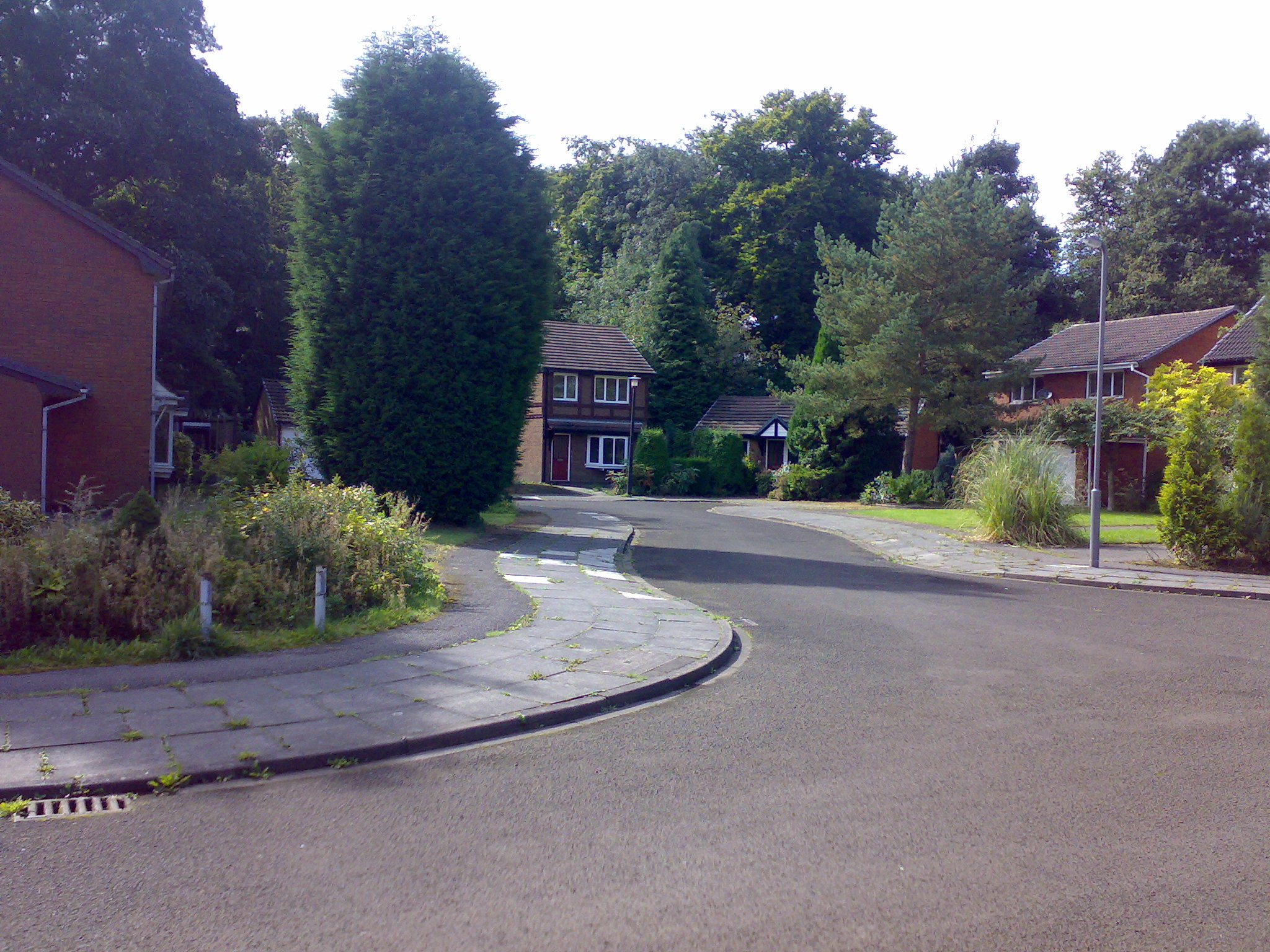
Brookside Close in West Derby

The former Channel 4 soap opera Brookside was filmed on a housing development built on part of Lord Sefton's estate.
