= Edward Corker =

- Edward Corker (1636–1702), English settler in Dublin
- Edward Corker (1666–1734), nephew of Edward Corker above
