= Henry Bathurst (judge) =

- Born: 1623; Theddingworth, Leicestershire
- Died: 1676 (aged 52–53)
- Education: Trinity College, Oxford
- Occupation: Judge
- Spouse: Jane

Henry Bathurst (1623–1676) was an English-born judge in seventeenth-century Ireland, and a member of a prominent Royalist family. He was Attorney General for the province of Munster and Recorder of Cork and Kinsale. As a judge he had a reputation, whether deserved or otherwise, for exceptional severity towards Quakers.

== Family ==
He was born at Theddingworth, Leicestershire, one of the thirteen sons of George Bathurst and his wife Elizabeth Villiers, daughter and heiress of Edward Villiers of Hothorpe Hall, Northamptonshire. The Bathurst boys were described by an acquaintance: "all the sons ingenious and prosperous, and most of them very handsome". Of his twelve brothers, six were killed in the English Civil War, fighting on the Royalist side. His surviving brothers included the statesman Sir Benjamin Bathurst (died 1704) and Dr Ralph Bathurst, Dean of Wells (1620–1704).

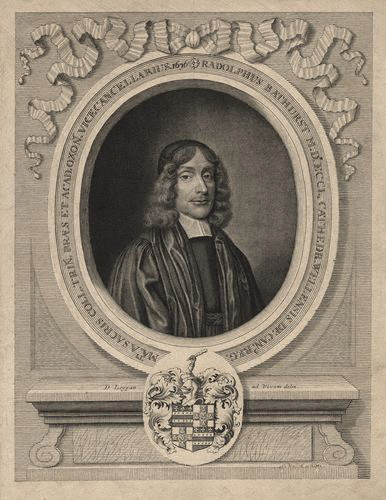
Dr Ralph Bathurst, Dean of Wells, Henry's elder brother

== A Judge in Ireland ==
He was educated at Trinity College, Oxford, studied law at Clifford's Inn and entered the Inner Temple in 1646. He retained an affection for Trinity, and left the College a bequest in his will. He was called to the Bar in 1653. At an uncertain date, he was sent to Ireland as Attorney General to the Lord President of Munster, though in the disturbed political conditions of the time it is unclear to what extent he was able to carry out his duties. He appears to have become Recorder of Cork in the 1650s, and was elected Recorder of Kinsale in October 1656. His salary as Recorder of Kinsale was 15 shillings a year. He became a member of the Irish Bar, and was admitted to the King's Inns, Dublin, in January 1658.

In 1660 he was chosen to sit in the Convention which oversaw the Restoration of Charles II in Ireland and acted as the effective Parliament of Ireland until the election of a properly constituted Parliament (i.e. one which had the royal assent to its actions) the following year.

In 1671, when the English Crown issued a proclamation for the Royal Charter for Cork (and several other Irish Town corporations) to be renewed, Henry was chosen by the Cork city fathers to negotiate its renewal. He settled permanently in Kinsale, and became a burgess of the town in 1672.

== Personal life ==
His wife was named Jane, but her family name is unknown: they had no children. His will was admitted to probate in May 1676. Henry and Jane lived at Castlepark, near Kinsale Harbour. Their relations with another prominent Castlepark family, the Brocketts (descendants of Colonel William Brockett, who was appointed military Governor of Kinsale in 1642), were extremely bad, resulting in a serious of acrimonious lawsuits and countersuits, involving claims of larceny among other torts. The litigation began in the late 1660s and dragged on until Henry's death. The principal dispute seems to have been about the right to ownership of certain property in Kinsale, and does not necessarily indicate serious wrongdoing on either side.

Castlepark, Kinsale, where Henry lived

== Attitude to Quakers ==
A book entitled A Compendious View of some Extraordinary Sufferings of the People called Quakers... in the Kingdom of Ireland, by Abraham Fuller and Thomas Holms (first published in 1671, in Henry's lifetime), accused Henry, in his capacity as Chief Magistrate of Kinsale, of exceptional severity towards the Quaker community of County Cork. The evidence for his persecution of Quakers, however, seems to rest on a single case, that of Lucretia Cooke, wife of a prominent Irish Quaker, Edward Cooke of Bandon. Mrs Cooke was imprisoned in Kinsale on Henry's orders for calling on the local Protestant clergy and congregation to repent of their sins. Arguably this isolated case does not justify Fuller and Holms' description of Henry as a "persecutor" of Quakers, since there seems to be no evidence of a widespread campaign against them in the town of Kinsale in Bathurst's lifetime.

== Sources ==
- Collins, Arthur Peerage of England 5th Edition London 1756
- Council Book of the Corporation of Kinsale 1652–1800
- Detailed abstract from the will of Henry Bathurst, Recorder of Kinsale and Attorney General for Munster 1675 National Library of Ireland Ms.139 p. 86
- Fuller, Abraham and Holms, Thomas A Compendious View of Some Extraordinary Sufferings of the People called Quakers, both in person and in substance, in the Kingdom of Ireland (1671) Republished Dublin 1731
- King's Inns Admission Papers 1607–1867 Irish Manuscripts Commission Dublin 1982
- Tuckey, Francis H. The county and city of Cork Remembrancer; or Annals of the county and city of Cork Osborne Savage and Son Cork 1837
