= Ralph Bathurst =

English theologian and physician

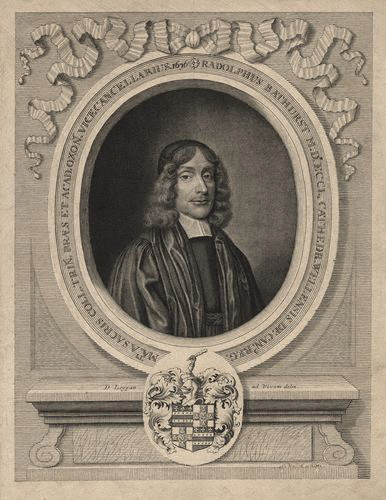
- Portrait of Bathurst, 1676, by David Loggan.
- Born: 1620; Hothorpe, Northamptonshire, England
- Died: 1704 (aged 83–84)
- Education: Trinity College, University of Oxford
- Occupations: Theologian, physician
- Title: Vice-Chancellor of the University of Oxford
- Term: 1673–1676
- Predecessor: Peter Mews
- Successor: Henry Clerke

Ralph Bathurst, FRS (1620 – 14 June 1704) was an English theologian and physician.

== Early life ==
He was born in Hothorpe, Northamptonshire in 1620 and educated at King Henry VIII School, Coventry.

He graduated with a B.A. degree from Trinity College, Oxford in 1638, where he had a family connection with the President, Ralph Kettell (1563–1643).

== Oxford science and medicine ==
He originally intended a career in the Church of England, and was ordained in 1644, but his prospects were disrupted by the English Civil War, and he turned to medicine. He collaborated with Thomas Willis, and it was to Bathurst that Willis dedicated his first medical publication, the Diatribae Duae of 1659.

Bathurst was active in the intellectual ferment of the time, and very well-connected. In the account given by John Wallis of the precursor groups to the Royal Society of London, Bathurst is mentioned as one of the Oxford experimentalists who gathered from 1648–9. Also in that group were Willis, William Petty and Seth Ward. The group expanded in the 1650s when it gathered around John Wilkins of Wadham College, close however to Oliver Cromwell, and then included also Jonathan Goddard, Thomas Millington, Laurence Rooke, and Christopher Wren. Later Robert Boyle joined.

Bathurst belonged also to the overlapping circle of physicians following the tradition of William Harvey, and which included again Willis, George Ent, Walter Charleton, Nathaniel Highmore, and Charles Scarburgh; these were royalists who had attended Charles I of England. In the celebrated case of Anne Greene, who survived a hanging, the physicians intending to dissect the cadaver were Bathurst, Petty, Willis, and Henry Clerke.

He worked in practical medicine under the physician Daniel Whistler (1619–1684). This was during the First Anglo-Dutch War of 1652 to 1654, when Whistler was in charge of wounded naval personnel. He theorised fruitfully in 1654 on respiration, in a dissertation for his higher medical degree, and his ideas were later taken up, by Boyle and John Mayow.

== Later life ==
On the English Restoration in 1660, he reverted to a career in the church. There is a story that he had acted as archdeacon and deputy to Robert Skinner, Bishop of Oxford, who was imprisoned by the Parliamentarians. He was elected a Fellow of the Royal Society in 1663, and was made President of Trinity College in 1664, where he initiated building work to designs by Christopher Wren, a personal friend. He also swayed Samuel Parker from Presbyterian views to an Anglican outlook.

In 1670, he was Dean of Wells Cathedral. For three years from 1673, he was Vice-Chancellor of the University of Oxford, earning a complimentary reference in a John Dryden poem. John Harris, a Trinity College student in the 1680s, wrote about the intellectual and scientific atmosphere of the college under Bathurst.

A biography was written by Thomas Warton.

== Family ==
He was one of thirteen sons of George Bathurst of Theddingworth, Leicestershire and his first wife Elizabeth Villiers of Hothorpe Hall, Northamptonshire. This large royalist family suffered greatly in the Civil War, with six of Ralph Bathurst's brothers being killed. Surviving brothers included the politician Sir Benjamin Bathurst and Henry Bathurst, Recorder of Cork.

Theodore Bathurst (died 1651), known as a neo-Latin poet, was a nephew. Another nephew was Ralph Bohun (1639–1716), a poet and experimentalist.

== Sources ==
- Chambers' Book of Days

Academic offices
Preceded by Hannibal Potter	President of Trinity College, Oxford; 1664–1704	Succeeded by Thomas Sykes
Preceded by Peter Mews	Vice-Chancellor of Oxford University; 1673–1676	Succeeded by Henry Clerk
