= Recorder of Kinsale =

Judicial office-holder in pre-independence Ireland

The recorder of Kinsale was a judicial office-holder in pre-independence Ireland. He was the chief magistrate of the town of Kinsale. Given the population of the town, which has fluctuated between 5000 and 7000 over the years, the need for a full-time judge may be questioned. However Kinsale has been a chartered town since 1334, and the charter granted by Elizabeth 1 in 1589 explicitly provided for the office of Recorder, as did that granted to Clonakilty by James I in 1613. The first recorder of Kinsale whose name is definitely known is Robert Slighe, who served in that office between approximately 1601 and 1615.

Like other Irish recorders, the recorder of Kinsale was not a Crown appointment, but was elected by Kinsale Corporation, also known as the Court of the Hundred. They could annul the election, as they did that of John Dowdall in 1692.

In addition to presiding at criminal trials, it seems likely that he held a weekly court of Petty session to deal with routine judicial business, as his colleague the recorder of Clonakilty did. The Reorder was also charged with keeping the peace. Henry Bathurst, in the 1650s, was much occupied with curbing the supposed threat to public order posed by the large Quakers community in County Cork, and was accused, perhaps unfairly, of being a "great persecutor" of that religious denomination.

Due to the size of the town, the recorder's duties were not especially onerous: the salary was a modest 15 shillings a year. The duties of the recorder were often combined with another Government post. Henry Bathurst was also Recorder of Cork, as was William Worth. Sir Richard Cox, 1st Baronet, was also Recorder of Clonakilty from 1675: he later went on to hold high judicial office, notably as Lord Chancellor of Ireland. William Rowley, who was the elder brother of Admiral Sir Josias Rowley, and who was Recorder from 1796 to 1812, combined that position with the office of Commissioner of Customs for Kinsale, and also sat in the Irish House of Commons as member for Kinsale.

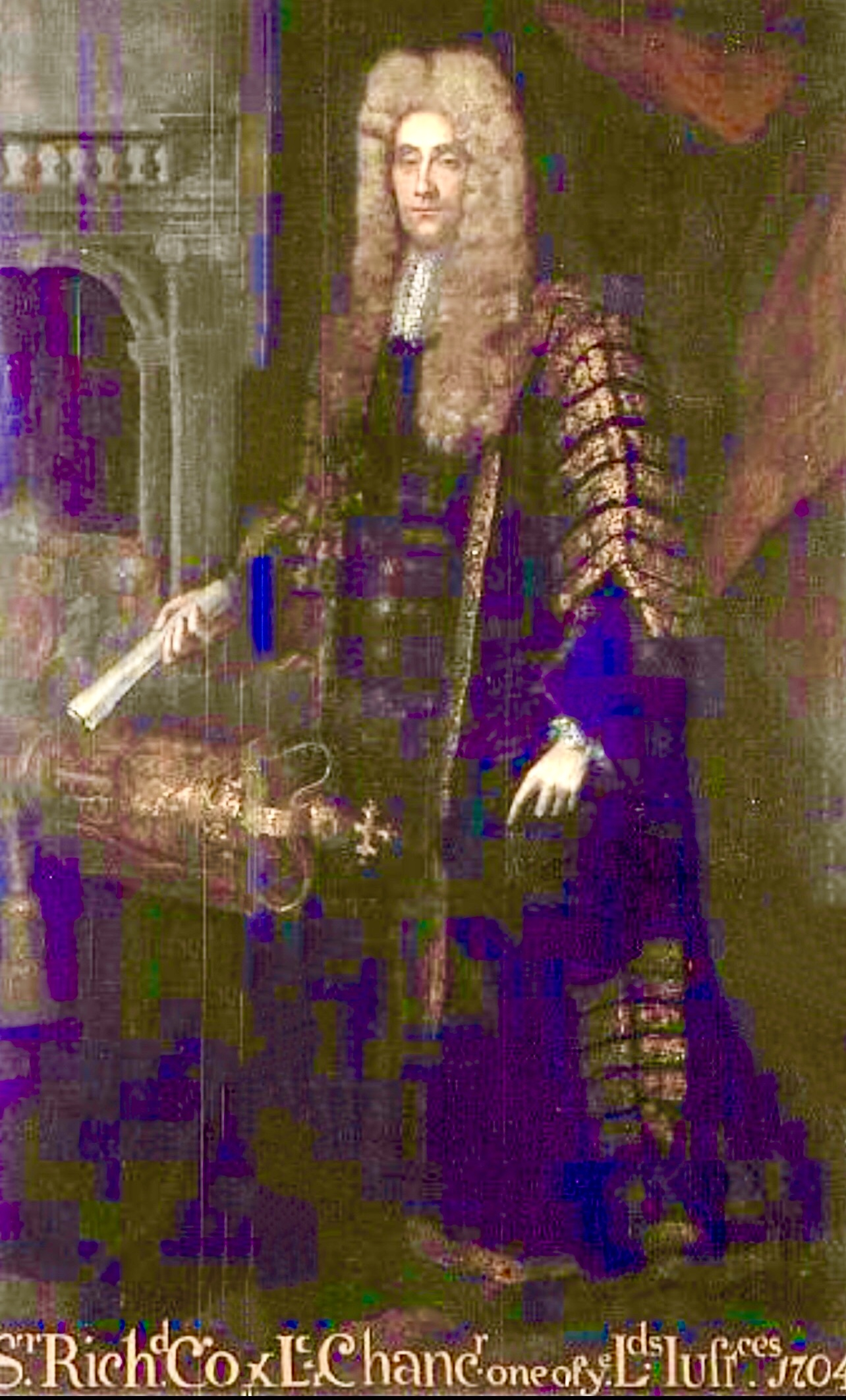
Sir Richard Cox, 1st Baronet, Recorder of Kinsale and later Lord Chancellor

Like all Irish recorderships within their jurisdiction, the office was abolished by the Irish Free State in 1924.

== List of recorders of Kinsale (incomplete) ==
- 1601 Robert Slighe
- 1630s William Galway (died 1637)
- 1652 Major Richard Hodden
- 1656 Henry Bathurst (also Recorder of Cork)
- 1676 William Worth, also Recorder of Cork and later a Baron of the Court of Exchequer (Ireland)
- 1681-1689 Sir Richard Cox, 1st Baronet (also Recorder of Clonakilty, later Lord Chancellor of Ireland)
- 1691 John Dowdall election declared invalid
- 1692 Francis Bernard, later Solicitor General for Ireland and judge of the Court of Common Pleas (Ireland)
- ? Joseph Busteed (died 1734)
- 1734 Stephen Bernard, of Prospect Hall, son of Francis Bernard; Stephen was also MP for Bandonbridge
- 1762 Dominick Sarsfield
- 1796 William Rowley (also MP for Kinsale)
- 1816 Anthony Connell (died 1832)
- 1870s William Meade

== Sources ==
- Burke's Peerage 107th Edition Delaware 2003
- Fuller, Abraham and Holms, Thomas A Compendious View of Some Extraordinary Sufferings of the Quakers in Ireland 2nd Edition Dublin 1731
- Lewis, Samuel A Topographical Dictionary of Ireland London S. Lewis and Co 1837
- O'Hart, John Pedigrees of Ireland 5th Edition 1892
- Warrant issued by Robert Slighe, Recorder of Kinsale 7 July 1615
