= Robert Gorges (1624–1699) =

British-Irish politician

Robert Gorges (1624–1699) was an English civil servant who settled in Ireland following his appointment as secretary to Henry Cromwell.

Parliament of Ireland
Preceded by Francis Slingsby; Anthony Doppinge	Member of Parliament for Bandonbridge; 1666; With: John Read	Succeeded by Charles MacCarthy; Daniel MacCarthy Reagh
Preceded by John Hussey; James FitzGerald	Member of Parliament for Ratoath; 1692–1693; With: Edward Corker (1636–1702)	Succeeded by Edward Corker (1636–1702); Thomas Molyneux
