= Theodore Bathurst =

English poet and translator

- Born: c. 1587; Hothorpe Hall, Northamptonshire, England
- Died: 1652; Orton, England
- Resting place: Orton Waterville, Huntingdonshire. England
- Education: Pembroke College, Cambridge (BA)
- Occupations: Latin poet and Church of England clergyman
- Writing career
- Language: Latin and English
- Period: Early modern
- Genre: pastoral poetry
- Notable work: Calendarium Pastorale

Theodore Bathurst (c. 1587–1652), also known as Theophilus Bathurst, was an English poet and translator who wrote in the Latin language. His most notable work is Calendarium Pastorale (English: The Pastoral Calendar).

== Life ==
Bathurst was descended from an ancient family of Hothorpe in Northamptonshire, and a relative of Dr Ralph Bathurst, the famous English physician, scholar, and divine. He entered Trinity College, Cambridge in 1602, but graduated BA in 1606 from Pembroke College, the college to which Edmund Spenser belonged.

Bathurst led a private life, and was a man of little ambition. So much the more, says one of his editors, he deserved honour as he desired it less.

== Works ==
While at Pembroke, he executed his translation of Spenser's The Shepheardes Calender. He wrote the first two ecologues at Pembroke, which were dedicated to Thomas Neville, master of Trinity College, Cambridge. This translation had the honour of being highly commended by Sir Richard Fanshawe, who has himself left us specimens of Latin translations of English verse.

Bathurst's translation was edited first by Dr William Dillingham of Emmanuel College, and dedicated to Francis Lane. It was republished by John Ball, who, in his address to the reader, says he had much and long labour in procuring a copy of Bathurst's work. It was then already rare among the booksellers.

Ball's edition is accompanied by the original eclogues on the opposite pages. He speaks of Bathurst, in the address above mentioned, as

‘poeta non minus ornatus quam gravis idem postea theologus, qui has eclogas ita Latinè vertit ut obscuris lucem, asperis lævitatem, atque omnibus fere nitorem et elegantiam fœneraverit.

He added a Latin dissertation, De vita Spenseri et scriptis (English: The Life and Writings of Spenser; Lond. 8vo, no date and 1732). The precise title of Bathurst's book is:

Calendarium Pastorale sive Eclogæ duodecim totidem anni mensibus accommodatæ Anglicè olim scriptæ ab Edmundo Spenser Anglorum poetarum principe; nunc autem eleganti Latino carmine donatæ a Theodoro Bathurst Aulæ Pembrochianæ apud Cantabrigienses aliquando socio (English: A pastoral Eclogue or twelve calendar months of the year as many had once written in England, adapted from English poets, principally Edmund Spenser, but now an elegant Latin poem given by Theodore Bathurst Pembroke Hall, Cambridge, a partner; Lond. 8vo, 1653).

In 1653 when the first edition of a parallel text was released, John Hacket offered some insights into its origins, which he passed to the reviser of the text William Dillingham, master of Emmanuel College, Cambridge. Emmanuel was at the forefront of the Puritan movement in intellectual circles, presenting the orthodox position on the doctrine of the trinity. Dillingham's text was included in the 1679 text of Spenser's Works, which was reissued in 1732.
