= Sir William Moore, 2nd Baronet =

Sir William Moore, 2nd Baronet (1663 – 28 August 1693) was an Anglo-Irish politician.

Moore was the son of Sir Emanuel Moore, 1st Baronet and Martha Hull, and in 1692 he succeeded to his father's baronetcy. He was the Member of Parliament for Bandonbridge in the Irish House of Commons between 1692 and his death in 1693.

Moore married Catherine Percival on 19 October 1683; they had two sons. He was succeeded in his title by his eldest son, Emanuel Moore.

Parliament of Ireland
Preceded by Patriot Parliament; Charles MacCarthy; Daniel MacCarthy Reagh	Member of Parliament for Bandonbridge; 1692–1693; With: Edward Riggs	Succeeded by Francis Bernard; Edward Riggs
Baronetage of Ireland
Preceded by Emanuel Moore	Baronet (of Rosscarbery); 1692–1693	Succeeded by Emanuel Moore
