= Sir Thomas Molyneux, 1st Baronet =

Irish physician (1661–1733)

Sir Thomas Molyneux, Bt FRS
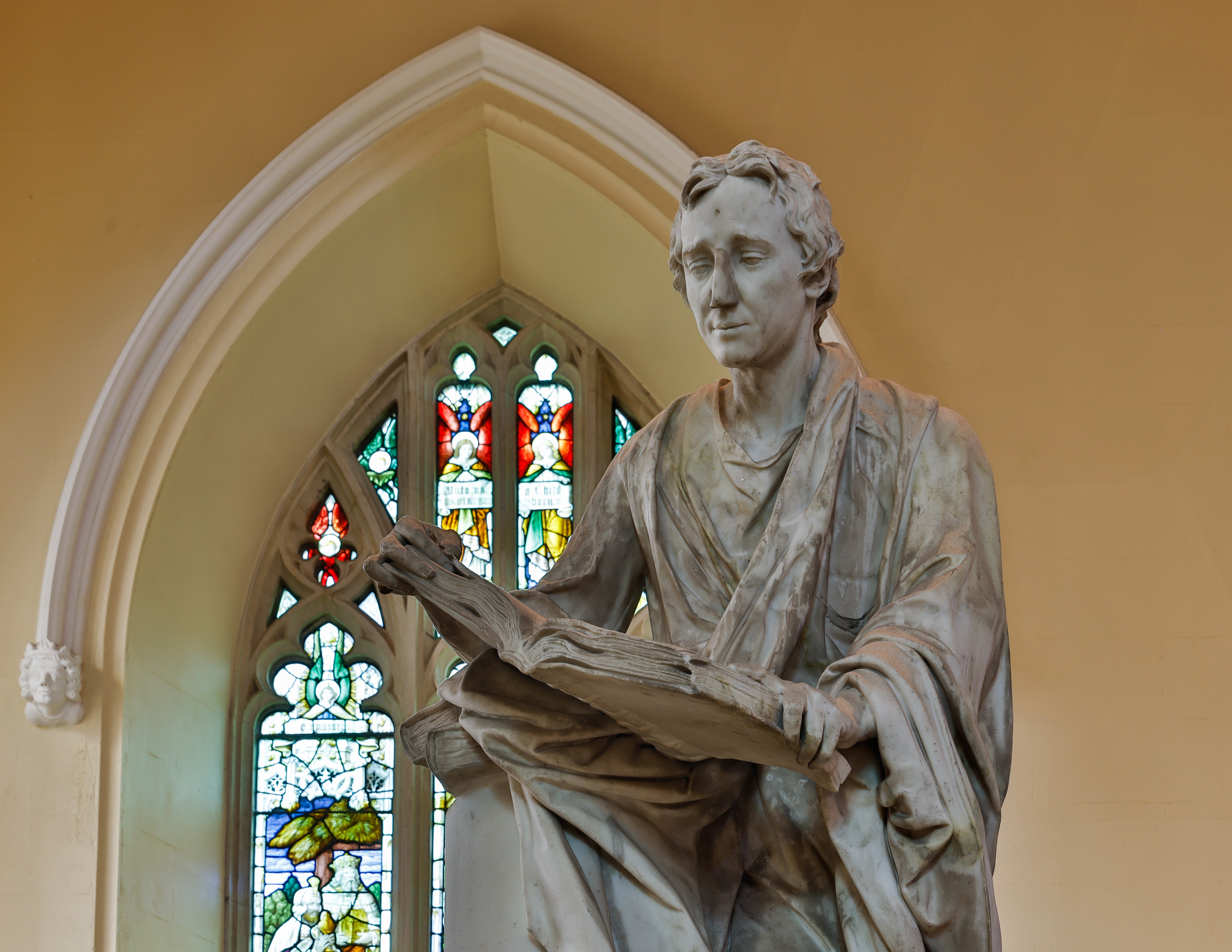
- Memorial statue of Molyneux in St. Patrick's Cathedral in Armagh, sculpted by Louis-François Roubiliac
- Born: 14 April 1661; Dublin, Ireland
- Died: 19 October 1733 (aged 72)
- Relatives: Sir Thomas Molyneux (Great-grandfather); William Molyneux (brother); Sir Capel Molyneux, 3rd Baronet (son)
- Medical career
- Institutions: Trinity College, Dublin

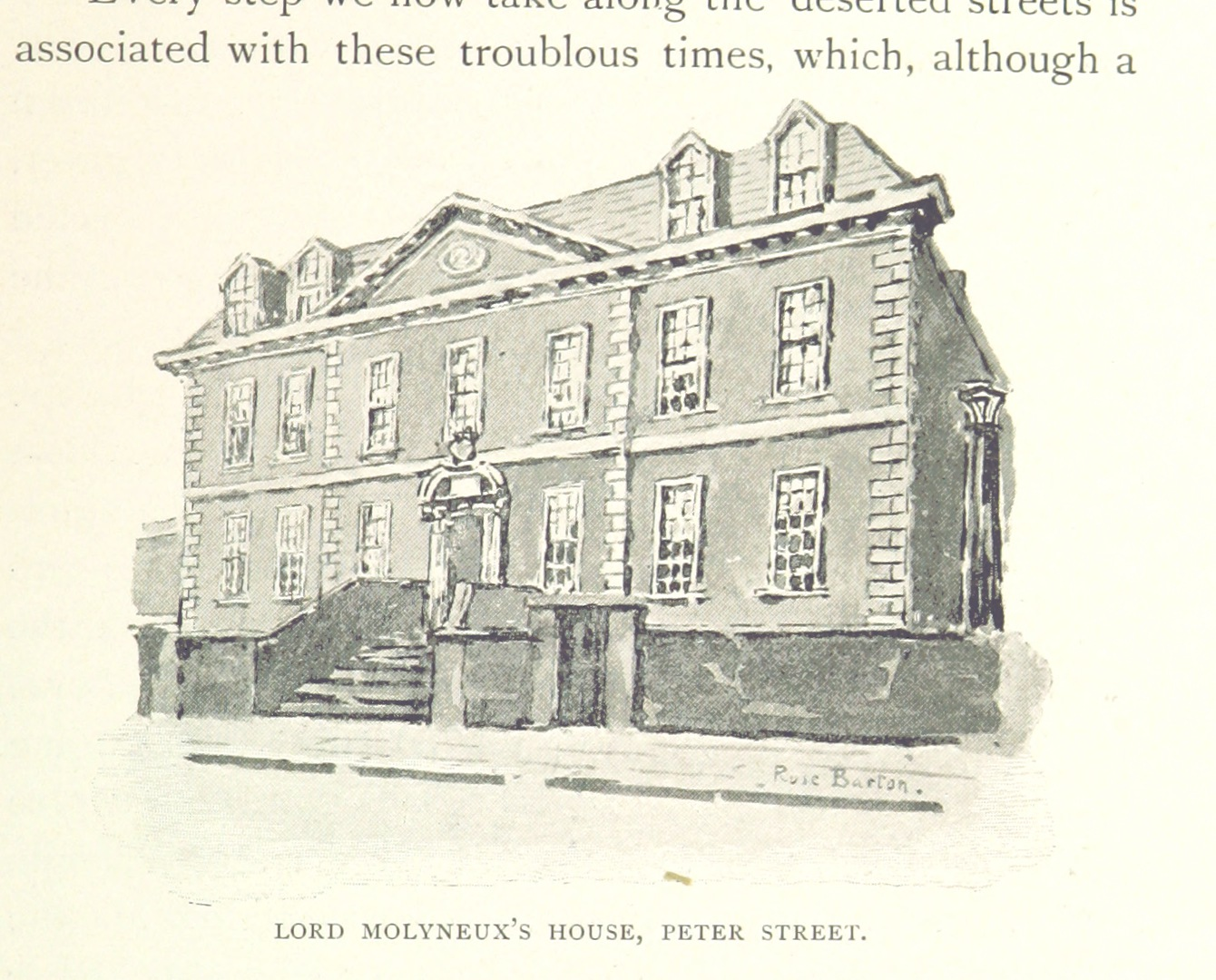
Molyneux House on Peter Street, Dublin

Lieutenant General Sir Thomas Molyneux, 1st Baronet FRS (14 April 1661 – 19 October 1733) was an Irish physician.

== Life ==
Molyneux was the youngest son of Samuel Molyneux of Castle Dillon, County Armagh, Master Gunner of Ireland and his wife Margaret Anne Dowdall, and grandson of Daniel Molyneux, Ulster King of Arms. His great-grandfather, Sir Thomas Molyneux, who was originally from Calais, had come to Ireland in about 1576, and became Chancellor of the Exchequer of Ireland. William Molyneux, the philosopher, was his brother.

Educated at Trinity College, Dublin, he became a doctor with an MA and MB in 1683, aged 22. He went to Europe and continued his medical studies, resulting in gaining the MD degree in 1687. He was admitted a Fellow of the Royal Society on 3 November 1686.

Molyneux practised medicine in Chester sometime before 1690. He returned to Ireland after the Battle of the Boyne. He was elected a Fellow of the Irish College of Physicians in 1692 and became the first State Physician in Ireland and also Physician General to the Army in Ireland, with the rank of lieutenant general. Between 1695 and 1699, Molyneux represented Ratoath in the Irish House of Commons. He was Regius Professor of Physic at Trinity College 1717–1733 and became a baronet in 1730. Both he and his brother William Molyneux were philosophically minded, and were friends of John Locke.

He married in 1694 Catherine Howard, daughter of Ralph Howard, at that time Regius Professor of Physic at Trinity College. They had four sons and eight daughters, of whom Daniel and Capel both succeeded to the baronetcy. Thomas died in 1733 at the age of 72. He was buried in St. Audoen's Church, Dublin, and there is a fine monument to him in Armagh Cathedral by the sculptor Roubiliac, with an elaborate description of his honours and genealogy. His portrait is in Armagh Museum.

== Works ==
A partial list from the Philosophical Transactions of the Royal Society:

- A Letter from Dr. Thomas Molyneux, Fellow of the Royal Society to the Right Reverend St. George, Lord Bishop of Clogher; Concerning Swarms of Insects, That of Late Years Have Much Infested Some Parts of the Province of Connought in Ireland Phil. Trans. 1695-1697 19, 741-756 (Cockchafer)
- A Discourse Concerning the Large Horns Frequently Found under Ground in Ireland, Concluding from Them That the Great American Deer, Call'd a Moose, Was Formerly Common in That Island: With Remarks on Some Other Things Natural to That Country. By Thomas Molyneux, M. D. Fellow of the King and Queens Colledge of Physicians in Ireland, and of the Royal Society in England Phil. Trans. 1695-1697 19, 489-512 (Irish Elk)
- A Letter from Dr. Thomas Molyneux to Dr. Martin Lister, Fellow of the Colledge of Physicians, and of the Royal Society, in, London: Containing Some Additional Observations on the Giants Causeway in Ireland Phil. Trans. 1698 20, 209-223 (Giants Causeway)
- An Essay concerning Giants. Occasioned by Some Further Remarks on the Large Humane Os Frontis, or Forehead-Bone, Mentioned in the Philosophical Transactions of February, 1684/5 Number 168. By Dr.Thomas Molyneux, M. D. Fellow of the Kingand Queens Colledge of Physicians in Ireland, and of the Royal Society in England Phil. Trans. 1700-1701 22, 487-508
- A Letter from Dr Thomas Molyneux, F. R. S. to the Right Reverend St George, Lord Bishop of Clogher in Ireland, Containing Some Thoughts concerning the Ancient Greek and Roman Lyre, and an Explanation of an Obscure Passage in One of Horace's Odes Phil. Trans. 1702-1703 23, 1267-1278

Other Works:

- A Discourse Concerning the Danish Mounts, Forts and Towers in Ireland, Part III of Gerard Boate, A Natural History of Ireland in Three Parts, George & Alexander Ewing, Dublin (1726)

Parliament of Ireland
Preceded by Edward Corker; Robert Gorges	Member of Parliament for Ratoath; 1695–1699; With: Edward Corker	Succeeded by Edward Forde; Richard Gorges
Baronetage of Ireland
New creation	Baronet (of Castle Dillon); 1730–1733	Succeeded by Daniel Molyneux
