= Recorder (judge) =

Judicial officer

A recorder is a judicial officer in England and Wales and some other common law jurisdictions.

== England and Wales ==
In the courts of England and Wales, the term recorder (Welsh: cofnodwr) currently has two distinct meanings. The senior circuit judge of a borough or city is often awarded the title of "Honorary Recorder". However, "Recorder" is also used to denote a person who sits as a part-time circuit judge.

=== Historic office ===
In England and Wales, originally a recorder was a certain magistrate or judge having criminal and civil jurisdiction within the corporation of a city or borough. Such incorporated bodies were given the right by the Crown to appoint a recorder. He was a person with legal knowledge appointed by the mayor and aldermen of the corporation to 'record' the proceedings of their courts and the customs of the borough or city. Such recordings were regarded as the highest evidence of fact. Typically, the appointment would be given to a senior and distinguished practitioner at the Bar, and it was, therefore, usually executed part-time only, by a person whose usual practice was as a barrister. It carried a great deal of prestige and power of patronage. The recorder of a borough was often entrusted by the mayor and corporation to nominate its Members of Parliament, as was the case with the Recorder of Barnstaple, who in 1545 nominated the two MPs to represent the Borough of Barnstaple. Eventually the recorder became the judge who sat alone, without lay magistrates, in the quarter sessions held for each county borough, and for the larger boroughs which retained the right to hold their own quarter sessions. (Note: In the quarter sessions held for each county (or subdivision of a county), the legally-qualified chairman of the quarter sessions presided over a bench of lay magistrates drawn from the county.) In the cases where the defendant pleaded "not guilty", the recorder sat with a jury. The only survival today of the historic office is the Recorder of London who is still appointed by the Court of Aldermen of the Corporation of the City of London and thereby becomes a member of that court. He is a senior circuit judge sitting at the Central Criminal Court (the Old Bailey).

=== Titular and honorific recorders ===
The ancient recorderships of England and Wales now form part of a system of honorary recorderships which are filled by the most senior full-time circuit judges. At each Crown Court centre, a particular judge is appointed "resident judge", leads the team of judges who sit there and provides the essential link between the judiciary and the administration. In the larger city court centres, the resident judge is usually a senior circuit judge who is recruited and appointed specifically to that post. An exception is the Corporation of the City of London which still follows ancient customs as stated above.

In the many smaller towns and cities where the resident judge is not a senior circuit judge, the position is different. The resident judge is deployed specifically to that post by the Lord Chief Justice (with the concurrence of the Lord Chancellor) from the ranks of the circuit bench. They then hold office as resident judge for a set period, normally four years, although such appointments are renewable.

Whilst the appointment of an honorary recorder has lain with the borough council since the Courts Act 1971, in practice the resident judge is appointed as the honorary recorder. In a borough that is coincident with an ancient assize, the position is titular; that is, the resident judge is automatically entitled honorary recorder and continues to hold that title until their retirement from the post.

In the case where the resident judge is a fixed-term appointment, it is expected that the city or borough council will appoint them as honorary recorder for the duration of their tenure as resident judge. Boroughs which had a power by charter to appoint a recorder before 1971, but which had no quarter sessions, have a preserved right to appoint anyone, including non-lawyers, as an honorary recorder, but an honorary recorder who is not a judge cannot sit as a judge in court or exercise any judicial functions. The procedure to be followed is that laid down by the Lord Chief Justice in his "Guidelines for the Appointment of Honorary Recorders", which states that it has been the practice of most large city councils to appoint the resident judge to be honorary recorder of the city during his tenure of the office. Some new positions have been created since 1971, for example for the Borough of Redbridge.

The appointment of an honorary recorder is made by the borough council concerned, and although it does not require the approval of a higher authority, the Lord Chief Justice has let it be known that he would be pleased if boroughs considering making such an appointment would first consult the Senior Presiding Judge for England and Wales.

Due to the reorganisation of courts, especially where local government reorganisation has occurred at the same time, some titles bestowed by one council may be held by the senior resident judge sitting in another borough; a prominent example is the Recorder of the City of Westminster who presides at the Crown Court situated in the London Borough of Southwark of which there is also the Recorder of that Borough.

The protocol of the use of the title is that it is customary for an honorary recorder, when sitting in the Crown Court in the city or town where he holds that office, to be described as such in the published court lists. This should not be done, however, when the judge is sitting in the Crown Court in another city or town, whether or not that city or town has an honorary recorder of its own.

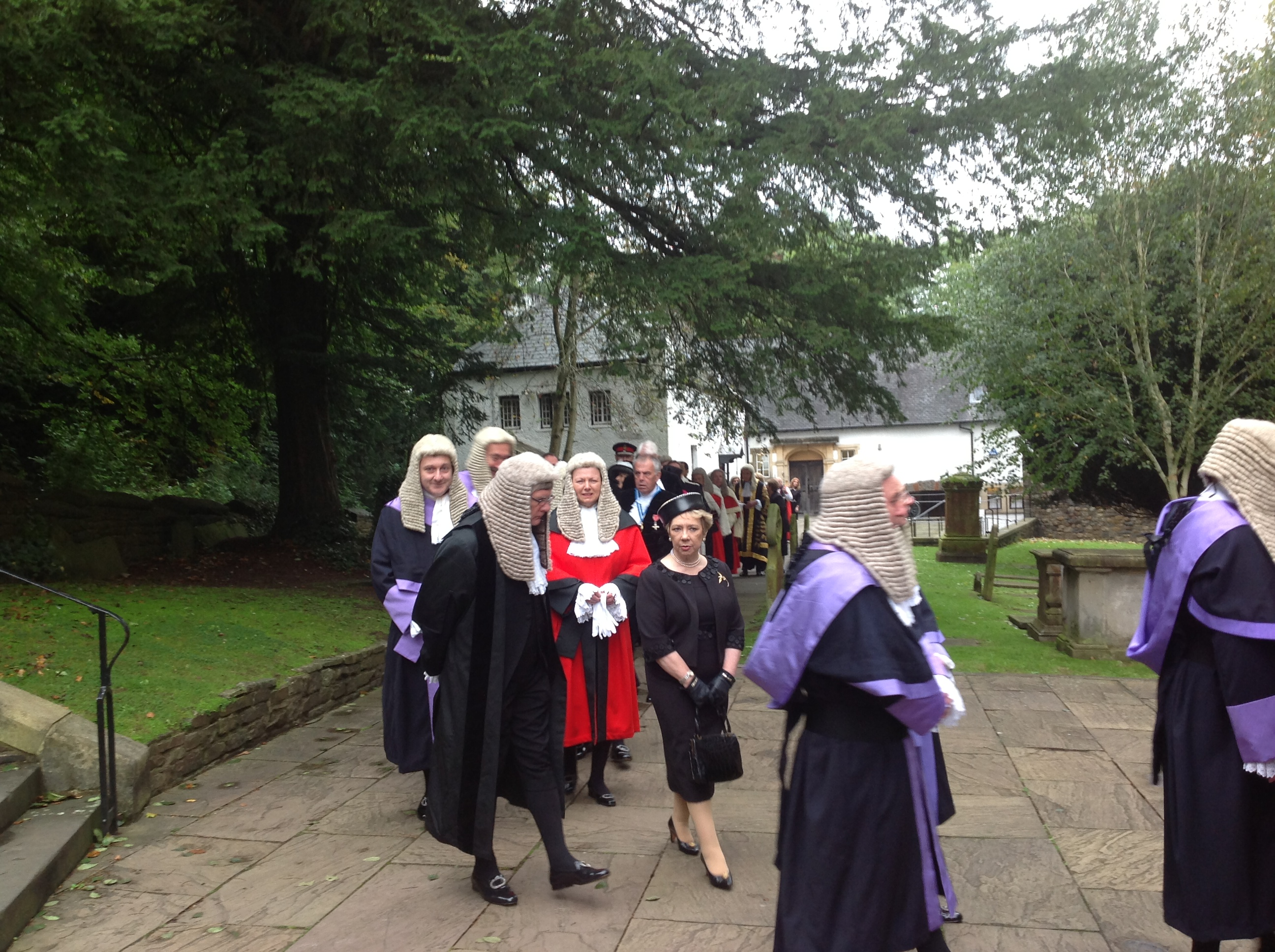
Eleri Rees, the Recorder of Cardiff (red robes), at a ceremonial event with circuit judges (purple robes)

Honorary recorders who are also senior circuit judges are authorised by the Lord Chief Justice to wear red robes when sitting in court. These robes are based on the design of the robes worn by judges of the County Court, but in red and black. They were designed for the recorders of Manchester and Liverpool in 1956. The right to wear them in court was extended in the 1980s to the other senior circuit judges appointed as honorary recorders, but has not been extended to those who are not senior circuit judges. Accordingly, when sitting in court, honorary recorders who are not senior circuit judges continue to wear the normal robes of a circuit judge sitting in the Crown Court. In addition, honorary recorders who are also senior circuit judges are addressed in court as "My Lord/Lady" (as for a High Court Judge) instead of "Your Honour" (as for other circuit judges, including senior circuit judges who are not honorary recorders). In the law reports and in court lists an honorary recorder is usually styled "The Recorder of X".

=== Recorders as part-time appointments ===
Since 1971 the term "recorder" has also been used for a part-time judicial appointment in England and Wales, providing part-time experience in judicial office. The part-time appointees were initially designated "Assistant Recorder", with a view to promotion to full "recorder". Appointments are no longer made to the position of Assistant Recorder.

Appointments are made by the Crown by Royal Warrant, on the recommendation of the Lord Chancellor. Since 2006 the Lord Chancellor's recommendations are based upon an independent appointments process by the Judicial Appointments Commission.

Eligibility is restricted to barristers, solicitors or Chartered Legal Executives of at least seven years' standing. A recorder, when acting as such, has all the powers of a circuit judge and may sit in the Crown Court, the County Court or the Family Court. A recorder sitting in the Crown, County or Family Court is addressed as "Your Honour" (save in the Central Criminal Court (or Old Bailey) where all judges are addressed as "My Lord (or Lady)"). If appointed to do so under section 9(1) of the Senior Courts Act 1981, a recorder may sit as a part-time High Court judge.

A recorder is paid a daily fee and is expected to sit as a judge for between three and six weeks a year.

== In other jurisdictions ==
=== Ireland and Northern Ireland ===
The Recorder of Dublin was the principal magistrate for the city of Dublin until the office was abolished in 1924. The judicial offices of Recorder of Belfast and Recorder of Derry still exist. There were also, prior to 1924, a Recorder of Cork and Recorders of Limerick (although this office seems to have lapsed about 1840), Youghal, Galway, Enniskillen, Carrickfergus, Kinsale, Dundalk, Waterford, Kilkenny, New Ross, Hillsborough, Cashel, Clonakilty and Clonmel. Given the small population of some of these towns, the Recordership, which was often a right guaranteed to the townspeople by royal charter, was in several cases, such as Kinsale and Clonakilty, a part-time office.

=== Hong Kong ===
Hong Kong operates a system of appointing part-time recorders similar to that in England and Wales. The recordership scheme was introduced in Hong Kong in 1994 to encourage experienced practitioners who are willing to sit as a High Court Judge for a few weeks every year, but are not prepared to commit themselves to a permanent, full-time appointment. It was intended to act as a more formal system of appointment compared to the more ad hoc nature of the appointment of Deputy High Court Judges.

Recorders are practitioners in private practice (in practice, senior counsel) who are appointed by the chief executive on the recommendation of the independent Judicial Officers Recommendation Commission (JORC). The appointment is for a fixed term of a few years, during which the practitioner sits as a recorder hearing cases in the Court of First Instance of the High Court for a few weeks in a year. Recorders may exercise all the jurisdiction, powers and privileges of a full-time judge of the Court of First Instance.

The qualification for appointment as a recorder is the same as that for High Court judge: that is, having practised for at least 10 years as a barrister, advocate, solicitor or judicial officer in Hong Kong or another common law jurisdiction.

As of 1 April 2020, Recorders receive honoraria at a daily rate of HK$11,765.

=== United States and Canada ===
In some U.S. and Canadian jurisdictions, the Recorder's Court is a local court of limited jurisdiction, most often hearing misdemeanors, traffic violations, and other petty criminal offences. The Recorder of New York City was one of the judges of the Court of General Sessions (the local court of general jurisdiction on criminal cases) and presided over most murder trials in New York City. Historically, the City of Detroit, Michigan had a Recorder's Court, which has now been subsumed as 36th District Court and part of Wayne County Circuit Court.

== Biblical usage ==
In the biblical Kingdom of Israel, the recorder was the chancellor or vizier of the kingdom. He brought all weighty matters under the notice of the king, such as complaints, petitions, and wishes of subjects or foreigners. He also drew up papers for the king's guidance, and prepared drafts of the royal will for the scribes. All treaties came under his oversight, and he had the care of the national archives or records, to which, as royal historiographer, he added the current annals of the kingdom.

== See also ==
- Recorder of deeds
