= Declaration of Finglas =

1690 proclamation by William III in Ireland

The Declaration of Finglas was issued on 17 July 1690 by William III of Ireland at Finglas in County Dublin, shortly after his Williamite army's decisive victory at the Battle of the Boyne during the War of the Two Kings.

The Declaration was issued by William from Finglas, where his army had camped following the battle against the Jacobite Irish Army. It was targeted at the followers of William's uncle and rival James II. There was a religious division between the two sides with William backed by Protestants and James mainly supported by Catholics. William was looking for a quick end to the fighting in Ireland, as he was the leader of the Grand Alliance against Louis XIV and his presence was urgently needed elsewhere in Europe. The Declaration was drafted by Sir Richard Cox, 1st Baronet, the future Lord Chancellor of Ireland. William approved the final draft and said he hardly needed to change a word of it.

While offering full protection (effectively a pardon) to those who surrendered by 1 August (this was later extended to 25 August), the Declaration significantly excepted those who were "the desperate leaders of the present rebellion". This was an attempt to split the rank-and-file Jacobites away from their leadership. This repeated a tactic employed by Oliver Cromwell during his Irish Campaign forty years earlier.

Despite the Williamites capturing the Irish capital of Dublin, the uncompromising terms set out at Finglas encouraged many leaders to fight on, and this was reinforced by the successful Jacobite defence of Limerick the same summer. Much of the ordinary population remained loyal to the landowners and to King James while William increasingly had to concentrate his forces in Southern England and Flanders to confront the French, leading to the war dragging on for another year in Ireland.

The Treaty of Limerick in 1691 granted more generous terms to the defeated Jacobites than had been offered at Finglas, allowing them to retain their pre-war estates. This met with many objections from the Irish Parliament who felt the terms offered had been too generous. Nonetheless, a sizeable number of the Jacobite leaders went into exile on the continent in the Flight of the Wild Geese, continuing to swear loyalty to James II and his successors.

== Bibliography ==
- Childs, John. The Williamite Wars in Ireland. Bloomsbury Publishing, 2007.
- McNally, Michael. Battle of the Boyne 1690: The Irish Campaign for the English Crown. Osprey Publishing, 2005.
