= Stephen Bernard (Irish MP) =

Irish Politician

Stephen Bernard was an Irish politician.

He was one of the six sons of Francis Bernard, justice of the Court of Common Pleas (Ireland), and Alice Ludlow. He was a barrister and Recorder of Kinsale. He lived at Prospect Hall, an impressive house near Kinsale. He died at Tarbes, France.

Bernard was born in Dublin and educated at Trinity College, Dublin. From 1727 to 1760, he was MP for Bandon Bridge in County Cork.
