= Hothorpe Hall =

Coordinates: 52.4599°N 1.0161°W

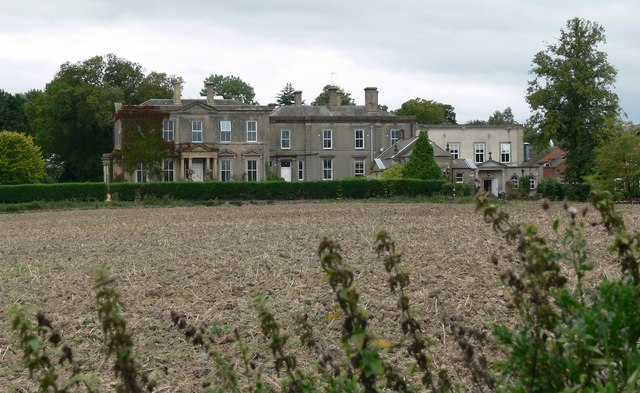
Hothorpe Hall

Hothorpe Hall, in Northamptonshire, is a Georgian manor house near Market Harborough. It lies in the parish of Marston Trussell in Northamptonshire but is close to Theddingworth in Leicestershire. The hall is currently used as a conference centre and wedding venue.

== History ==
The now-deserted village of Hothorpe was in medieval times a chapelry of Theddingworth, the village immediately to the north across the River Welland.

In 1801 the present Hothorpe House was built by John Cook on the site of an earlier Tudor manor, and in about 1830 the owner removed what remained of the village, rehoused the inhabitants in Theddingworth and laid out the park which surrounds the house. The Cook family lived at Hothorpe until 1881 when John Cook's great-nephew, Henry Everett sold the estate to Sir Humphrey de Trafford, 2nd Baronet, who presented it to his second son Charles de Trafford.

Charles de Trafford lived at Hothorpe for about 47 years, extending the house and, in 1892, building a Roman Catholic chapel. In 1892 he married Lady Agnes Feilding and they raised their family there. The de Traffords left Hothorpe in 1928, initially letting the house to tenants.

In 1941, Hothorpe was sold to a timber merchant and was almost immediately requisitioned for the housing of evacuee children during World War II. In 1955, Hothorpe was about to be sold for demolition when it was purchased by The Lutheran Council of Great Britain for use as a conference centre. In 1984, Hothorpe was purchased by three families as a conference centre and wedding venue.

It was the birthplace of painter Simon Elwes (1902 – 1975).

== Earlier houses on the site ==
In the Domesday Book (1086), Hothorpe was under the ownership of Bury St Edmunds Abbey, but by the time of Henry III (1216-1272) it was under the control of a feudal overlord, the Earl of Huntingdon.

In 1330, Hothorpe was owned by Edmund Trussell, who married Margery d'Oserville whose family had lived here for about 34 years. The Trussells held the manor for 150 years, and then in 1482, there were three changes of ownership in one year.

William Villiers became Lord of the Manor in 1506, and the family held Hothorpe for about 94 years. In about 1600, Sir Edmund Montague of Boughton House near Kettering, laid claim to part of Hothorpe Manor – a claim dating back to about 1050. This was resolved by the owner of Hothorpe agreeing to pay 25 shillings a year to the Montagues. This right was subsequently transferred to the Spencer Estate of Althorp and was increased to £5 per annum, which is still paid to Earl Spencer.

By 1610, George and Elizabeth Bathurst were living at Hothorpe with their family of 13 sons and four daughters. They were staunch supporters of Charles I, and six of the sons were killed fighting for the king. One of the sons was Ralph Bathurst, FRS (1620–1704), vice-chancellor of the University of Oxford. Other sons included the politician Sir Benjamin Bathurst (died 1704) and the Irish judge Henry Bathurst (1623-1676).

For a few years up to 1715, Hothorpe was owned by the Cave family, who lived at Stanford Hall.

In 1788, William Cooke bought the Hall. At this time, the house was probably of Elizabethan or Jacobean design, and was sited about one-third of a mile away from the present house to the South West. The old house was pulled down, and the present hall was built in 1799; the crests of many of the previous owners can be seen on the Manor House staircase.
