= Charles MacCarthy (politician) =

Irish Jacobite politician (died 1704)

Colonel Charles MacCarthy (died 20 May 1704) was an Irish Jacobite politician.

MacCarthy was the son of Dermod MacCarthy of Ballea. In 1678 he served in the regiment of Colonel Thomas Dongan in the service of Louis XIV of France. He later became a colonel of militia in the Irish Army of James II of England. In 1689, he was elected as a Member of Parliament for Bandonbridge in the short-lived Patriot Parliament called by James II. The Corporation of Bandon elected him as provost of the town in 1691, but he was prevented from assuming his position by the Jacobite defeat in the Williamite War in Ireland. Upon his death in 1704, he was buried in Kilcrea Friary.

Parliament of Ireland
| Preceded by Robert Gorges; John Read | Member of Parliament for Bandonbridge; 1689; With: Daniel MacCarthy Reagh | Succeeded by Sir William Moore, Bt; Edward Riggs |
