= Francis Bernard (judge) =

Irish lawyer and politician

Francis Bernard SL (1663 – 30 June 1731) was an Irish lawyer, politician and judge.

He was the son of Francis Bernard of Castle Mahon and Mary Freke, daughter of Arthur Freke of Rathbarry and Dorothy Smyth and sister of Percy Freke. Bernard sat as Member of Parliament (MP) in the Irish House of Commons. He represented Clonakilty between 1692 and 1695 and subsequently Bandonbridge between 1695 and 1727. In politics he was described as a "furious Tory", as were his wife's father Stephen Ludlow and her sister Lady Rogerson (his wife's political views are less clear). He held the minor office of Recorder of Kinsale from 1692. He was appointed Solicitor-General for Ireland in 1711, a post he held until 1714, and Prime Serjeant in 1724. Two years later he became a Judge of the Irish Court of Common Pleas, despite holding what were by then definitely the "wrong" political opinions.

In 1693, Bernard married Alice Ludlow, daughter of Stephen Ludlow M.P, of Ardsallagh, County Meath and his wife Alice Lachard of Wales. They had six sons, including Francis and Stephen, and one daughter, Elizabeth (1703-1743), who married first James Caulfeild, 3rd Viscount Charlemont, and subsequently Thomas Adderley. His grandson James, son of Major North Ludlow Bernard and his first wife Rose Echlin, inherited Castle Bernard, the main family residence, from his childless uncle Francis junior. He was the ancestor of the Earls of Bandon. The leading statesman James Caulfeild, 1st Earl of Charlemont was another of Bernard's grandsons.

His death was sudden and unexpected: though close to seventy he had apparently been in good health, and he had been sitting in Court the day before he was found dead in his bed. Alice outlived her husband and died in 1741.

An anonymous elegy praised him extravagantly: "rock of the law and nature's pride". It also suggested that his death was due to overwork.

He was related to Francis James Bernard and Margaret Trudeau.

Parliament of Ireland
Preceded by Patriot Parliament	Member of Parliament for Clonakilty; 1692–1695; With: Percy Freke	Succeeded by Bryan Townsend; Percy Freke
Preceded by Sir William Moore, 2nd Bt; Edward Riggs	Member of Parliament for Bandonbridge; 1695–1727; With: Edward Riggs 1695–1703; Richard Gorges 1703–1713; Arthur Bernard 1713–1715; Martin Bladen 1715–1727	Succeeded by George Freke; Stephen Bernard
Legal offices
Preceded by William Whitshed	Solicitor-General for Ireland; 1711–1714	Succeeded by John Rogerson
