= Sir Emanuel Moore, 3rd Baronet =

Sir Emanuel Moore, 3rd Baronet (1685 – 1733) was an Anglo-Irish politician.

Moore was the son of Sir William Moore, 2nd Baronet and Catherine Percival, and in 1693 he inherited his father's baronetcy. Between 1715 and 1727 he was the Member of Parliament for Downpatrick in the Irish House of Commons.

He married Catherine Alcock on 17 February 1708; together they had four daughters and one son, Charles, who succeeded to his title.

Parliament of Ireland
| Preceded by Mathew Forde; Francis Annesley | Member of Parliament for Downpatrick; 1715–1727; With: Thomas Medlycott | Succeeded by Edward Southwell Jr. Cromwell Price |
Baronetage of Ireland
| Preceded by William Moore | Baronet (of Rosscarbery); 1693–1733 | Succeeded by Charles Moore |
