= William Conner (Irish politician) =

Irish politician

William Conner was an Irish politician.

Conner was born in County Cork and educated at Trinity College, Dublin.

Connere represented Bandonbridge from 1761 to 1766.
