= Thomas Molyneux (statesman) =

French-born English statesman

Thomas Molyneux, or Molinel (1531–1597) was a French-born English statesman, who held high office in Ireland during the Elizabethan era. He founded a dynasty which produced several distinguished members, and became the Molyneux baronets of Castle Dillon, County Armagh.

== Life ==
Molyneux was born in Calais, which was the last English possession in France until the French seized it in 1558. His father was William Molyneux, or Molinel. Both his parents died when he was very young. An only child, he was raised by John Biskin or Brishin, an alderman of the town. When the French seized Calais in January 1558, he was taken prisoner, but freed after he paid a ransom of 500 crowns (the size of the ransom suggests that he had wealthy relatives).

He moved to Bruges and there married Catherine Stabeort (or Salaboethe), daughter of Lodowick Stabeort, a wealthy burgomaster of the town. In 1568, after the outbreak of the Dutch Revolt made life in Bruges increasingly hazardous for foreigners, Molyneux moved with his family to England, and gained the favour of Queen Elizabeth I. In 1576 he moved to Ireland.

He received a grant of land at Swords, County Dublin, where there was a small colony of refugees from the Low Countries. He enjoyed the patronage of Adam Loftus, Archbishop of Dublin. In succession to Sir Edward Waterhouse, he was appointed Chief Victualler to the Irish Army and Receiver of customs on the import of wine: in 1590 he was appointed Chancellor of the Exchequer of Ireland. He contributed £40 (then a very substantial sum) towards the foundation of Trinity College, Dublin (1592).

In 1594 his qualifications to hold public office were questioned: it seems that his French birth and his years in Bruges had raised suspicions that he was a Roman Catholic, and as such ineligible for office. At a hearing before the Court of Exchequer (Ireland), where he was examined by the Attorney General for Ireland, Sir Charles Calthorpe, he pleaded successfully that as an Englishman and Protestant (or a "true Christian", in the idiom of the time), he was fit to hold any office to which the English Crown appointed him.

He died just after New Year 1597, and was buried in Christchurch Cathedral, Dublin; his widow died the following year.

== Family and descendants ==
He and Catherine had two sons and two daughters. Samuel, the elder son, was Surveyor-General of the Queen's Works in Ireland, and sat in the Irish House of Commons as member for Mallow in the Irish Parliament of 1613–15. Daniel (1568–1632), the younger son, became Ulster King at Arms and also sat in the Irish House of Commons in 1613–15 as member for Strabane. Their daughter Catherine married Sir Robert Newcomen, the first of the Newcomen baronets, and had a very large family including Sir Beverley Newcomen, 2nd Baronet, Sir Thomas Newcomen, 3rd Baronet, Sir Robert Newcomen, 4th Baronet, Judith, who married Arthur Ussher of Donnybrook, Jane, who married Sir Henry Tichborne, and Dorcas, whose third husband was the eminent English-born judge Sir Samuel Mayart.

Through Daniel, who married Jane, daughter of Sir William Ussher of Donnybrook and Isabella Loftus (and Arthur's sister) by whom he had eight children, Thomas had a number of distinguished descendants, including:

- Sir Thomas Molyneux, 1st Baronet
- William Molyneux
- Samuel Molyneux.
