= Sir Richard Cox, 1st Baronet =

Irish lawyer and judge

The Right Honourable Sir Richard Cox PC KC
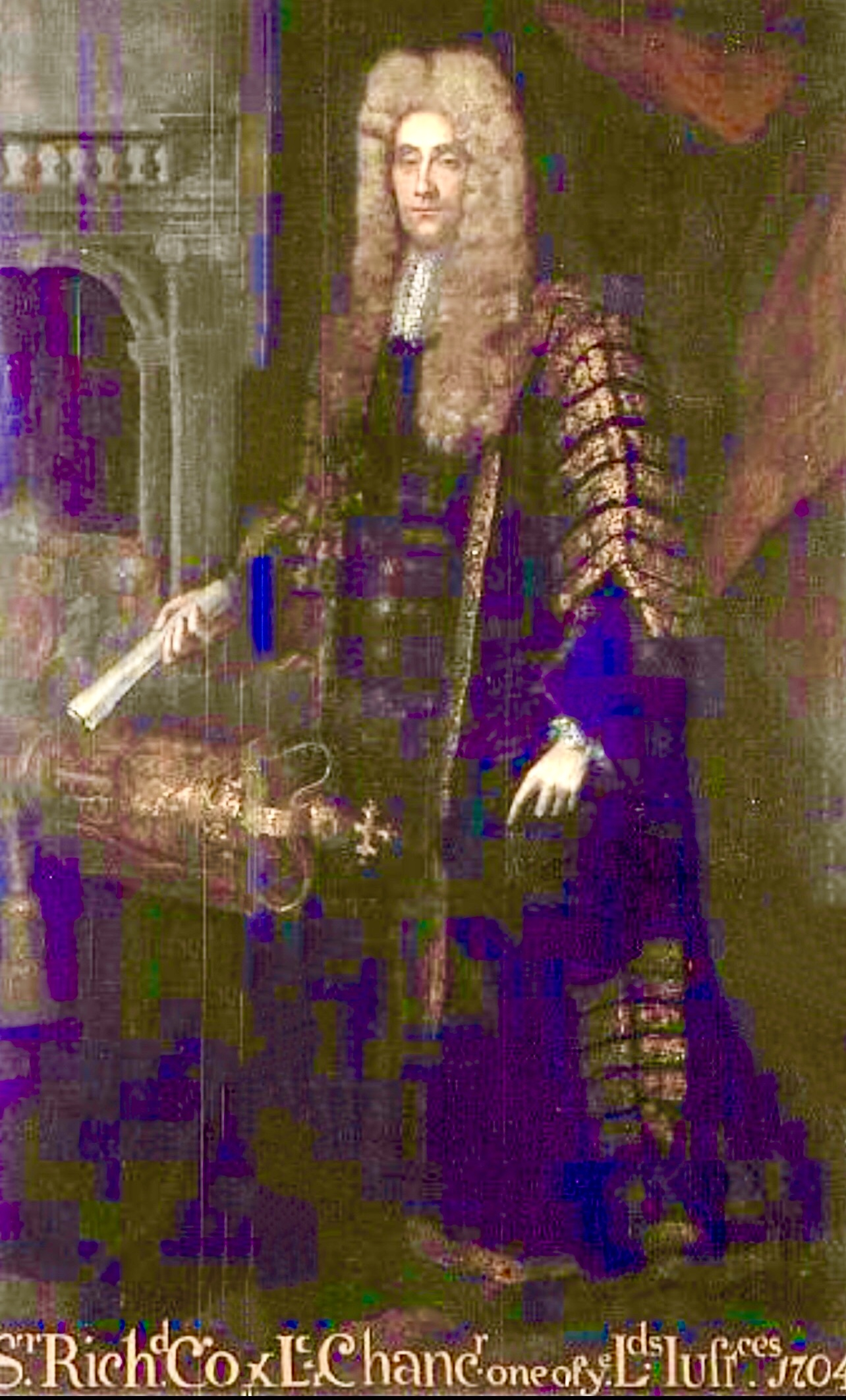
- Sir Richard Cox, 1st Baronet

Lord Chancellor of Ireland
- In office 1703–1707
- Monarch: Queen Anne
- Preceded by: John Methuen
- Succeeded by: Sir Richard Cox, 2nd Baronet

Personal details
- Born: 25 March 1650
- Died: 3 May 1733 (aged 83)
- Children: At least 15, including Michael
- Education: Gray's Inn, London

Sir Richard Cox, 1st Baronet PC (25 March 1650 – 3 May 1733) was an Irish lawyer and judge. He served as Chief Justice of the Common Pleas for Ireland from 1701 to 1703, Lord Chancellor of Ireland from 1703 to 1707 and as Lord Chief Justice of the Queen's Bench for Ireland from 1711 to 1714.

== Early life ==
Cox was born in Bandon, County Cork, Ireland. He was the great-great-grandson of Richard Cox (died 1581), Bishop of Ely from 1559 to 1581 and Chancellor of Oxford from 1547 to 1552. His family had arrived from Wiltshire in about 1600 and was dispossessed in the Irish Rebellion of 1641. His father was Captain Richard Cox II (1610–1651) and his mother was Katherine Bird, daughter of Walter Bird, and widow of Captain Thomas Batten. She was born in Clonakilty, County Cork, Ireland, and died in 1651/52, probably in Bandon. Her death was generally said to be caused by grief for her second husband, who was murdered by one Captain Norton in 1651 in unexplained circumstances. Richard was thus orphaned by the age of three and was raised by his maternal grandparents and his uncle John Bird in County Cork. He went to school in Clonakilty, and then by his own account spent "three years idling". Having inherited a small property from his grandfather, he went to England to study law.

== Career ==
He qualified at Gray's Inn, London, in 1673, and was apprenticed in the manorial courts of the Earl of Cork. In 1674, apparently on the advice of his uncle John, he made an imprudent marriage to Mary Bourne, a girl of fifteen, whose family he later claimed had grossly deceived him as to the size of her dowry. Although the marriage itself was happy enough, he quarrelled bitterly with his mother-in-law about the dowry, retired to the country for a time, and then resolved to make his fortune at the Irish Bar. He built up a lucrative legal practice, was appointed Recorder of Clonakilty in 1675 and Recorder of Kinsale, and acquired an estate in Clonakilty in about 1687; but he lost his recorderships after the accession of James II. He moved to Bristol, where he practised as a barrister. There he became acquainted with the Irish-born diplomat Sir Robert Southwell, later to be Secretary of State (Ireland). Southwell introduced him to the Duke of Ormonde, who acted thereafter as his patron.

== Politician and judge ==
He returned to Ireland and fought at the Boyne in 1690. Following William's victory at the Boyne, Cox drafted the Declaration of Finglas offering full protection (in effect a pardon) to all Jacobites who laid down arms by 1 August 1690, (later extended to 25 August), other than those described as "the desperate leaders of the Rebellion". The King praised Cox's drafting of the Declaration highly, saying that he had not needed to change a word of it. He was knighted on 5 November 1692 by King William, who had great respect for him, and then became a baronet on 21 November 1706. He was made Recorder of Waterford and second justice of the Court of Common Pleas (Ireland) in 1690. He was subsequently appointed military governor of Cork and Constable of Castle Maine in 1691, and a member of the Privy Council of Ireland in 1692.

He approved of the Treaty of Limerick, which offered generous terms to the defeated Jacobites. When it became clear that the Government would not honour the terms of the Treaty, Cox denounced this as a breach of trust, and was in political disgrace for a time as a result, being dismissed from the Privy Council in 1695. This was only a temporary career setback: he became Chief Justice of the Irish Common Pleas in 1701, and was reappointed to the Privy Council the same year.

Although he maintained that as a matter of simple justice, they should receive the toleration they were promised under the Treaty of Limerick, Cox was no friend to Roman Catholics. He fully supported the strict enforcement, and indeed the extension, of the Penal Laws, and as Lord Chancellor, he oversaw the passage of the Popery Act 1704 (2 Anne c. 6 (I)), which was generally seen as an effort to eliminate the Catholic landowning class entirely.

He became Lord Chancellor of Ireland in 1703 and then Lord Chief Justice of the Queen's Bench from 1711 to 1714, after being dismissed in 1707 for his opposition to the proposed repeal of the sacramental test for religious dissenters in that year. He escaped impeachment when his great patron Ormonde defected to the Jacobite cause in 1715 and fled to France, due to lack of hard evidence of his complicity in Ormonde's treason.

== Publications ==
He was the author of an early history of Ireland as regarded from the standpoint of the New English; Hibernia Anglicana, or, The History of Ireland (1689–90), (called 'trite' by Oxford Dictionary of National Biography); purporting to be the first chronological history of Ireland, and incidentally attacking "the ridiculous stories which they have publish of the Firbolgs and Tuah-de-danans". When Aodh Buí Mac Cruitín, hereditary poet to the O'Briens of Thomond and a representative of the Gaelic literati, in the preface of 'A Brief Discourse in Vindication of the Antiquity of Ireland', published in 1717, refuted some of the statements made in 'Hibernia Anglicana', Cox had him imprisoned in New Gate prison for one year.

== Later years ==
He lived 20 years in retirement before his death, from apoplexy, in the Great Hall of the Royal Hospital, Kilmainham.

He devoted much effort in his later years to improving the town of Dunmanway: he obtained a royal charter to hold fairs and market days in the town and did much to encourage the local flax industry. Thanks largely to his efforts, by the time of his death Dunmanway was a flourishing little town of some 600 citizens.

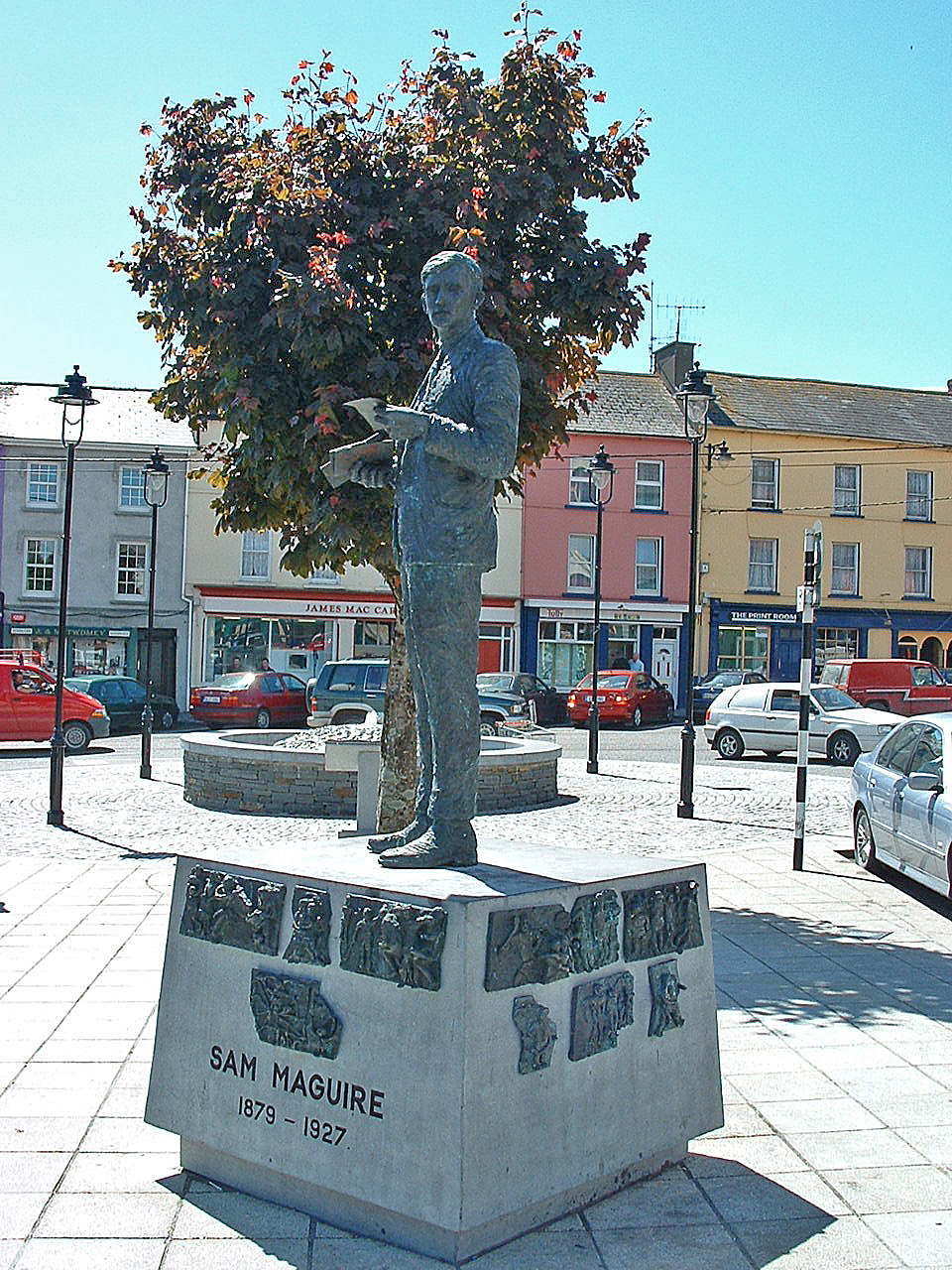
Dunmanway, County Cork, present-day: Sir Richard Cox was the town's first important patron

== Personal life ==
He was married to Mary Bourne, daughter of John Bourne, on 26 February 1674. She was born in 1658 in County Cork, Ireland, and died on 1 June 1715. Cox praised her as a very good wife while admitting frankly that he might not have married her if he had known how small her fortune was (this was the cause of a bitter family quarrel). They had numerous children: Cox himself mentions twenty-one, though only fifteen can be identified with certainty, some of whom died in infancy. Of those (probably seven in number, two sons and five daughters) who reached adulthood, the eldest son, also Richard, predeceased his father. A younger son, Michael, was Archbishop of Cashel from 1754 to 1779, and built a magnificent mansion, Castletown Cox, which still exists. The eldest daughter Amy married Sir William Mansel, the seventh of the Mansel baronets in 1700, and had five children, including Sir Richard Mansel, 8th Baronet. Her sister Mary married Arthur Riggs in 1701; after his death, she remarried Rev. Nicholas Skolfield, Vicar of Drinagh.

Cox's letters give vivid evidence of a lively and charming personality: he welcomes additions to his numerous offspring, describes the pleasures of good food and drink, and his love of music and fine clothes. In character, he was strictly honest and upright and was in general considered to be a good judge, though his prejudice against Catholics meant that he cannot have been impartial in cases raising a question of religion.

Cox died of apoplexy on 3 May 1733. His grandson Sir Richard Cox, 2nd Baronet (1702–1766) succeeded to the title and estates.

Legal offices
Preceded by Sir John Hely	Chief Justice of the Irish Common Pleas; 1701–1703	Succeeded by Sir Robert Doyne
Preceded by John Methuen	Lord Chancellor of Ireland; 1703–1707	Succeeded by Richard Freeman
Preceded by Alan Brodrick	Lord Chief Justice of the King's Bench for Ireland; 1711–1714	Succeeded by William Whitshed
Baronetage of Ireland
New creation	Baronet (of Castletown); 1706–1733	Succeeded by Richard Cox
