= Recorder of Clonakilty =

Judicial office-holder in County Cork, Ireland

The recorder of Clonaklity was a judicial office-holder in pre-independence Ireland. He was chief magistrate of the town of Clonakilty, and a justice of the peace. He presided over all important criminal cases and held a Court of Petty Sessions to deal with routine criminal and civil cases every Wednesday. It was also his duty to keep the peace in the town.

Like other Irish recorders, he was not a Crown appointment but was chosen by the townspeople: in this case, he was nominated by three burgesses of the town.

In light of the population of Clonakilty (presently 4600, up from 3800 in the 1830s), the recorder's workload cannot have been particularly heavy, and the office might be combined with another: Sir Richard Cox, 1st Baronet, (later Lord Chancellor of Ireland), Recorder of Clonakilty from 1675, was also Recorder of Kinsale during the same period. Commander John Townsend, Recorder 1801-1837, who was also the Seneschal (i.e. the representative of the Earl of Shannon, the dominant local landlord), had been a naval officer for many years. We do not know enough about the other recorders to determine what legal qualifications, if any, they had, although a recorder in Ireland was normally a qualified barrister.

Like all Irish recorderships, other than two in Northern Ireland, the office of Recorder of Clonakilty was abolished by the new Irish Free State in 1924.

== List of recorders of Clonakilty (incomplete) ==
- 1675 Sir Richard Cox
- 1801 John Townsend

== Sources ==
- Courts of Justice Act 1924
- Journal of the Cork Historical and Archaeological Society 1896
- Lewis, Samuel A Topographical History of Ireland Published by the author London 1837
- List of Justices of the Peace in Ireland 1844
- Montgomery, Ian. "Cox, Sir Richard" Cambridge Dictionary of Irish Biography
