= Daniel MacCarthy Reagh =

Irish MP (died 1641)

Member of the Patriot Parliament for Bandonbridge

Personal details
- Died: 12 July 1691 Battle of Aughrim

Daniel MacCarthy Reagh, 20th Chief of the Name MacCarthy Reagh (c. 1640 – 1691), also called Donal, was an Irish Jacobite politician and soldier. He represented Bandonbridge in the Patriot Parliament and fought and died for King James II at the Battle of Aughrim. He was succeeded in the Chiefship by his nephew, Alexander, who himself was succeeded by Daniel's father's second-cousin, Finghin of Benduff.

== Birth and origins ==
MacCarthy was the second son of Cormac MacCarthy Reagh and his wife Ellen MacCarty. His father was esquire of Kilbrittain. His paternal grandfather was Donal MacCarthy Reagh of Kilbrittain. His father's family were the MacCarthy Reagh, a Gaelic Irish dynasty that branched from the MacCarthy-Mor line with Donal Maol MacCarthy Reagh, the first independent ruler of Carbery.

MacCarthy's mother was a daughter of Charles MacCarthy, 1st Viscount Muskerry. His mother's family were the MacCarthys of Muskerry, who also had branched from the MacCarthy-Mor line.

His uncle, Finghin, commonly mistaken as being his brother (see no. 125 in O'Hart's Pedigrees), was friends with John Churchill during the ascendency of King Charles II. It is through Finghin's descendants, that the family survives today.

== Raised a regiment for James II ==
In 1688 MacCarthy raised an Irish regiment of infantry in support of King James II during the Glorious Revolution.

== MP ==
In 1689 he was elected as one of the two Members of Parliament for Bandonbridge in the Patriot Parliament called by James II of England, which met between May and July 1689.

== Marriage ==
MacCarthy married Maria daughter of Richard Townsend, a Protestant. Daniel and Maria had two daughters who died unmarried.

== Later career and death at the Battle of Aughrim ==
He served in the Jacobite Irish army during the Williamite War in Ireland. He was appointed a deputy lieutenant of County Cork in 1690. He was killed at the Battle of Aughrim on 12 July 1691.

Parliament of Ireland
Preceded by Robert Gorges; John Read	Member of Parliament for Bandonbridge; 1689; With: Charles MacCarthy	Succeeded by Sir William Moore, Bt; Edward Riggs
