= Bandonbridge (Parliament of Ireland constituency) =

Pre-1801 Irish constituency

- Former borough constituency for the Irish House of Commons
- County: County Cork
- Borough: Bandon

1613–1801
- Seats: 2
- Replaced by: Bandon

Bandonbridge was a constituency represented in the Irish House of Commons until its abolition on 1 January 1801.

== Borough ==
This constituency was a parliamentary borough based in the town of Bandon in County Cork.

Following the Acts of Union 1800, the borough retained one seat at the Union.

== History ==
It was incorporated by charter in 1613 with a Provost, 12 Burgesses and freemen. It had a Corporation, the patron being Francis Bernard and the electorate consisted of 13 burgesses and 50 freemen. In the Patriot Parliament of 1689 summoned by James II, Bandonbridge was represented with two members.

== Members of Parliament, 1613–1801 ==
Election	First MP	Second MP
1613	Sir Richard Moryson	William Crowe
1634	Sir George Wentworth	William Wiseman
1639	Sir Francis Slingsby	Anthony Doppinge
1661	Robert Gorges	John Read
1689	Charles MacCarthy	Daniel MacCarthy Reagh
1692	Sir William Moore, 2nd Bt	Edward Riggs
1695	Francis Bernard	Edward Riggs
1703	Francis Bernard	Richard Gorges
1713	Francis Bernard	Arthur Bernard
1715	Francis Bernard	Martin Bladen
1727	George Freke	Stephen Bernard
1731	Bellingham Boyle	Stephen Bernard
1761	William Conner	Thomas Adderley
1766	Francis Bernard	Thomas Adderley
1776	William Brabazon Ponsonby	Lodge Evans Morres
1783	Francis Bernard	Lodge Evans Morres
1790	Broderick Chinnery (Note: Created a baronet in 1799)	Lodge Evans Morres
1796	Broderick Chinnery	William Ponsonby
1798	Broderick Chinnery	Robert William O'Callaghan
1801	Succeeded by the Westminster constituency Bandon	

== Bibliography ==
- O'Hart, John (2007). The Irish and Anglo-Irish Landed Gentry: When Cromwell came to Ireland. Vol. II. Heritage Books. ISBN 0-7884-1927-7.
- Johnston-Liik, E. M. (2002). History of the Irish Parliament, 1692–1800, Publisher: Ulster Historical Foundation (28 Feb 2002), ISBN 1-903688-09-4
- T. W. Moody, F. X. Martin, F. J. Byrne, A New History of Ireland 1534-1691, Oxford University Press, 1978
- Tim Cadogan and Jeremiah Falvey, A Biographical Dictionary of Cork, 2006, Four Courts Press ISBN 1-84682-030-8
- Leigh Rayment's historical List of Members of the Irish House of Commons. Cites: Johnston-Liik, Edith Mary (2002). The History of the Irish Parliament 1692-1800 (6 volumes). Ulster Historical Foundation.
