= Edward Corker (1636–1702) =

Irish merchant and politician

Edward Corker (1636–1702) was a Dublin merchant and politician. He was a Member of Parliament in the Irish House of Commons for Ratoath from 1692 to 1693 and 1695 to 1699. With John Waller he established a sugar refinery in Dublin in 1667.

He was the son of Robert Corker and Anne Jackson who were married in Prestbury in 1632.

Parliament of Ireland
Preceded by John Hussey; James FitzGerald	Member of Parliament for Ratoath; 1692–1693 1695-1697; With: Robert Gorges Thomas Molyneux	Succeeded by Edward Forde; Richard Gorges
