= Theddingworth =

Village in Leicestershire, England

Coordinates: 52.46545°N 1.01859°W

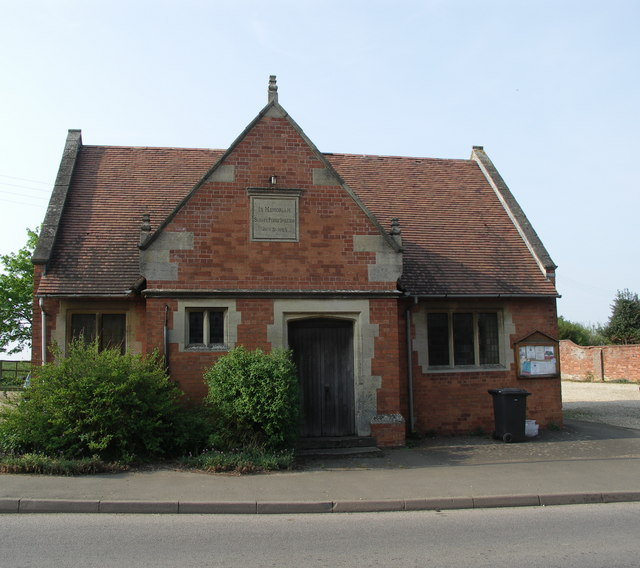
- Theddingworth Village Hall

- Location within Leicestershire
- Population: 217 (2011)
- OS grid reference: SP668855
- Civil parish: Theddingworth
- District: Harborough
- Shire county: Leicestershire
- Region: East Midlands
- Country: England
- Sovereign state: United Kingdom
- Post town: Lutterworth
- Postcode district: LE17
- Dialling code: 01858
- Police: Leicestershire
- Fire: Leicestershire
- Ambulance: East Midlands

Theddingworth is a village and civil parish in Leicestershire, England. The population of the civil parish at the 2011 census was 217. The parish includes the neighbouring hamlet of Hothorpe, which lies across the county boundary in Northamptonshire.

Theddingworth lies about 8 kilometres (5.0 mi) west of Market Harborough on the road to Lutterworth. It is on the north bank of the River Welland, which forms the county border with Northamptonshire. The Grand Union Canal passes within a mile. There is a church and Congregational Chapel. Theddingworth railway station was a former stop on the Rugby to Market Harborough line.
