= Magic: A Fantastic Comedy =

1913 play by G. K. Chesterton

- Original language: English
- Written by: G. K. Chesterton
- Characters: The Duke; Doctor Grimthorpe; Reverend Cyril Smith; Morris Carleon; Hastings; The Stranger; Patricia Carleon
- Genre: Comedy
- Setting: England

Premiere
- Date: 7 November 1913
- Place: The Little Theatre

Magic: A Fantastic Comedy is a 1913 comedy play by the English writer G. K. Chesterton. The plot centres on the conflict between a conjurer, a young woman who believes he really is magical, and her arrogant brother who rationalises everything. When the conjurer performs tricks that the brother cannot explain, the latter begins to go insane. The young woman and the other characters – a wealthy duke, a family doctor, and a local priest – attempt to convince the conjurer to reveal how he performed the tricks in the hopes of curing the brother of his madness.

The play was written after George Bernard Shaw pestered Chesterton for several years to write a play, believing that Chesterton's style would be successful on stage. Produced by Kenelm Foss, the play premiered at the Little Theatre in London on 7 November and was well received by audiences; Chesterton was reportedly nearly mobbed in the lobby of the theatre by an adulatory audience following the show's first performance. Critical reviews were similarly positive, with particular praise centred on Chesterton's employment of colour instead of music for dramatic effect. Several commented that he had excelled at creating an atmosphere that evoked evil throughout the play.

The play was successful and the script was published as a book by the end of the year, though Chesterton himself saw little of the profits, only receiving money from one of the backers. When Shaw saw the contract Chesterton had signed for the play, he instructed Chesterton's wife Frances to bring any future contracts to him before Chesterton could see them. It was performed over a hundred times in the United Kingdom and the United States. Despite the success, Magic is considered to be Chesterton's "one and only play", due to the lack of drama in his other published stage works; only one of his other plays was ever staged during his lifetime.

== Background ==
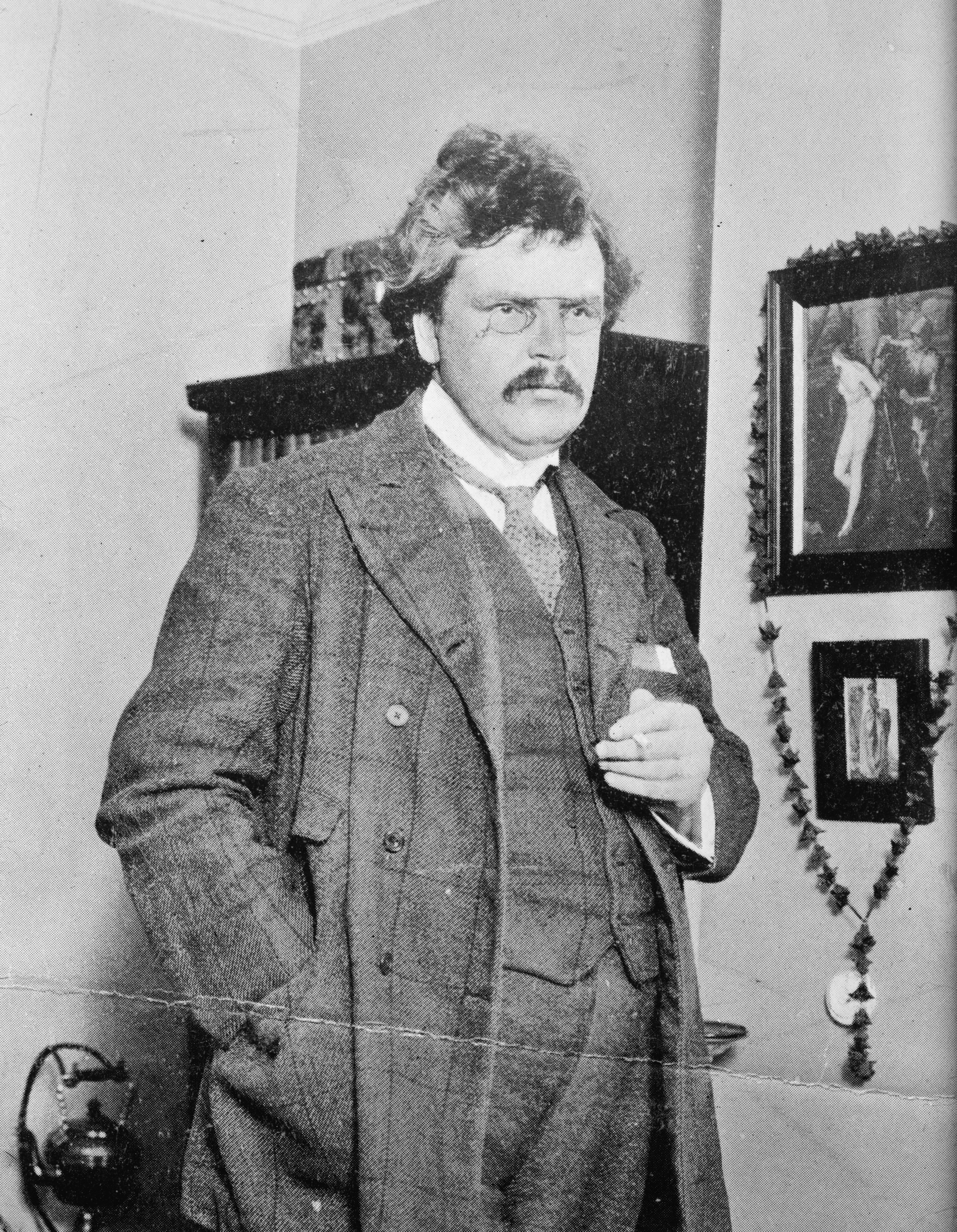
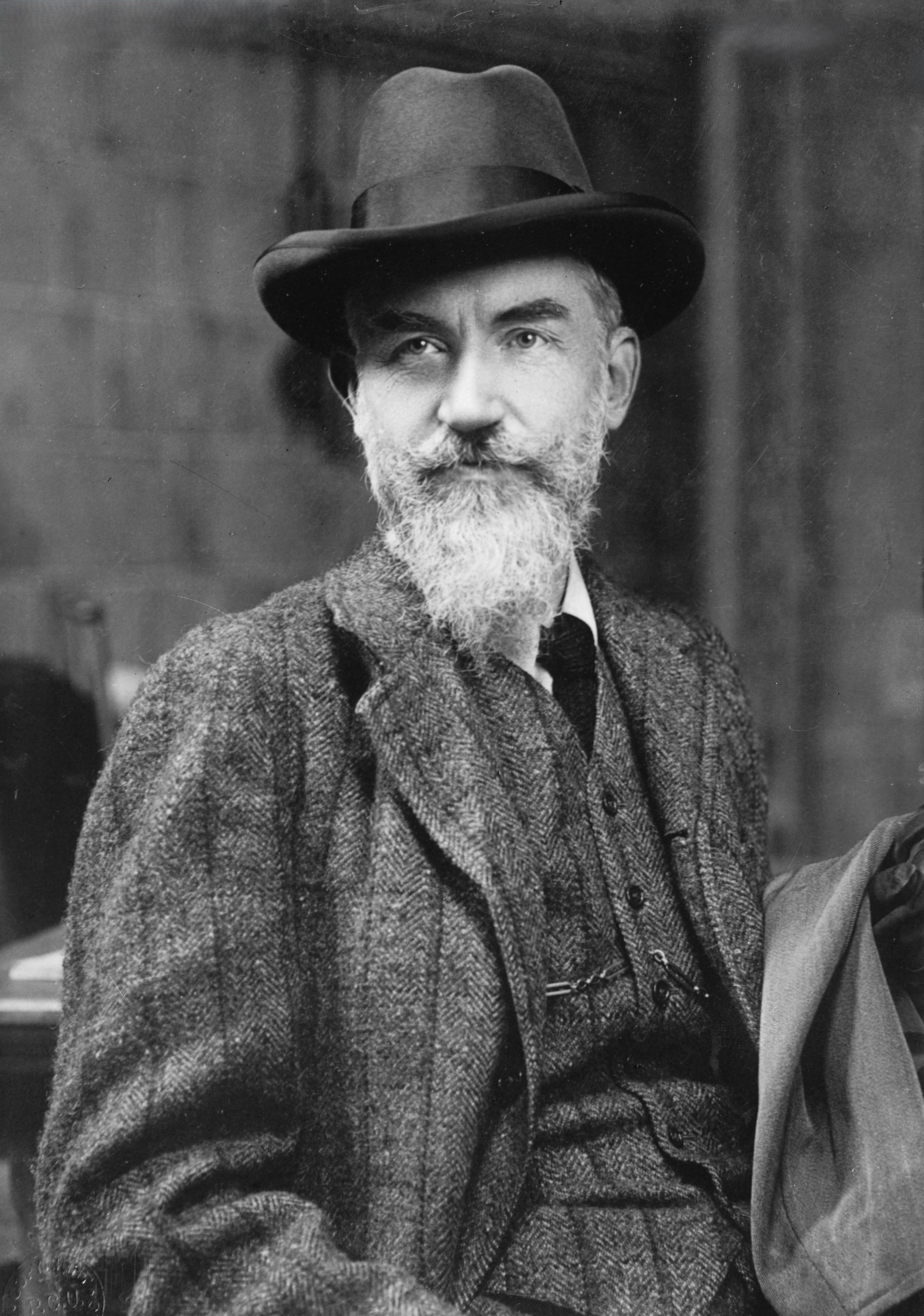
G. K. Chesterton (left) and George Bernard Shaw were fierce intellectual rivals, but also good friends.

Gilbert Keith Chesterton, better known as G. K. Chesterton, was an English author and philosopher who shared a long and intimate friendship with the Irish writer and playwright George Bernard Shaw; the two were intellectual rivals who differed on many topics, perhaps best-known through their series of public debates. Several times over the course of their friendship, Shaw attempted to get Chesterton to write a play. In 1908, he wrote a humorous letter to Chesterton, which reads in part:

I shall deliberately destroy your credit as an essayist, as a journalist, as a critic, as a Liberal, as everything that offers your laziness as a refuge, until starvation and shame drive you to serious dramatic parturition. I shall repeat my public challenge to you; vaunt my superiority; insult your corpulence; torture Belloc; if necessary, call on you and steal your wife's affections by intellectual and athletic displays, until you contribute something to British drama.

Shaw even gave several suggestions for topics and themes, but Chesterton did not adapt any of them. In 1909, for example, Shaw suggested a play called The Dialogue of the Devil and St. Augustine in which Augustine of Canterbury arrives in contemporary England and discusses life with characters based on politicians and writers of the day. Shaw went so far as to offer Chesterton £100 (equivalent to £10,291 in 2025) if he could produce a workable version of the plot as a play within three months. If Chesterton could do so, Shaw would retain the stage rights, but Chesterton would keep the copyright. The writing credits would not include any sign of input from Shaw and Chesterton could buy the stage rights back for £250 (equivalent to £25,729 in 2025) whenever he wanted.

In 1912, Shaw wrote Androcles and the Lion "to insult and taunt and stimulate" Chesterton. While the play was still a draft, Shaw asked Chesterton's wife, Frances, if he could come over to their home to perform an hour-and-a-half sketch of it for them and any confederates she could get. Shaw told her that he hoped he could "count on [her] ready complicity" to pretend she loved it to get Chesterton to produce a stage play. When the full version of Androcles finally premiered, the drama critic Desmond MacCarthy singled out Chesterton in a review, opining that Chesterton should write something similar for the stage. Hilaire Belloc, a longtime friend and collaborator, also believed that Chesterton would be successful on the stage; both he and F. Anstey proposed an outline for a play based on a work of Belloc's for Chesterton to dramatise, but it never materialised.

It is ultimately unknown what prompted Chesterton to write the play. Ada Chesterton, his sister-in-law, reported that the concept for Magic had been in the works for several months. According to her, Chesterton had been asked by a young unemployed man to write a play so that he could offer to stage it and gain steady employment from the theatre's management, which prompted Chesterton to begin writing the play down. She also noted that Chesterton had thoroughly enjoyed the writing itself.

== Plot ==
Smith. I accept the apology to my cloth. I am doing my duty as a priest. How can the Church have a right to make men fast if she does not allow them to feast?
Doctor. [Bitterly.] And when you have done feasting them, you will send them to me to be cured.
Smith. Yes; and when you've done curing them you'll send them to me to be buried.
Doctor. [After a pause, laughing.] Well, you have all the old doctrines. It is only fair you should have all the old jokes too.

— Act I

In a short prelude, a ditzy young woman, Patricia Carleon, meets a stranger in the woods who claims to be a fairy. The first act opens with Doctor Grimthorpe and Reverend Smith meeting each other for the first time. Grimthorpe reveals that the Duke is becoming the ward of his niece and nephew, Patricia and her brother Morris, and the doctor expresses concern that Patricia's tales about seeing fairies are the sign of mental illness, which runs in the family. Morris, a successful but novice businessman, arrives from the United States and is angered by his sister being allowed to meet strange men in the woods. The stranger trespasses on the property; Morris and Grimthorpe chase him, but Patricia recognises him and waves him in. He then reveals himself to be the Conjurer hired by the Duke to perform at an event that night. Patricia accuses him of ruining the fairy tale she was living in.

In the second act, the Conjurer looks over his equipment in preparation for the event. Patricia enters and the two equivocate over the concept of truth, leaving her less angry with him. Morris enters and leafs through the Conjurer's equipment, explaining how each trick works. He presses the Conjurer about a trick where a goldfish is made to appear but is really just a sliced carrot, which the Conjurer confirms is true before performing the trick and producing a live goldfish. Morris is flabbergasted but attempts to regain his composure. Smith, Grimthorpe, and Morris argue about religion and Patricia leaves. When Morris tries to belittle him, the Conjurer begins to make the surrounding furniture move around. Morris accuses the Conjurer of playing cheap tricks to undermine his position in the argument. When the Conjurer makes the red light across the street turn blue and back again, Morris flies into a frenzy, unable to discern how the Conjurer did it. Grimthorpe gets Morris to bed and the Conjurer expresses remorse to Smith about having done the trick. Grimthorpe and Smith argue over religion once again.

In the third act, Morris can be heard thrashing and babbling in his room while Smith, Grimthorpe, and the Duke attempt to get the Conjurer to reveal how the trick was done. They believe that if Morris is presented with a rationale, he will get better. The Duke tries to bribe the Conjurer, but he rips up the cheque and confesses that it was real magic. No one believes him and the Conjurer lambasts Smith for his unbelief and asks him if he even believes in God; Smith responds that he wishes he could believe. The Duke, Grimthorpe, and Smith leave. Patricia enters and asks the Conjurer how the trick is done. He derails the conversation and declares his love for her. He absentmindedly proposes to her and she accepts. She asks again how the trick was done. Somewhat defensively, he explains that he faked his tricks in the past, but later became able to control real demons. These demons attempted to seize control of him; he was able to wrest control back, but the demons still bother and taunt him. He explains that the room they are in is full of them.

The Conjurer departs for the garden to ask God for help. When he returns, he says that he has come up with a convincing lie to tell Morris so that he will regain his sanity. When the group asks what the lie is, the Conjurer refuses to tell them – and by extension the audience – because if he does, they will all choose to believe it instead of coming to grips with the idea that magic is real. The plan works and Morris becomes well again. The Conjurer says goodbye to Patricia, but she refuses his goodbye and thanks him for allowing the fairy tale to end by becoming true.

== Premiere and run ==
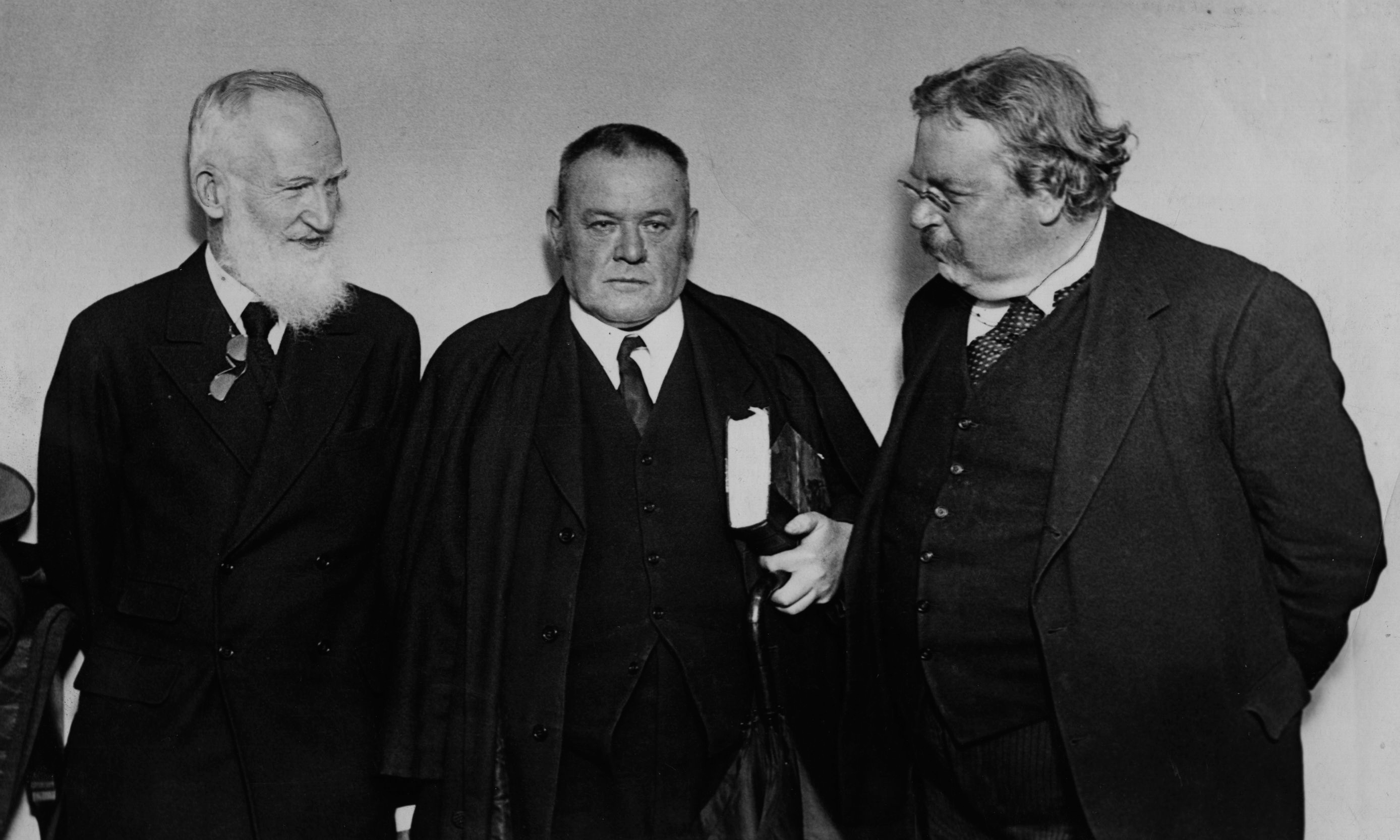
George Bernard Shaw (left), Hilaire Belloc (center), and G. K. Chesterton in 1927

Following a trial production four days earlier in Eastbourne, Magic premiered at the Little Theatre in London on 7 November 1913, produced by Kenelm Foss. The play was written with the Little Theatre in mind, which had a relatively small stage and only 477 seats; Chesterton narrowed the scope of the play, keeping the setting of the three main acts in one location, the Duke's drawing room, though the prelude takes place elsewhere. Franklin Dyall was the first actor to play the Conjurer; he had been recommended by Frances Noel, sister of Conrad Noel. Fred Lewis and Grace Croft were the first actors to play the Duke and Patricia, respectively.

Chesterton was pleased with the premiere's execution, laughing uproariously at some of the jokes in his own play, which one spectator described as "the best part of the whole evening". Shaw was at the opening performance and reportedly gave a standing ovation, shouting "Bravo!" and "Speech!" from his box. Chesterton gave a short speech at the end, remarking that although he was a poor writer, he was so certain of his beliefs that he felt compelled to convince his audience of them too. Although Ada Chesterton believed G. K.'s work was generally inferior to his brother Cecil's, she wrote a glowing retrospective about the night. According to her:

It was a memorable evening. Gilbert and Frances were almost mobbed in the foyer, and at every interval were eagerly surrounded. [...] When the curtain rang down, Gilbert made one of his wittiest and most delightful speeches. [...] Cecil and I foregathered in the bar with Fleet Street critics. Bernard Shaw, I remember, told Gilbert that he had a natural sense of the theatre, and insisted that he must go on writing plays and that a great career as a dramatist lay before him.

Following the premiere, Chesterton arrived at his newspaper's office around 6 pm. He left with his brother for a drink before dinner and the two were greeted by an enthusiastic crowd. Although Chesterton generally had an aversion to the telephone, he was reportedly so happy with the influx of congratulations he was receiving that he answered the phone himself, which his sister-in-law referred to as "extraordinary". Putnam's Sons published a successful book version of the script shortly after the premiere.

Although the play was well received, Chesterton received compensation for the play from only one of the backers, probably E. S. P. Haynes, and it was years before Chesterton was able to repossess the rights to the play. Chesterton was notoriously bad with his money and Shaw sought to protect the success of Chesterton's work from his poor financial management. After seeing the contract Chesterton had agreed to for the play, Shaw was furious and wrote to Chesterton's wife, saying:

In Sweden, where the marriage laws are comparatively enlightened, I believe you could obtain a divorce on the ground that your husband threw away an important part of the provision for your old age for twenty pieces of silver. [...] In future, the moment he has finished a play and the question of disposing of it arises, lock him up and bring the agreement to me. Explanations would be thrown away on him.

The play ran for over a hundred performances. For the hundredth performance, Shaw's short play The Music Cure began to be featured as the curtain raiser. Shaw had promised to write one for Chesterton if the play reached a hundred performances, though The Music Cure was only performed seven times.

== Reception and influence ==
Magic was popular with audiences and met with positive critical reception. In general, critics were surprised by how well Chesterton had adapted to the stage, despite never having written a play before. Others remarked that the use of colour instead of music during climactic scenes for effect was a welcome choice, as was his ability to create strong characters in the context of a live audience. In particular, the moment when the red lamp changes to blue was viewed as a "felt experience" by audience members years after their first viewing of the play. Other commentators praised the atmosphere of the play, noting that a looming sense of evil penetrated the performances.

=== Domestic reception ===
Although he had publicly feuded with Chesterton, George Moore described the play as "practically perfect".

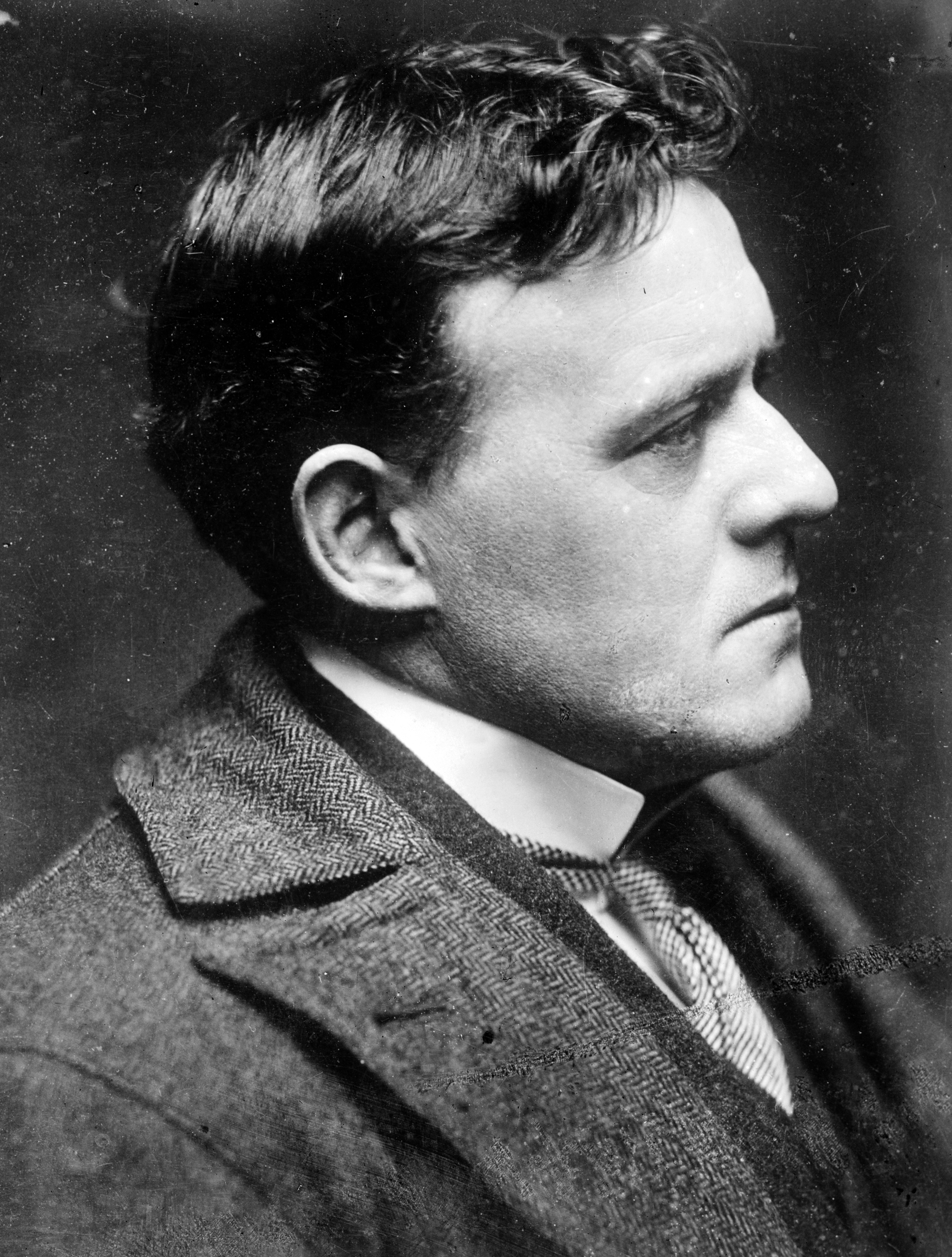
Despite his tight friendship with Chesterton, Hilaire Belloc said the play worsened the longer it went on.

Shaw praised the play more enthusiastically than any other critic. In 1916, writing for the New Statesman, Shaw called Chesterton "an artist of almost magical dexterity in language and casuistry". He finished his piece with a paragraph about Magic, writing:

I shirk the theatre so lazily that I have lost the right to call myself a playgoer; but circumstances led to my seeing Magic performed several times and I enjoyed it more and more every time. [...] Mr. Chesterton is in the English tradition of Shakespear [sic] and Fielding and Scott and Dickens, in which you must grip your character so masterfully that you can play with it in the most extravagant fashion. [...] The Duke in Magic is much better than Micawber or Mrs. Wilfer, neither of whom can bear the footlights because, like piping bullfinches, they have only one tune, whilst the Duke sets everything in the universe to his ridiculous music. That is the Shakespearean touch. Is it grateful to ask for more?

The English literary critic Patrick Braybrooke praised the play in his 1922 biography of Chesterton, calling it "difficult" because it is hard to discern the authorial intent. He remarked that the conversations between Smith and Grimthorpe were particularly good, serving as a critique of poor dialectic discourse, and that the play revels in what is unknowable. Braybrooke also remarked that Magic is "undoubtedly a problem play" and that the nature of the play lends itself to the term comedy as much as to tragedy.

The Irish novelist and critic George Moore, with whom Chesterton had feuded intellectually, (Note: Chesterton dedicated an entire chapter in his book Heretics to dispute some of Moore's beliefs.) gave it a stellar review. Writing to Forster Bovill on 27 November 1913, Moore stated:

I followed the comedy of Magic from the first line to the last with interest and appreciation, and I am not exaggerating when I say that I think of all modern plays I like it the best. Mr. Chesterton wished to express an idea and his construction and his dialogue are the best that he could have chosen for the expression of that idea; therefore, I look upon the play as practically perfect.

The Irish-American writer Frank Harris, despite his own disagreements with Chesterton, also gave the play a positive review. In his series of books called Contemporary Portraits, he wrote positively about the play. In the second series, he wrote that "London took 'Magic,' and Chesterton to its heart of hearts" and that the play "had more than a success of esteem". He praised the play for having been one that he believed grew in value over time, remarking that the play was remarkably consistent and had a well-orchestrated climax. In the third series, Harris wrote that Magic was a "noble play" which was "splendidly rendered". He similarly praised the use of colour and stage effects to create a strong atmosphere that suggests that something "incommunicable" is present.

William Archer and A. B. Walkley were less impressed. Archer, writing for The Star, called Chesterton "elusive and tricksy" and contrasted Chesterton negatively with Shaw. Walkley, on the other hand, called the play's central thesis "fly-blown" and wrote that the topic had no place in the theatre in his piece for The Times. H. W. Massingham, in a review for The Nation, took issue with the topic, arguing that it "seems chiefly calculated to re-enshroud men's minds" and called for Chesterton to "cheer up" and stop romanticising the Middle Ages. Despite his close friendship and literary collaboration with Chesterton, Hilaire Belloc reportedly hated the play, finding it to worsen progressively as it went on. He questioned Chesterton's use of theatre as a medium when its speeches seemed alien to it.

A writer for the socialist newspaper The Clarion gave a positive review of the play in general, but questioned whether anything it had set out to answer had been answered at all. G. S. Street gave a positive review in The New Witness, but called the play unambitious, petitioning Chesterton to take the art form more seriously. Desmond MacCarthy found the first act "admirably good", though he found the religious element of the play poorly introduced and argued that the play seems to advocate "swallowing practically anything". When Chesterton had called his play "amateurish" during his curtain speech at the premiere, MacCarthy lamented that he wished "other people's acts were as amateurish" as Magic.

=== Reception abroad ===
Once the play had made landfall in the United States, Lawrence Gilman saw the play at Maxine Elliott's Theatre in New York City. Writing for The North American Review, he gave spectacular praise to the show, calling Chesterton "the perfect reincarnation of a Hebrew prophet, with a passionate and thunderous ecstasy" and "an amazing man!" Gilman's only critique was what he felt was the over-explanation of the Conjurer's past, signalling that Chesterton needed to trust the "mystical integrity of his parable" more.

In Germany, the play received positive press following a production there. Many reviewers saw the influence of Shaw in Chesterton's work, and several remarked that Chesterton had surpassed him.

=== Influence ===
Ingmar Bergman's staging of the play met with critical success and later influenced his film The Magician.

Magic remained somewhat influential after its original run. During the First World War, James Joyce chose Magic as one of the first plays to be performed in his English-language theatre company in Zurich. Gearóid Ó Lochlainn and Toto Cogley staged the play in February 1926 through the Dublin Drama League, an offshoot of the Abbey Theatre. In her directorial debut, the Irish director Shelah Richards staged Magic at the Gate Theatre in Dublin in 1935. During Chesterton's 1931 lecture tour of the United States, his secretary Dorothy Collins met with a Hollywood executive to try and drum up business for Chesterton. The executive expressed interest in buying the film rights for the play for £4,000 (equivalent to £235,586 in 2025); at the time, Chesterton was only making about £100 (equivalent to £5,890 in 2025) per university lecture.

The play later went on to influence the Swedish director Ingmar Bergman, who staged it in Sweden in 1947 under the name Magi (Note: Originally entitled Trolldom ('Witchcraft').) at the Gothenburg City Theatre. The stage design was done by Carl Ström and the play starred Anders Ek as the Conjurer opposite Gertrud Fridh as Patricia. However, the play struggled due to its double-feature composition; it was overshadowed by the popularity of a staging of Thornton Wilder's one-act play The Long Christmas Dinner. Although he was criticised for his impractical stage effects, Bergman met with critical success and was praised for his visually imaginative design, such as using dimmed lighting to signal scene changes instead of the more traditional curtain. The Swedish playwright and critic Ebbe Linde described Bergman's staging of the play as having "more than enough dynamics and boldness for a genius" and called the production a "spellbinding metamorphosis". Bergman was likely inspired by the play when he created the 1958 horror film The Magician.

=== Within Chesterton's oeuvre ===
Chesterton's portrait in a 1914 copy of Magic

The Chesterton scholar Denis J. Conlon notes that, although Chesterton had not converted to Catholicism yet, the play seems to indicate that he believed something in the universe worked on behalf of evil. The Swedish literary scholar Birgitta Steene describes the play as an extension of Chesterton's book Orthodoxy, itself a criticism of moral relativism and the moral cowardice of those who defend strict rationalism. For Steene, "Chesterton gave voice to a demand for absolute faith, even to the point of absurdity". Chesterton's biographer Ian Ker calls it "a dramatic and autobiographical defence of the supernatural" which reflects in part Chesterton's youthful interest in spiritualism. Chesterton himself remarked: "It is a bad play, because it was a good short story."

Although Chesterton later wrote other pieces for the stage, Magic is sometimes referred to as Chesterton's "one and only play", especially since few have referred to his 1927 stage essay – The Judgment of Dr. Johnson, about Samuel Johnson – as a drama. The Judgment of Dr. Johnson was eventually staged at the Arts Theatre in 1932 and received better reviews than Magic, though it did not lead to further success. Chesterton did, however, write other plays. In 1914, he attempted to have his novel The Flying Inn adapted for the stage, but it was never performed as such. In 1932, Chesterton wrote a play The Surprise, which was not published until 1952 and not performed until 1953, well after Chesterton's death in 1936. Conlon believes that it is possible that up to ten of Chesterton's plays remain unpublished; following his death, several of his unpublished manuscripts were given to the British Library, but they were never catalogued and have not been made public.
