= Hilaire Belloc and G. K. Chesterton =

Relationship between two authors

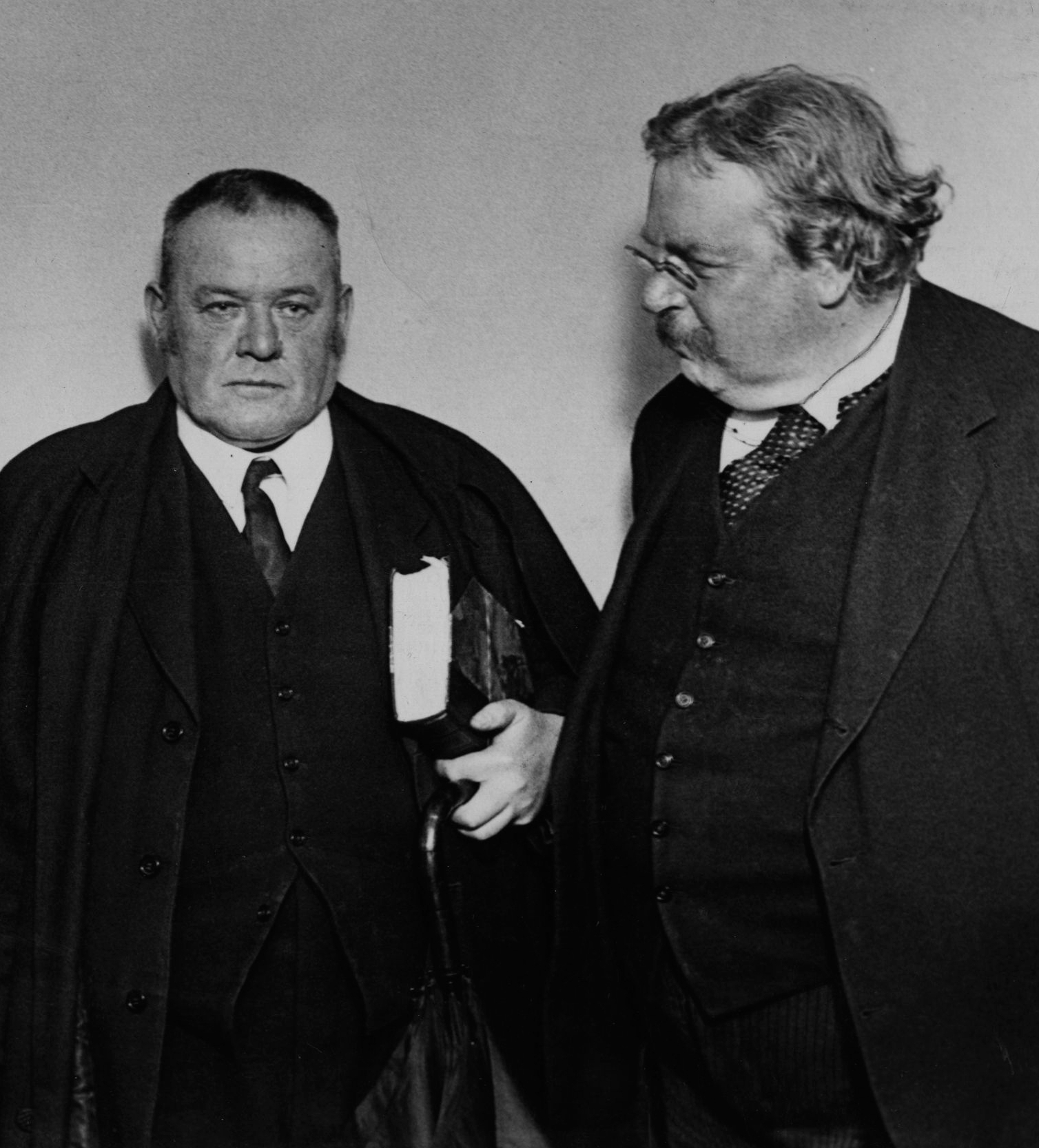
Hilaire Belloc (left) and G. K. Chesterton in 1927

The French-English polemicist Hilaire Belloc and the English author G. K. Chesterton were lifelong friends, collaborators, and intellectual allies. The two were considered inseparable and complementary forces until Chesterton's death in 1936. The pair were probably first introduced at some point in 1900, though the full circumstances in which they first met are somewhat obscure, including who introduced them. By 1908, their friendship was so impenetrable and their views so aligned that George Bernard Shaw described the two as one chimeric beast called the Chesterbelloc. The two debated and communed with many well-known literary authors of the period; the two were especially associated as the public intellectual opponents of Shaw and H. G. Wells.

Throughout their lives, the pair remained ideologically aligned as anti-imperialist and anti-modernist voices. Steadfast critics of capitalism and socialism, Belloc and Chesterton championed the emergent socioeconomic theory of distributism, which argues for the widespread ownership of the means of production rather than the distribution of wealth per se. The two are largely responsible for the development of distributism as a distinct form of political thought, which later became an important element of Catholic movements in the English-speaking world during the 20th century. Aside from their treatises, the two authored novels and political satires, typically with Belloc's prose and Chesterton's illustrations. The collaboration came to a close with the publication of The Hedge and the Horse in 1936 shortly before Chesterton's death, marking over three decades of friendship and collaboration.

Belloc's influence on Chesterton is widely acknowledged by scholars, especially in Chesterton's political, economic, and spiritual formation. Belloc, a trenchant Catholic, was a large part of Chesterton's ultimate conversion in 1922. While Chesterton is generally considered to have been less influential on Belloc, he has been credited with shaping Belloc's philosophical style and popularising Belloc's ideas with his softer public image. Their contemporaries acknowledged them largely as inseparable and enjoyable both as guests and hosts, though generally Chesterton is seen as having been much more agreeable and kindhearted, whereas Belloc is viewed as confrontational and somewhat combative, especially later in his life. Several modern and contemporary commenters have opined that Belloc was an overall negative influence on Chesterton and accused both of antisemitism, though both strongly rejected the allegations and publicly attacked anti-Jewish legislation in pre-war Nazi Germany.

== Background ==
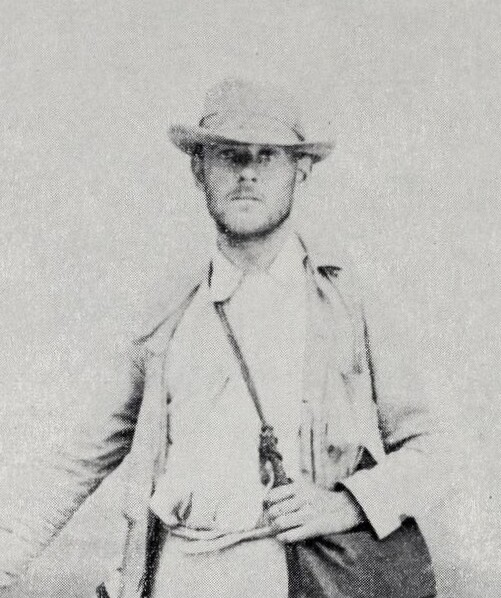
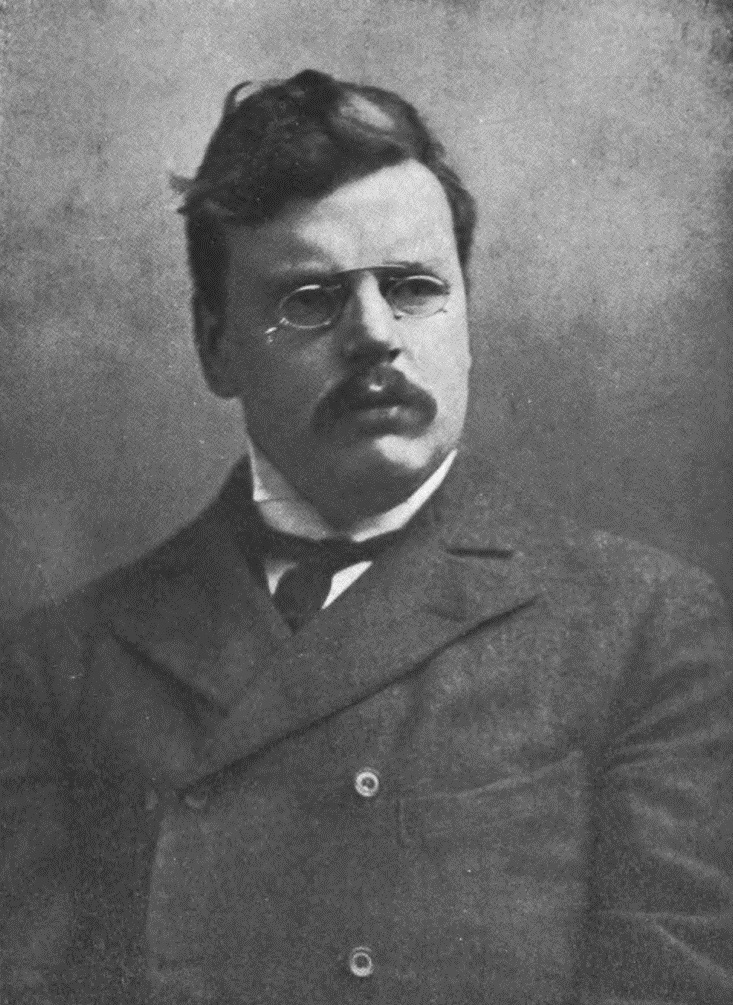
Hilaire Belloc (left, 1901) and G. K. Chesterton (c. 1902), shortly after they first met

=== Hilaire Belloc ===
Hilaire Belloc was born in the Paris suburb of La Celle-Saint-Cloud to an English mother and a French father of partial Irish ancestry. Following the outbreak of the Franco-Prussian War, the family retreated to England, ultimately settling in Slindon in the South Downs of Sussex. Belloc served as an artilleryman in the French Army before attending Balliol College at the University of Oxford. He was naturalised as a British citizen in 1902. Between 1906 and 1910, Belloc served as a Member of Parliament representing Salford South as a member of the Liberal Party.

=== G. K. Chesterton ===
Gilbert Keith Chesterton was born in Campden Hill in West London to English parents, though his mother was of Swiss-French extraction. Chesterton attended the Slade School of Art at University College London in the hopes of becoming an illustrator. While at university, he had a mental breakdown, which he later alluded to in his work. In 1895, he left his schooling to pursue a career in writing while working as a publisher's reader and editorial assistant. He is well known as the author of the Father Brown series of detective novels.

== Meeting ==
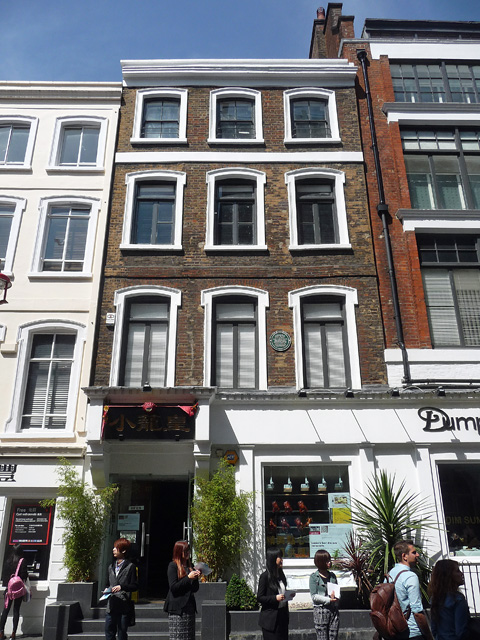
The former site of the Mont Blanc where Belloc and Chesterton first met (pictured in 2014)

Belloc and Chesterton first became acquainted with each other in early April 1900. Belloc was twenty-nine and Chesterton was nearly twenty-six. They both attended a political meeting at the art studio of Archie MacGregor in Bedford Park. The meeting was called as a protest by the opponents of the newly-declared Boer War in modern-day South Africa; Belloc and Chesterton were radically pro-Boer in the conflict. Both had been writers and important public figures for The Speaker, a liberal anti-imperialist periodical. Belloc was a friend of MacGregor's and had been invited to give a speech at the event; Chesterton wrote to his fiancée Frances Blogg about Belloc's speech in glowing terms. The two differed from their pro-Boer peers by believing the Boers were justified in their fight and that British forces should not be used to benefit the financial interests of foreigners, a stark contrast to the typical supporters who objected on pacifist grounds; Chesterton later recounted that the pair were "pro-Boers who hated other pro-Boers".

Chesterton then wrote to a mutual friend of his and Belloc's, hoping to arrange a more intimate meeting. The time of the meeting and identity of the mutual friend has been the matter of some debate; even Chesterton himself gave two conflicting accounts of the first meeting. Most biographies surmise that it was Lucian Oldershaw – a childhood friend, and shortly thereafter brother-in-law, of Chesterton's (Note: Oldershaw married Chesterton's wife's sister, Ethel Blogg, in 1902.) – and that the two met in 1900, probably later in the year. Others have suggested it may have been E. C. Bentley. F. Y. Eccles also claimed credit for the introduction, though Oldershaw claimed that Eccles tried to keep Belloc from reading Chesterton's work because he believed Chesterton had the handwriting of a Jew. Maisie Ward, however, warns her reader against taking Oldershaw's account at face value, describing him as having "the accuracy of a hero-worshipper". By contrast, the English biographer A. N. Wilson states that all three were present.

Even when the year is agreed upon, when in 1900 is also somewhat debated. Belloc's 1939 account puts their meeting "at the end of 1900", but "soon after" a rendezvous with some companions from Oxford in the summer of 1899. The British-American biographer Joseph Pearce argues for "very early" in the year, perhaps even before the MacGregor event. Wilson and Ian Ker disagree, basing their estimates on Chesterton's description of Belloc's attire – namely his broad-brimmed straw hat – as some indication; Wilson argues for "perhaps" May, while Ker suggests sometime in the summer.

Whatever the other circumstances, sources agree that the two met at the Mont Blanc, a French restaurant on Gerrard Street in Soho (now a part of the city's Chinatown), over a bottle of Moulin-à-Vent. When Belloc arrived, he had his pockets "stuffed with French Nationalist and French Atheist newspapers", and began the interaction by loudly proclaiming: "Chesterton, you wr-r-ite very well." (Note: Belloc reportedly pronounced /r/ as [ʁ], as in French, but otherwise spoke with a typical English accent.) Chesterton later described the meeting, writing:

When I first met Belloc he remarked to the friend who introduced us that he was in low spirits. His low spirits were and are much more uproarious and enlivening than anyone else's high spirits. He talked into the night, and left behind in it a glowing track of good things [...] What he brought into our dream was his Roman appetite for reality and for reason in action, and when he came to the door there entered with him the smell of danger.

== Early collaboration ==
I am delighted with what I have read in the Daily Mail. Hit them again. Hurt them. Continue to binge and accept my blessing. Give them hell.

— Hilaire Belloc in a letter to Chesterton on the essays that later became Heretics

The two met regularly for the first several years of the 20th century, spending significant time in bars on Fleet Street, particularly El Vino. At the time, Belloc and his wife Elodie lived in Chelsea, just a few yards from the Battersea Bridge. On the opposite side of the Thames, Chesterton and his wife Frances lived in Battersea. Chesterton indicated the two homes on a sketch map of London, with the centrally-located pub where they collaborated, indicated only with the phrase "beer excellent". The first collaboration between the two was a short book entitled The Great Inquiry. (Note: Full title: The Great Inquiry: Faithfully Reported by Hilaire Belloc and Ornamented with Sharp Cuts Drawn on the Spot by G. K. Chesterton) Published in 1903, the book was a political mockery of Tariff Reform and was incredibly unsuccessful, selling only thirty-five copies.

In 1904, the pair were regular attendees of a series of luncheons at the Mont Blanc hosted by Edward Garnett, where they interacted with other literary figures in London at the time, including Joseph Conrad, Edward Thomas, Ford Madox Ford, and John Galsworthy. The same year, Chesterton published The Napoleon of Notting Hill, which he dedicated to Belloc. Pearce argues that book's eponymous "Napoleon", Adam Wayne, is based largely on Belloc. Belloc's first novel Emmanuel Burden, also published the same year, (Note: Although the book itself was published in 1904, the narrative was published as a serial in The Speaker prior.) marked the second collaboration between the two, again written by Belloc and illustrated by Chesterton. A satire of the interrelationship between imperialism and global capitalism, the book was well-received; it went on to influence Rupert Brooke considerably and Lord Basil Blackwood, upon first reading it, referred to it as Belloc's masterpiece. Belloc himself, however, later recounted that he believed Chesterton's illustrations superior to the prose. In October, Belloc asked Chesterton to be godfather to his fifth and final child, baptised Peter Gilbert in Chesterton's honour.

When Chesterton published the essays that later became Heretics throughout 1904, Belloc was thrilled. When the book was finally published the following year, he wrote that "it is the only book of yours I have read right through".

=== Departure from London ===
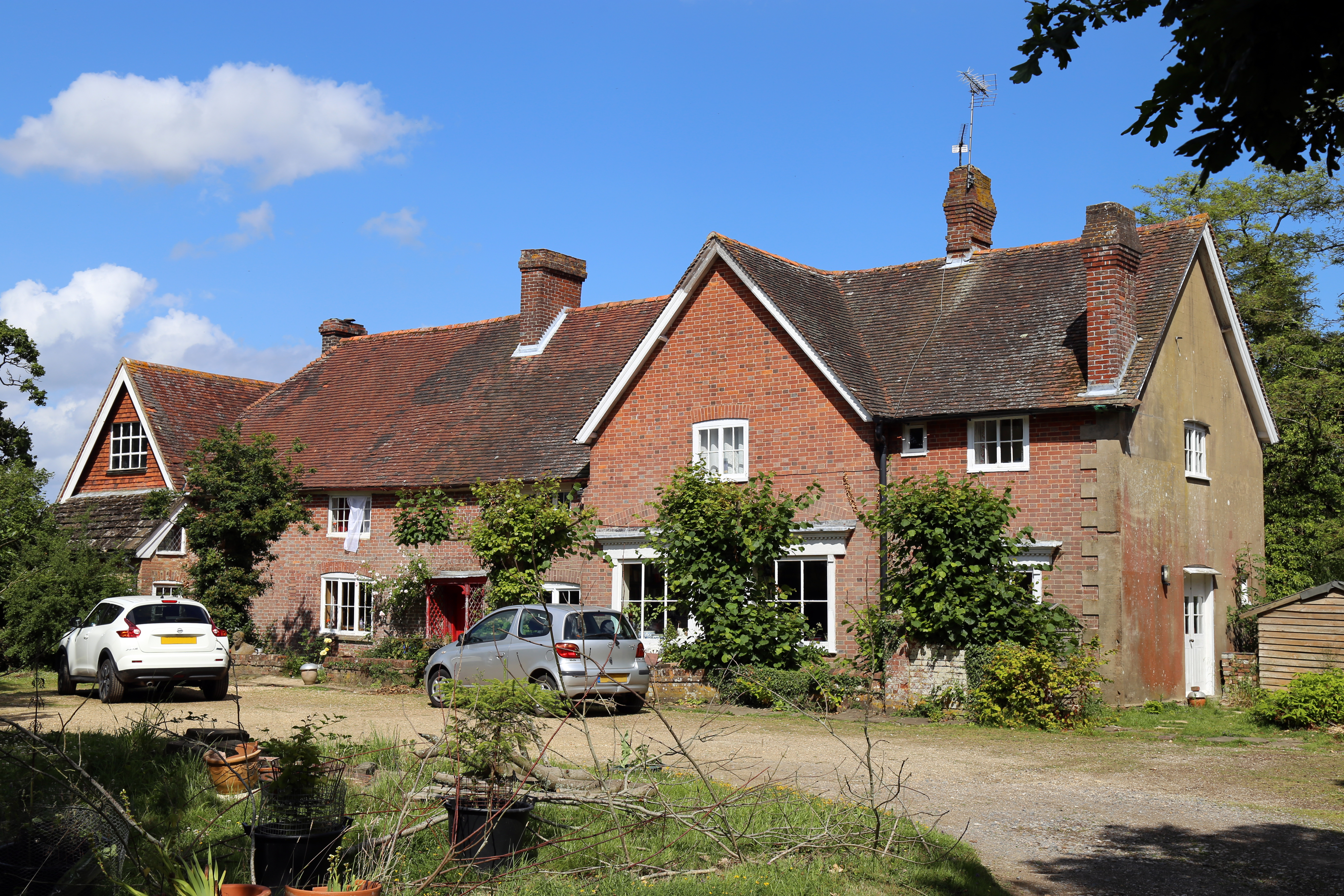
Belloc bought King's Land (pictured in 2015) in 1906.

Although they had spent a significant amount of time there already, in March 1906, the Bellocs bought a house in Shipley, a small hamlet in the West Sussex area of the Weald. The family bought the property, called King's Land, for £900 (equivalent to £94,615 in 2025), comprising five acres (2 ha) of land, a brick house, and King's Mill, a smock mill. Three years later, Chesterton and his wife also left London, moving from their home in Battersea to a house called Overroads in Beaconsfield, about twenty-five miles (40 km) west. Later, the two bought property next to the house and built Top Meadow, the home they lived in for the rest of Chesterton's life.

Chesterton's move from London made him difficult to reach. He had an aversion to using the telephone throughout his life and even his brother had difficulty meeting with him. The only person who could "run the blockade" was Belloc, who insisted on speaking with Chesterton's wife to negotiate a call time and ensure that either the Chestertons had beer there or that he would bring some on his way. Despite the grown distance between the two, Belloc visited him more than any of his other friends from London.

== The Chesterbelloc ==
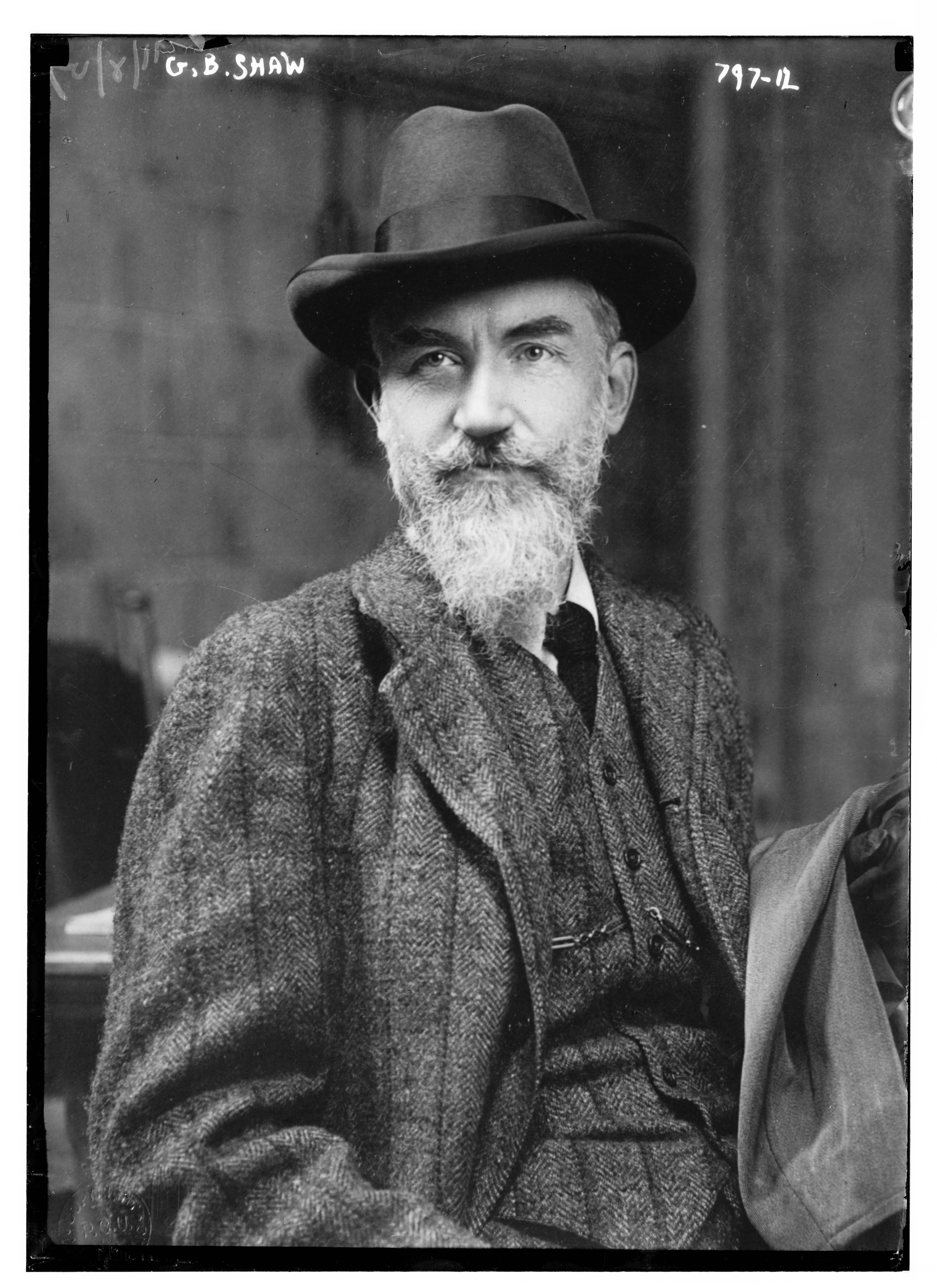
George Bernard Shaw (pictured in 1909) coined the term Chesterbelloc to describe the pair in 1908.

In 1908, The New Age published a volley of controversial essays debating socialism following the publication of Arnold Bennett's essay "Why I am a Socialist"; the event is now known as the "Chesterbelloc scandal" or "Chesterbelloc controversy". The editor-in-chief, Alfred Richard Orage, invited Belloc and Chesterton to argue against Bennett's essay without any editorial censorship. The previous year, the two provided the against motion on socialism during a public debate against George Bernard Shaw and Chesterton's brother, Cecil. The two agreed and published "Thoughts About Modern Thought" and "Why I am not a Socialist", respectively. H. G. Wells responded to both in the following issue and both wrote responses back.

On 15 February, Shaw, a friend and intellectual rival of the pair, published an essay entitled "Belloc and Chesterton", criticising his opponents though acknowledging their goodwill. In it, he described the two as a chimeric and elephantine beast which he called "the Chesterbelloc", an unnatural creature with "the front legs being that very exceptional and unEnglish [sic] individual Hilaire Belloc, and the hind legs that extravagant freak of nature, G. K. Chesterton". This quadrupedal monstrosity, resembling a pantomime elephant, had Belloc in charge and dragged Chesterton's hind legs in tow, but the creature was so malformed that the legs would get tangled as they moved. Thus, in order to move at all, Chesterton had to "make all the intellectual sacrifices that are demanded by Belloc". Shaw ended the piece with a challenge to Chesterton:

And now what has the Chesterbelloc (or either of its two pairs of legs) to say in its defence? But it is from the hind legs that I particularly want to hear: because South Salford will very soon cure Hilaire Forelegs of his fancy for the ideals of the Catholic peasant proprietor. He is up against his problems in Parliament: it is in Battersea Park that a great force is in danger of being wasted.

Chesterton answered the challenge in "The Last of the Rationalists" two weeks later, in which he remarked that in a debate with the "two most brilliant Socialists alive" and the "two most brilliant writers alive", they had both levelled personal attacks at Chesterton and Belloc instead of addressing the subject of the debate. Chesterton wrote: "My article may have been vague and mystical, but it was about Socialism; Wells's article was about me. Belloc's article may have been harsh or academic, but it was about Socialism; Shaw's article was about Belloc." He similarly attacked the substance of the article, writing that it was obvious that Shaw would be terrified of the Chesterbelloc beast: "it is Humanity on the move". The next day, Shaw wrote a personal letter to Chesterton in the hopes he would rebut the "Chesterbelloc" claims in a play, as he had regularly done before.

The four continually had public debates or exchanged of volleys of articles at each other, with Chesterton and Belloc on one side and Wells and Shaw on the other. The four found themselves together in private debates as well. One of Chesterton's godsons later recounted that, at Chesterton's house, "those four giants – Wells, Shaw, Belloc and Chesterton – were shouting, interrupting each other, arguing and laughing". For The New Age, the debate was a total success; during the Chesterbelloc controversy, the magazine sold out twice.

== The Eye-Witness ==
During the January 1910 United Kingdom general election, Belloc narrowly won his reelection campaign by 314 votes, but he was growing increasingly frustrated with party politics. When it became clear that another election was on the horizon in December, Belloc announced he would not run for re-election again; in his exit speech, he reiterated his intense distaste. The following February, he and Chesterton's brother Cecil authored a controversial book entitled The Party System which lambasted party politics as an undemocratic institution masquerading as a democratic one. Soon thereafter, with the financial assistance of primarily Charles Granville, Belloc and Cecil Chesterton began a weekly muckraker paper to promulgate their ideas, with Belloc as editor-in-chief and Cecil as assistant editor. The paper was originally called The Witness, but G. K. Chesterton proposed The Eye-Witness instead. The first issue was released on 22 June 1911 and included contributions from H. G. Wells, Maurice Baring, Desmond MacCarthy, W. S. Blunt, and Algernon Blackwood with G. K. Chesterton, Bentley, Eccles, and others contributing in later issues.

In June 1912, Belloc resigned as editor and sold his stake in the paper back to Granville, passing the editorship on to Cecil, who renamed the paper the New Witness that November. Under Cecil's editorship, the paper began a dedicated effort to publicise the Marconi scandal and took a blatantly antisemitic turn. Cecil was ultimately found guilty of libel the following year after Godfrey Isaacs, an Anglo-Jewish businessman, brought him to court and was forced to pay £100 (equivalent to £9,976 in 2025). During the paper's coverage of the scandal, Belloc distanced himself from the paper further and disavowed Cecil's antisemitic remarks, writing that "detestation of the Jewish cosmopolitan influence, especially through finance, is one thing, [...] but mere anti-semitism and a mere attack on a Jew because he is a Jew is quite another matter". Following the outbreak of World War I, Belloc continued to rail against the paper's "Jew-baiting" tendency.

== Death of Elodie Belloc and World War I ==
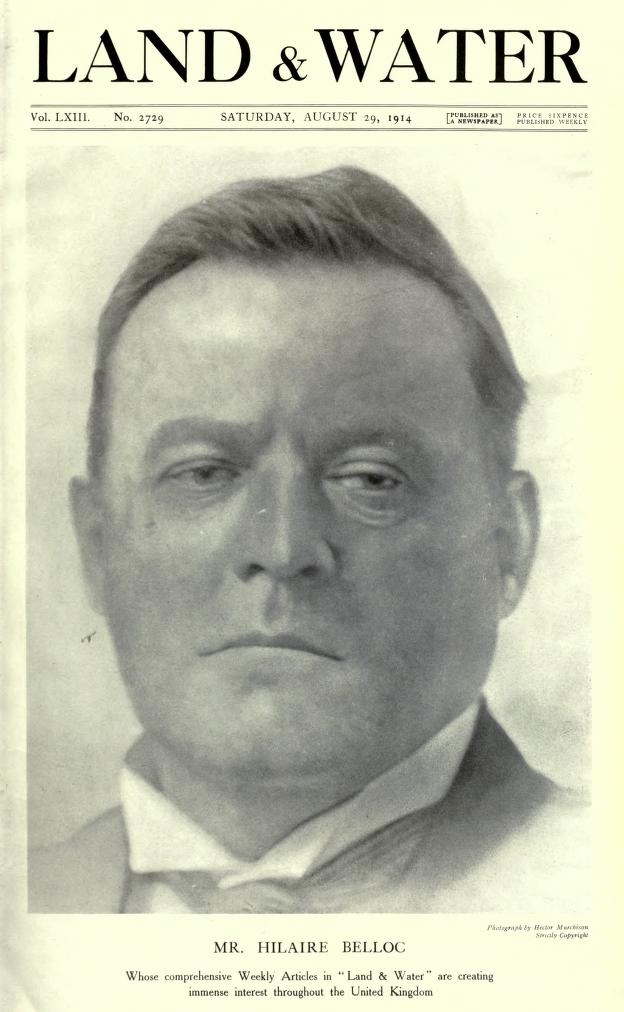
Belloc was a regular contributor to the war magazine Land and Water during World War I.

Towards the end of December 1913, Belloc's wife, Elodie, became increasingly ill, probably from cancer. Chesterton and his wife visited the couple on 20 January and again eight days later, but her condition quickly became worse and by the end of the month, it was clear she would die soon. Shortly before midnight on 2 February 1914, Elodie died in her sleep, aged forty-two. The next day, Belloc sent a telegram to Chesterton and his wife, who responded that they were "grieved beyond words". The two travelled to the Bellocs' home, finding him "in a disordered room, a broken man".

The following autumn, Chesterton fell extremely ill himself, falling into a coma on Christmas Eve 1914, only regaining stable consciousness the following Easter. Chesterton recounted in his autobiography that, although he did not remember it, the first thing he asked for when he regained consciousness was a copy of Land and Water to read Belloc's wartime articles. In 1915, while he was still in his coma, his wife wrote John O'Connor, a local Catholic priest, to pray for him. He responded by telling her that Chesterton had told him he considered converting to Catholicism some three years earlier and he was willing to come discuss the possibility of conversion as Chesterton's health deteriorated. Once O'Connor got the news that Chesterton was in extremis, he rushed to Beaconsfield to issue last rites, but he was not allowed in to see him; Chesterton's sickroom only allowed medical staff and his wife. Following his recovery, Chesterton remained reluctant to convert, especially without his wife, and continued to delay the formal reception into the Church.

Despite the hardships, Belloc continued to meet with Chesterton. During a Zeppelin air raid in the summer of 1916, the two were in London to meet with Maurice Baring and a Russian Tsarist military officer, a friend of Baring's. According to Chesterton, the two did not initially realise what was happening and continued talking later into the night. He recounted: "I am not sure at what stage we did realise it; but I am quite sure we went on talking. I cannot see quite what else there was to do about it." After Baring and the Russian had left, the two went for a walk across Battersea Park, listening to the air combat until the all-clear signal had been issued.

During the war, Cecil's longtime romantic partner Ada Jones wrote virulently antisemitic tirades for the paper under the pseudonym J. K. Prothero, which continued after the war. Wells wrote to G. K. Chesterton in outrage after "some disgusting little greaser named Prothero [...] made me ashamed of my species" and "made me sick" by levelling antisemitic tirades about Ford Maddox Ford (then Ford Maddox Hueffer) and promised "the whole outburst is so envious, so base, so cat-in-the-gutter-spitting-at-the-passer-by, that I will never let the New Witness into the house again". Chesterton wrote a conciliatory response to Wells, which he accepted and acknowledged he should have written to Cecil instead of involving him.

Cecil joined the British Army in 1916, marrying Ada the following year. Both Belloc and G. K. spoke at the wedding. He died of nephritis in France after a bout of trench fever, less than a month after the end of the war. Shortly before, Belloc's eldest son Louis was declared missing in action after the Royal Flying Corps squadron he was assigned to attacked a German convoy.

== Post-war activities ==
Following the loss of his son, Belloc became increasingly reclusive and his public interactions became more combative and jaded. Despite this, G. K. Chesterton took over the New Witness from his deceased brother and asked for Belloc's assistance. In 1919, Chesterton discussed the possibility of Belloc taking over editorship again, but Belloc was reluctant since the paper lacked intellectual diversity and he flatly refused to work with Ada, who was serving as assistant editor. Although Chesterton's influence moderated the paper somewhat, it had many of the same contributors and retained a level of antisemitic rhetoric, particularly from Ada, who was still writing under her pseudonym. Out of loyalty to his brother, G. K. had retained her as a writer, but Belloc was ultimately able to convince him to demote her out of political commentary and into drama criticism. With Ada out of the way, Belloc acquiesced, though his tenure like that at The Eye-Witness was short-lived. The paper also began failing financially, propped up largely by donations. Although he was facing destitution himself, Belloc sent £30 (equivalent to £2,256 in 2025), but asked that it be repaid quickly as he himself had incurred significant debt during the war.

=== Chesterton's conversion ===
Although it was clear to everyone around them that Chesterton would convert to Catholicism, Belloc believed he never would. Belloc believed, up until even a few weeks before Chesterton's ultimate conversion, that although Chesterton had sympathies for the Church, he lacked the requisite will for conversion, as evidenced in his letter to Maurice Baring less than a month beforehand:

People said that he [Chesterton] might come in at any time because he showed such a Catholic point of view and so much affection for the Catholic Church. That always seemed to me quite the wrong end of the stick. Acceptation of the Faith is an act, not a mood. Faith is an act of will [...] There is all the difference between enjoying military ideas [...] and becoming a private soldier in a common regiment.

By the summer of 1922, Chesterton had decided to formally join the Church and wrote anxiously to Belloc – whom he viewed as critical to his spiritual formation – to tell him. Additionally, Chesterton wanted to discuss the rationale for his final conversion and its timing.

On 30 July 1922, three days after Belloc's birthday, Chesterton was received into the Catholic Church. The reception was held in a small metal hut attached to the Railway Hotel in Beaconsfield, set up temporarily for the occasion as Beaconsfield did not have a Catholic church at the time. The hotel had allowed the ceremony to occur because the landlady was Catholic. The service was overseen by O'Connor and Ignatius Rice, a Benedictine monk and old friend of Chesterton's who arrived from the Douai Abbey for the occasion. Following Ronald Knox's arrival, the congregants waited for Belloc, but he never showed. Knox later recounted that Belloc's notable absence had "spoilt" the event.

Earlier in the day, Belloc had written a telegram to O'Connor telling him to meet him at Westminster Cathedral in London at 3:30 pm. O'Connor obliged and waited well over an hour past the meetup time, with Belloc having never shown, even though he had been seen in London that day. Six weeks later, O'Connor confronted Belloc about why he had sent the telegram at all. Belloc admitted: "I wanted to keep you from going to Gilbert. I thought he would never be a Catholic." Letters between Belloc and Chesterton in the days that followed indicate that Belloc had been going through an emotional turmoil; he wrote that "grief has drawn the juices" from his enthusiasm, admitting that his "reactions [were] abominably slow" and that he would write to him again "when I have collected myself".

Despite his behaviour, Belloc's letters to others indicate that he was ecstatic; he was "under the coup of Gilbert's conversion" and "overwhelmed by it", writing "the more I think on Gilbert the more astonished I become!" In one to O'Connor, Belloc concluded the letter with a caricature of himself as a blind man guided by a guide dog and tapping around a white stick for not having seen it coming.

Outside reactions to Chesterton's conversion focussed significantly on Belloc's influence. Max Beerbohm, for example, described the conversion to Malcolm Muggeridge as Chesterton having been "dragooned into the Catholic Church by Belloc". Wells was conflicted, writing "I love G. K. C. and hate the Catholicism of Belloc and Rome [...] If Catholicism is still to run about the world giving tongue, it can find no better spokesman than G. K. C. But I grudge Catholicism, G. K. C.!" In a letter to Baring, Belloc himself had predicted that Chesterton would be publicly humiliated by his colleagues for his conversion and that much of it would be attributed his influence on Chesterton.

== Final years ==
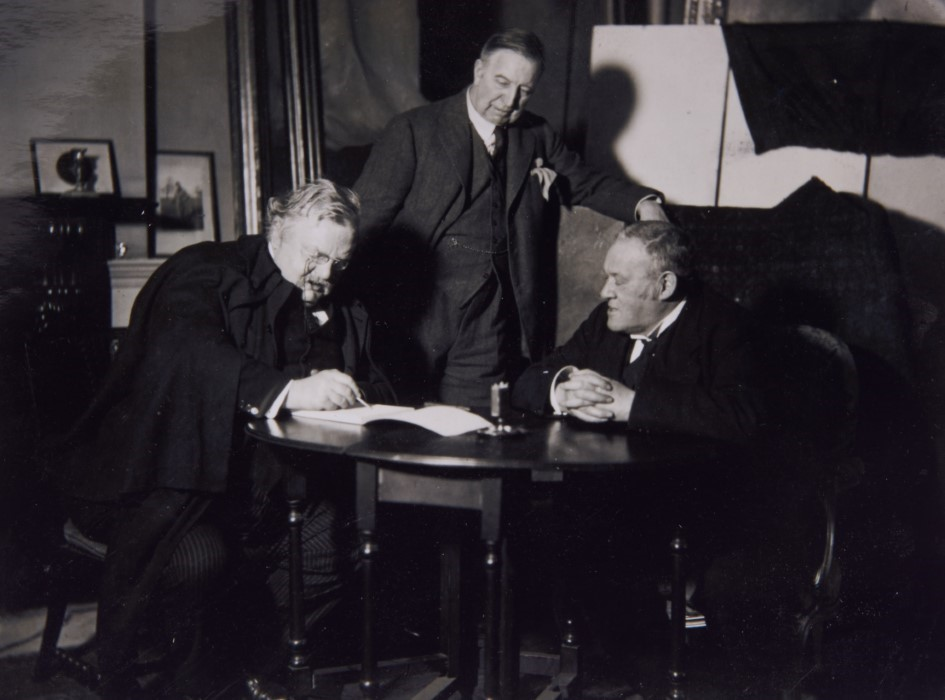
Chesterton (left) and Belloc (right) with Edward Grindlay in 1932

In May 1922, Chesterton could no longer afford to keep his brother's paper going, but promised to relaunch the paper under a new name. In 1925, he launched G. K.'s Weekly, which largely catered to the nation's distributists and Catholics but found positive currency among members of the Church of England.

After being contacted and persuaded by a group of attending students, Chesterton stood for election to be rector for the University of Glasgow in October 1925. Ada Chesterton, Knox, Bentley, and Belloc all came to support him during the election meetings, but Belloc defended him three times: twice at the Men's Union and once at the Women's. In his first speech, Belloc remarked humorously that everything he had ever supported failed and thus he urged the electors not to vote for Chesterton. In earnest, he argued that Chesterton stood for what universities stood for, in stark contrast to the usual politicians who numbered regularly among the ranks of the rectors who represented everything wrong with party politics. Accounts differ as to the exact reason, but Chesterton did poorly among the female students, losing to Austen Chamberlain by 374 votes of which only twenty against him were cast by men.

In early 1934, both men received letters from the Archbishop of Westminster, Cardinal Francis Bourne, that Pope Pius XI was honouring them with the Knight Commandership with star of the Order of St. Gregory the Great "in recognition of the services with which you have rendered the Church by your writings". Chesterton was overjoyed at the news, but Belloc allowed the letter to sit without answering it. Belloc's assistant Bonnie Soames asked him whether he planned on responding, to which Belloc responded: "Why should I accept an 'honour' from some greasy monsignore?"

=== Chesterton's death ===
On 14 June 1936, Chesterton died at his home in Beaconsfield. Belloc was inconsolable; he was seen crying uncontrollably into his beer alone at the Railway Hotel in Beaconsfield, where Chesterton had been formally received into the Catholic Church, and during the funeral told attendees that "Chesterton will never occur again". During the Requiem Mass for Chesterton at Westminster Cathedral, Belloc promised four different newspaper editors he would write an exclusive obituary for Chesterton in their papers.

With Chesterton's death, the editorship of G. K.'s Weekly fell to Belloc, who had mixed feelings about taking over. He wrote to his son Peter about the work, describing it as "anxious" and soliciting him for an article, stating: "Send us short stuff [...] under whatever pen name you use. We pay nothing: I get nothing: we all are in the soup: but it's great fun." Like his previous editorships, Belloc's tenure was short, lasting only about a year before he passed it on to Hilary Pepler and Reginald Jebb, but he promised to continue writing for the paper to help it stay alive.

== Views ==
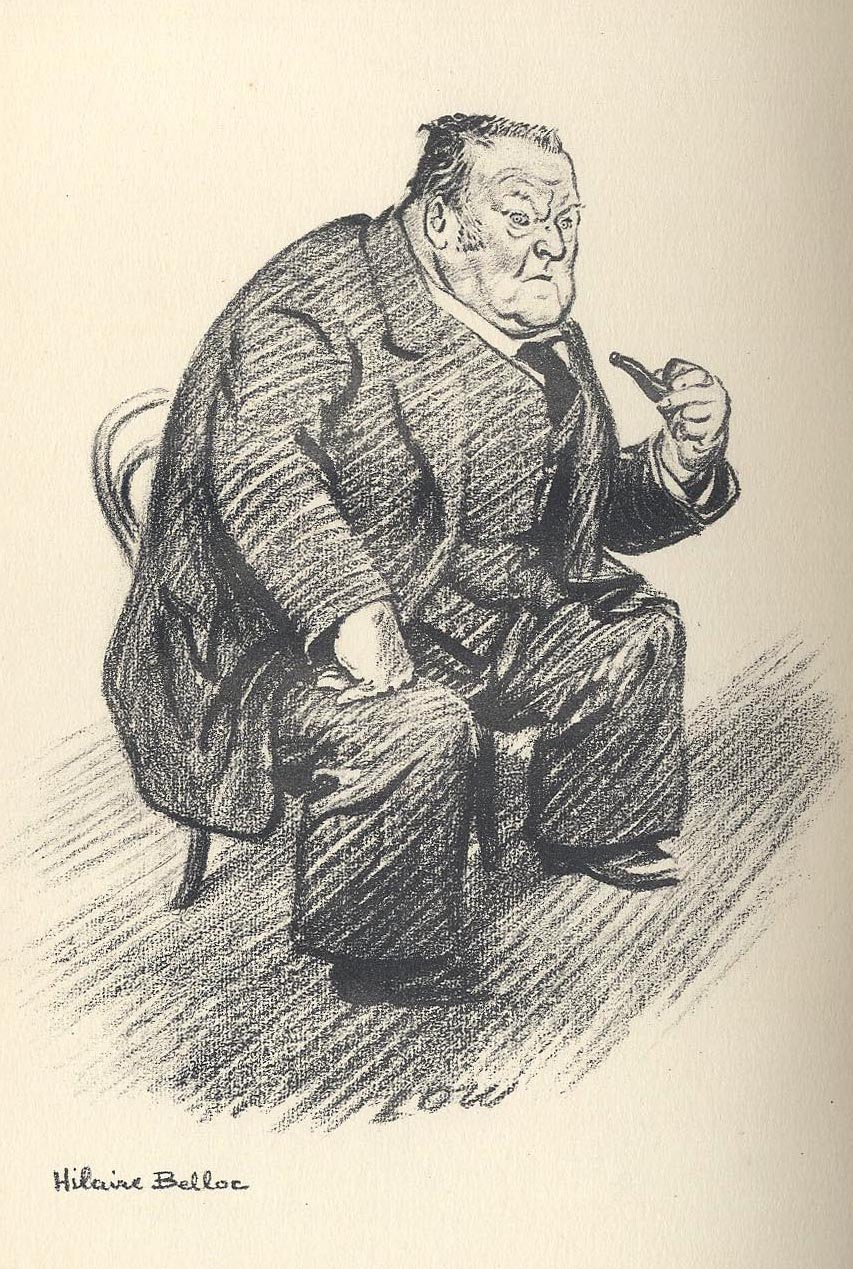
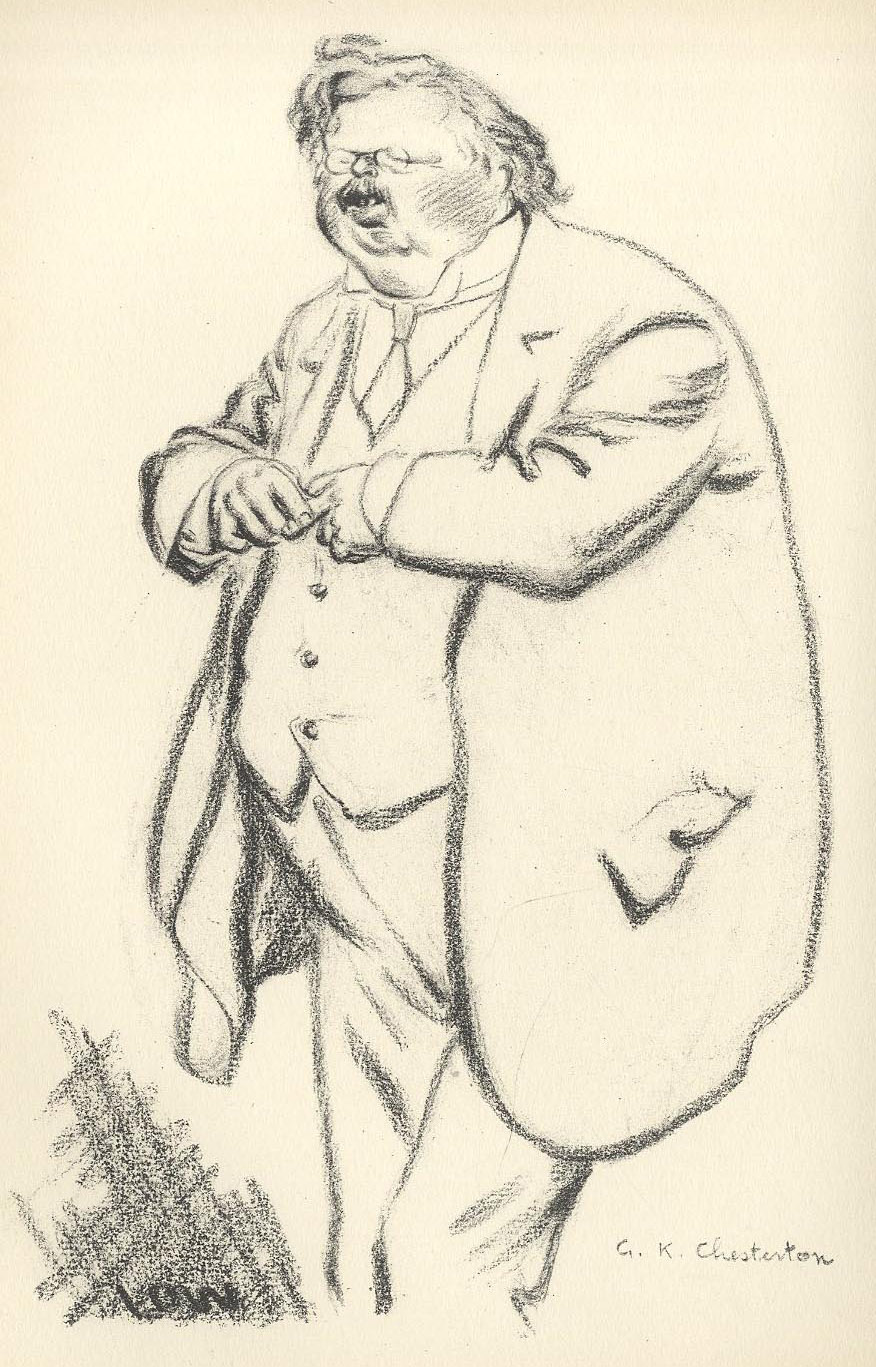
Caricatures of Belloc (left) and G. K. Chesterton, both by David Low in 1928

=== Economics ===
Belloc and Chesterton were both strong critics of capitalism and of then-rising socialism. Instead, the two were both supporters of the economic theory of distributism. (Note: Sometimes also called distributivism.) Distributism argues that "ownership of the means of production should be as widespread as possible", contrasting their ownership in a small class of owners as in capitalism or in the hands of the state as in socialism. It contrasts from other forms of anti-capitalist socioeconomic thought in that it advocates for the dispersal of productive property rather than the redistribution of wealth per se.

Originally derived from encyclicals of Leo XIII and driven by the tenets of the Catholic social teaching, distributism's development as a distinct form of political thought is largely credited to Belloc and Chesterton. A longtime follower of Cardinal Henry Edward Manning, Belloc was enamoured by the promulgation of Pope Leo XIII's encyclical Rerum novarum and it became central to Belloc's sociopolitical and economic ideology. Belloc believed that economic freedom was central and subordinated all other freedoms; if a person had economic freedom, he believed, that person would be more willing and able to defend other freedoms.

The central texts Belloc and Chesterton contributed to the ideas of distributism are Belloc's The Servile State and An Essay on the Restoration of Property, and Chesterton's What's Wrong with the World and The Outline of Sanity; like their other works, Belloc's perspective is "analytical and precise" while Chesterton's are considered more "artistic and fanciful". First published in 1912, The Servile State is sometimes considered Belloc's most important and best-known non-fiction work. (Note: Others consider his 1902 travelogue The Path to Rome the greater and better-known work.) In it, he first proposes distributism as an alternative to capitalism and socialism, and describes his sociopolitical outlook, arguing that socialist attempts to wrest control from capitalists would lead to the eponymous "servile state". This was a state in which compromise institutionalised the owners of capital to the state in order to keep working conditions tolerable, blurring the line between state and capital. The result is a socioeconomic political situation where people are compelled to work by positive law to produce for the coalesced state-capital minority and economic freedom would cease.

Chesterton himself admitted that Belloc won him over to the theory, writing in an open letter: "You were the founder and father of this mission [...] Great will be your glory if England breathes again". He described Belloc's analysis of the servile state as being "as strictly scientific as a military map is military". Within the English-speaking world, distributism is considered to have been one of the most important influences within Catholic thought during the early 20th century.

=== Accusations of antisemitism ===
Both Belloc and Chesterton were accused of antisemitism during their lifetime and interest in their beliefs about Jews has continued following their deaths. While Belloc was writing The Missing Masterpiece, for example, the two's correspondence shows that Belloc requested Chesterton draw the "swindlers and fakers and stealers [...] recognizable as Jews without mentioning they are". Pearce, however, argues that accusations of Belloc's antisemitism are "patently absurd" and describes Chesterton as "one of the first to speak out when the real testing time came". The Anglo-Jewish authors Anthony Read and David Fisher defended both in their work on early Jewish persecution in Nazi Germany, describing them as "prejudiced" but "not anti-semitic".

Belloc scoffed at accusations of antisemitism himself. During the Marconi scandal, he strictly denied antisemitism as a motivator, stating that although Jewish financiers made up a large part of the financial system he railed against, he sympathised with "a great mass of the Jewish race which is poor, and which is oppressed, and which is persecuted". Following the outbreak of World War II, Belloc remarked that "as for me, I get along famously with them". When interviewed by Hugh Kingsmill and Hesketh Pearson in 1946, Belloc remarked: "I'm not an anti-Semite. I love 'em, poor dears. My best secretary was a Jewess. Poor darlings. It must be terrible to be born with the knowledge that you belong to the enemies of the human race [because of the Crucifixion]."

The British literary scholar Bernard Bergonzi accused Chesterton of antisemitism as well, calling it an import of Belloc's and Cecil's views and arguing that it "disfigures his work". Still, although he died before the Second World War, Chesterton was horrified by interwar efforts by the Nazis against the Jews and wrote invective against it. In The Well and the Shallows, published in 1935, Chesterton castigated the Nazis for their unjust actions against the Jews and remarked that although he and Belloc "began in the days of Jewish omnipotence by attacking the Jews, [we] will now probably die defending them". In his final months, Chesterton echoed those sentiments, writing:

In our early days Hilaire Belloc and myself were accused of being uncompromising anti-Semites. Today, although I still think there is a Jewish problem, I am appalled by the Hitlerite atrocities. They have absolutely no reason or logic behind them. It is quite obviously the expedient of a man who has been driven to seeking a scapegoat, and has found with relief the most famous scapegoat in European history, the Jewish people. I am quite ready to believe now that Belloc and I will die defending the last Jew in Europe.

== Views on the relationship ==
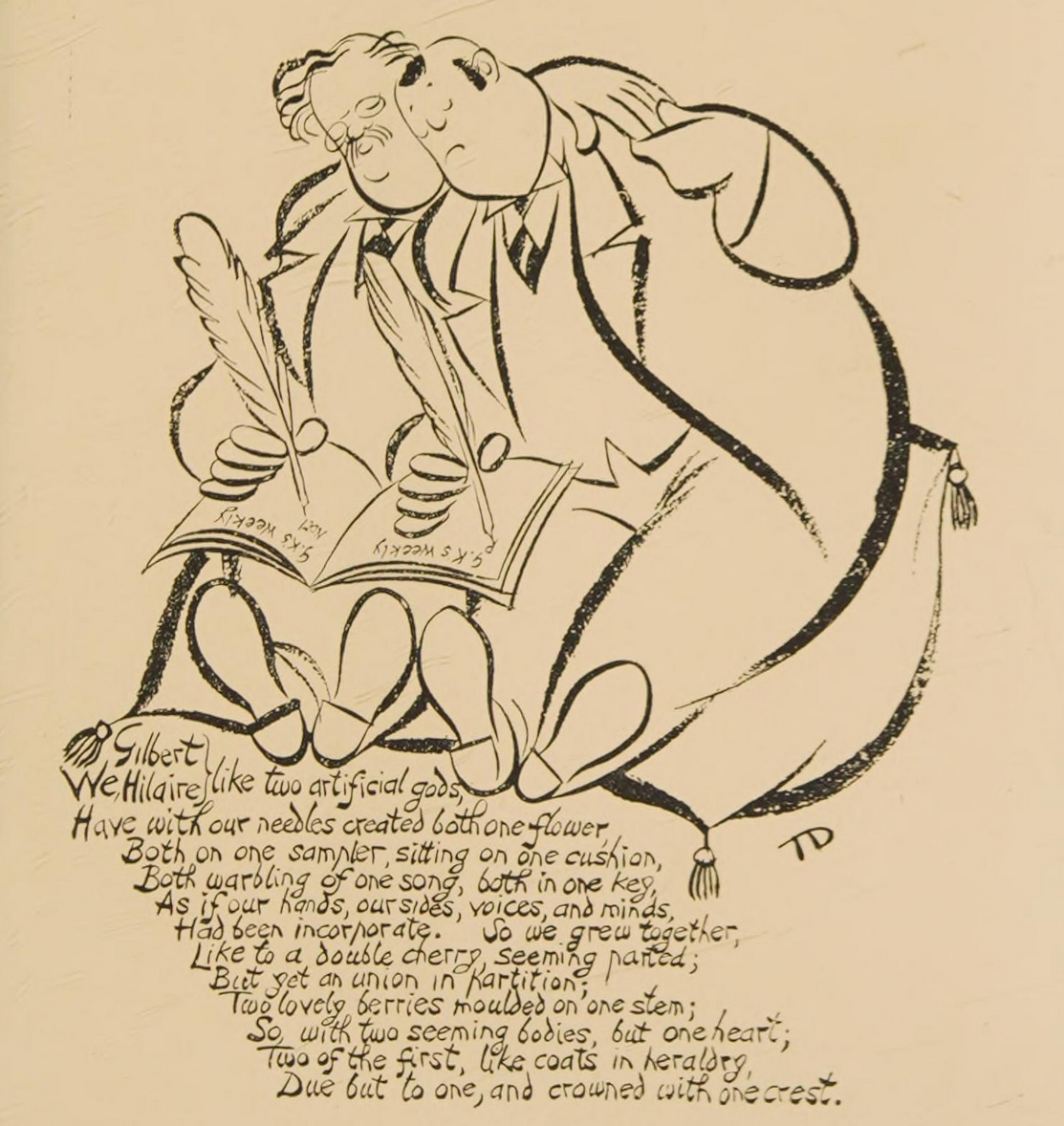
A caricature of Chesterton (left) and Belloc with a poem about their unity and inseparability (Thomas Derrick, c. 1935)

The relationship between Belloc and Chesterton has been the subject of scholarly study. Belloc and Chesterton have been described as central to the emergent Catholic intellectual and literary movement of the early 20th century. Belloc is largely credited with Chesterton's personal and literary formation, and Belloc himself told Maisie Ward that "the chief thing he had done for Chesterton when they first met was to open his eyes to reality". Chesterton's influence on Belloc's works is generally considered less impactful, though some have challenged this outlook.

=== Contemporary ===
During their lifetimes, Belloc and Chesterton's relationship was widely known among the British public. In 1905, Charles Masterman described the two as the strongest voices against reactionary Victorian literature found in the works of G. A. Henty and Rudyard Kipling, and for the classical liberal causes of free trade, anti-imperialism, and secular public schooling. By 1908, the satirical magazine Punch lampooned Belloc as a foreign and bizarre intellectual with a love of English beer unlike his "grimy", teetotaling Salford constituents; the magazine ended its piece by recommending his next book be titled The Man Who Was Thirsty, a pun on Chesterton's metaphysical thriller The Man Who Was Thursday. The English poet and journalist Edward Shanks wrote an article on Belloc for The London Mercury in September 1921, which described Belloc's works as "[resembling] Mr Chesterton, with whom it is so usual to compare him" and that it was impossible to think of one's work as separated from the other's.

The Irish essayist Robert Lynd described Belloc and Chesterton as a "literary comradeship" so intertwined as to be confused for Castor and Pollux, approving of Shaw's "Chesterbelloc" chimera. He writes that "Mr. Belloc and Mr. Chesterton, whatever may be the dissimilarities in the form and spirit of their work, cannot be thought apart from each other". Lynd describes the two as complete opposites in their writing style and disposition – Chesterton is "jovial and democratic" whereas Belloc is "saturnine and autocratic" – but in agreement philosophically. Similarly, the English Conservative politician Christopher Hollis described the two as equals in their oratory skill, but Belloc was "bitter and satiric" and his jokes "struck to wound", whereas Chesterton's jokes were "warm" and "kindly".

H. G. Wells, at least prior to his highly-publicised feud with Belloc, (Note: The relationship between Belloc and Wells soured considerably following the publication of Wells's The Outline of History, which Belloc pilloried in the press.) held both in high esteem; in his piece "About Chesterton and Belloc" written during the Chesterbelloc controversy, he wrote: "G. K. Chesterton, a joyous whirl of brushwork, appropriately garmented and crowned. When he is there, I remark, the whole ceiling is by a sort of radiation convivial. [...] Belloc I admire beyond measure, but there is a sort of partisan viciousness about Belloc that bars him from my celestial dreams."

Belloc and Chesterton had a close relationship with the English writer and cartoonist Max Beerbohm. He regularly lampooned them both in his works, both in writing and as an artist, but described them as "delightful men" with "such enormous gusto, you know, such gaiety, and feeling for life". The Australian-born English publisher F. J. Sheed recounted two well-known stories about the two, summing up the difference between them as "Belloc [is] rude to the polite stranger, Chesterton polite to the rude stranger [...] Belloc went about as if he owned the earth, Chesterton as if he didn't care who owned it".

Although George Orwell gave some credit to their works, namely Belloc's The Servile State, he was a regular disputant of the two. He satirised the pair in Keep the Aspidistra Flying as "Father Hilaire Chestnut", a Catholic propagandist. Wyndham Lewis and J. B. Morton both converted to Catholicism in the early 1920s in part due to Belloc's influence, but Orwell denounced them both as "simply the leavings on Chesterton's plate".

According to Dorothy Collins, one of Chesterton's long-time secretaries, Belloc's relationship with Chesterton was best described as a need. She later recounted how, often, he "would come in like a whirlwind" with the plot for a satirical novel, but told Chesterton "he could not possibly write the story until Gilbert had drawn the pictures". The two would then collaborate over lunch, finishing at teatime with Belloc emerging, two dozen drawings in hand.

Shortly after Belloc's death in 1953, the American philosopher Frederick Wilhelmsen wrote Hilaire Belloc: No Alienated Man, a reflection on Belloc's works and philosophy. In it, he describes the two thus:

Belloc saw things, but Chesterton saw through them. This is not to say that one is greater than the other, but it is to declare their fundamental difference.

=== Modern ===
Writers commenting on the relationship after Belloc and Chesterton died have grouped the two similarly to their contemporaries. Robert Speaight described the two as completely different yet complementary persons, writing that Chesterton's "imagination was stronger than Belloc's [...] but they needed the Attic salt of Belloc's realism; Chesterton's fantasy required Belloc's fact". A. N. Wilson has described the two as a natural pairing and opined that "with his zest for paradox, Chesterton saw in Belloc a man with whom almost everyone disagreed and concluded that he must have been in the right".

The American historian James R. Lothian describes Chesterton as Belloc's great equal as a man of letters and argues that Chesterton's larger and more cheerful public image helped to popularise many of Belloc's views. Lothian describes Chesterton as "Belloc's greatest disciple" and "chief in influence, in intellect, and in sheer talent" of those influenced by Belloc's sociopolitical and economic thought. He argues that Chesterton was more successful in promulgating Bellocian ideas by acting as a counterbalance to "Belloc's confrontational style", while also focussing on theology and philosophy where Belloc harped on the political and historical aspects.

Joseph Pearce has been critical of other biographies of the two's relationship, arguing that they "slavishly" accept accusations that Belloc was little influenced by Chesterton and that Belloc thought less of his companion's work than his own. He also argues that flat readings of dialogue captured between the two paint the relationship as between a domineering bully in Belloc and a sheepish victim in Chesterton, when in fact the conversations indicate nothing but good-humoured banter between two intimate friends who spurned the formality of their era. He points to Belloc's appellation of Chesterton as "a thinker so profound and so direct that he has no equal" and a master of poetic verse. Acknowledging Belloc's sometimes harsh criticism, particularly his panning of Chesterton's play Magic, Pearce argues that Belloc held Chesterton as an incredible talent and admired his intellect immensely.

The American historian Jay P. Corrin has described Chesterton as "infatuated" with Belloc intellectually as a result of having come to many of the same conclusions early on. Like others, he points to their drastic differences in writing and personal style: Belloc as "vain, bitingly cynical, and cantankerous" and Chesterton as "self-effacing and friendly". Beginning with the pair's anti-modernist and anti-imperialist positions, Corrin further identifies that early on the two had come to similar conclusions on morality and social organisation, including an idealisation of rural life and the centrality of private ownership in political and moral freedom.

=== Belloc as a negative influence ===
Several scholars and some contemporaries have described Belloc as a largely negative influence on Chesterton. Bergonzi, for example, has characterised Chesterton's view of Belloc as "hero worship" and described Belloc as "strongly, but not always fortunately" influencing Chesterton. He argues that Chesterton also took Belloc's views of history "uncritically" and wholesale. During their lifetimes, C. S. Lewis described Belloc as "always, on the intellectual side, a disastrous influence on Chesterton". By contrast, Edward Shanks argued that, while many thought that Belloc had shaped Chesterton's intellectual outlook, it was more likely that Chesterton "rather found in [Belloc] a confirmation of what he himself had already guessed".

The English historian Tom Villis similarly described Belloc's effect on Chesterton, but argues attempts to paint Chesterton as a "somewhat naïve literary journalist" undercut his agency in the partnership and his role as a political thinker. Corrin has characterised the unique aspects of Chesterton's political thought as a part of the formative basis of liberal democracy, while dismissing the positions more aligned with the then-burgeoning fascist movement as the result of Belloc's influence. Pearce dismisses these criticisms as dependent on the subjective ideas of the interpreter. He writes that the influence was fairly balanced, arguing that Chesterton improved Belloc in philosophy, while Belloc improved Chesterton's understanding of economics and history.

== List of collaborative works ==
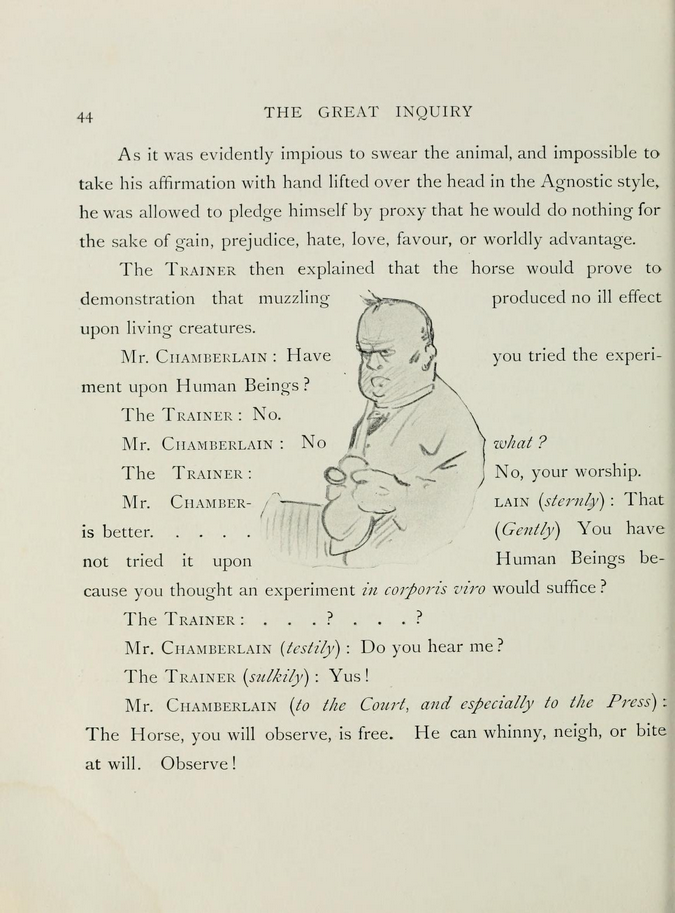
A page from The Great Inquiry, Belloc and Chesterton's first collaboration

- Belloc, Hilaire; Chesterton, G. K. (1903). The Great Inquiry: Faithfully Reported by Hilaire Belloc and Ornamented with Sharp Cuts Drawn on the Spot by G. K. Chesterton. London: Duckworth & Co.
- ——; —— (1904). Emmanuel Burden, Merchant of Thames St., in the City of London, Exporter of Hardware: A Record of His Lineage, Speculations, Last Days and Death. London: Methuen & Co.
- ——; —— (1912). The Green Overcoat. Bristol: Arrowsmith.
- ——; —— (1922). The Mercy of Allah. London: Chatto & Windus.
- ——; —— (1925). Mr. Petre: A Novel. London: Arrowsmith.
- ——; —— (1926). The Emerald of Catherine the Great. New York: Harper & Brothers.
- ——; —— (1927). The Haunted House. London: The Queensway Press.
- ——; —— (1928). But Soft—We Are Observed!. London: Arrowsmith. (Note: Marketed in the United States as Shadowed!)
- ——; —— (1929). The Missing Masterpiece. London: Harper & Brothers.
- ——; —— (1932). The Postmaster-General. Philadelphia: J. B. Lippincott Company.
- ——; —— (1936). The Hedge and The Horse. London: Cassel and Company.

== See also ==
- Catholic literary revival
- Dorothy Day
- Evelyn Waugh
- Jacques Maritain
