= The Path to Rome =

1902 travelogue by Hilaire Belloc

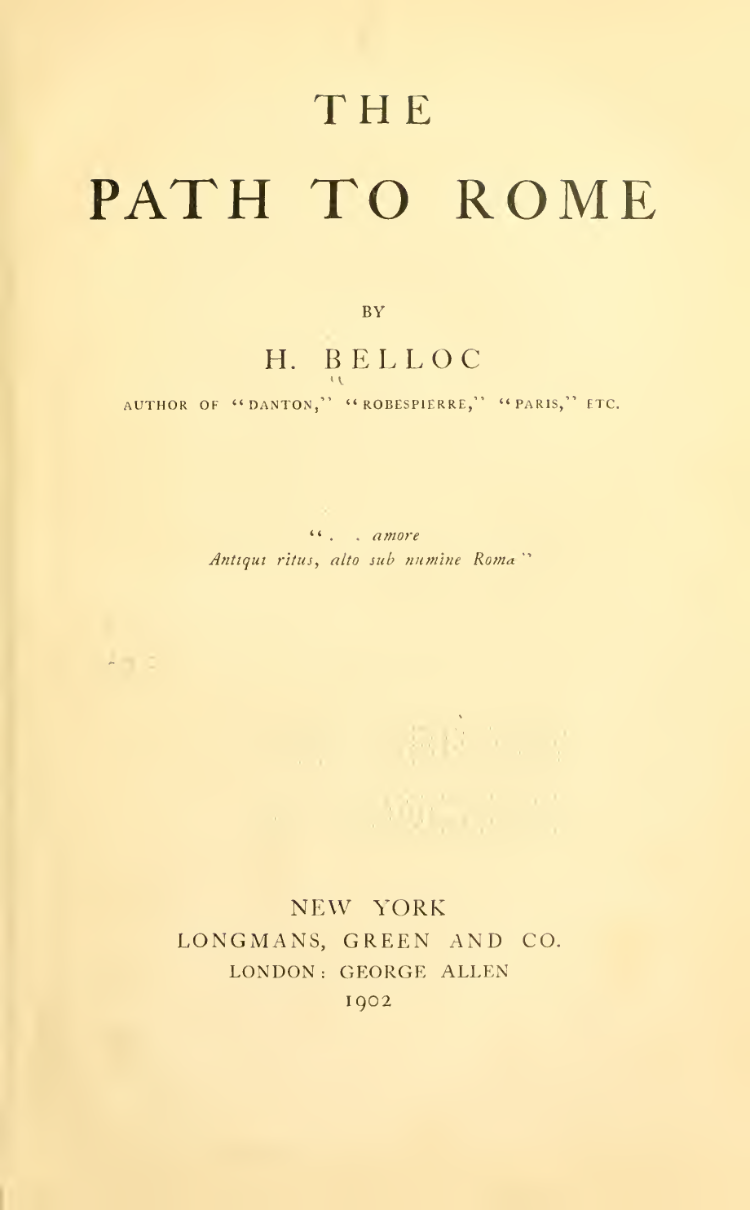
- Author: Hilaire Belloc
- Language: English
- Genre: Travelogue; carnivalesque
- Publisher: George Allen
- Publication date: 1902
- Publication place: United Kingdom
- Pages: 448
- OCLC: 2023180
- LC Class: 02015369
- Text: The Path to Rome at Wikisource

The Path to Rome is a 1902 travelogue by the French-English author and historian Hilaire Belloc. Belloc recounts his pilgrimage from Toul in northeastern France to Rome after encountering an extraordinary statue of Saint Mary in La Celle-Saint-Cloud, France, where he was born. The work contains his account of events in short vignettes, his thoughts on his travels, and asides about the history and geography of places he visits. Belloc also illustrates landmarks, noteworthy geographical features, and explanatory maps to frame his journey and explain his decisions to the audience. It also contains songs for which Belloc provides sheet music and lyrics.

The book is mostly written in a stream-of-consciousness style, containing several conversations between Belloc and an imagined reader (who is invariably combative and confused). The genre has been described as a carnivalesque within the tradition of literary modernism, though it foreshadows the later postmodernist style with its employment of complex literary structures, such as metalepsis, embedded narratives, and defamiliarisation. Although the book is written primarily in English, several passages and pieces of dialogue are in other languages, and language mix-ups and comments about the contemporary linguistic landscape figure prominently.

The Path to Rome was Belloc's most financially successful work and established him as a serious author. It is considered among the best in his literary canon and the quintessential example of his travel literature. Contemporary reviews were positive, focusing on Belloc's authenticity, shrewd observations, and sense of humour. Retrospectives have similarly praised the book, with much of the acclaim centering on Belloc's complex narrative structure and the focus on the minutiae of everyday life in the towns he visited. Critics have often compared it positively with the works of François Rabelais and Laurence Sterne. Belloc himself had a warm affection for the work; he later recounted that it was "the only book I ever wrote for love".

== Background ==
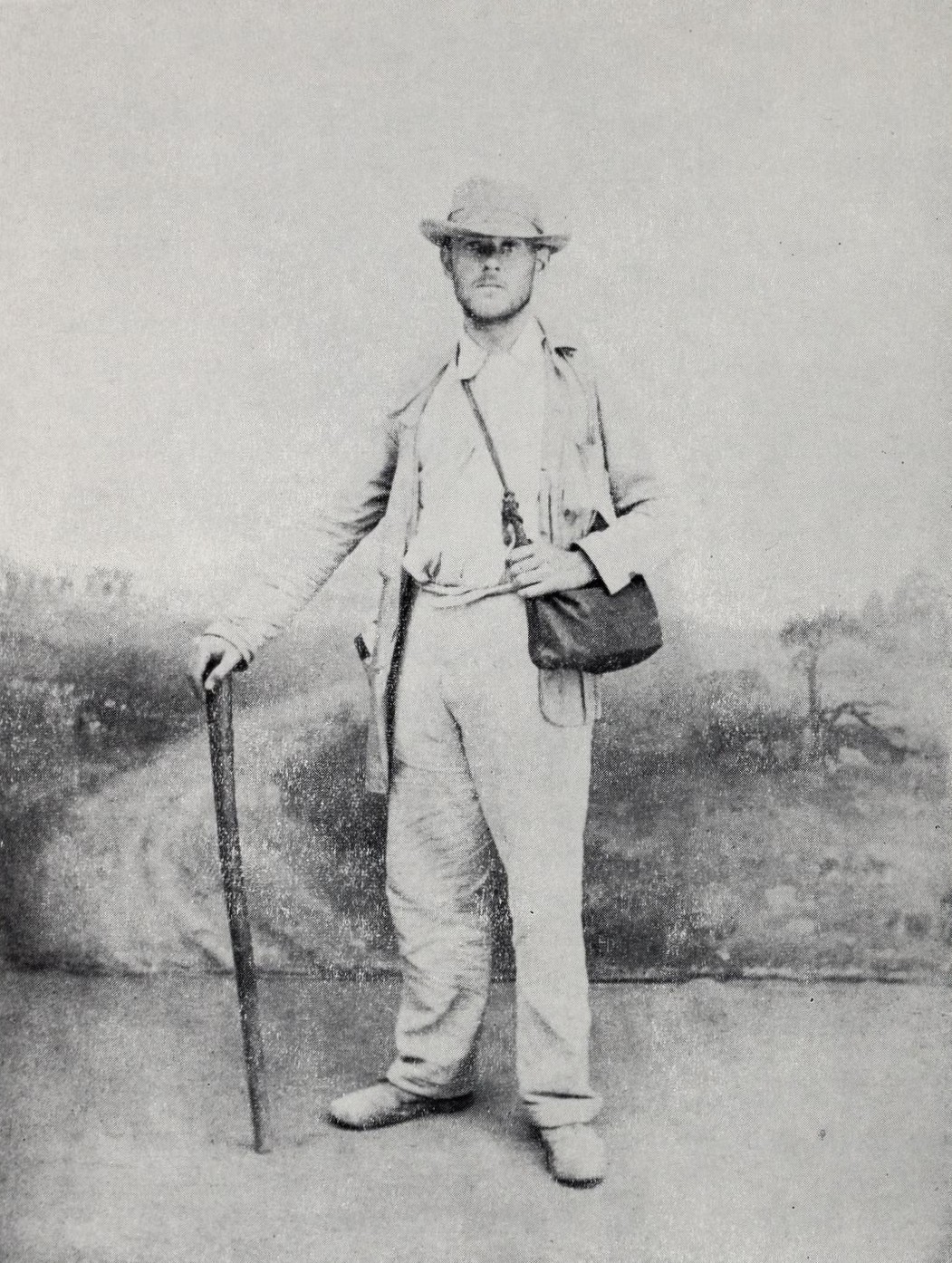
Belloc upon his arrival in Rome on 29 June 1901

Hilaire Belloc was a French-English author and historian later remembered in part for his ardent defences of the Catholic faith. Born in La Celle-Saint-Cloud, France, in 1870 to a French father and an English mother, Belloc moved with his family to England shortly after his birth, eventually settling in Sussex. As a young man, he served in the French Army and then attended Balliol College of the University of Oxford, attaining British citizenship in 1902. He was an accomplished foot-traveller, once marching from Philadelphia to California – some 2,800 miles (4,500 km) – to court Elodie Hogan, whom he later married.

After a trip to La Celle-Saint-Cloud he later outlined in the book, Belloc wrote a letter to the American journalist Maria Lansdale on New Year's Eve 1900 that he was planning a pilgrimage from his old garrison at Toul to Rome the following Easter. He told her he planned to write "whatever occurs to me to write [...] décousu (Note: Literally 'unstitched' or 'incoherent'.) and written anyhow of its essence". Shortly before the book was written, Belloc was working to complete his biography of Maximilien Robespierre and expressed that he was anxious to finish it to begin working on The Path to Rome.

Belloc's mother – the poet and feminist campaigner Bessie Rayner Parkes – tried desperately to convince him against going. At the time, Belloc and his wife had three young children and were struggling financially, but his journalistic work at The Daily News had earned him as much as £14 (equivalent to £1,490 in 2025) a week. His mother felt that an extended absence from his job as a journalist would hurt him professionally. Belloc rejoined that the work was impermanent and a strong publishing record outside journalism would be more lucrative in the long run, as a successful book would increase the value of his journalistic work. Still, Belloc did not have the money to complete the pilgrimage on his own and he reportedly had to beg his sister Marie for some of the funds. Finances became a regular worry for Belloc during his travels, as evidenced by letters home to his wife, though he was able to calm her worry by reminding her that he was owed £65 (equivalent to £6,910 in 2025) for his Robespierre manuscript, seven guineas (equivalent to £800 in 2025) by The Daily News, and another £12 10s (equivalent to £1,330 in 2025) for his lectures at the University of London.

At the beginning of June 1901, Belloc departed for Paris and bought clothes for his journey; he finished all but six pages of his biography of Robespierre on the evening of 5 June. The following day, he departed for Toul and sent his wife a postcard.

== Summary ==
I found myself entering that pleasant mood in which all books are conceived (but none written); I was "smoking the enchanted cigarettes" of Balzac, and if this kind of reverie is fatal to action, yet it is so much a factor of happiness that I wasted in the contemplation of that lovely and silent hollow many miles of marching. I suppose if a man were altogether his own master and controlled by no necessity, not even the necessity of expression, all his life would pass away in these sublime imaginings.

— The Path to Rome, p. 23

At the beginning of the book, Belloc recounts a trip he took some months before his pilgrimage to the Paris suburb of La Celle-Saint-Cloud, where he was born. While there, he went to the local Catholic church to say his prayers and noticed a statue of Saint Mary behind the altar. The statue was "so extraordinary and so different from all I had seen before, so much the spirit of my valley" that he vowed to take a pilgrimage to Rome. He made five vows to sanctify his journey: to travel entirely on foot, to sleep in the wild ("sleep rough"), to cover thirty miles (48 km) per day, to attend a Mass every morning, and to reach Rome in time for the High Mass at Saint Peter's Basilica for the Feast of Saints Peter and Paul on 29 June. Belloc recounts that he broke each of his vows one by one except for the last.

A few months later, Belloc begins his pilgrimage in Toul, which he chose as the starting point because he had served in the French Army there as an artilleryman. Upon reaching the first town after Toul, Flavigny, he realises he has broken his first vow by missing Mass. During his time in France, Belloc expresses profound admiration for the locals and is overconfident in his own ability to cross a great distance. Between Thayon and Épinal, he overexerts himself, injuring his foot and both knees, and realises he will not be able to maintain his vow of thirty miles a day. When he arrives in Épinal, he is given a balm by the local apothecary which makes the pain almost instantly disappear, though it becomes less effective throughout the journey. Belloc arrives in Belfort and discovers open-fermented wine, which he lauds. After buying some for the road, he travels some distance only to have his bottle come loose from his sack and shatter on the ground. Shortly thereafter, Belloc enters Switzerland.

Belloc does not realise he has entered Switzerland until he asks a group of travelling merchants. After passing through mountainous terrain, Belloc is fatigued, but a waggoner passing by asks if he needs a ride. Belloc is tempted to get into the cart, but he holds to his vow and clings onto the wagon and walks alongside it to Undervelier. As Belloc pushes deeper into Switzerland, the linguistic landscape begins shifting and he finds it increasingly difficult to communicate with the locals, all the while the pains in his foot and knees remain bothersome. He recruits a guide to help him over the Nufenen Pass, a dangerous part of the Swiss Alps, but a midsummer blizzard makes it impossible. After finding another way around, he eventually arrives at the border town of Chiasso, is questioned by border guards, and marches into Italy.

In Como, Belloc estimates he is about twenty-five miles (40 km) from Milan with only one franc and eighty centimes (equivalent to £17.65 in 2021) left. Belloc sees a sign of divine mercy and resolves to take a train to Milan. At the station, the ticket costs him exactly one franc and eighty centimes. In Calestano, Belloc is harassed by law enforcement and detained, but is able to convince the mayor to release him. He is greeted by a celebrating crowd and soon races through Tuscany.

As he passes through the Gate of the Poplar of the Old Wall of the Vatican in Rome, he realises Mass is ending. He asks a priest when the following Mass will be held; the priest tells him that he has but twenty minutes to wait, which pleases Belloc. Belloc tells the audience that he will not tell them anything further about Rome itself, but ends with a poem about his journey.

== Structure and style ==
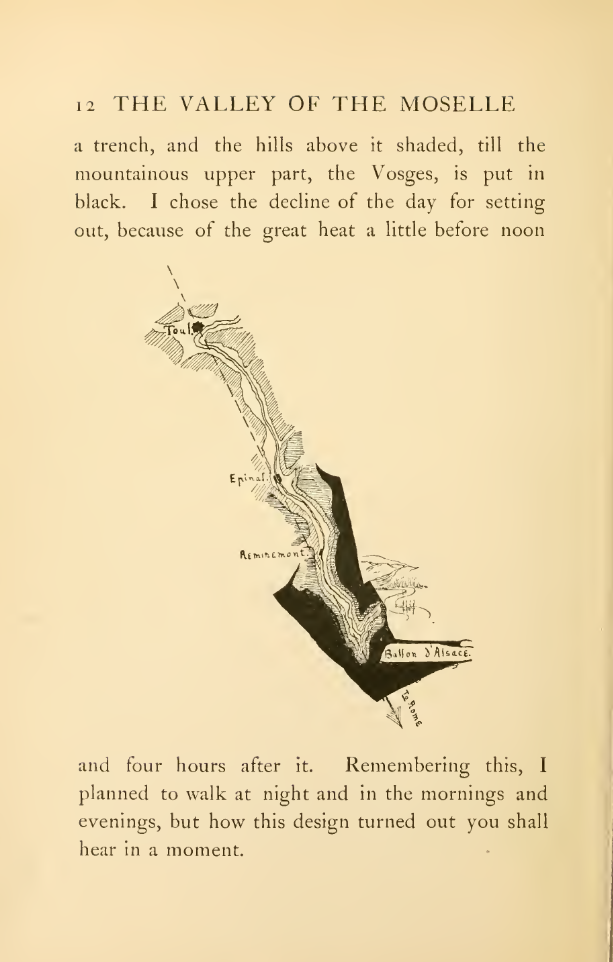
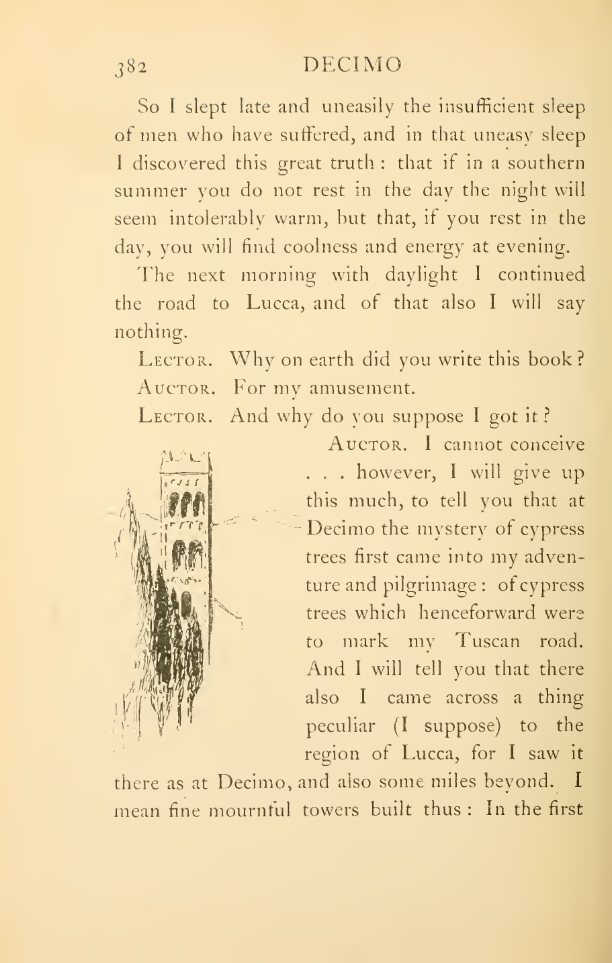
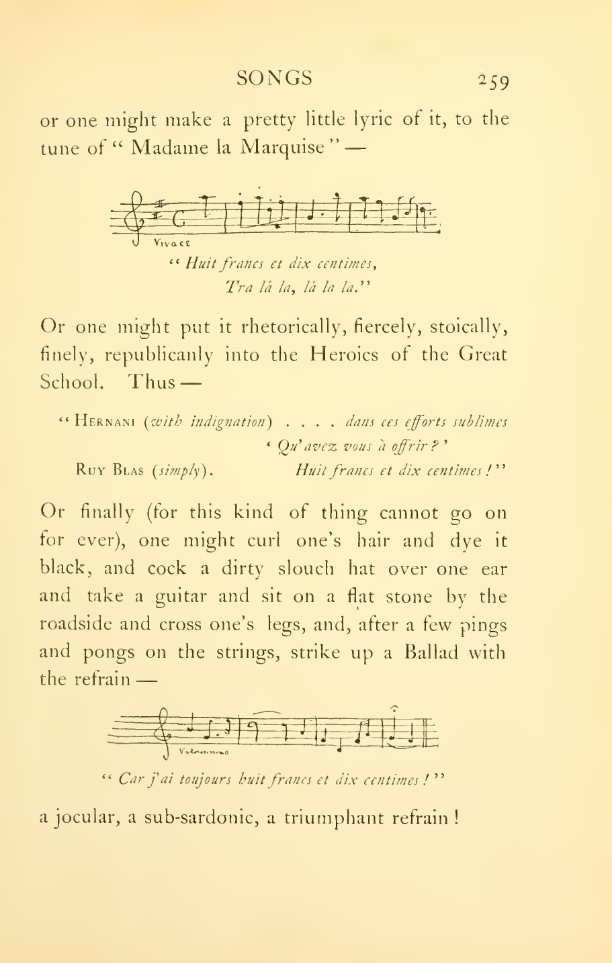
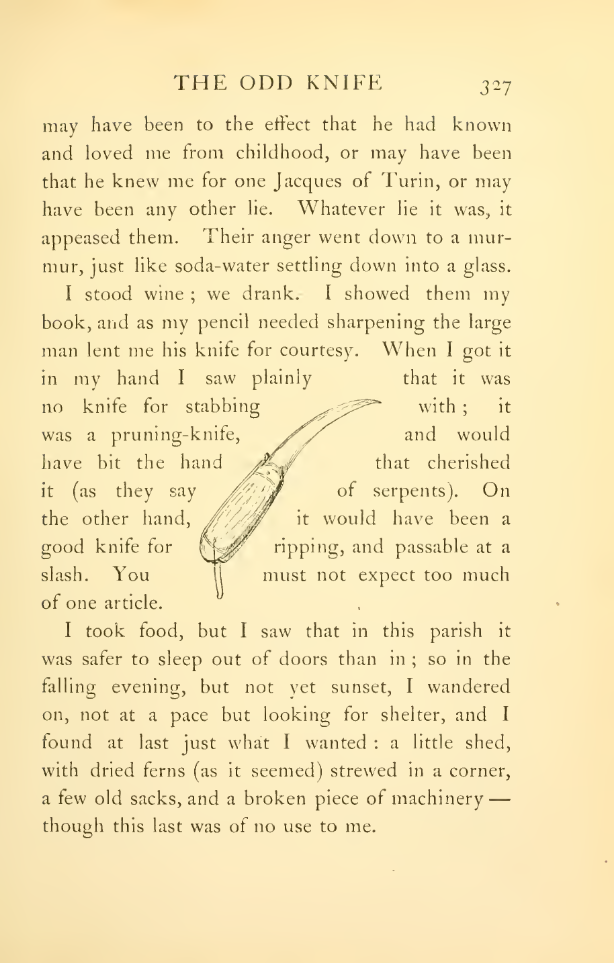
The Path to Rome is replete with hand-drawn maps (top left), imagined discussions between the author and the reader (top right), musical notation (bottom left), and drawings of pertinent objects or scenes Belloc came across during his travels.

The Path to Rome is written in a stream-of-consciousness style; it has no chapters or dates to orient its audience. It contains dozens of illustrations, musical notation for songs, and verse poetry interspersed throughout. Throughout the book, Belloc interacts with an imagined reader, Lector, (Note: Latin for 'reader'.) who is often combative, bored, and confused. The American literary critic and Catholic nun Maria Frassati Jakupcak has described it as having "the narrative pace [of] Belloc's wandering feet". Belloc himself remarked of its style in a letter to E. S. P. Haynes: "This Path to Rome is a jolly book to write. No research, no bother, no style, no anything. I just write straight ahead as fast as I can and stick in all that comes into my head."

The Path to Rome is typically described as a travelogue, though others reject this appellation and prefer to describe its narrative style and focal tendencies as something of a "self-portrait"; that is, what Belloc chooses to discuss tells the audience more about himself than what he is describing. The British journalist and historian A. N. Wilson, for example, writes that Belloc's ten-page description of Flavigny, a "comparatively obscure town", being longer than his description of the entirety of Tuscany typifies this self-portrait appraisal of the work. The British-American Catholic biographer Joseph Pearce has described the book thus:

The Path to Rome is both a travelogue and a farrago, which is to say that it is, at one and the same time, a linear narrative connected to a journey and a seemingly random dispersal of anecdotal thoughts and musings. It is animated, therefore, by the tension between the forward momentum maintained by the author's account of his pilgrimage and the inertial force of the tangential interruptions and digressions.

Frassati Jakupcak describes the literary genre and style as a carnivalesque containing avant-garde and modernist narratives. Elements of the later postmodern movement are also present, particularly the use of travel narratives to express more complex emotions like solitude and turmoil in familiar circumstances. Describing the book as "self-consciously Rabelaisian", she relates Belloc's role as the narrator to "the quintessential carnival fool". According to Mikhail Bakhtin's analysis of carnivalesque literature, The Path to Rome matches all of the genre-defining elements: verbal abuse, "comic verbal compositions", and the inversion of the traditional separation between the audience and the author.

The embedded narrative between Belloc and the Lector character forms a complex literary technique called metalepsis; in other words, Belloc places himself in a disruptive position between the reader and the work itself by centring the artificiality of the book's narrative. Frassati Jakupcak has described Belloc's use of the Lector narrative as a form of defamiliarisation. She relates the character to the English yachtsman at the beginning of G. K. Chesterton's spiritual autobiography Orthodoxy, who accidentally lands back in England believing he has discovered a whole new world both identical to his homeland and yet totally alien from it. In making the reading itself somewhat strange, Frassati Jakupcak argues the enjoyment of reading is renewed.

== Reception and influence ==
The Path to Rome was by far Belloc's most financially successful publication during his lifetime and helped to establish him as a serious writer. Published by George Allen in April 1902, the book sold 112,000 copies and met with extremely positive critical reception. William Le Queux gave the book resounding praise in his review for The Literary World. Chesterton, a new acquaintance of Belloc's, (Note: Although Chesterton and Belloc were later close friends and frequent collaborators, they had only recently met when Chesterton's review was published.) also approved of the book. His review in The World lauded the book's authenticity and joyfulness, writing:

The Path to Rome is written recklessly. The typical modern book of nonsense is written so as to appear reckless. The Path to Rome is the product of the actual and genuine buoyancy and thoughtlessness of a rich intellect; whereas the young decadent takes more trouble over his nursery rhymes than even over his sonnets. [...] He will be a lucky man who can escape out of that world of freezing folly into the flaming and reverberating folly of The Path to Rome.

The Athenaeum gave a positive review, calling Belloc "of the school to which Sterne, Heine, [and] Cobbett, each in his different fashion, belong" and complimenting his ability "to see with the eyes of two races". The review is favourable to Belloc's sense of humour and witty anticipation of criticism, though it comments that the book exposes him as an inexperienced – albeit sympathetic – traveller. Although the book is considered rather digressive by the reviewer, the piece compliments Belloc's strong writing, shrewd observational skills, and originality.

A 1922 review in The American Catholic Quarterly Review praised both Belloc's The Path to Rome and Europe and the Faith as noticing "not only our [Catholic] spiritual kinship with the Roman Empire, but our material heritage as well". It singles out The Path to Rome for its focus on the minutiae of contemporary life such as in its descriptions of local cuisine, architecture, and civil engineering, calling the book "the testament of a citizen of the world who finds himself at home in any place from Algeria to California".

The British journalist and travel writer Stephen Graham began walking and writing in 1910 after being recommended The Path to Rome by a fellow journalist. Around two years later, he made a pilgrimage to Jerusalem with hundreds of Russians for Easter and wrote an account of it called With Russian Pilgrims to Jerusalem. The Path to Rome also influenced the British mountaineer and writer Arnold Lunn tremendously, who was ultimately knighted for improving British relations with Switzerland and converted to Catholicism partially under influence from Belloc. Fifty years after reading it, Lunn described it as his favourite book and said he made a point of re-reading it at least once a year. When Lunn gushed about his love of the book to Belloc, Belloc revealed that he had made an unfortunate mistake by selling the copyright "for a ridiculously small sum". Belloc was also a major influence on the English poet Ivor Gurney. In the dedication of his first book of poetry Severn and Somme, Gurney named Belloc as one of its dedicatees and described The Path to Rome as his "trench companion" while serving on the front line in World War I.

In one of his memoirs, Gerald Cumberland recounts that The Path to Rome had a particularly strong influence on him, causing him to spend a significant time imitating Belloc including walking from Ilfracombe to Exeter to Land's End. Cumberland carried a first-edition copy of the book with him regularly and was so taken with it that he wrote to Belloc to express his admiration. Belloc responded a few days later that the letter "had given him more pleasure than any of the enthusiastic reviews in the papers". Cumberland glued the letter into the book, though he lost it after a friend who had borrowed it died with it still in his possession.

=== Within Belloc's oeuvre ===
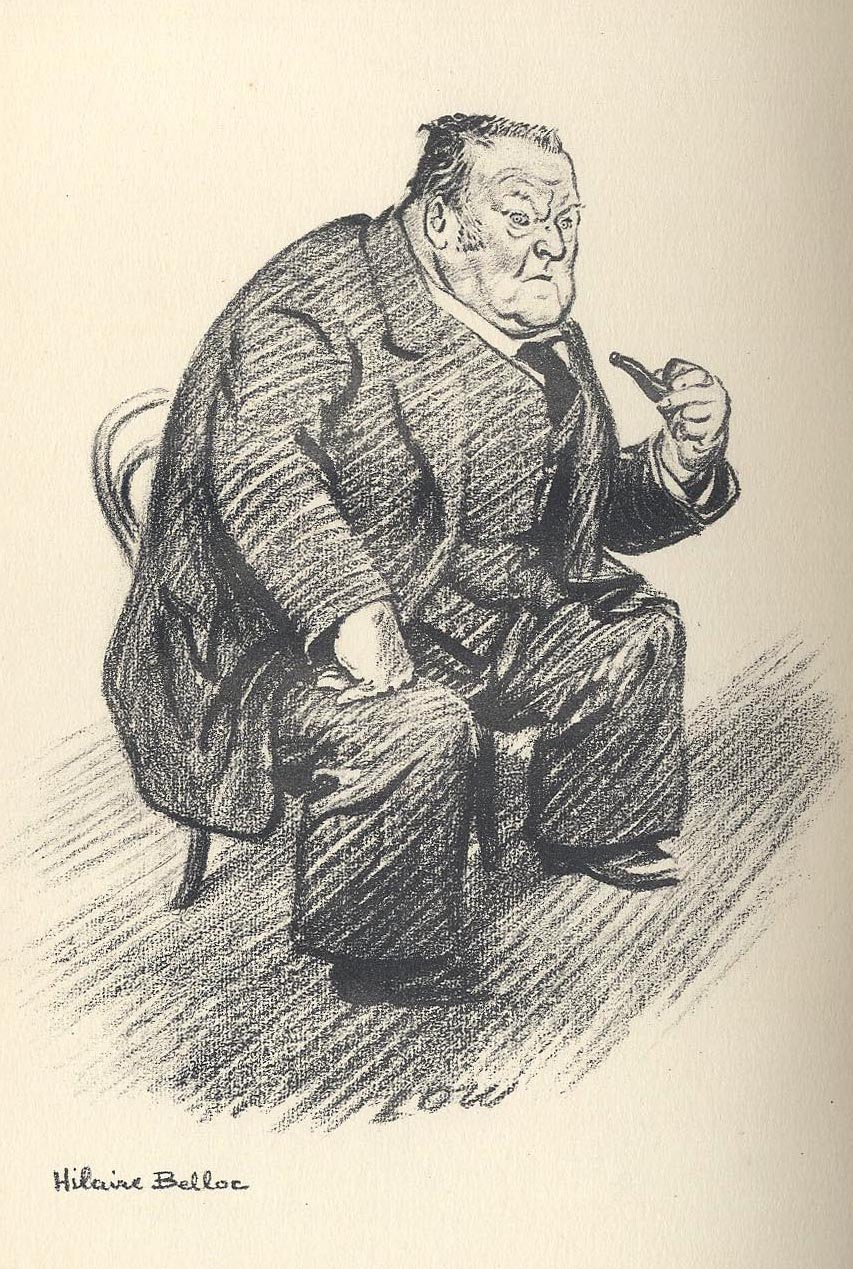
A caricature of Belloc by David Low (1928)

The Path to Rome remains one of Belloc's most highly regarded works and his most popular work of prose. It has been viewed as a quintessential example of the Bellocian travelogue: coarsely humorous, enamoured with the beauty of the physical world, and spiritually informed. Patrick Braybrooke describes it as one example which reflects Belloc's versatility in writing. He argues that "it might easily [have been] but a notebook of thoughts", but Belloc transforms it into a sober reflection on the struggle of pilgrimage and brings the reader into the joy and terror that he experienced during his journey, making it "undoubtedly one of Belloc's most popular and fascinating books". Retrospectives of the work have compared it favourably to the work of Laurence Sterne, particularly his The Life and Opinions of Tristram Shandy, and those of François Rabelais. A review in The New York Times compared it to the works of Robert Burton, Samuel Butler, Robert Louis Stevenson, and Izaak Walton.

Shortly after Belloc's death, the American philosopher Frederick Wilhelmsen wrote Hilaire Belloc: No Alienated Man, an analysis of Belloc's works and philosophy. In it, Wilhelmsen compares The Path to Rome with two of Belloc's other travelogues, The Cruise of the Nona and Hills and the Sea, as acknowledging the physical beauty of nature as both a blessing of God and as a testament to divine power. Wilhelmsen further compares The Path to Rome with Belloc's later travelogue-like novel The Four Men: A Farrago, published almost a decade later. He argues that in The Four Men, Myself – a characterisation of part of Belloc's personality – feels at home in the company of the other three; all four are tepid Catholics who view immortality as a hope rather than as a promise, but Myself is surrounded by reminders that he will be alienated from his mortal friends in death, accentuated by the autumnal setting. In contrast, though published earlier, The Path to Rome's Belloc is a "Catholic at home in Christendom" who can no longer be alienated from his surroundings. He is able to travel with gratitude and a sense of humour; Wilhelmsen characterises him as Myself transformed: "a member of the Church Militant destined to be a member of the Church Triumphant", who has conquered doubt after a fierce struggle and is granted some peace for having done so.

The Irish historian John P. McCarthy argues that The Path to Rome demonstrates an important element of Belloc's Weltanschauung, a "romantic neomedievalism which idealized a precapitalist, prenationalist Christian Europe where the social Darwinist concepts of racial politics were nonexistent". Belloc's thoughts express a sentiment which contrasted what he viewed as a unified Catholic Europe against a rising trend toward nationalism which was tearing the continent apart. He presents several defences for later themes in his work, which contrast his anti-capitalist feeling from his contemporaries'. For example, his positive views of smallholdings, private property, and manual labour differed with those of the Fabian Society at the time, who saw technological advancement as a part of the socialist project. According to McCarthy, though his contemporaries viewed human instinct as a tool to be bent towards rationalism, Belloc's sentiments in The Path to Rome show that he believed man could reach happiness and spiritual security by embracing "what the human race has done for thousands of years", "buried right into our blood from immemorial habit": (Note: McCarthy takes the quoted passages from The Path to Rome.) drinking, hunting, dancing, and working with one's hands, among others.

Belloc viewed the book as his best work. Although he was a prolific writer, he later recounted: "I hate writing. I wouldn't have written a word if I could have helped it. I only wrote for money. The Path to Rome is the only book I ever wrote for love." Both Wilson and Pearce believe Belloc was toying with his interviewers about his hatred for writing. Writing to the American artist Carl Schmitt in 1930, Belloc described his novel Belinda as "certainly the book of mine which I like best since I wrote The Path to Rome". Two years after publication, Belloc wrote in his own copy of the book: "I wrote this book for the glory of God". Belloc wrote a short poem in the same copy four years later on 6 January, the Feast of the Epiphany:

Alas! I never shall so write again!
Envoi
Prince, bow yourself to God and bow to Time,
Which is God's servant for the use of men,
To bend them to his purpose sublime,
Alas! I never shall so write again.

== See also ==
- The New Jerusalem (Chesterton book) – A 1920 pilgrimage travelogue by G. K. Chesterton, Belloc's longtime friend and collaborator
