= Mont Blanc Restaurant =

Coordinates: 51°30′42″N 0°7′53″W

- Interactive map of Mont Blanc Restaurant

Restaurant information
- Closed: 1928
- Location: London, United Kingdom

Mont Blanc Restaurant is a former restaurant in London where leading writers including Hilaire Belloc, G. K. Chesterton, Joseph Conrad and John Galsworthy met regularly in the early years of the 20th century.

== History ==
The restaurant was located at 16 Gerrard Street in the Soho district of central London. It was closed in 1928.

== Mont Blanc circle ==
Writer, critic and publisher Edward Garnett held regular Tuesday lunches at the restaurant where he nurtured the talent of many literary figures such as D. H. Lawrence, John Galsworthy and Liam O'Flaherty. Chesterton and Belloc met at the restaurant in 1900 and subsequently developed a close friendship, apparently sealed over a bottle of Moulin-à-Vent. In 1912, through Garnett's circle of friends, Richard Curle was first introduced to Conrad and became his protégé, literary assistant and close friend.

== Commemorative Plaque ==
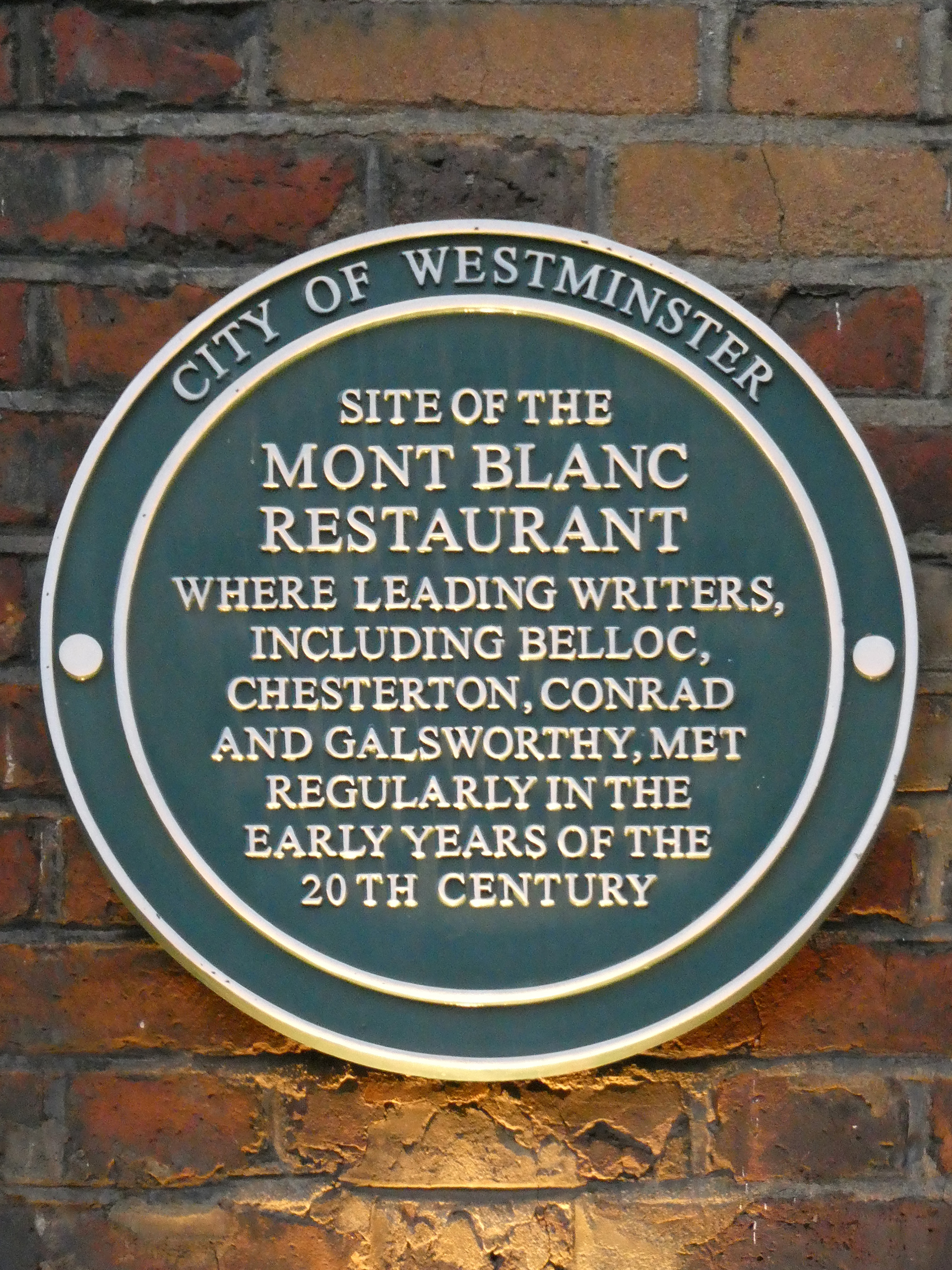
Plaque commemorating the former restaurant

In July 2010 the City of Westminster commemorated the restaurant with one of its Commemorative Green Plaques.
