= Patrick Braybrooke =

British literary critic (1894–1956)

Patrick Braybrooke FRSL
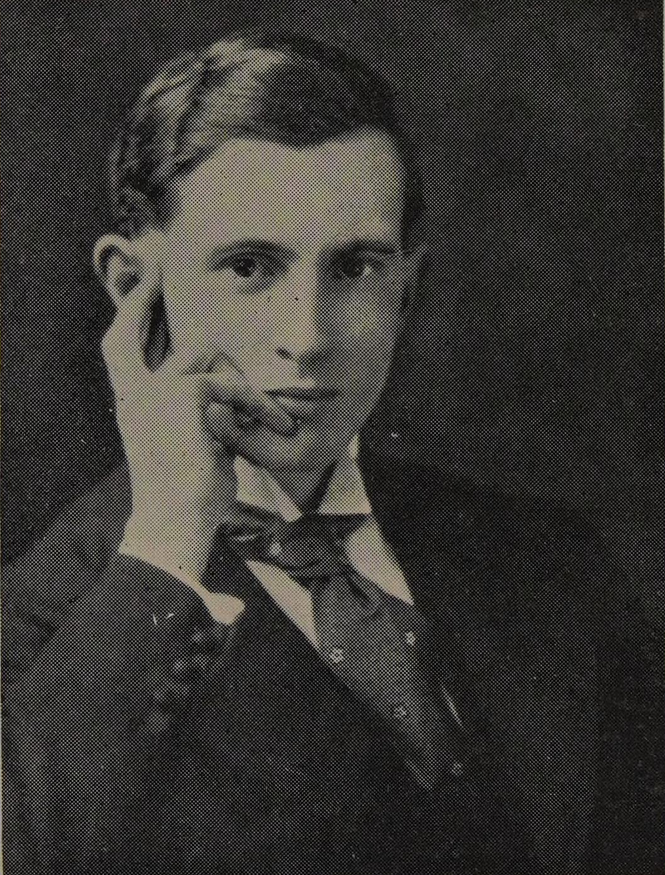
- Born: Patrick Philip William Braybrooke; 1894; Reading, Berkshire, United Kingdom
- Died: 1956 (aged 61–62)
- Education: King's College London
- Occupation: Literary critic
- Spouses: Lettice Marjorie Bellairs (m. 1921) Ida Cooper (m. 1929) Rita Ellen Constance Rivers Cripps (m. 1937)
- Writing career
- Notable work: Gilbert Keith Chesterton
- Military career
- Allegiance: United Kingdom
- Branch: British Army
- Service years: ?–1915
- Rank: Second lieutenant
- Unit: Royal Fusiliers
- Wars: World War I

Patrick Philip William Braybrooke FRSL (1894–1956) was an English literary critic who largely concentrated his attention on English writers of the nineteenth and early twentieth century.

He is best remembered for his biographical study, Gilbert Keith Chesterton, which assesses the writing of Chesterton and describes his literary relationship to such writers as Dickens, Thackeray and Browning. It also offers a view of Chesterton the man. Braybrooke, who was a second cousin of Chesterton's wife Frances, met the older writer many times from his teens onwards. It is possible that Chesterton's move towards Catholicism culminating in his conversion in 1922, was influential in Braybrooke's shift in interest away from his Anglican roots. Catholic writers were a frequent subject of his writing.

Two of his biographies – The Life and Work of Lord Alfred Douglas (1931) and The Amazing Mr Noel Coward (1933) – were the first to tackle their subjects.

He was a student at King's College, London. During the First World War, he served as a second lieutenant in the Royal Fusiliers. He was wounded and gassed, and invalided out of the army in April 1915.

== Early life and family ==
Braybrooke was born in 1894 in Reading, Berkshire to William Alfred Rossi Braybrooke and Alice Charlotte Chase. He was the eldest of three brothers, with Micheal Knollys (1899–1991) the middle and Arthur Rossi (1902–1989) the youngest. Both his father, William, and his brother, Arthur, were priests in the Church of England. Braybrooke was also a great-great-grandson of the Honourable and Reverend Francis Knollys, Vicar of Burford from 1771 to 1826. Rev. Francis Knollys was the son of Charles Knollys, 5th Earl of Banbury. Braybrooke was also a great-great-grandson of the prominent sculptor John Charles Felix Rossi RA (1762–1839), whose work can be found in St Paul's Cathedral, Buckingham Palace and The Royal Opera House Covent Garden.

Braybrooke was married three times, firstly to Lettice Marjorie Bellairs in 1921, secondly to Ida Cooper in 1929, and thirdly to Rita Ellen Constance Rivers Cripps (née Hatherell) in 1937. His son by his first marriage, Neville Braybrooke, also a writer, edited The Letters of J. R. Ackerley (1975) and wrote, with his wife June, Olivia Manning: A Life (2004).

== Works ==
- Oddments (1921)
- Suggestive Fragments (1922)
- Gilbert Keith Chesterton (1922)
- Some Thoughts on Hilaire Belloc: Ten Studies (1923)
- John Morley (1924)
- J M Barrie: a Study in Fairies and Mortals (1924)
- Considerations on Edmund Gosse (1925)
- The Genius of Bernard Shaw (1925)
- Kipling and His Soldiers (1926)
- Novelists: We Are Seven (1926)
- Cruelty: Being the Story of a Peculiar Young Man (1926)
- The Short Story: How to Write It (1927)
- Peeps at the Mighty (1927)
- Some Goddesses of the Pen: Studies of Eight Women Authors (1927)
- The Man Who Arrived (1927)
- Thomas Hardy and His Philosophy (1928)
- Some Aspects of H G Wells (1928)
- A Chesterton Catholic Anthology (1929)
- A Child's R L Stevenson (1929)
- The Wisdom of G K Chesterton (1929)
- Great Children in Literature (1929)
- The Subtlety of George Bernard Shaw (1930)
- A Child's Charles Dickens (1930)
- Celebrities in Verse (1930)
- Oscar Wilde: A Study (1930)
- Some Catholic Novelists (1931)
- Philosophies in Modern Fiction (1931)
- The Life and Work of Lord Alfred Douglas (1931)
- The Young Folk's Sir Walter Scott (1931)
- The Robert Louis Stevenson Book (1932)
- Some Victorian and Georgian Catholics: Their Art and Outlook (1932)
- The Amazing Mr Noel Coward (1933)
- Moments With Burns, Scott and Stevenson: Selected Quotations (1933)
- I Remember G K Chesterton (1938)
