= Ian Ker =

English Catholic priest (1942–2022)

The Reverend Ian Ker

Personal life
- Born: Ian Turnbull Ker; 30 August 1942 Uttarakhand, British Raj
- Died: 5 November 2022 (aged 80) Gloucester, United Kingdom

Religious life
- Religion: Catholic

Ian Turnbull Ker (30 August 1942 – 5 November 2022) was an English Catholic priest, a former Anglican and a scholar and author. He was generally regarded as the world's authority on John Henry Newman, on whom he published more than 20 books.

== Biography ==
Ker was a student at Shrewsbury School and read for his undergraduate degree at Balliol College, Oxford. He worked as an academic briefly at the University of York, teaching English Literature there. He then began training for the Catholic priesthood. In the 1980s, Ker worked as a Catholic chaplain at the University of Southampton. Later in life, he moved to Burford, Oxfordshire and taught theology at the University of Oxford, where he was a senior research fellow at Blackfriars, Oxford, and a member of the Faculty of Theology. He taught both English literature and theology at universities in the UK and the USA. Ker was regarded as the leading authority on John Henry Newman, on whom he published the universally acknowledged definitive biography. He was the author of The Catholic Revival in English Literature 1845–1961, Mere Catholicism, and G.K. Chesterton: A Biography. On this last book, the late Christopher Hitchens reviewed that "Professor Ker's spirited and double-barreled attempt at a rehabilitation" of Chesterton "is enjoyable in its own right."

Ker died on 5 November 2022, in Gloucester, at the age of 80.

== Selected bibliography ==
A selected bibliography of Ker's books sorted by year of first publication:

- 1990. "John Henry Newman: A biography". Oxford University Press ISBN 9780192827050.
- 2003. "The Catholic Revival in English Literature 1845-1961". Notre Dame Press USA. ISBN 085244625X.
- 2007. "Mere Catholicism". Emmaus Road Publishing. ISBN 9781931018395.
- 2012. "GK Chesterton: A biography". Oxford University Press. ISBN 9780199655762.
- 2010. John Henry Newman. Una biografía. (Spanish edition) Ediciones Palabra. ISBN 9788498402827
