= G. K. Chesterton bibliography =

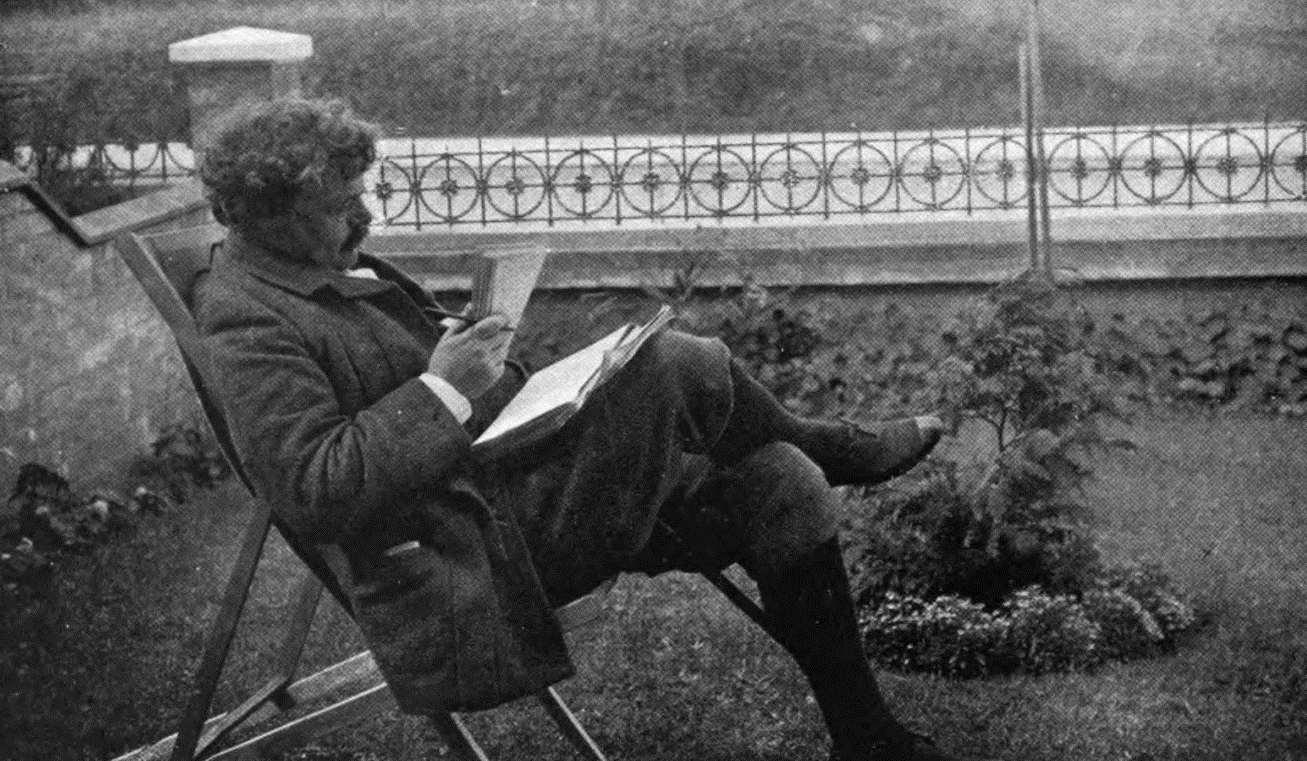
Chesterton, c. 1908

This is a list of the books written by G. K. Chesterton.

== 1900–1909 ==
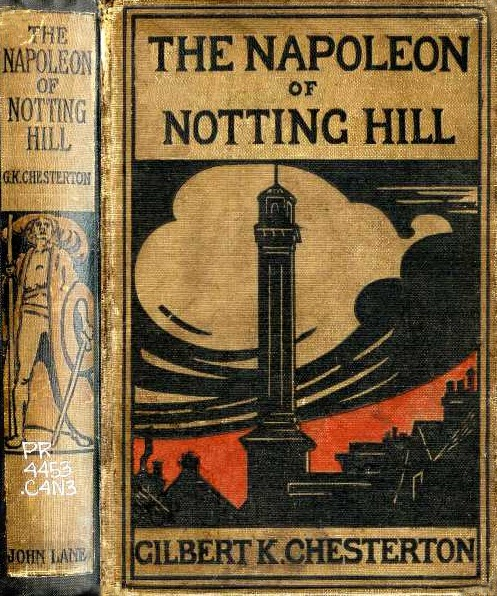
Cover of The Napoleon of Notting Hill

- Chesterton, Gilbert Keith (1900), Greybeards at Play (poetry), London: R. Brimley Johnson.
- ——— (1900), The Wild Knight and Other Poems (poetry).
- ——— (1901), The Defendant , London: R. Brimley Johnson – via Wikisource.
- ———; Williams, J.E. Hodder (1902), Thomas Carlyle, London: Hodder and Stoughton.
- ———; Nicoll, W. Robertson (1902), Robert Louis Stevenson, London: Hodder and Stoughton.
- ——— (1902), Twelve Types, London: Arthur L. Humphreys.
- ——— (1903), Robert Browning, London: Macmillan & Co., Ltd..
- ———; Kitton, F.G. (1903), Charles Dickens: with Numerous Illustrations, London: Hodder and Stoughton.
- ———; Garnett, Richard (1903), Tennyson, London: Hodder and Stoughton.
- ———; Melville, Lewis (1903), Thackeray, London: Hodder and Stoughton.
- ———; Perris, G.H.; Garnett, Edward (1903), Leo Tolstoy, London: Hodder and Stoughton.
- ——— (1903), Varied Types, New York: Dodd, Mead, and Company.
- ——— (1904), The Napoleon of Notting Hill (novel), London & New York: John Lane: The Bodley Head.
- ——— (1904), G.F. Watts, London: Duckworth & Co.
- ——— (1905), The Club of Queer Trades (stories), New York & London: Harper & Brothers.
- ——— (1905), Heretics, London: John Lane: The Bodley Head.
- ——— (1906), Charles Dickens.
- ——— (1908), The Man Who Was Thursday: A Nightmare (novel), New York: Dodd, Mead and Company.
- ——— (1908), Orthodoxy, London: Bodley Head.
- ——— (1908), All Things Considered , London: Methuen & Co. – via Wikisource.
- ——— (1909), George Bernard Shaw, New York: John Lane Company.
- ——— (1909), Tremendous Trifles, London: Methuen & Co.
- ——— (1909), The Ball and the Cross (novel), London: Wells Gardner, Darton & Co., Ltd. – via Wikisource.

== 1910–1919 ==
- Chesterton, Gilbert Keith (1910), Five Types (essays), selected from Twelve Types.
- ——— (1910), William Blake.
- ——— (1910), Alarms and Discursions.
- ——— (1910), What's Wrong With the World.
- ——— (1911), Appreciations and Criticisms of the Works of Charles Dickens.
- ——— (1911), The Ballad of the White Horse (poetry).
- ——— (1911), The Wit and Wisdom of GK Chesterton.
- ——— (1911), The Innocence of Father Brown (stories).
- ——— (1911), A Chesterton Calendar. Compiled from the Writings of G.K.C. (Calendar).
- ——— (1912), Manalive (novel).
- ——— (1912), A Miscellany of Men.
- ——— (1912), Simplicity and Tolstoy.
- ——— (1913), Magic (play).
- ——— (1913), The Victorian Age in Literature.
- ——— (1914), The Flying Inn (novel).
- ——— (1914), The Wisdom of Father Brown (stories).
- ——— (1914), Trial of John Jasper, Lay Precentor of Cloisterham Cathedral in the County of Kent, for the Murder of Edwin Drood.
- ——— (1914), London.
- ——— (1914), The Barbarism of Berlin.
- ——— (1915), Poems.
- ——— (1915), Wine, Water and Song (poetry) – via Project Gutenberg.
- ——— (1915), The Appetite of Tyranny.
- ——— (1915), The Crimes of England.
- ——— (1916), Divorce vs. Democracy.
- ——— (1916), The Book of Job.
- ——— (1916), A Shilling for My Thoughts.
- ——— (1916), Temperance and The Great Alliance (pamphlet).
- ——— (1917), Utopia of Usurers.
- ——— (1917), Lord Kitchener.
- ——— (1917), A Short History of England.
- ——— (1918), How to Help Annexation.
- ——— (1919), Irish Impressions.

== 1920–1929 ==
- Chesterton, Gilbert Keith (1920), The Superstition of Divorce.
- ——— (1920), The Uses of Diversity.
- ——— (1920), The New Jerusalem.
- ——— (1922), The Ballad of St. Barbara and Other Poems (poetry).
- ——— (1922), The Man Who Knew Too Much (stories).
- ——— (1922), Eugenics and other Evils.
- ——— (1922), What I Saw in America .
- ——— (1923), St. Francis of Assisi.
- ——— (1923), Poems.
- ——— (1923), Fancies Versus Fads (essays).
- ——— (1924), The End of the Roman Road.
- ——— (1925), Tales of the Long Bow (stories).
- ——— (1925), The Superstitions of the Sceptic.
- ——— (1925), The Everlasting Man.
- ——— (1925), William Cobbett.
- ——— (1926), The Queen of Seven Swords (poetry).
- ——— (1926), The Outline of Sanity.
- ——— (1926), The Incredulity of Father Brown (stories).
- ——— (1926), The Catholic Church and Conversion.
- ——— (1926), Collected Works. Nine volumes.
- ——— (1926), Collected Poems.
- ——— (1927), Robert Louis Stevenson.
- ——— (1927), The Secret of Father Brown (stories).
- ——— (1927), The Return of Don Quixote (novel).
- ——— (1927), The Judgment of Dr. Johnson (play).
- ——— (1927), The Collected Poems of G.K. Chesterton.
- ——— (1927), Gloria in Profundis (poetry).
- ——— (1927), Culture and the Coming Peril.
- ——— (1927), Social Reform vs. Birth Control
- ——— (1928), Generally Speaking
- ——— with Shaw, George Bernard (1928), Do We Agree? (debate).
- ——— (1928), The Sword of Wood (stories).
- ——— (1929), The Thing: Why I am a Catholic.
- ——— (1929), de Fonseka, J.P. (ed.), G.K.C. as M.C (collected introductions).
- ——— (1929), Father Brown Omnibus (collected stories).
- ——— (1929), The Poet and the Lunatics (stories).
- ——— (1929), Ubi Ecclesia (poetry).
- ——— (1929), Christmas Poems.
- ——— (1929), New and Collected Poems.

== 1930–1936 ==
- Chesterton, Gilbert Keith (1930), Four Faultless Felons (stories), separately in US as The Ecstatic Thief; The Honest Quack; The Loyal Traitor; The Moderate Murderer.
- ——— (1930), The Turkey and the Turk (play for mummers).
- ——— (1930), The Grave of Arthur.
- ——— (1930), Come to Think of It.
- ——— (1930), The Resurrection of Rome.
- ——— (1931), All is Grist.
- ——— (1931), The Floating Admiral (collaborative detective story).
- ——— (1932), Chaucer.
- ——— (1932), New Poems.
- ——— (1932), Christendom in Dublin.
- ——— (1932), Sidelights of New London and Newer York.
- ——— (1933), All I Survey.
- ——— (1933), St. Thomas Aquinas: The Dumb Ox.
- ——— (1934), Avowals and Denials, Dodd, Mead & company – via Internet Archive.
- ——— (1934), GK's: A Miscellany of the First 500 Issues of G. K.'s Weekly.
- ——— (1935), The Well and the Shallows.
- ——— (1935), The Way of the Cross.
- ——— (1935), The Scandal of Father Brown (stories).
- ——— (1935), Stories, Essays And Poems.
- ——— (1936), Autobiography.
- ——— (1936), As I Was Saying.

== Posthumous ==
- Chesterton, Gilbert Keith (1937), The Paradoxes of Mr. Pond.
- ——— (1937), The Man Who Was Chesterton (anthology)
- ——— (1938), The Coloured Lands.
- ——— (1940), Sheed, Frank (ed.), The End of the Armistice.
- ——— (1943), The Pocket Book of Father Brown, and many other reprint collections, including:
  - ——— (1959), The Second Father Brown,
  - ——— (1961), Ten Adventures of Father Brown,
  - ——— (1981), The Penguin Complete Father Brown,
  - ——— (1983), The Father Brown Omnibus,
  - ——— (1987), The Best of Father Brown,
  - ——— (1989), The Annotated Innocence of Father Brown,
  - ——— (1990), Father Brown Crime Stories,
  - ——— (1996), Father Brown of the Church of Rome.
- ——— (1950), The Common Man.
- ——— (1952), The Surprise (play).
- ——— (1953), A Handful of Authors.
- ——— (1954), Collected Poems.
- ——— (1955), Collins, Dorothy (ed.), The Glass Walking-Stick.
- ——— (1958), Collins, Dorothy (ed.), Lunacy and Letters.
- ——— (1961), Where All Roads Lead.
- ——— (1965), Collins, Dorothy (ed.), The Spice of Life.
- ——— (1970), Auden, W.H. (ed.), G. K. Chesterton. A selection from his non-fictional prose, Faber & Faber.
- ——— (1972), Collins, Dorothy (ed.), Chesterton on Shakespeare.
- ——— (1975), Collins, Dorothy (ed.), The Apostle and the Wild Ducks.
- ——— (1978), The Hound of Heaven and Other Poems.
- ——— (1984), Smith, Marie (ed.), The Spirit of Christmas.
- ——— (1984), Basic Chesterton.
- ——— (1985), Kavanagh, P.J. (ed.), The Bodley Head G.K. Chesterton.
- ——— (1986), Smith, Marie (ed.), Daylight and Nightmare (uncollected short fiction).
- ——— (1986), GK's Weekly: A Sampler.
- ——— (1986), The Collected Works of G. K. Chesterton, Ignatius Press.
- ——— (1986), Illustrated London News, 1905–1907.
- ——— (1987), Illustrated London News, 1908–1910.
- ——— (1987), Smith, Marie (ed.), Collected Nonsense and Light Verse.
- ——— (1988), Illustrated London News, 1911–1913.
- ——— (1988), Illustrated London News, 1914–1916.
- ——— (1989), Illustrated London News, 1917–1919.
- ——— (1989), Illustrated London News, 1920–1922.
- ——— (1989), Smith, Marie (ed.), Thirteen Detectives.
- ——— (1989), Collected Works of G.K. Chesterton: Plays.
- ——— (1990), Smith, Marie (ed.), Seven Suspects.
- ——— (1990), de Silva, Alvaro (ed.), Brave New Family.
- ——— (1990), Illustrated London News, 1923–1925.
- ——— (1991), Illustrated London News, 1926–1928.
- ——— (1991), Illustrated London News, 1929–1931.
- ——— (1991), The Mask of Midas.
- ——— (1994), Collected Works of G. K. Chesterton: Collected Poetry: Part 1.
- ——— (1997), Platitudes Undone (annotations), Platitudes in the Making by Holbrook Jackson.
- ——— (1997), Sparkes, Russel (ed.), Prophet of Orthodoxy: The Wisdom of G. K. Chesterton.
- ——— (2000), Eugenics and Other Evils.
- ——— (2000), On Lying in Bed and Other Essays.
- ——— (2001), Criticisms and Appreciations of the works of Charles Dickens.
- ——— (2001), The G.K. Chesterton Papers: Additional Manuscripts.
- ——— (2002), Chesterton Day by Day: The Wit and Wisdom of G. K. Chesterton.
- ——— (2003), Essential Writings.
- ——— (2004), G. K. Chesterton's Early Poetry: Greybeards at Play, The White Knight and Other Poems, The Ballad of the White Horse.
- ——— (2011), Illustrated London News, 1932–1934.
- ——— (2011), Stapleton, Julia (ed.), G. K. Chesterton at the Daily News: Literature, Liberalism, and Revolution, Part 1, volumes 1–4, Pickering & Chatto.
- ——— (2012), Stapleton, Julia (ed.), G. K. Chesterton at the Daily News: Literature, Liberalism, and Revolution, Part 2, volumes 5–8, Pickering & Chatto.

== Prose fiction ==
=== Novels ===
- The Napoleon of Notting Hill (1904)
- The Man Who Was Thursday: A Nightmare (1908)
- The Ball and the Cross (1909)
- Manalive (1912)
- The Flying Inn (1914)
- The Return of Don Quixote (1927)
- The Floating Admiral (1931) (with other authors from the Detection Club)

=== Short stories and collections ===
- The Club of Queer Trades (1905)
- The Man Who Knew Too Much (1922)
- Tales of the Long Bow (1925)
- The Sword of Wood (1928)
- The Poet and the Lunatics (1929)
- Four Faultless Felons (1930)
- Stories, Essays And Poems (1935)

==== Father Brown ====
1. The Innocence of Father Brown (1911)
2. The Wisdom of Father Brown (1914)
3. "The Donnington Affair" (The Premier, November 1914; with Sir Max Pemberton) (uncollected short story)
4. The Incredulity of Father Brown (1926)
5. The Secret of Father Brown (1927)
6. The Scandal of Father Brown (1935)
7. "The Mask of Midas" (1936) (uncollected short story)

==== Omnibus editions ====
- The Complete Father Brown (Penguin Classics) (2012) (ISBN 9780141193854)
- The Complete Father Brown (Timaios Press) (ISBN 9789187611230)
- The Collected Works of G. K. Chesterton volumes 12 and 13
