= Fancies Versus Fads =

Collection of essays by G.K. Chesterton

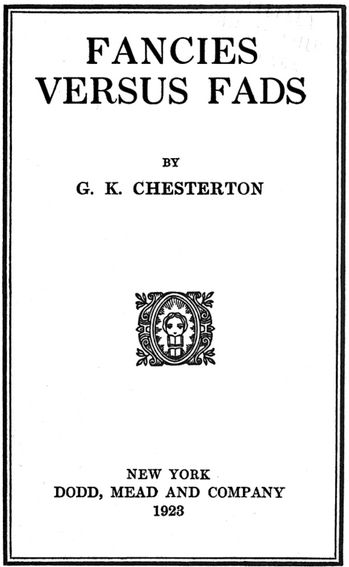
- Author: G. K. Chesterton
- Language: English
- Publisher: Dodd, Mead & Co.
- Publication date: 1923
- Pages: 274
- Text: Fancies Versus Fads at Wikisource

Fancies Versus Fads is a 1923 book by G. K. Chesterton. Published by Dodd, Mead & Co., it is a collection of 30 of Chesterton's essays from the New Witness, the London Mercury, and The Illustrated London News. The essays are on various topics, described by the author as "ranging from lady barristers to cavemen, and from psychoanalysis to free verse."

== Summary ==
Fancies Versus Fads is a collection of 30 essays which had been published in the New Witness, the London Mercury, and The Illustrated London News, written by G. K. Chesterton. Described in the author's words as "sketches," "notes," "visions," "idle journalistic jottings" or "frivolous essays," each chapter deals with a different fad. Published by Dodd, Mead & Co., it is considered a typifying example of Chesterton's criticism of modernity and was described by The Nation as "almost a complete collection of [his] antipathies." The essays "concern all sorts of things from lady barristers to cavemen, and from psychoanalysis to free verse," but were described as having "this amount of unity in their wandering, that they all imply that it is only a more traditional spirit that is truly able to wander."

=== Essays ===
1. The Romance of Rhyme
2. Hamlet and the Psycho-Analyst
3. The Meaning of Mock Turkey
4. Shakespeare and the Legal Lady
5. On Being an Old Bean
6. The Fear of the Film
7. Wings and the Housemaid
8. The Slavery of Free Verse
9. Prohibition and the Press
10. The Mercy of Mr. Arnold Bennett
11. A Defence of Dramatic Unities
12. The Boredom of Butterflies
13. The Terror of a Toy
14. False Theory and the Theatre
15. The Secret Society of Mankind
16. The Sentimentalism of Divorce
17. Street Cars and Stretching the Law
18. Why Reformers Go Wrong
19. The Innocence of the Criminal
20. The Prudery of the Feminists
21. How Mad Laws Are Made
22. The Pagoda of Progress
23. The Myth of the "Mayflower"
24. Much Too Modern History
25. The Evolution of Slaves
26. Is Darwin Dead?
27. Turning Inside Out
28. Strikes and the Spirit of Wonder
29. A Note on Old Nonsense
30. Milton and Merry England

== Reception ==
According to Dale Ahlquist, Fancies Versus Fads is one of Chesterton's best essay collections. A review from writers at the Hartford Courant said that "it is hard to close this wise, witty, clear-seeing book" and that it is "compact of delight; it may not be Mr. Chesterton at his supreme best throughout but there are bits which are so precious that it is only once and again that this brilliant, sane, and wholly delightful writer, has surpassed them." A review from the Oakland Tribune described Fancies Versus Fads as Chesterton at his best, and said that few modern essays were as good as those from the book.

The St. Louis Globe-Democrat described Fancies Versus Fads as follows: "In [it] Mr. Chesterton knocks all our preconceived notions in the scrap heap, and then tells us that there is no scrap heap. He discusses with his usual scintillating humor and lucidity of style ... He vacillates from the serious to the humorous, or, to use our hackneyed old friend, from the sublime to the ridiculous ... The book is colored by the author's political and religious views, but they are interesting." Those from the periodical Catholic World considered it not entirely as good as some of his prior books, although "like all his books almost every paragraph has in it something brilliant and profound," but said that the final chapter, "Milton and Merry England," was perhaps the best work of that type ever written by Chesterton.

Several had less positive reviews of Fancies Versus Fads. J. B. Priestley, writing in The Spectator, noted that he believed the book was the same as previous Chesterton essay collections, except for it being on controversial topics and that "the style ... is not quite so good as it used to be; it is more fixed and more wordy." A review from The Times said, "These papers are mixed in subject. But they are mixed in a more deadly sense, mixed in purpose and mixed in argument; and that seems sad in a book by Mr. Chesterton."
