= Four Faultless Felons =

1930 book by G. K. Chesterton

First edition cover

Four Faultless Felons is a collection of stories by G. K. Chesterton, comprising four mystery novelettes connected by the theme of persons assumed to be criminals, who are paradoxically not so. Published in 1930 in London by Cassell and in New York by Dodd, Mead & Co., it was the final collection of mystery stories that appeared during Chesterton's lifetime.

The stories were originally published individually. "The Moderate Murderer" and "The Ecstatic Thief" appeared in Cassell's Magazine in April and September 1929, and "The Honest Quack" and "The Loyal Traitor" in the July 1929 and May 1930 editions of The Story-Teller. Chesterton added the prologue and epilogues for the book release to connect the four narratives.

== Plot ==
=== The Moderate Murderer ===
Mr. Hume confesses to the attempted murder of Lord Tallboys.

=== The Honest Quack ===
Concerning Dr. Judson and an alleged fraud.

=== The Ecstatic Thief ===
A thief is caught breaking into the Nadaway family safe.

=== The Loyal Traitor ===
Portents of revolution stir in the land of Pavonia.

== Critical reception ==
The collection was critically well received upon its publication, with praise for Chesterton's wit, unique creative style and profound themes, intermixed with an unusual approach to detective fiction.

Critic Ralph Straus in The Sunday Times called it an "exhilarating" book, though not quite Chesterton's best. The Yorkshire Post meanwhile compared the book to the Father Brown stories, but longed for a similar grounding force in the narrative.

Though the majority of reviews were positive, some criticized the collection. Cecil Roberts found the stories entertaining, though confusing with weak denouements. The Northern Whig and Belfast Post felt let down by plot inconsistencies. Truth claimed the bookl to be bordering on self-parody, as it was similar in style to other Chesterton works but less inventive. Gerald Gould in The Observer provided a negative view, objecting to the "trick" of Chesterton's paradoxical plots.

In the United States, the book was also well received. Critic Will Cuppy singled out "The Honest Quack" for particular praise, and Bruce Rae in The New York Times was likewise enthusiastic.

The collection was reprinted in 1962 by Darwen Finlayson, a "recommended reprint" by The Guardian's Richard West.

More recently, scholar Ian Boyd described Four Faultless Felons as a blend of The Club of Queer Trades and The Man Who Was Thursday. Its protagonists were very similar to other Chesterton characters, Boyd observed, "artist-poets whose apparent madness is the true norm of sanity." Political and social issues reflected in the text did not cohere into a clear perspective, and Catholicism and Distributism, major through-lines of Chesterton's thought, were not clearly represented, though the books reflection on post-war society was filled with Chesterton's preoccupations at the time. Themes included parables of modern imperialism and social revolution, yet lacked specific calls to action. Boyd considered the work to be extremely well constructed, albeit ultimately without a true thematic unity.

Chesterton expert Dale Ahlquist, on the other hand, found great profundity in the stories, comparing them to Manalive and The Club of Queer Trades. "Lovely little mysteries with a twist...he has sewn an intricate tapestry with the minimum number of stitches."

Martin Gardner diverged from Ian Boyd's critique, finding Chesterton using the book to express his views on the economic exigencies of capitalism and his lifelong fascination with how semblances of evil paradoxically mask true goodness, in keeping with his Distributist and Catholic philosophies. Gardner countered the criticism, often levied at Chesterton, that his plots were too unbelievable, asserting that the author viewed his narratives as "a form of ingenious play, written primarily for entertainment."

Gardner also pointed out that the book contains numerous anti-Semitic tropes, speculating that those elements contributed to the book falling out of print and out of copyright in the United States. While such portrayals should not be excused, Gardner believed that there was nonetheless value to be gained from Chesterton's work.
