= JKP =

JKP may refer to:

- James Knox Polk, the 11th president of the United States
- Jessica Kingsley Publishers, a book publisher
- Jammu and Kashmir Police
- Jharkhand Party, an Indian political party
- Jaunā konservatīvā partija, a Latvian political party
- Jagadguru Kripalu Parishat, a Hindu spiritual organization based in India
- Paku language
- John Keith Prothero, pseudonym of author Ada Elizabeth Chesterton (nee Jones), wife of Cecil Edward Chesterton, brother of G K Chesterton
