= The Catholic Church and Conversion =

1926 book by G. K. Chesterton

The Catholic Church and Conversion is a book by G. K. Chesterton, published in 1926.

== Background ==
G. K. Chesterton was born in Campden Hill in Kensington, London, on 29 May 1874. He was raised as a Unitarian, however his family were not regular practitioners and as an infant Chesterton was baptized into the Church of England. Chesterton converted to Catholicism in 1922, at the age of 48. He was a prolific writer and wrote several works on Catholicism. Per Dale Ahlquist, Chesterton's saw his early writings on orthodox Christianity as "his own uncompleted conversion to Catholicism" and that these writings were responsible for several people converting to Catholicism themselves.

== Synopsis ==
In the book Chesterton writes about conversion and the Catholic Church, speaking about it in both a general sense and in reference to his own upbringing and conversion as an adult. Chesterton tells that before becoming a christian as an Anglo-Catholic, his own family background was liberal and unitarian. He argues that conversion takes place in three stages or states of mind:

1. In the first stage the convert sees himself as indifferent or detached, but "feels that he ought to be fair to the Church of Rome".
2. In the second stage the convert discovers that the Church “is larger on the inside than it is on the outside” and that he is now aware of both what Chesterton describes as both the truths and falsehoods of Catholicism and the Church.
3. Chesterton describes the third stage as "perhaps the truest and the most terrible. It is that in which the man is trying not to be converted."

Chesterton further notes that he found freedom of mind in the Catholic Church and that the institution is "the only thing that saves a man from the degrading slavery of being a child of his age.”

Per Ian Hunter, the work shows the common sense of Chesterton's thinking and his liking for paradox.

=== Contents ===
- Editor's Note
- I. Introductory: A New Religion
- II. The Obvious Blunders
- III. The Real Obstacles
- IV. The World Inside Out
- V. The Exception Proves the Rule
- VI. A Note on Present Prospects

== Publication history ==
The Catholic Church and Conversion was first published in 1926 through The MacMillan Company. Since its initial release the work has been republished several times. Ignatius Press released the work as part of The Collected Works of G. K. Chesterton in 1990 and as a 2006 standalone text. In 2022 LibriVox released an audiobook version of The Catholic Church and Conversion, read by Maria Therese.
