= The Return of Don Quixote =

1927 novel

The Return of Don Quixote is a novel by G. K. Chesterton. Published in 1927 by Chatto & Windus in London and by Dodd, Mead & Co. in New York, it was his final novel.

By 1963, when it was reprinted by Darwen Finlayson, it was considered one of his lesser-known works.

== Development ==
Chesterton began working on the novel prior to World War I, and returned to it sporadically over the years. In the 1920s, he began working on it again, when the turmoil following the war made literature more conducive to criticizing social institutions. Initially serialized in G. K.'s Weekly in 1925, the novel was ill-suited to the medium and was phased out of serialization, to be fully published in 1927.

In 1912, Chesterton published an essay in The New York Times also entitled "The Return of Don Quixote." In it, he mused about a latter-day returning of the character, placed into modern society: "I want to ask whether, if Don Quixote returned today with the same wild ways of knight errantry, it would not rather be the knight errant that was sensible and the world all around him that was crazy."

== Plot ==
Librarian Michael Hearne participates in an amateur reenactment play and develops a Don Quixote-like attitude, which gradually foments social revolution and a return to medievalism.

== Critical reception ==
The Return of Don Quixote garnered critical acclaim at the time of its publication. Reviewers applauded the wit and depth of the novel. Readers would enjoy the work, regardless of whether they appreciated its deeper meaning. Chesterton continued his track record of consistently entertaining and high quality writing, intermixed with profound thoughts.

The Scotsman appreciated the novel's swift moving plot. The Leeds Mercury called the novel "G. K. Chesterton at his best" Ralph Straus in The Bystander agreed, and called Chesterton "unplaceable" in a favorable review. The Sphere pointed out that Chesterton's humor undermined his being taken seriously, despite the heroic motivations of his satire.

While reviews were overwhelmingly positive, the Sheffield Daily Telegraph was disappointed in the didactic plot and longed for his earlier and more entertaining fantasy work. Similarly, Truth found it overall lacking in details to lend the narrative verisimilitude, leading to a jarring lack of believability.

In the United States, Donald Douglas of the New York Herald Tribune reviewed the novel favorably, while John Chamberlain of the New York Times found the work to be chaotic and bewildering.

More recently, Chesterton scholar Dale Ahlquist observed that while Hearne is the Quixote figure, it is actually Douglas Murrel who is the main character. The novel is stylistically different that Chesterton's other novels in its heavy usage of dialog. While some criticized the author's inclusion of his typical interests and preoccupations (such as Distributism), Ahlquist found no fault in this; Chesterton continued to champion the values that he found most enduring.

Philosopher Stephen R. L. Clark pointed out that the prime minister in the novel is the same as in Chesterton's Tales of the Long Bow, a source of pointed satire for the author. Clark also examined the accusation levied at Chesterton that he desired a reactionary return to medieval society, identifying instead a tension between two conceptions of medieval society, “a romanticized excuse for tyranny” vs “the flowering of medieval seeds into a really better world." Chesterton didn't actually want to go back to that early time period. Instead, he sought to learn from it.
