= W. R. Titterton =

William Richard Titterton (1876–1963) was a British journalist, writer and poet now remembered as the friend and first biographer of G. K. Chesterton. Titterton and Chesterton met on the London Daily News.

== Early life ==
In his younger days, he wrote copiously for A. R. Orage's The New Age. He was the model for some of Jacob Epstein's nude sculptures; he modelled too for George Grey Barnard, for the Harrisburg, Pennsylvania courthouse.

== The Weekly and the League ==
Titterton was in practical terms the organiser of Chesterton's Distributist League, and sub-editor of G. K.'s Weekly.

There were financial problems, and embarrassment caused by Titterton's commissioning of articles on H. G. Wells by the lesser writer Edwin Pugh; Pugh's articles had a hostile edge and Chesterton had to pacify Wells. His position on the Weekly came to an end in 1928, when he was replaced by Edward Macdonald, in a temporarily acrimonious situation, leading to the separation of the Weekly and the League.

Under Chesterton's influence, he became a Catholic convert in 1931.

== Works ==
- River Music and other poems (1900)
- Love Poems (New Age Press, c 1908)
- An Afternoon Tea Philosophy (1910)
- The Drifters (1910)
- Me As A Model (1914)
- London Scenes (1918)
- Guns and Guitars (1918) poems
- Drinking Songs and other songs (1928)
- A Candle to the Stars (1932) interviews
- G. K. Chesterton: A Portrait (1936) biography, Online text (PDF)
- Poems for the Forces (1943)
- London Pride (1944)
- So this is Shaw (1945) biography
- Poems: A Backward Glance (1959)
