= Chesterton Academy =

School in Hopkins, Minnesota

Location
- 1320 Mainstreet; Hopkins, (Hennepin County), Minnesota 55343; United States
- 44°54′25″N 93°19′46″W

Information
- Type: Private, Coeducational
- Motto: Cultura vitae (The culture of life)
- Religious affiliation: Roman Catholic
- Established: 2008
- CEEB code: 240-262
- Faculty: 15
- Grades: 9–12
- Student to teacher ratio: 8:1
- Colors: Navy Blue and Gold
- Website: www.chestertonacademy.org

Chesterton Academy is a private, co-ed, Catholic secondary school in Hopkins, Minnesota, United States. It is located in the Archdiocese of Saint Paul and Minneapolis.

Launched in the fall of 2008 by Dale Ahlquist and Tom Bengtson, the school is centered on G. K. Chesterton's ideas of integrated learning. In addition to its classical curriculum, it offers summer school programs, options for home-schooled students, and adult enrichment classes.

Chesterton Academy has been recognized as one of the "Top 50 Catholic High Schools for excellence in Catholic identity, academics and civics education" by the Cardinal Newman Society.

The Chesterton Schools Network, a network of similarly minded schools using the Chesterton Academy name and method of education, grew from the original school. As of 2024, there are 59 Chesterton Academies in 25 states and four countries.
