= Ada Elizabeth Chesterton =

British journalist & socialist (1869–1962)

Ada Chesterton OBE
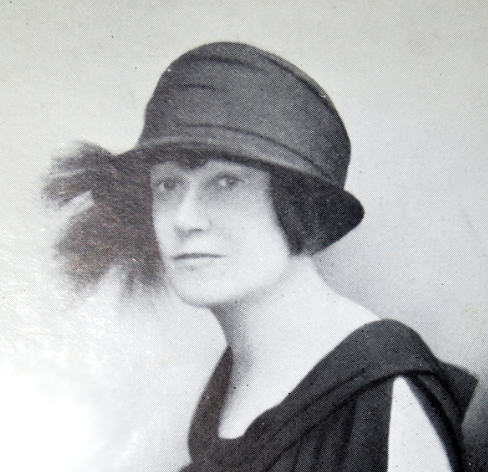
- Chesterton in her 1925 book
- Born: Ada Elizabeth Jones; 30 June 1869; Dulwich, United Kingdom
- Died: 20 January 1962 (aged 92); Croydon, United Kingdom
- Spouse: Cecil Chesterton (m. 1916; died 1918)
- Writing career
- Pen name: John Keith Prothero; Mrs. Cecil Chesterton
- Subject: Poverty
- Notable work: In Darkest London

Ada Elizabeth Chesterton OBE (née Jones; 30 June 1869 – 20 January 1962), also known by her pseudonym John Keith Prothero, was a British socialist, journalist, and philanthropist. Her best known work was In Darkest London.

== Life ==
Chesterton was born in Dulwich in 1869. She was working in Fleet Street at the age of sixteen. She was known for writing under pseudonyms including John Keith Prothero. She met Edith Nesbit, Havelock Ellis, George Bernard Shaw, H. G. Wells, Beatrice Webb, Eleanor Marx, Edith Lees and Annie Besant as a result of joining Edward Pease's Fabian Society.

She had a lifelong relationship with Cecil Chesterton who was also a journalist and the brother of G. K. Chesterton. The pair appeared together on 7 January 1914 in King's Hall, Covent Garden, when, as "Miss J. K. Prothero", she played Princess Puffer in the mock trial of John Jasper for the murder of Edwin Drood. Cecil acted for the defence, G. K. Chesterton was Judge and George Bernard Shaw was foreman of the jury.

They married in 1916, before he left to be a soldier during the First World War. She went to work with her brother. Her husband survived being wounded but he eventually became sick with nephritis. Chesterton travelled to his bedside just before he died and she was the only family member at his funeral.

After her husband died she went to Poland funded by the Daily Express. She took a dare to live in poverty in London in 1925 lasting much longer than the few days that were expected. These newspaper articles were eventually published as her first book, In Darkest London. She created other similar books based on the success of her first book. She worked at the drama critic for her brother-in-law's journal G. K.'s Weekly and in 1941 wrote a biography about "The Chestertons".

She created the Cecil Houses, known today as Central & Cecil Housing Trust, which provided accommodation for women who no place to stay. They were funded thanks to the publicity that her living in poverty books created. The houses were named for her late husband.

Chesterton was made an Officer of the British Empire in 1938 and converted to Catholicism four years later. She died in a nursing home in Croydon in 1962.

== Cecil Houses ==
In March 1927, the first Cecil House opened its doors to 44 women and two babies. Less than a year later, in January 1928, her second house was opened in Kings Cross, providing shelter for 58 women and 12 babies. In March 1929, the third house in North Kensington, opened for 60 women and 18 babies. In November 1930, a property in Harrow Road opened for another 60 women and 18 babies. And in March 1934, the property in Waterloo that is now C&C's central office was opened for 49 women and two babies.

By 1935, Mrs Chesterton Lodging Houses had received recognition and donations from across the world. It became a refuge for women across the capital who could seek shelter without any questions asked.

For over 90 years, Cecil Houses have continued to take inspiration from Mrs Chesterton merging with social housing charities and care providers for the elderly, eventually becoming a Housing Association in 1974. Today, Cecil Houses are known as C&C, a not-for-profit housing provider for over-55s, offering affordable housing services including sheltered and care accommodation. Their Central Offices can still be found in an old Cecil House building on Waterloo Road.

== Works ==
- The man who was Thursday. [A play in three acts.] Adapted from the novel of G. K. Chesterton 1926
- In Darkest London 1926
- St. Teresa 1928
- The Love Game: A Comedy in Three Acts 1926 (West End 1931)
- My Russian Venture 1931
- Women of the Underworld 1932
- Young China and New Japan 1933
- Sickle or Swastika? 1935
- This Thy Body, An Experience in Osteopathy 1937
- I Lived in a Slum 1938
- What Price Youth? 1939
- The Chestertons: By Mrs. Cecil Chesterton 1941
- Salute The Soviet 1942
