= The Club of Queer Trades =

1905 book by G. K. Chesterton

- First edition
- Author: G. K. Chesterton
- Language: English
- Genre: Mystery Short Stories
- Publisher: Harper & Brothers
- Publication date: 1905
- Publication place: United Kingdom

The Club of Queer Trades is a collection of stories by G. K. Chesterton first published in 1905.

Each story in the collection is centred on a person who is making his living by some novel and extraordinary means. To gain admittance one must have invented a unique means of earning a living and the subsequent trade being the main source of income.

== Stories ==
The framing narrative by "Cherub" Swinburne describes his quest for The Club of Queer Trades with his friend Basil Grant, a retired judge, and Rupert Grant, a private detective who is Basil's younger brother. Each of the stories describes their encounter with one of the trades.

=== The Tremendous Adventures of Major Brown ===
First appeared in Harper’s Weekly [v47, 19 December 1903]

While investigating a case of assault brought by Major Brown, Rupert Grant, the private detective, and his brother Basil stumble upon the Adventure and Romance Agency, Limited, an agency that creates adventures for its clients. The story is notable for prefiguring the concept of the alternate reality game.

=== The Painful Fall of a Great Reputation ===
Basil Grant investigates Wimpole, the great raconteur.

=== The Awful Reason of the Vicar's Visit ===
First appeared in Harper’s Weekly [v48, 28 May & 4 June 1904]

"Cherub" Swinburne is asked to investigate the mysterious assault on the Vicar of Chuntsey (in Essex).

=== The Singular Speculation of the House-Agent ===
First appeared in Harper’s Weekly [v48, 11 and 18 June 1904]

Basil Grant investigates the mystery of Lieutenant Keith, whose house, "The Elms", Buxton Common, cannot be found.

=== The Noticeable Conduct of Professor Chadd ===
First appeared in Harper’s Weekly [v48, 25 June 1904]

Basil Grant finds out why Professor Chadd insists on dancing.

=== The Eccentric Seclusion of the Old Lady ===
First appeared in Harper’s Weekly [v48, 9 & 16 July 1904]

Rupert Grant rescues a lady from her kidnappers but cannot understand why she refuses to be rescued. The answer leads to the final unveiling of the mystery of the Club of Queer Trades.
