= Manalive =

1912 novel by G. K. Chesterton

- First edition
- Author: G. K. Chesterton
- Language: English
- Genre: Comedy, Mystery novel
- Publisher: John Lane
- Publication date: 1912
- Publication place: United Kingdom
- Media type: Print (hardback and paperback)

Manalive (1912) is a book by G. K. Chesterton detailing a popular theme both in his own philosophy, and in Christianity, of the "holy fool", such as in Dostoevsky's The Idiot and Cervantes' Don Quixote.

== Plot summary ==
This is a book in two parts. The first, "The Enigma of Innocent Smith", concerns the arrival of a new tenant at Beacon House, a London boarding establishment. Like Mary Poppins, this man (who is tentatively identified by lodger Arthur Inglewood as an ex-schoolmate named Innocent Smith) is accompanied by a great wind, and he breathes new life into the household with his games and antics. During his first day in residence the eccentric Smith creates the High Court of Beacon; arranges to elope with Mary Gray, paid companion to heiress Rosamund Hunt; inspires Inglewood to declare his love for Diana Duke, the landlady's niece; and prompts a reconciliation between jaded journalist Michael Moon and Rosamund.

However, when the household is at its happiest two doctors appear with awful news: Smith is wanted on charges of burglary, desertion of a spouse, polygamy, and attempted murder. The fact that Smith almost immediately fires several shots from a revolver at Inglewood's friend Dr. Herbert Warner seems to confirm the worst. Before Smith can be taken to a jail or an asylum, Michael Moon declares that the case falls under the purview of the High Court of Beacon and suggests that the household investigate the matter before involving the authorities or the press.

The second part, "The Explanations of Innocent Smith," follows the trial. The prosecution consists of Moses Gould, a merrily cynical Jew who lives at Beacon House and considers Smith at best a fool and at worst a scoundrel, and Dr. Cyrus Pym, an American criminal specialist called in by Dr. Warner; Michael Moon and Arthur Inglewood act for the defense. The evidence consists of correspondence from people who witnessed or participated in the exploits that led to the charges against Smith. In every case, the defendant is revealed to be, as his first name states, innocent. He fires bullets near people to make them value life; the house he breaks into is his own; he travels around the world only to return with renewed appreciation for his house and family; and the women he absconded with are actually his wife Mary, posing as a spinster under different aliases so they may repeatedly re-enact their courtship.

Smith is, needless to say, acquitted on all charges.

== Film adaptations ==
The book was first adapted in French, as a Belgian film titled Le revolver aux cheveux rouges (1973).

Dale Ahlquist, president of the American Chesterton Society, with screenwriter, producer and director Joey Odendahl, produced the American motion picture Manalive (2012), starring Mark P. Shea as Innocent Smith and Kevin O'Brian as Professor Eames. A private screening of the movie was shown at the American Chesterton Society's 31st Annual Chesterton Conference in Reno, NV, on 3 August 2012.
