= The Poet and the Lunatics =

1929 work by G. K. Chesterton

The Poet and the Lunatics: Episodes in the Life of Gabriel Gale is a 1929 work by G. K. Chesterton. It consists of a series of short stories about Gabriel Gale, who is a poet and painter. Every story involves another character who is mad in some way. The work is sometimes called a novel, and usually categorized as detective fiction.

The stories were first published in Nash's Magazine in 1921. John C. Tibbetts describes them as "among Chesterton's most evocative twilight tales."

== Contents ==
- The Fantastic Friends
- The Yellow Bird
- The Shadow of the Shark
- The Crime of Gabriel Gale
- The Finger of Stone
- The House of the Peacock
- The Purple Jewel
- The Asylum of Adventure

== Editions ==
- — (1929). The poet and the lunatics: Episodes in the life of Gabriel Gale (1st ed.). New York City: Dodd, Mead & Company. OCLC 708738. OL 27784461M.
- — (1929). The poet and the lunatics: Episodes in the life of Gabriel Gale (Catholic Book Club ed.). New York City: Dodd, Mead & Company. OCLC 977633528. OL 49216830M.
- — (1929). The poet and the lunatics: Episodes in the life of Gabriel Gale. Bernhard Tauchnitz. OL 20028470M.
- — (1929). The poet and the lunatics: Episodes in the life of Gabriel Gale. London: Cassell and company. OCLC 3108849. OL 6730946M.
- — (1955). The poet and the lunatics: Episodes in the life of Gabriel Gale. New World Chesterton. New York City: Sheed and Ward. OCLC 3232721. OL 6177569M.
- — (1963). The poet and the lunatics: Episodes in the life of Gabriel Gale. G. K. Chesterton reprint series. Philadelphia: Dufour editions. LCCN 62020607. OL 5858153M.
- — (29 November 2006). The poet and the lunatics: Episodes in the life of Gabriel Gale (HTML). Leicester, UK: Martin Ward.
- — (November 2008). The poet and the lunatics: Episodes in the life of Gabriel Gale. Dodo Press. ISBN 978-1-4099-3126-3.
- — (17 December 2010). The poet and the lunatics: Episodes in the life of Gabriel Gale. Dover Publications. ISBN 978-0-486-47843-2. OCLC 662153666.
- — (March 2013). The poet and the lunatics: Episodes in the life of Gabriel Gale (HTML). Sydney: Project Gutenberg Australia.
