= The Paradoxes of Mr. Pond =

1936 collection of detective stories by G. K. Chesterton

- First edition
- Author: G. K. Chesterton
- Language: English
- Genre: Mystery short stories
- Publisher: Cassell
- Publication date: 1936
- Publication place: Great Britain

The Paradoxes of Mr. Pond is G. K. Chesterton's final collection of detective stories, published after his death in 1936. Of the eight mysteries, seven were first printed in the Storyteller magazine. The Unmentionable Man was unique to the book.

The stories revolve around a civil servant named Mr. Pond (we are not told his first name). He is described as a very ordinary and fish-like man who has a habit of startling those who meet him with outrageous paradoxical statements. He seems unaware of the oddness of his remarks, and his friend Sir Hubert Wotton explains: "he looks a very sedentary, scientific little cuss... but he's really had very extraordinary experiences. He doesn't talk about them; he doesn't want to talk about them... but when, in the course of talking in the abstract he comes on some concrete thing that he has actually done – well, I can only say he crumples it up. He tries to crush it into a small space and it simply sounds contradictory. Almost every one of those crazy sentences simply stands for one of the adventures in what would be called by most people a very unadventurous life."

Chesterton himself was well known for using paradox in his writings, but in one story he explains that his kind of paradox is different from Mr. Pond's:

Paradox has been defined as "Truth standing on her head to get attention." Paradox has been defended; on the ground that so many fashionable fallacies still stand firmly on their feet, because they have no heads to stand on. But it must be admitted that writers, like other mendicants and mountebanks, frequently do try to attract attention. They set out conspicuously, in a single line in a play, or at the head or tail of a paragraph, remarks of this challenging kind; as when Mr. Bernard Shaw wrote: "The Golden Rule is that there is no Golden Rule"; or Oscar Wilde observed: "I can resist everything except temptation"; or a duller scribe (not to be named with these and now doing penance for his earlier vices in the nobler toil of celebrating the virtues of Mr. Pond) said in defence of hobbies and amateurs and general duffers like himself: "If a thing is worth doing, it is worth doing badly." To these things do writers sink; and then the critics tell them that they "talk for effect"; and then the writers answer: "What the devil else should we talk for? Ineffectualness?"

In four of the stories Pond is induced to tell the dramatic tale which lies behind a baffling paradox; in another, "Pond the Pantaloon", Wotton tells the story. In two more, "The Crime of Captain Gahagan" and "The Terrible Troubadour", Pond's keen mind arrives at the truth when his friend Gahagan is accused of murder. In "Ring of Lovers" Gahagan tells a true story and trusts to Pond to guess the secret behind it.

These stories written at the end of Chesterton's career contain narrative stretches and improbabilities, but they do not lack his familiar flashes of insight. In the story The Crime of Captain Gahagan Chesterton observes, through the character of Mr. Pond, that "Love never needs time. But friendship always needs time. More and more time, until up past midnight."

== Characters ==
The main characters in the book are Mr. Pond, his friend Captain Peter Gahagan, a romantic and impulsive Irishman, and a well-known government official, Sir Hubert Wotton. Also mentioned in more than one chapter are Violet Varney, an actress, and her sister Joan, to whom Gahagan proposes after being suspected of having an affair with Lord Crome's wife in "Ring of Lovers". Joan, now married to Gahagan, appears in the framing sequence of "A Tall Story".

== Stories ==
=== The Three Horsemen of the Apocalypse ===
The paradox is introduced when a casual discussion turns to matters of European politics, and Pond recalls an episode during a war between the Prussians and the Polish. The fact, insists Pond, to Wotton's dismay, is that the Prussian soldiers were too obedient. Marshal Von Grock failed in his attempt to execute the influential Polish poet and singer Paul Petrowski because two of his soldiers did precisely what he asked.

The whole thing went wrong because the discipline was too good. Grock's soldiers obeyed him too well; so he simply couldn't do a thing he wanted....It is a military fact that Grock failed, because two of his soldiers obeyed him. It is a military fact that he might have succeeded, if one of them had disobeyed him.

=== The Crime of Captain Gahagan ===
The chapter begins with Pond being interviewed by a garrulous American journalist who cannot finish a sentence without interrupting herself. This supplies a clue to Pond when a lawyer accuses Pond's acquaintance Captain Gahagan of murdering his client, the husband of a woman Gahagan had been spending much time with. After hearing the lawyer's story of what Gahagan said when leaving the Varney house, Pond introduces the paradox: Gahagan said exactly the same thing to all three witnesses, despite their conflicting reports.

=== When Doctors Agree ===
The paradox, simply put, is that two doctors once agreed so thoroughly that one naturally murdered the other. In the framing sequence mention is made of an agreement between the Poles and the Lithuanians about Wilno, and Pond mentions Tweedledum and Tweedledee (who agreed to have a battle) and tells the story of a protracted argument over morality which came to an abrupt conclusion.

=== Pond the Pantaloon ===
Pond introduces the paradox—that the pencil was relatively red, which was why it made such black marks—but Gahagan must go to Wotton for the explanation. Wotton tells the story of how Pond saved England and was shot at five times in a railway station waiting room, all because of the "pencil" which made the "black marks".

=== The Unmentionable Man ===
During a discussion of deportation, Pond mentions a man who was so well-regarded that officials longed to deport him – but could not. In the capital of a European republic with an oppressive government and an active revolutionary movement, Mr Louis sits in the central square and entertains all and sundry. His identity is a well-kept secret, but Pond guesses it.

=== Ring of Lovers ===
This story centres on Captain Gahagan, described by Mr. Pond as "a very truthful man... [who] tells wanton and unnecessary lies". The captain tells a (true) story of a dreadful dinner party which ended in death, and explains how it induced him to propose to the woman he loves.

=== The Terrible Troubadour ===
The paradox, "In Nature you must go very low to find things that go so high", in this case is not Mr. Pond's, but his friend Dr. Paul Green's. Green introduces the Vicar of Hanging Burgess, who accuses Captain Gahagan of having, many years ago, shot a rival in love, dumped the body and then run away to the war. From the Vicar's eyewitness description of the incident, Pond divines the truth.

=== A Tall Story ===
Mr Pond, Sir Henry Wotton, Captain Gahagan and his new wife Joan are discussing the treatment of Jews in Germany, and Pond recalls an incident in the last war when a Jew who had adopted a German name was suspected of being a spy. He describes the persecution of officials by "spy-maniacs" who reported all sorts of "suspicious behaviour", while the real spies passed unnoticed—including the spy who was "too tall to be seen".

== Radio ==
5 of the 8 stories (1,2,4,6,7 of the list above) were produced as 15 minute radio stories for BBC Radio 4 Extra, read by Martin Jarvis. Broadcast 13–17 May 2014.
