= Cecil Chesterton =

English journalist (1879–1918)

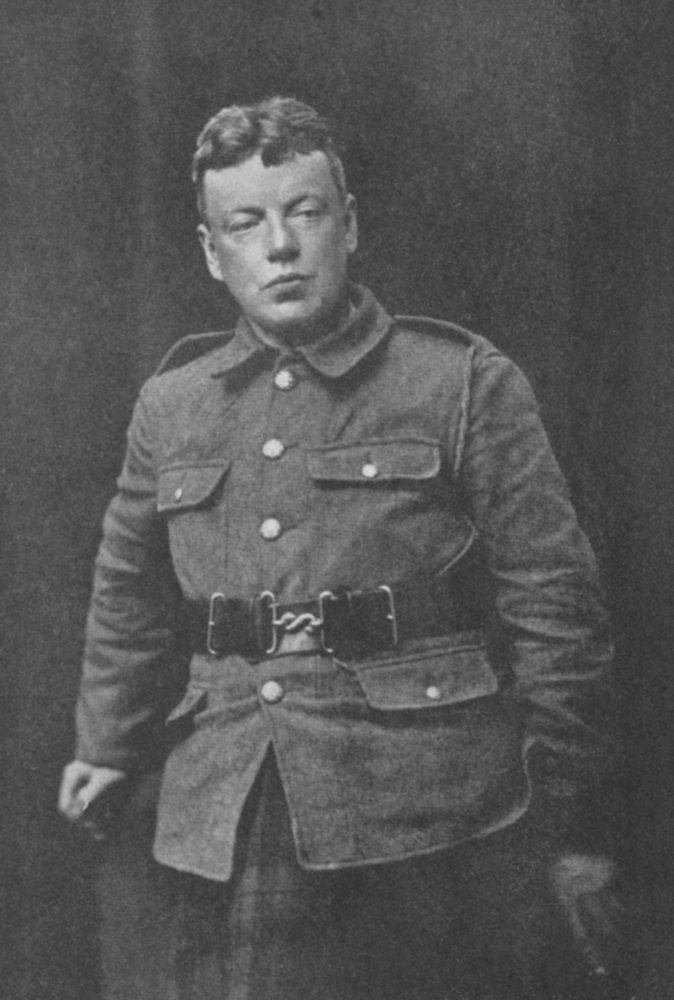
- Chesterton in uniform, c. 1917
- Born: 12 November 1879; London, United Kingdom
- Died: 6 December 1918 (aged 39); Wimereux, France
- Resting place: Terlincthun British Cemetery (Wimille, France)
- Spouse: Ada Jones (m. 1916)
- Relatives: G. K. Chesterton (brother)
- Military career
- Allegiance: United Kingdom
- Branch: British Army
- Service years: 1916–1918
- Unit: Highland Light Infantry
- Conflicts: World War I

Cecil Edward Chesterton (12 November 1879 – 6 December 1918) was an English journalist, political commentator and soldier, known particularly for his role as editor of The New Witness from 1912 to 1916, and in relation to its coverage of the Marconi scandal.

== Life ==
He was the younger brother of G. K. Chesterton, a first cousin once removed of A. K. Chesterton, and a close associate of Hilaire Belloc. While the ideas of distributism came from all three, and Arthur Penty, he was the most ideological and combative by temperament. His death, according to his widow, removed the theorist of the movement.

He was born in Kensington, London, and educated at St Paul's School, then worked for a small publisher for a time. He then qualified as surveyor and estate agent, with a view to entering his father's business, which is still flourishing today. In 1901 he joined the Fabian Society, with which he was closely involved for about six years. From 1907 he wrote for A. R. Orage's The New Age. In 1908 he published an anonymous biography of his better-known brother, G. K. Chesterton, a Criticism, but his authorship was quickly discovered.

Chesterton had been one of the 'Anti-Puritan League' of the 1890s, with Stewart Headlam (who stood bail for Oscar Wilde), Edgar Jepson and his brother; and then a member of Henry Scott Holland's Christian Social Union. While Chesterton was writing from a socialist point of view for Orage, he was also moving to an Anglo-Catholic religious stance. In 1911 he started editorial work for Belloc, with whom he wrote in The Party System, a criticism of party politics. In 1912 he formally became a Roman Catholic.

That same year he bought Belloc's failing weekly Eye-Witness; Charles Granville who published it had been made bankrupt. He renamed it The New Witness, editing it for four years before enlisting in the army, and turning it into a scandal sheet. His persistent attacks on prominent political figures involved in the Marconi scandal (such as Lloyd George), and his public defence of his position in terms of a 'Jewish problem', have left him with a reputation as an anti-Semite. He was successfully brought to court by Godfrey Isaacs, one of those attacked, although the damages awarded were nominal. A government investigation revealed that high government officials had engaged in insider trading in the stock of Marconi's American subsidiary, but the quantity of stocks they were known to have purchased was relatively small.

On 7 January 1914 Chesterton acted for the defence in the mock-trial of John Jasper for the murder of Edwin Drood in Covent Garden. G.K. Chesterton was Judge and Cecil's future wife played Princess Puffer. George Bernard Shaw was foreman of the jury.

In 1916 he married journalist Ada Elizabeth Jones, later known as a writer, after a long courtship. He joined the Highland Light Infantry as a private soldier. His brother Gilbert took over the paper, with Ada as Secretary and Business Manager. Eventually in 1925 Gilbert, with great reluctance, allowed it to be renamed G. K.'s Weekly because his name was very well-known and likely to attract interest.

He was three times wounded fighting in France, and died in a military hospital in Wimereux of nephritis on 6 December 1918. His wife Ada had rushed to his bedside and she arrived just before he died. She was his only relative at his funeral, when he was buried at the Terlincthun British Cemetery, Wimille. Although sick, he had refused to leave his post until the Armistice. On 13 December, G. K. Chesterton would report his death in the New Witness, noting that "He lived long enough to march to the victory which was for him a supreme vision of liberty and the light."

== Works ==
- Gladstonian Ghosts. London: S.C. Brown Langham & Co., 1905.
- G.K. Chesterton: a Criticism. London: Alston Rivers, 1908.
- The People's Drink. London: The New Age Press, 1909.
- Party and People: A Criticism of the Recent Elections and Their Consequences. London: Alston Rivers, Limited, 1910.
- The Party System, with Hilaire Belloc. London: Stephen Swift, 1911.
- Nell Gwyn. London: T.N. Foulis, 1912 (1st Pub. 1911).
- The Prussian hath said in his Heart. London: Chapman and Hall, 1914.
- Debate between George Sylvester Viereck and Cecil Chesterton. New York: The Fatherland Corporation, 1915.
- The Perils of Peace. London: T.W. Laurie, Ltd., 1916.
- A History of the United States. London: J.M. Dent & Sons, 1919.

=== Articles ===
- "Democracy and the Great State." In: Socialism and the Great State. New York and London: Harper & Brother Publishers, 1912.
- "The Barbarians." In: Alfred Bingham (ed.), Handbook of the European War. New York: H. W. Wilson Company, 1914.
- "The Art of Controversy: Macaulay, Huxley and Newman," The Catholic World, Vol. CV, April/September 1917.

=== Other ===
- Hubert Bland, Essays, with an Introduction by Cecil Chesterton. London: Max Goschen, Ltd., 1914.
