= The New Jerusalem (Chesterton book) =

1920 travelogue by G. K. Chesterton

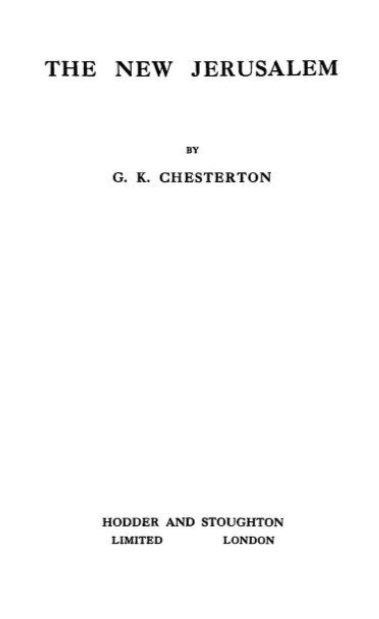
- Title page for The New Jerusalem (1920)
- Author: G. K. Chesterton
- Publisher: Hodder and Stoughton
- Publication date: 1920

The New Jerusalem is a 1920 book by the English author and journalist G. K. Chesterton. Dale Ahlquist calls it a "philosophical travelogue" of Chesterton's journey across Europe to Palestine.

== Quotes ==
- "On the road to Cairo one may see twenty groups exactly like that of the Holy Family in the pictures of the Flight into Egypt; with only one difference. The man is riding on the ass."
- "The real mistake of the Muslims is something much more modern in its application than any particular passing persecution of Christians as such. It lay in the very fact that they did think they had a simpler and saner sort of Christianity, as do many modern Christians. They thought it could be made universal merely by being made uninteresting. Now a man preaching what he thinks is a platitude is far more intolerant than a man preaching what he admits is a paradox. It was exactly because it seemed self-evident, to Muslims as to Bolshevists, that their simple creed was suited to everybody, that they wished in that particular sweeping fashion to impose it on everybody."
