= G. K.'s Weekly =

British newspaper

G.K.'s Weekly was a British publication founded in 1925 (with its pilot edition surfacing in late 1924) by writer G. K. Chesterton, continuing until his death in 1936. Its articles typically discussed topical cultural, political, and socio-economic issues yet the publication also ran poems, cartoons, and other such material that piqued Chesterton's interest. It contained much of his journalistic work done in the latter part of his life, and extracts from it were published as the book The Outline of Sanity. Precursor publications existed by the names of The Eye-Witness and The New Witness, the former being a weekly newspaper started by Hilaire Belloc in 1911, the latter Belloc took over from Cecil Chesterton, Gilbert's brother, who died in World War I: and a revamped version of G. K.'s Weekly continued some years after Chesterton's death by the name of The Weekly Review.

As an alternative publication outside of the mainstream press of the time, G. K.'s Weekly never attained a particularly large readership, with its highest circulation being some eight thousand. However, it attracted significant support from several benefactors, which included notables such as the internationally famous conductor Sir Thomas Beecham. Individuals whose work appeared in G. K.'s Weekly include public figures such as E. C. Bentley, Alfred Noyes, Ezra Pound, and George Bernard Shaw as well as (at the very beginning of his career) George Orwell. The relationship between the Distributist League and G. K.'s Weekly being a very close one, the publication advocated the philosophy of distributism in contrast to both the centre-right and centre-left attitudes of the time regarding socialism and industrialism.

In terms of criticism, the publication has garnered condemnation for alleged antisemitic prejudice to be found in the views of Gilbert and Cecil Chesterton as well as of Hilaire Belloc. The controversy has involved sorting out the distinct differences in the opinions of the three men versus that of others within the publication, as essentially everyone featured had their own nuances to their viewpoints and would disagree among themselves. Critics have alleged that the writers often featured false stereotypes and made ignorant arguments about British capitalistic society while defenders have viewed the accusations as biased and misleading.

== History ==
Hilaire Belloc founded a weekly newspaper in 1911 that he titled The Eye-Witness. The publication lasted only a year, though it gained notoriety for publishing articles on the Marconi scandal. It was the first place in which Gilbert Chesterton released the famous poem Lepanto. Belloc focused his energies on anti-capitalist and anti-communist articles fighting against what he saw as the collusion of the many British government members with corrupt forces, writing in a brash style. Belloc relinquished the editorship to Cecil Chesterton but continued writing for it.

When Charles Granville, backer of The Eye-Witness, went bankrupt in 1912 Chesterton's father financed the magazine under the title The New Witness. The style and contents remained essentially the same. Gilbert Chesterton took over as editor in 1916 when his brother left to serve in the British Army during the Great War. Chesterton spent seven years (1916–1923) continuing at the helm of The New Witness, enduring the loss of his brother in 1918. Taking advice to fundamentally change the publication, on 21 March 1925, Chesterton unveiled G.K.'s Weekly.

With the continuation of G. K.'s Weekly even after Gilbert's death, with Belloc's son-in-law Reginald Jebb joining alongside Hilary Pepler to support the effort, the complete series of publications therefore reads as

The Eye-Witness (1911–1912) →
The New Witness (1912–1923) →
G. K.'s Weekly (1925–1936) →
The Weekly Review (1936/37 – 1948, when it became a short-lived monthly).

In total, the series of publications featured hundreds of articles, including well over a hundred poems. Some essays from G.K.'s Weekly have appeared in the books The Outline of Sanity, The Well and the Shallows, The End of the Armistice, The Common Man, and The Coloured Lands. Some originals of the weekly have been collected by educational institutions such as Christendom College.

== Background and content ==
=== Typical contents ===
The bulk of the material published was composed by Gilbert Chesterton himself (the precursor publications before 1925 had far less involvement by him). Besides standard works of a publication of its type at the time such as long essays and short news items, he intended to use it as a kind of 'scrapbook' and added a variety of other material such as poems, pieces of fiction, cartoons, and so on. He additionally would personally answer letters to the editor at times.

G.K.'s Weekly generally published from a viewpoint of distributism, social traditionalism, and democratic pluralism, with criticism against both 'big government' and 'big business' while in support of the 'common man' (in Chesterton's view) intermingled with commentary on social and cultural topics. He would condemn ideological trends such as Marxist-Leninism in depth while drawing upon his own strong Roman Catholic faith. As in his books, Chesterton was known for writing in the weekly in a pithy, witty style, such as with the following short book review: "Lenin by Leon Trotsky. The publication of this book has caused the exile of Trotsky; but there are books equally bad written every week without any specific punishment being inflicted".

In a 1932 work in the publication, Chesterton argued, "Communism is that form of Capitalism in which all workers have an equal wage. Capitalism is that form of Communism in which the organizing officials have a very large salary. That is the difference; and that is the only difference." He wrote in another writing published that same year, "The right and essential thing [is] that as many people as possible should have the natural, original forms of sustenance as their own property."

=== Distributism in context ===
The essential continuity under the main editorial figures (those mentioned above, and W. R. Titterton who was Gilbert's sub-editor), is a manifestation of the political and economic doctrine of distributism. This was mainly the work of Belloc, Gilbert and Cecil Chesterton, and Arthur Penty, and had its origins in an Edwardian-era split of Fabian socialism in London circles, around A. R. Orage and his prominent publication The New Age.

In founding The Eye-Witness, Belloc took a title of a book of essays of his own from a couple of years before, and drew initially on a group of writers more associated with The Speaker.

The papers under discussion in this article became, in practical terms, the organs of the distributist group. This came together as the Distributist League in 1926, as G. K.'s Weekly appeared as a revamped publication. The main business of the League, organisationally, fell to Titterton. The League had its own newsletter from 1931.

== Readership details with Chesterton as editor and campaigner ==
G. K.'s Weekly never picked up a particularly large readership, being viewed as outside of the mainstream press of the time. Its highest circulation worked out to only about eight thousand. Yet the weekly attracted significant support from several benefactors, including the internationally famous conductor Sir Thomas Beecham, many well-known writers contributed material, including E. C. Bentley, Alfred Noyes, Ezra Pound, and George Bernard Shaw.

The relationship between the Distributist League and G. K.'s Weekly was close, at times essentially inseparable. Chesterton travelled the country to local distributist chapters in order the spread the word about the publication and also to promote his viewpoints. G. K.'s Weekly provided little financially for Chesterton; it was not a lucrative venture by any means in his mind, but he kept it going as a gesture of respect for Cecil's memory. The financial state of the publication meant that contributors could expect little or no reward. One later famous name who first broke into journalism this way was George Orwell (then going by 'E. A. Blair').

Editorial policy in the latter days of G. K.'s Weekly in terms of foreign policy and also electoral politics involved nuanced positions, with Gilbert Chesterton providing a generally moderating influence. Chesterton, for example, held ambiguous and conflicted views about Italy under fascism. Until 1929, the Distributist League broadly supported the Labour Party and the British trade union movement. Sir Henry Slesser, a notable Labour Member of Parliament, served as one of the League's biggest supporters.

During the 1930s, the Soviet Union appeared the biggest enemy to the cause of the distributists, and a move towards monarchism and to support for fascist Italy took place. Upon Chesterton's death, G. K.'s Weekly openly backed the far-right forces of Francisco Franco during the Spanish Civil War. Nonetheless, the Distributist League and its followers backed the British declaration of war against the Axis powers in 1939.

Attitudes to Benito Mussolini specifically (whom GKC interviewed, see the Maisie Ward biography) in the 1930s has attracted attention. Chesterton made somewhat favourable remarks about contemporary Italy in his Autobiography (1935). However, the invasion of Abyssinia proved a dicey matter for Chesterton and his League.

== After Chesterton's death ==
Gilbert Chesterton's death on 14 June 1936 brought changes to the publication. Belloc resumed as editor, as in 1911.

After Chesterton died in 1936 the League was near collapse but continued in a new form, until being closed down in 1940. Arthur Penty's Distributist Manifesto was published in 1937; Belloc had taken over as president, and the vice-presidents included Eric Gill and T. S. Eliot.

== Alleged antisemitic prejudice ==
=== Editorial controversies ===
The Chesterbelloc moniker was coined by George Bernard Shaw for Gilbert Chesterton in partnership with Belloc. The description has stuck, though Shaw additionally remarked that he took issue with how the two were "bracketed together" given that they differed "widely in temperament". The ideological viewpoints advocated in the weekly received a great deal of criticism during the time of publication, leading Gilbert Chesterton to quip that he got "called insane for attempting to return to sanity." Letters to the editor that G. K.'s Weekly ran included commentary from H. G. Wells and Oscar Levy.

There is a continuing debate about the extent of antisemitic prejudice to be found in the views of Gilbert and Cecil Chesterton as well as of Belloc. Complicating matters is that the discussion involves three people who were very different in character, though having largely similar political views, and allegations been put in the frame of guilt by association in the past. Cecil Chesterton was the most combative of the three, and his work is probably the most theoretical as well. Looking at them together acknowledges that the publication's history pieced together does represent a continuity of thought given the many different, distinct writers involved.

Chesterbelloc critics include Barnet Litvinoff, author of The Burning Bush: Antisemitism and World History, who has written:

"Britain had its replicas of Maurras and Daudet in those adornments of English letters, G. K. Chesterton and Hilaire Belloc."

This question has to be examined on a historical trajectory, from the time of the Second Boer War to the Spanish Civil War, via the Marconi scandal. Bryan Cheyette speaks of Chesterton's 'literary decline' from around 1922, and writes

To his detriment, Chesterton's fiction at this time seems to be unduly influenced by Belloc's Barnett quartet with its constant reference to all-powerful Jewish plutocrats [...]

Litvinoff also cites Chesterton commenting on Henry Ford Sr.'s view on the 'Jewish problem', in his 1922 What I Saw in America.

The journalism of Cecil Chesterton for the Eye-Witness at the time of the Marconi scandal, is a substantive though flawed reason why Belloc, Cecil Chesterton and G. K. Chesterton have often been considered an antisemitic clique. This can justly be called guilt by association; which was certainly the precise tactic and fallacy Cecil himself used. One Jewish member of the government, Herbert Samuel, was accused and no evidence was ever shown of his involvement. Godfrey Isaacs sued successfully; he was the brother of the politician Rufus Isaacs, who was cleared by Parliament, but had a case to answer.

=== Hilaire Belloc's views in detail ===
Belloc's views from the Edwardian period, when he was most engaged in political writing, have been discussed by later authors such as in the work Hilaire Belloc: Edwardian Radical by McCarthy. During this period, Belloc's social criticism frequently had in its targets corrupt business practices, what he saw as a ruling plutocracy, the nature of the Second Boer War (seen as economically motivated by Belloc), and the machinations of international finance. Negative fictional characters who are Jewish appear in Belloc's novels from this time, and his writings contain condemnations of industrial capitalism and its dehumanization in which the role of Jews in business and finance is arguably quite emphasized.

Later commentators have argued about the degree in which Belloc's anti-capitalism and anti-communism crosses into antisemitic canards about supposed Jewish involvement in international politics, with his work being both criticized (by figures such as Frederic Raphael) and defended (by figures such as J.B. Morton). Belloc responded to criticisms in his own lifetime, writing in 1924, that he would never support works in which "a Jew has been attacked as a Jew". In terms of Belloc's personal relationships, he apparently held no animus, or little enough animus, that he corresponded with on friendly terms and maintained close connections with numerous Jewish individuals. Several examples exist, an example being his intimate friend and secretary for many years Ruby Goldsmith.

In his specific work The Path to Rome, Belloc describes (at least at that time) finding antisemitism against ordinary laypeople puzzling, if not outright distasteful:

"At the foot of the street was an inn where I entered to eat, and finding there another man—I take him to have been a shopkeeper—I determined to talk politics, and began as follows: 'Have you any anti-Semitism in your town?' 'It is not my town,' he said, 'but there is anti-Semitism. It flourishes.' 'Why then?' I asked. 'How many Jews have you in your town?' He said there were seven.

'But,' said I, 'seven families of Jews—' 'There are not seven families,' he interrupted; 'there are seven Jews all told. There are but two families, and I am reckoning in the children. The servants are Christians.' 'Why,' said I, 'that is only just and proper, that the Jewish families from beyond the frontier should have local Christian people to wait on them and do their bidding. But what I was going to say was that so very few Jews seem to me an insufficient fuel to fire the anti-Semites. How does their opinion flourish?"

'In this way,' he answered. 'The Jews, you see, ridicule our young men for holding such superstitions as the Catholic.' ... I then rose from my meal, saluted him, and went musing up the valley road, pondering upon what it could be that the Jews sacrificed in this remote borough, but I could not for the life of me imagine what it was, though I have had a great many Jews among my friends."

Belloc's later book The Jews, which came out in February 1922, sets out his specific views in detail with his own words. The work has variously been interpreted over the years, with some critics finding it deeply flawed though with good intentions, tinged with antisemitism, while others viewing it as rather fair for its day. Belloc identified a cycle of persecution faced by Jewish families in the various places in which they lived, a kind of self-fulfilling prophecy caused by evolving social views, and he coined the phrase "the tragic cycle of antisemitism". The Jews has been construed both as supporting the case that Belloc had no real prejudices against Jews and as a purported statement by Belloc of the historical view that Jewish integration 'inevitably' causes friction, being insensitive at best.

Belloc specifically wrote,

"It has been a series of cycles invariably following the same steps. The Jew comes to an alien society, at first in small numbers. He thrives. His presence is not resented. He is rather treated as a friend. Whether from mere contrast in type—what I have called "friction"—or from some apparent divergence between his objects and those of his hosts, or through his increasing numbers, he creates (or discovers) a growing animosity. He resents it. He opposes his hosts. They call themselves masters in their own house. The Jew resists their claim. It comes to violence.

It is always the same miserable sequence. First a welcome; then a growing, half-conscious ill-ease; next a culmination in acute ill-ease; lastly catastrophe and disaster; insult, persecution, even massacre, the exiles flying from the place of persecution into a new district where the Jew is hardly known, where the problem has never existed or has been forgotten. He meets again with the largest hospitality. There follows here also, after a period of amicable interfusion, a growing, half-conscious ill-ease, which next becomes acute and leads to new explosions, and so on, in a fatal round."

Belloc also wrote,

"The various nations of Europe have every one of them, in the course of their long histories, passed through successive phases towards the Jew which I have called the tragic cycle. Each has in turn welcomed, tolerated, persecuted, attempted to exile—often actually exiled—welcomed again, and so forth. The two chief examples of extremes in action, are, as I have also pointed out in an earlier part of this book, Spain and England. Spaniards, and in particular the Spaniards of the Kingdom of Castile, went through every phase of this cycle in its fullest form. England passed through even greater extremes, for England was the only country which absolutely got rid of the Jews for hundreds of years, and England is the only country which has, even for a brief period, entered into something like an alliance with them."

On the integration of Jews into British society at the higher levels, he asserted, in the same book,

"[T]hose of the great territorial English families in which there was no Jewish blood were the exception. In nearly all of them was the stain more or less marked, in some of them so strong that though the name was still an English name and the tradition those of a purely English lineage of the long past, the physique and character had become wholly Jewish and the members of the family were taken for Jews whenever they travelled in countries where the gentry had not yet suffered or enjoyed the admixture."

Thus, while highlighting Jewish and non-Jewish conflict and viewing it as common as well as natural, Belloc also portrayed the situation as morally wrong and regrettable, with Jewish citizens of Christian nations being unfairly victimized. His approach took on a largely fatalistic slant distinct from many later analyses of Jewish integration, and he arguably heavily relied on the stereotypes and biases of the period. At the same time, he clearly abhorred seeing violence done to individuals as a result of religion. Defenders such as Joseph Pearce have pointed to comments such as "[t]he Bolshevist Movement was a Jewish movement, but not a movement of the Jewish race" and "the imputation of its evils to the Jews as a whole is a grave injustice" as evidence that Belloc held nuanced opinions alien to the discriminatory antisemites of the time. As well, rabbi David Dalin has commented positively on Belloc's study of how antisemitism comes in cycles, viewing Belloc's ideas as being perceptive.

Critics taking a more negative view of Belloc's attitudes about Jews and Judaism have cited incidents such as when Belloc made the following controversial statements in a conversation with Hugh Kingsmill and Hesketh Pearson:

Belloc: It was the Dreyfus case that opened my eyes to the Jew question. I'm not an anti-Semite. I love 'em, poor dears. Get on very well with them. My best secretary was a Jewess. Poor darlings – it must be terrible to be born with the knowledge that you belong to the enemies of the human race.

Kingsmill: Why do you say the Jews are the enemies of the human race?

Belloc: The Crucifixion.

Author Robert Speaight, however, has cited a private letter by Belloc to one of his Jewish-American friends in the 1920s in which Belloc pilloried conspiracy theorist Nesta Helen Webster for her accusations against "the Jews". Webster had rejected Christianity, studied Eastern religions, accepted the Hindu concept of the equality of all religions and was fascinated by theories of reincarnation and ancestral memory while also making claims about a so-called Illuminati. Belloc expressed his views on Webster's antisemitism very clearly:

"In my opinion it is a lunatic book. She is one of those people who have got one cause on the brain. It is the good old 'Jewish revolutionary' bogey. But there is a type of unstable mind which cannot rest without morbid imaginings, and the conception of a single cause simplifies thought. With this good woman it is the Jews, with some people it is the Jesuits, with others Freemasons and so on. The world is more complex than that."

In the later years of his life, Belloc wrote publicly against the Nazi German regime ruled by Adolf Hitler. He viewed the state as "odious" and particularly condemned Nazi antisemitism. In 1940s The Catholic and the War, Belloc asserted, "The Third Reich has treated its Jewish subjects with a contempt for justice which even if there had been no other action of the kind in other departments would be a sufficient warranty for determining its elimination from Europe".

=== Gilbert Chesterton's views in detail ===
Points often made about Chesterton's attitude to Jews relate to well-known writings, both 'in the small' or casual, and in the large when he seriously addressed the question.

Bernard Levin, a leading British columnist who frequently quoted Chesterton, in The Case for Chesterton brought up some of his light verse, and said "The best one can say of Chesterton's anti-semitism is that it was less vile than Belloc's; let us leave it at that." Joseph Pearce wrote that It is clear that such verses may cause offence, but it is equally clear they were not intended to.

Against Chesterton are also his remarks in The New Jerusalem (1920). Chesterton was, in a real sense, a Zionist. He was not, however, a Zionist without conditions. The following is from the introductory remarks in that book:

"I have felt disposed to say: let all liberal legislation stand, let all literal and legal civic equality stand; let a Jew occupy any political or social position which he can gain in open competition; let us not listen for a moment to any suggestions of reactionary restrictions or racial privilege. Let a Jew be Lord Chief justice, if his exceptional veracity and reliability have clearly marked him out for that post. Let a Jew be Archbishop of Canterbury, if our national religion has attained to that receptive breadth that would render such a transition unobjectionable and even unconscious. But let there be one single-clause bill; one simple and sweeping law about Jews, and no other. Be it enacted, by the King's Most Excellent Majesty, by and with the advice of the Lords Spiritual and Temporal and the Commons in Parliament assembled, that every Jew must be dressed like an Arab. Let him sit on the Woolsack, but let him sit there dressed as an Arab. Let him preach in St. Paul's Cathedral, but let him preach there dressed as an Arab. It is not my point at present to dwell on the pleasing if flippant fancy of how much this would transform the political scene; of the dapper figure of Sir Herbert Samuel swathed as a Bedouin, or Sir Alfred Mond gaining a yet greater grandeur from the gorgeous and trailing robes of the East. If my image is quaint my intention is quite serious; and the point of it is not personal to any particular Jew. The point applies to any Jew, and to our own recovery of healthier relations with him. The point is that we should know where we are; and he would know where he is, which is in a foreign land."

This is seen by some as an unacceptable statement. The point is still contested. It was Chesterton's stated view, having a fondness for the dramatic, that all nations should maintain and return to traditional dress, and enjoyed wearing a classical form of dress himself in the manner of capes and swordsticks. He gave this idea free rein in his first novel The Napoleon of Notting Hill.

In the chapter 'On Zionism', one also finds Chesterton's dim appraisal of the patriotism of Benjamin Disraeli (who had been baptised Anglican at age 13). He argues in effect that the former Prime Minister, due to his Jewish birth, would naturally have abandoned England (a Christian nation) in extremis:

"Patriotism is not merely dying for the nation. It is dying with the nation. It is regarding the fatherland not merely as a real resting-place like an inn, but as a final resting-place, like a house or even a grave. ... Even if we can bring ourselves to believe that Disraeli lived for England, we cannot think that he would have died with her. If England had sunk in the Atlantic he would not have sunk with her, but easily floated over to America to stand for the Presidency. ... When the Jew in France or in England says he is a good patriot he only means that he is a good citizen, and he would put it more truly if he said he was a good exile. Sometimes indeed he is an abominably bad citizen, and a most exasperating and execrable exile, but I am not talking of that side of the case. I am assuming that a man like Disraeli did really make a romance of England, [as did Dernburg Germany], and it is still true that though it was a romance, they would not have allowed it to be a tragedy. They would have seen that the story had a happy ending, especially for themselves. These Jews would not have died with any Christian nation."

Further discussion comes from comments about Jews being responsible for both the USSR's communism and the US's unbridled capitalism (1929). John Gross in The Rise and Fall of the Man of Letters (1969) commented:

"Chesterton's hatred of capitalism and his dread of the monolithic state were the generous responses of a man who saw the sickness of his society far more clearly than the ordinary Liberal and felt it far more deeply than the self-confident Fabian social engineers. Unfortunately, though, a sense of outrage often proved as bad a counsellor in his case as it had done in Carlyle's. His diatribes against usury and corruption were those of a man on the edge of hysteria; his anti-semitism was an illness. Despite this, his fundamental decency is never obscured for long. He hated oppression; he belonged to the world before totalitarianism. But the positive side of his politics – Distributism, peasant smallholdings, Merrie Englandism – led him into a hopeless cul-de-sac."

Chesterton, however, opposed all forms of persecution of Jews and all violent antisemitism. In 1934, after the Nazi Party took power in Germany he wrote that:

In our early days Hilaire Belloc and myself were accused of being uncompromising Anti-Semites. Today, although I still think there is a Jewish problem, I am appalled by the Hitlerite atrocities. They have absolutely no reason or logic behind them. It is quite obviously the expedient of a man who has been driven to seeking a scapegoat, and has found with relief the most famous scapegoat in European history, the Jewish people.
