= Dale Ahlquist =

American author (born 1958)

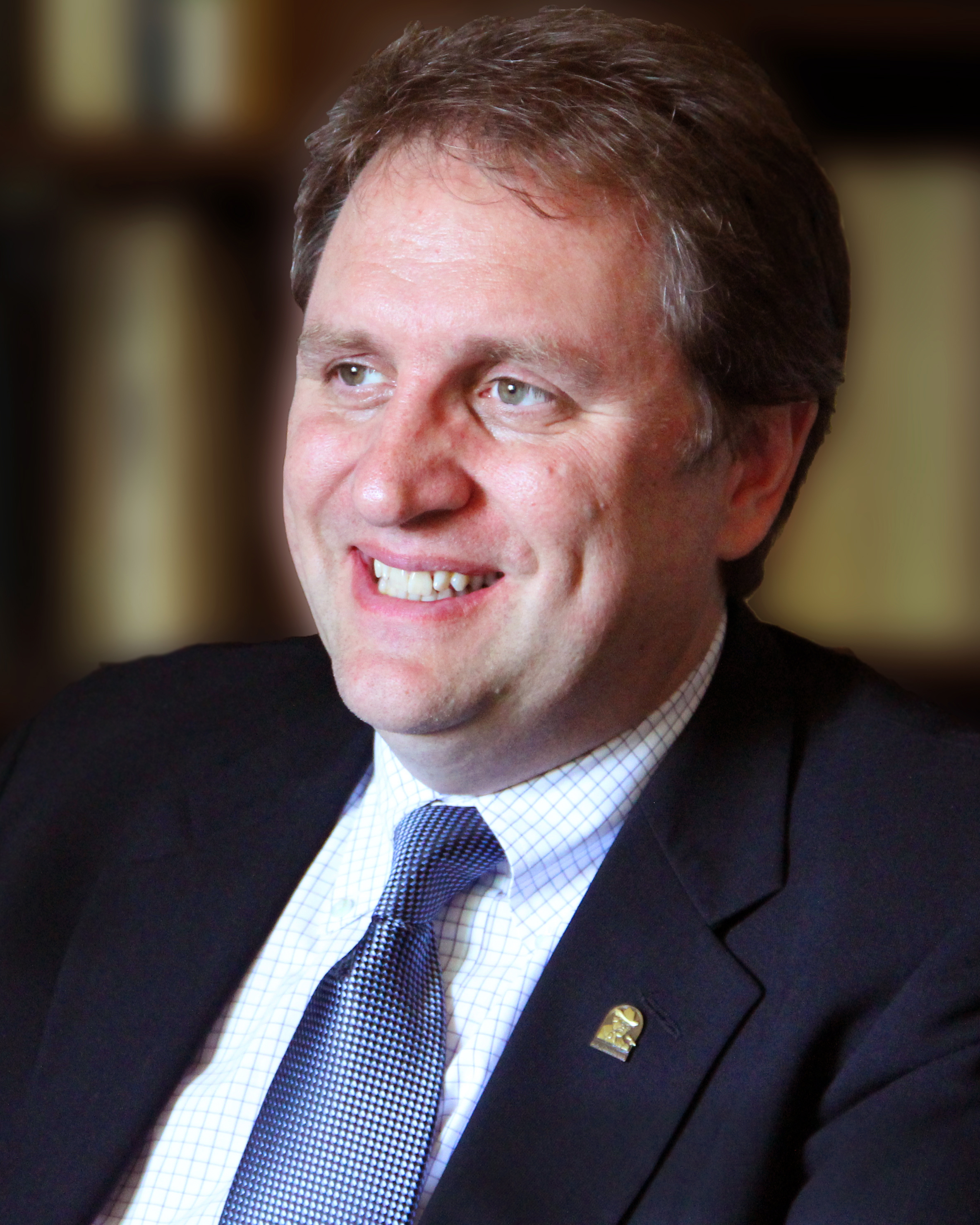
- Ahlquist in May 2012
- Born: June 14, 1958 (age 68); St. Paul, Minnesota, U.S.
- Occupation: Author

Dale Ahlquist (born June 14, 1958) is an American author and advocate of the thought of G. K. Chesterton. Ahlquist is the president and a co-founder of the American Chesterton Society and the publisher of its magazine, Gilbert. He is also a co-founder of Chesterton Academy, a Catholic high school in Minneapolis.

== Biography ==
Dale Ahlquist was born in St. Paul, Minnesota to a Baptist household on June 14, 1958. Ahlquist received his B.A. from Carleton College in Northfield, Minnesota, and a M.A. from Hamline University in St. Paul, Minnesota. Ahlquist received an honorary doctorate from the University of Mary in 2024.

After reading G. K. Chesterton’s The Everlasting Man during his honeymoon in Rome Ahlquist studied the Early Church Fathers and the history of the Catholic Church. He subsequently was convinced of the Catholic view of the papacy, the sacraments of the Catholic Church, and the Virgin Mary. In 1996, he founded the American Chesterton Society. He converted to Catholicism in 1997, along with his two oldest children Julian and Ashley. His wife, Laura, who had not been a practicing Catholic when they met, also returned to the Church.

In 2000, Ahlquist quit his job as a political lobbyist to run the American Chesterton Society full-time, which is a non-profit organization co-founded by Dale Ahlquist in 1996 with the mission of promoting interest in English author, G. K. Chesterton. In 2008, Dale Ahlquist and Tom Bengtson founded the Chesterton Academy, a high school in Hopkins, Minnesota, based on G. K. Chesterton’s ideas of integrated learning. Ahlquist has contributed as a writer to The Paradox Press.
