= G. K. Chesterton =

English author and Christian apologist (1874–1936)

G. K. Chesterton KC*SG
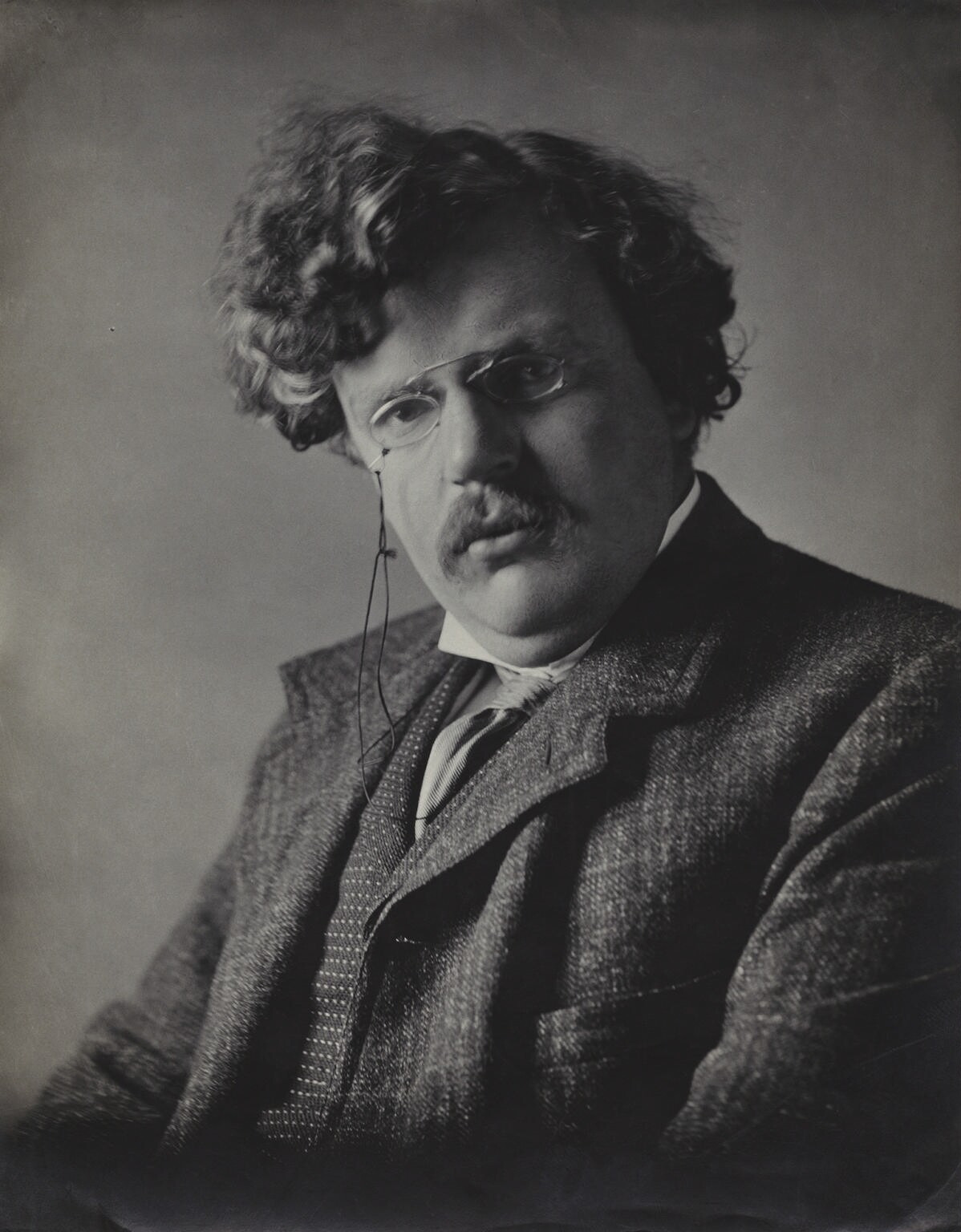
- Chesterton in 1909
- Born: Gilbert Keith Chesterton; 29 May 1874; Kensington, London, England
- Died: 14 June 1936 (aged 62); Beaconsfield, Buckinghamshire, England
- Resting place: Roman Catholic Cemetery, Beaconsfield
- Education: University College London
- Occupations: Journalist; novelist; essayist; poet
- Spouse: Frances Blogg (m. 1901)
- Relatives: Cecil Chesterton (brother); A. K. Chesterton (first cousin, once removed)
- Writing career
- Period: 1900–1936
- Genres: Essays, fantasy, Christian apologetics, Catholic apologetics, mystery, poetry
- Notable works: The Napoleon of Notting Hill; The Man Who Was Thursday; Orthodoxy; Father Brown stories; The Everlasting Man
- Movement: Catholic literary revival

Gilbert Keith Chesterton (29 May 1874 – 14 June 1936) was an English journalist, novelist, essayist, poet, and Christian apologist. Chesterton's wit, paradoxical style, and defence of tradition made him a dominant figure in early 20th-century literature.

Chesterton created the fictional priest-detective Father Brown and wrote on apologetics in works such as Orthodoxy and The Everlasting Man. Chesterton routinely referred to himself as an orthodox Christian and came to identify this position more and more with Catholicism, eventually converting from Anglicanism. Biographers have identified him as a successor to such Victorian authors as Matthew Arnold, Thomas Carlyle, John Henry Newman and John Ruskin.

Chesterton has been referred to as the "prince of paradox". Of his writing style, Time magazine observed: "Whenever possible, Chesterton made his points with popular sayings, proverbs, allegories—first carefully turning them inside out." His writings were an influence on Jorge Luis Borges, who compared Chesterton's work with that of Edgar Allan Poe.

== Biography ==
=== Early life ===
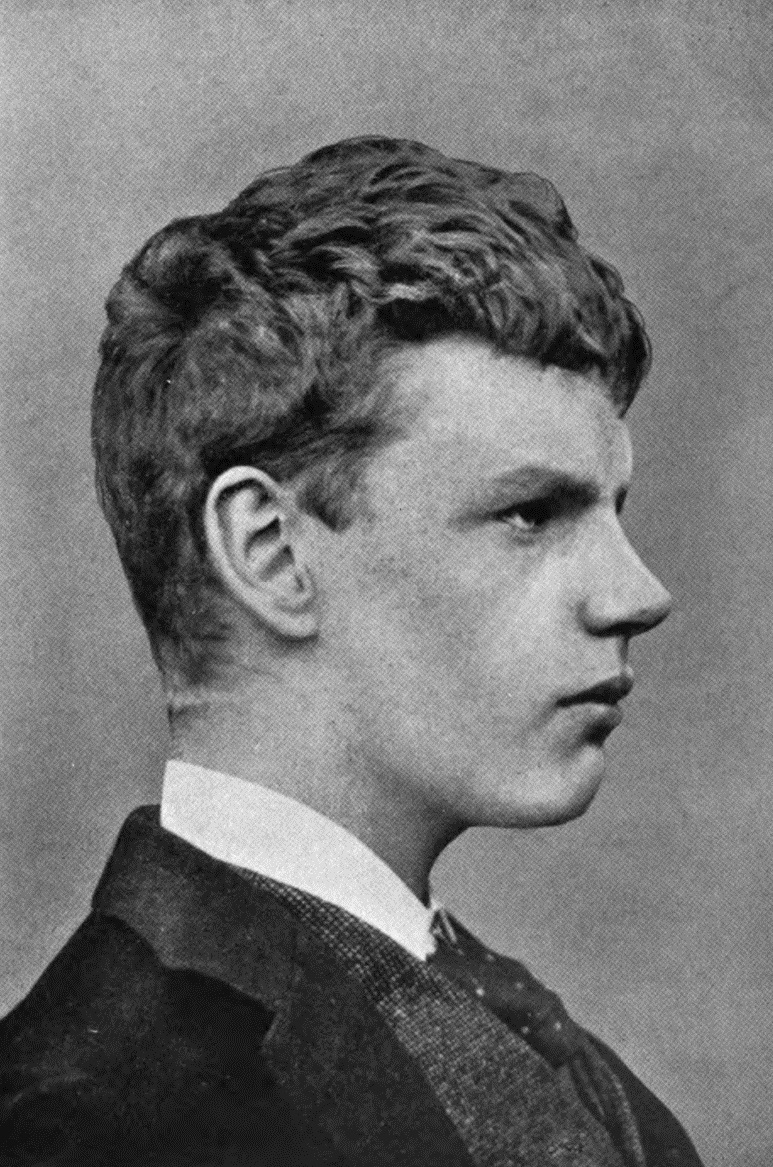
Chesterton at age 17

Chesterton was born in Campden Hill in Kensington, London, on 29 May 1874. His father was Edward Chesterton, an estate agent, and his mother was Marie Louise, née Grosjean, of Swiss-French origin. Chesterton was baptised at the age of one month into the Church of England, though his family were irregularly practising Unitarians. According to his autobiography, as a young man he became fascinated with the occult and, along with his brother Cecil, experimented with Ouija boards. In Orthodoxy, Chesterton stated that he was a pagan when he was twelve and, by the time he was sixteen, he was completely agnostic. He was educated at St Paul's School, then attended the Slade School of Art to become an illustrator. The Slade is a department of University College London, where Chesterton also took classes in literature, but he did not complete a degree in either subject. He married Frances Blogg in 1901; the marriage lasted the rest of his life. Chesterton credited Frances with leading him back to Anglicanism, though he later considered Anglicanism to be a "pale imitation". He entered in full communion with the Catholic Church in 1922. The couple were unable to have children.

A friend from schooldays was Edmund Clerihew Bentley, inventor of the clerihew, a whimsical four-line biographical poem. Chesterton wrote clerihews and illustrated his friend's first published collection of poetry, Biography for Beginners (1905), which popularised the clerihew form. He opened his novel The Man Who Was Thursday with a poem written to Bentley. He also became godfather to Bentley's son Nicolas.

=== Career ===
In September 1895, Chesterton began working for the London publisher George Redway, where he remained for just over a year. In October 1896, he moved to the publishing house T. Fisher Unwin, where he remained until 1902. During this period he undertook his first journalistic work as a freelance art and literary critic. In 1902, The Daily News gave him a weekly opinion column, followed in 1905 by a weekly column in The Illustrated London News, for which he continued to write for the next 30 years.

Early on Chesterton showed a great interest in and talent for art. He had planned to become an artist, and his writing shows a vision that clothed abstract ideas in concrete and memorable images. Father Brown is perpetually correcting the incorrect vision of the bewildered folk at the scene of the crime and wandering off at the end with the criminal to exercise his priestly role of recognition, repentance and reconciliation. For example, in the story "The Flying Stars", Father Brown entreats the character Flambeau to give up his life of crime: "There is still youth and honour and humour in you; don't fancy they will last in that trade. Men may keep a sort of level of good, but no man has ever been able to keep on one level of evil. That road goes down and down. The kind man drinks and turns cruel; the frank man kills and lies about it. Many a man I've known started like you to be an honest outlaw, a merry robber of the rich, and ended stamped into slime."

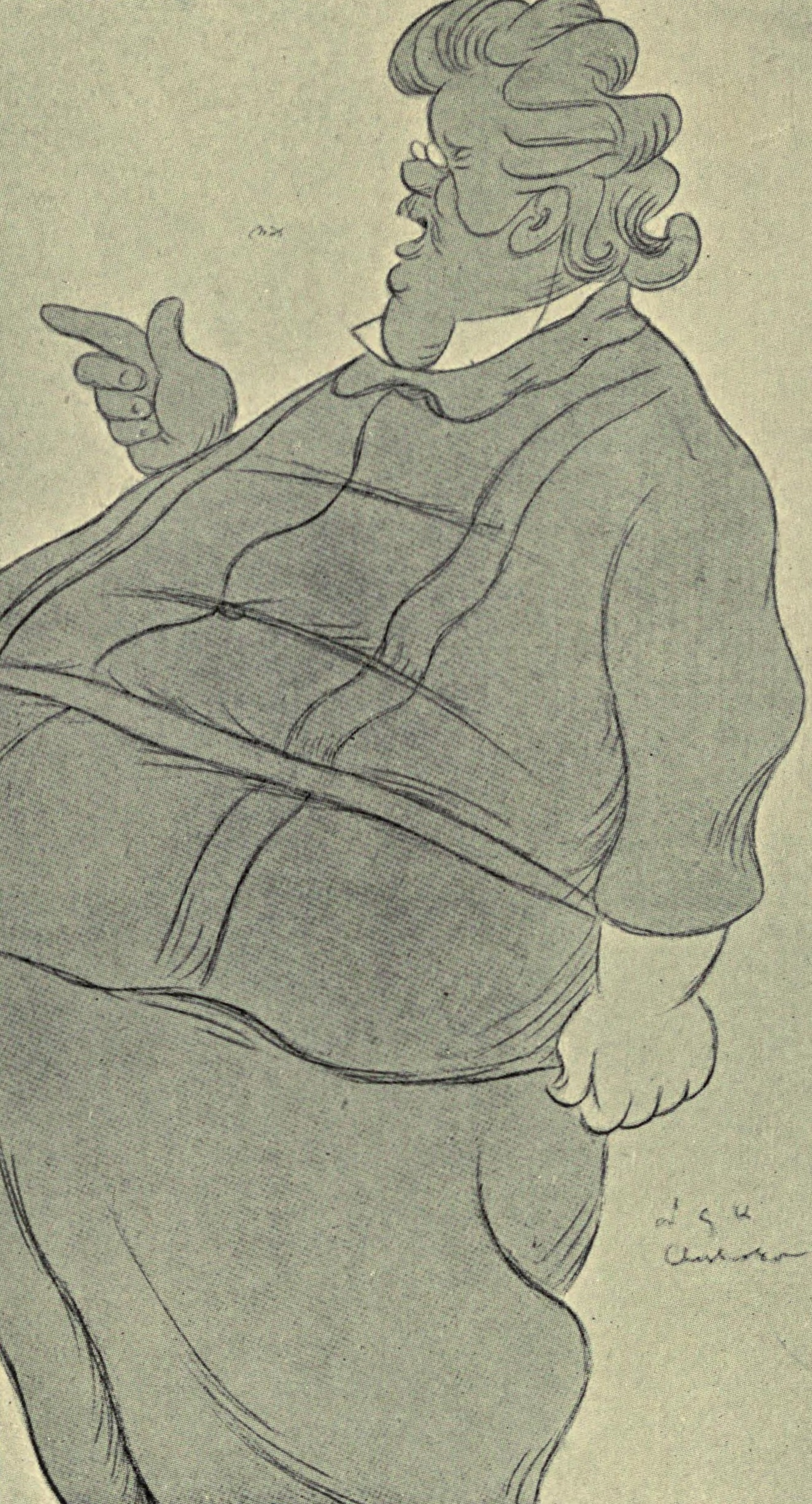
Caricature by Max Beerbohm

Chesterton loved to debate, often engaging in friendly public disputes with such men as George Bernard Shaw, H. G. Wells, Bertrand Russell and Clarence Darrow. According to his autobiography, he and Shaw played cowboys in a silent film that was never released. On 7 January 1914 Chesterton (along with his brother Cecil and future sister-in-law Ada) took part in the mock-trial of John Jasper for the murder of Edwin Drood. Chesterton was Judge, and Shaw played the role of foreman of the jury. That autumn, Chesterton was struck with a serious illness from which he barely recovered, bedridden for months and unconscious for a significant portion of it.

During the First World War, Chesterton was editing New Witness writing editorials and publishing letters from writers and thinkers, such as Thomas Maynard— English poet and historian of the Catholic Church whose thinking was influenced by Chesterton's (1908) Orthodoxy—and Hilaire Belloc. In 1917, issues of New Witness shed light on these writers' moral concerns about the way the war was being fought on the home front, by commentary on "the 'Gordon Scandal'", the undercover agent alias "Alex Gordon". This scandal was the refusal of the Attorney-General F. E. Smith to produce 'Gordon', the 'vanishing spy', for examination in court but on whose 'evidence' three defendants to conspiracy to murder (David Lloyd George and Arthur Henderson) were convicted and imprisoned (R v Alice Wheeldon & Ors, 1917).

Chesterton was a large man, standing 6 feet 4 inches (1.93 m) tall and weighing around 20 stone 6 pounds (130 kg; 286 lb). His girth gave rise to an anecdote during the First World War, when a lady in London asked why he was not "out at the Front"; he replied, "If you go round to the side, you will see that I am." On another occasion he remarked to Shaw, "To look at you, anyone would think a famine had struck England." Shaw retorted, "To look at you, anyone would think you had caused it." P. G. Wodehouse once described a very loud crash as "a sound like G. K. Chesterton falling onto a sheet of tin". Chesterton usually wore a cape and a crumpled hat, with a swordstick in hand and a cigar hanging out of his mouth. He had a tendency to forget where he was supposed to be going and miss the train that was supposed to take him there. It is reported that on several occasions he sent a telegram to his wife Frances from an incorrect location, writing such things as "Am in Market Harborough. Where ought I to be?" to which she would reply, "Home". Chesterton told this story but omitting his wife's alleged reply, in his autobiography.

In 1931, the BBC invited Chesterton to give a series of radio talks. He accepted, tentatively at first. He was allowed (and encouraged) to improvise on the scripts. This allowed his talks to maintain an intimate character, as did the decision to allow his wife and secretary to sit with him during his broadcasts. The talks were very popular. A BBC official remarked, after Chesterton's death, that "in another year or so, he would have become the dominating voice from Broadcasting House." Chesterton was nominated for the Nobel Prize in Literature in 1935.

Chesterton was part of the Detection Club, a society of British mystery authors founded by Anthony Berkeley in 1928. He was elected as the first president and served from 1930 to 1936 until he was succeeded by E. C. Bentley. Chesterton was one of the dominating figures of the London literary scene in the early 20th century.

=== Death ===
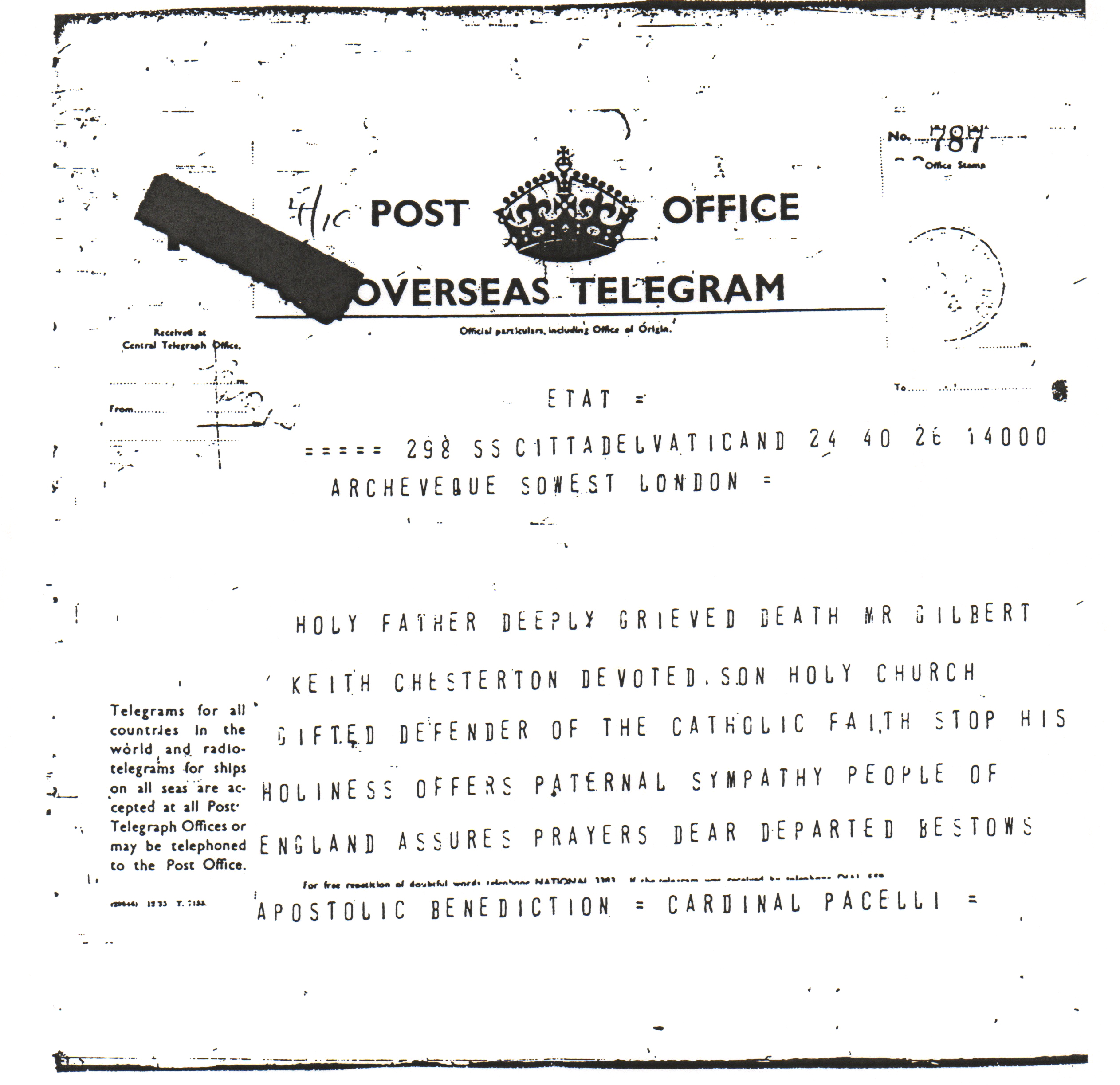
Telegram sent by Cardinal Eugenio Pacelli (the future Pius XII) on behalf of Pope Pius XI to the people of England following the death of Chesterton

Chesterton died of congestive heart failure on 14 June 1936, 16 days after his 62nd birthday, at his home in Beaconsfield, Buckinghamshire. His last words were a greeting of good morning spoken to his wife, Frances. The sermon at Chesterton's Requiem Mass in Westminster Cathedral, London, was delivered by Ronald Knox on 27 June 1936. Knox said, "All of this generation has grown up under Chesterton's influence so completely that we do not even know when we are thinking Chesterton." He is buried in Beaconsfield in the Catholic Cemetery. Chesterton's estate was probated at £28,389, equivalent to £1,734,716 in 2025.

Near the end of Chesterton's life, Pope Pius XI invested him as Knight Commander with Star of the Papal Order of St. Gregory the Great (KC*SG). The Chesterton Society has proposed that he be beatified.

== Writing ==
Chesterton wrote around 80 books, several hundred poems, some 200 short stories, 4,000 essays (mostly newspaper columns), and several plays. He was a literary and social critic, historian, playwright, novelist, and Catholic theologian and apologist, debater, and mystery writer. He was a columnist for the Daily News, The Illustrated London News, and his own paper, G. K.'s Weekly; he also wrote articles for the Encyclopædia Britannica, including the entry on Charles Dickens and part of the entry on Humour in the 14th edition (1929). His best-known character is the priest-detective Father Brown, who appears only in short stories, while The Man Who Was Thursday is arguably his best-known novel. He was a convinced Christian long before he was received into the Catholic Church, and Christian themes and symbolism appear in much of his writing. In the United States, his writings on distributism were popularised through The American Review, published by Seward Collins in New York. Chesterton's writings consistently displayed wit and a sense of humour. He employed paradox, while making serious comments on the world, government, politics, economics, philosophy, theology and many other topics.

Of his nonfiction, Charles Dickens: A Critical Study (1906) has received some of the broadest-based praise. According to Ian Ker (The Catholic Revival in English Literature, 1845–1961, 2003), "In Chesterton's eyes Dickens belongs to Merry, not Puritan, England"; Ker treats Chesterton's thought in chapter 4 of that book as largely growing out of his true appreciation of Dickens, a somewhat shop-soiled property in the view of other literary opinions of the time. The biography was largely responsible for creating a popular revival for Dickens's work as well as a serious reconsideration of Dickens by scholars.

T. S. Eliot sums up his work as follows:

He was importantly and consistently on the side of the angels. Behind the Johnsonian fancy dress, so reassuring to the British public, he concealed the most serious and revolutionary designs—concealing them by exposure ... Chesterton's social and economic ideas ... were fundamentally Christian and Catholic. He did more, I think, than any man of his time—and was able to do more than anyone else, because of his particular background, development and abilities as a public performer—to maintain the existence of the important minority in the modern world. He leaves behind a permanent claim upon our loyalty, to see that the work that he did in his time is continued in ours.

Eliot comments further: "His poetry was first-rate journalistic balladry, and I do not suppose that he took it more seriously than it deserved. He reached a high imaginative level with The Napoleon of Notting Hill, and higher with The Man Who Was Thursday, romances in which he turned the Stevensonian fantasy to more serious purpose. His book on Dickens seems to me the best essay on that author that has ever been written. Some of his essays can be read again and again; though of his essay-writing as a whole, one can only say that it is remarkable to have maintained such a high average with so large an output."

In 2022, a three-volume bibliography of Chesterton was published, listing 9,000 contributions he made to newspapers, magazines, and journals, as well as 200 books and 3,000 articles about him.

== Contemporaries ==
=== "Chesterbelloc" ===
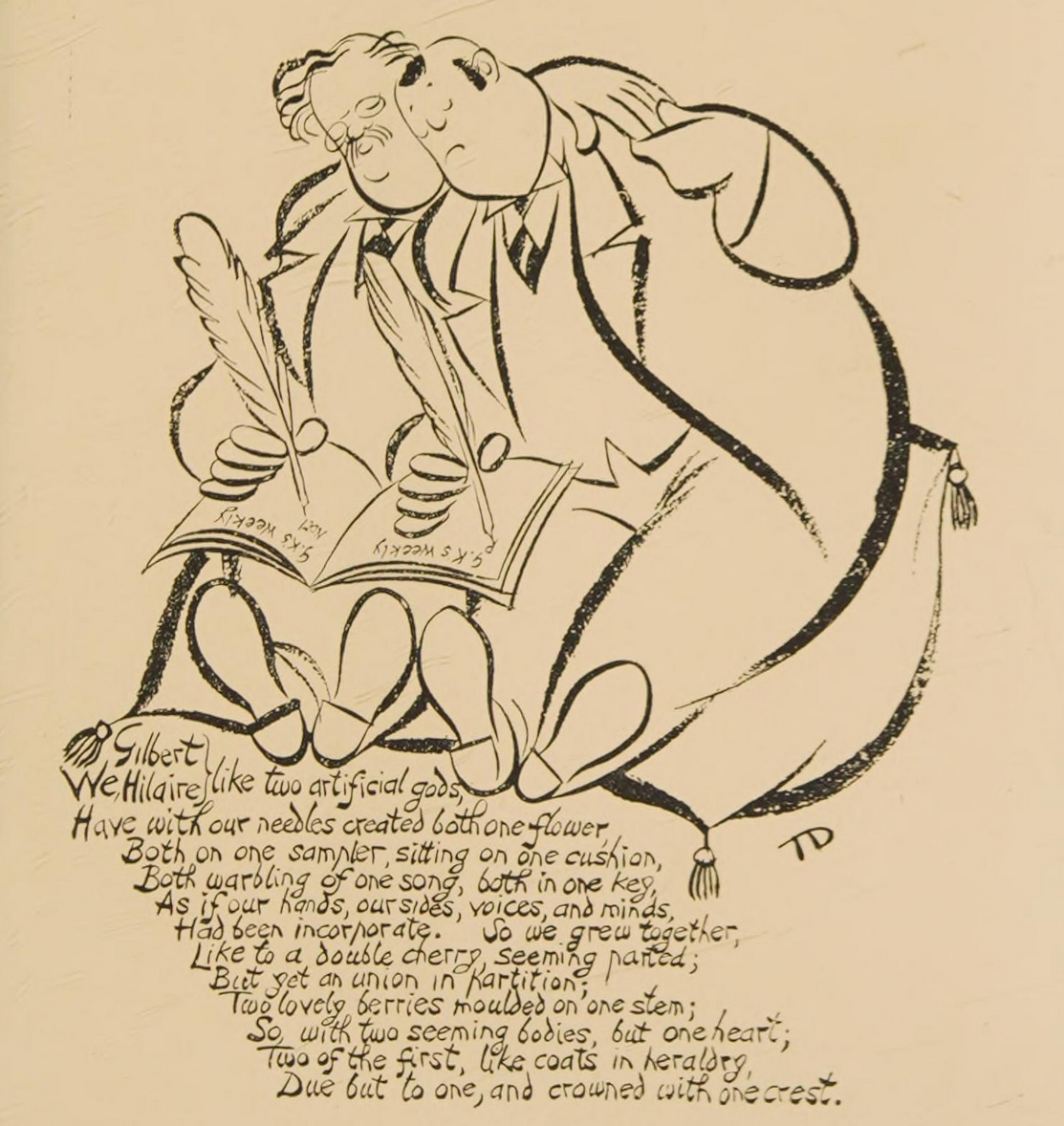
A caricature Chesterton (left) and Belloc with a poem about their unity and inseparability (Thomas Derrick, c. 1935)

Chesterton is often associated with his close friend, poet and essayist Hilaire Belloc. George Bernard Shaw coined the name "Chesterbelloc" for their partnership, and this stuck. Though they were very different men, they shared many beliefs; in 1922, Chesterton joined Belloc in the Catholic faith, and both voiced criticisms of capitalism and socialism. They instead espoused a third way: distributism. G. K.'s Weekly, which occupied much of Chesterton's energy in the last 15 years of his life, was the successor to Belloc's New Witness, taken over from Cecil Chesterton, who died in World War I.

In his book On the Place of Gilbert Chesterton in English Letters, Belloc wrote that "Everything he wrote upon any one of the great English literary names was of the first quality. He summed up any one pen (that of Jane Austen, for instance) in exact sentences; sometimes in a single sentence, after a fashion which no one else has approached. He stood quite by himself in this department. He understood the very minds (to take the two most famous names) of Thackeray and of Dickens. He understood and presented Meredith. He understood the supremacy in Milton. He understood Pope. He understood the great Dryden. He was not swamped as nearly all his contemporaries were by Shakespeare, wherein they drown as in a vast sea – for that is what Shakespeare is. Gilbert Chesterton continued to understand the youngest and latest comers as he understood the forefathers in our great corpus of English verse and prose."

=== George Bernard Shaw ===
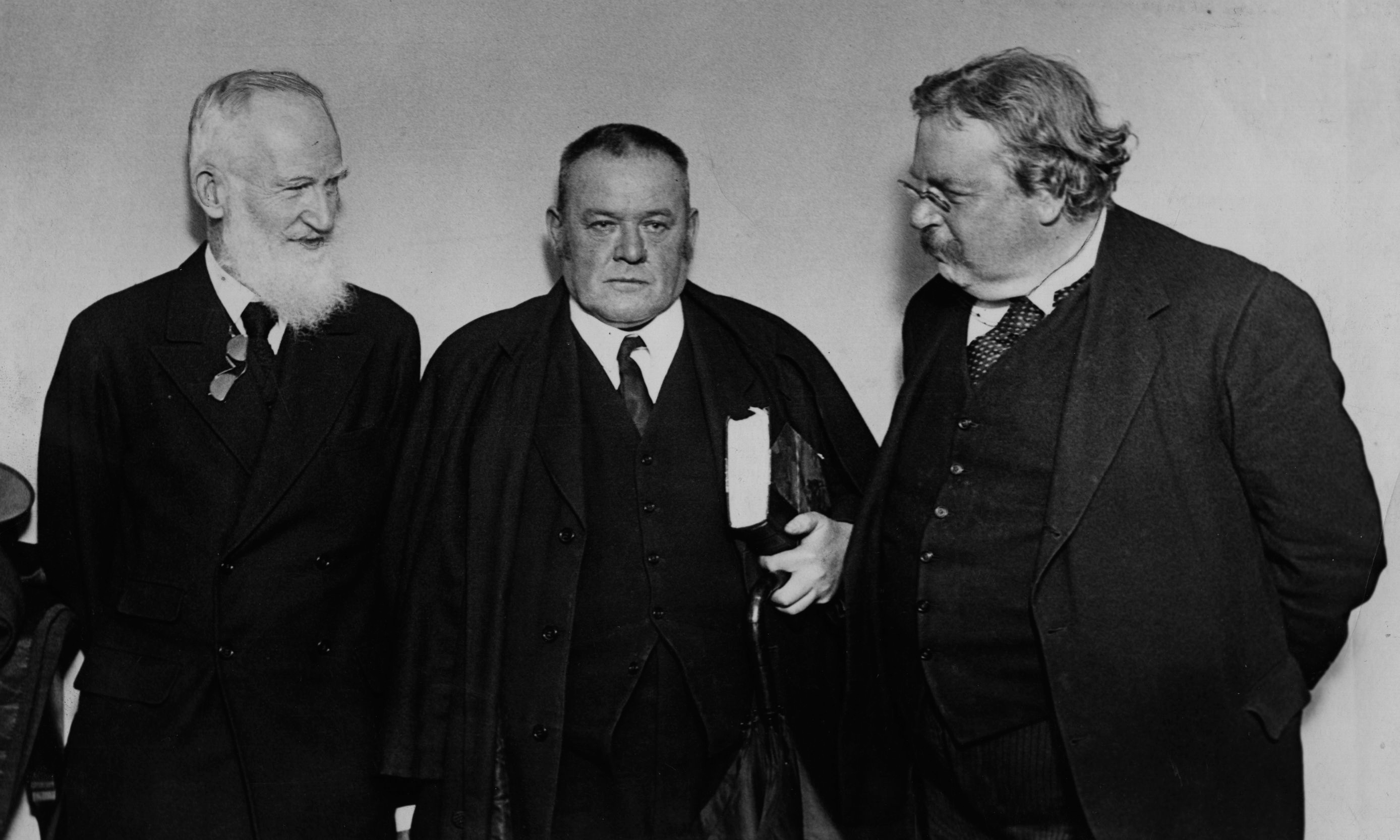
Chesterton (right) with Hilaire Belloc (centre) and George Bernard Shaw (left)

Chesterton and George Bernard Shaw were famous friends and enjoyed their arguments and discussions. Although rarely in agreement, they each maintained good will toward, and respect for, the other. In his writing, Chesterton expressed himself very plainly on where they differed and why. In Heretics he writes of Shaw:

After belabouring a great many people for a great many years for being unprogressive, Mr Shaw has discovered, with characteristic sense, that it is very doubtful whether any existing human being with two legs can be progressive at all. Having come to doubt whether humanity can be combined with progress, most people, easily pleased, would have elected to abandon progress and remain with humanity. Mr Shaw, not being easily pleased, decides to throw over humanity with all its limitations and go in for progress for its own sake. If man, as we know him, is incapable of the philosophy of progress, Mr Shaw asks, not for a new kind of philosophy, but for a new kind of man. It is rather as if a nurse had tried a rather bitter food for some years on a baby, and on discovering that it was not suitable, should not throw away the food and ask for a new food, but throw the baby out of window, and ask for a new baby.

== Views ==
=== Advocacy of Catholicism ===
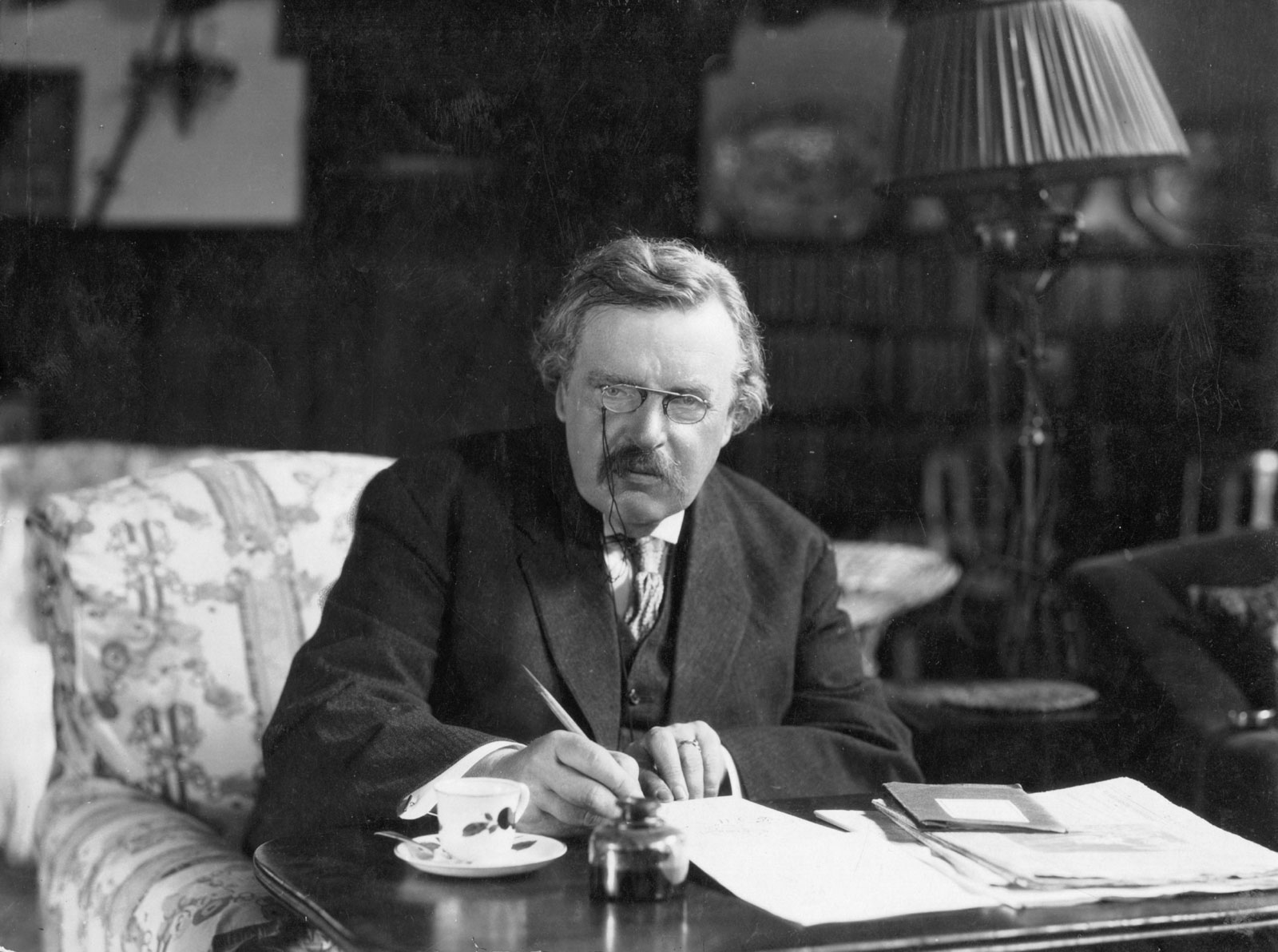
Chesterton in his office

Chesterton's views, in contrast to Shaw and others, became increasingly focused towards the Church. In Orthodoxy he writes: "The worship of will is the negation of will ... If Mr Bernard Shaw comes up to me and says, 'Will something', that is tantamount to saying, 'I do not mind what you will', and that is tantamount to saying, 'I have no will in the matter.' You cannot admire will in general, because the essence of will is that it is particular."

Chesterton's The Everlasting Man contributed to C. S. Lewis's conversion to Christianity. In a letter to Sheldon Vanauken (14 December 1950), Lewis calls the book "the best popular apologetic I know", and to Rhonda Bodle he wrote (31 December 1947) "the [very] best popular defence of the full Christian position I know is G. K. Chesterton's The Everlasting Man". The book was cited in a list of 10 books that "most shaped his vocational attitude and philosophy of life".

Chesterton's hymn "O God of Earth and Altar" was printed in The Commonwealth and was included in The English Hymnal in 1906. Several lines of the hymn appear in the beginning of the song "Revelations" by the British heavy metal band Iron Maiden on their 1983 album Piece of Mind. Lead singer Bruce Dickinson in an interview stated "I have a fondness for hymns. I love some of the ritual, the beautiful words, Jerusalem and there was another one, with words by G. K. Chesterton O God of Earth and Altar – very fire and brimstone: 'Bow down and hear our cry'. I used that for an Iron Maiden song, "Revelations". In my strange and clumsy way I was trying to say look it's all the same stuff."

French philosopher Étienne Gilson praised Chesterton's book on Thomas Aquinas: "I consider it as being, without possible comparison, the best book ever written on Saint Thomas ... the few readers who have spent twenty or thirty years in studying St. Thomas Aquinas, and who, perhaps, have themselves published two or three volumes on the subject, cannot fail to perceive that the so-called 'wit' of Chesterton has put their scholarship to shame."

Archbishop Fulton J. Sheen, the author of 70 books, identified Chesterton as the stylist who had the greatest impact on his own writing, stating in his autobiography Treasure in Clay, "the greatest influence in writing was G. K. Chesterton who never used a useless word, who saw the value of a paradox, and avoided what was trite." Chesterton wrote the introduction to Sheen's book God and Intelligence in Modern Philosophy; A Critical Study in the Light of the Philosophy of Saint Thomas.

=== Common sense ===
Chesterton has been called "The Apostle of Common Sense". He was critical of the thinkers and popular philosophers of the day, who though very clever, were saying things that he considered nonsensical. This is illustrated again in Orthodoxy: "Thus when Mr H. G. Wells says (as he did somewhere), 'All chairs are quite different', he utters not merely a misstatement, but a contradiction in terms. If all chairs were quite different, you could not call them 'all chairs'."

=== Conservatism ===
Although Chesterton was an early member of the Fabian Society, he resigned at the time of the Second Boer War. He is often identified as a traditionalist conservative due to his staunch support of tradition, expressed in Orthodoxy and other works with Burkean quotes such as the following:

Tradition means giving votes to the most obscure of all classes, our ancestors. It is the democracy of the dead. Tradition refuses to submit to the small and arrogant oligarchy of those who merely happen to be walking about. All democrats object to men being disqualified by the accident of birth; tradition objects to their being disqualified by the accident of death. Democracy tells us not to neglect a good man's opinion, even if he is our groom; tradition asks us not to neglect a good man's opinion, even if he is our father.

Chesterton has been considered among the United Kingdom's anti-imperialist conservative wing, contrasted with his intellectual rivals in Shaw and Wells. Chesterton's association with conservatism has expanded beyond British politics; Japanese conservative intellectuals, such as Hidetsugu Yagi, have often referred to Chesterton's appeal to tradition as the "democracy of the dead". However, Chesterton did not equate conservatism with complacency, arguing that cultural conservatives had to be politically radical.

=== Liberalism ===
In spite of his association with tradition and conservatism, Chesterton called himself "the last liberal". He was a supporter of the Liberal Party until he severed ties in 1928 following the death of former Liberal Prime Minister H. H. Asquith, although his attachment had already gradually weakened over the decades. In addition the Daily News, for which Chesterton had been a columnist between 1903 and 1913, was aligned with the Liberals.

Chesterton's increasing coolness towards the Liberal Party was a response to the rise of New Liberalism in the early 20th century, which differed from his own vision of liberalism in several respects: it was secular, rather than being rooted in Christianity like the party's previously predominant creed of Gladstonian liberalism, and advocated a collectivist approach to social reform at odds with Chesterton's concern about what he saw as an increasingly interventionist and technocratic state challenging both the primacy of the family in social organisation and democracy as a political ideal.

Despite this critique of the development of left-liberalism in this period, Chesterton also criticised the laissez-faire approach of Manchester Liberalism which had been influential among Liberals in the late 19th century, arguing that this had led to the development of monopolies and plutocracy rather than the competition classical theorists had predicted, as well as the exploitation of workers for profit.

In addition to Chesterton, other distributists including Belloc were also involved with the Liberals before the First World War. They shared much common ground in terms of their policy agenda with the broader party during this time, including devolution of power to local government, franchise reform, replication of the Irish Wyndham Land Act in Britain, supporting trade unions and a degree of social reform by central government, whilst opposing socialism.

Chesterton opposed the Conservative Education Act 1902, which provided for public funding of Church schools, on the grounds that religious freedom was best served by keeping religion out of education. However, he disassociated himself from the campaign against it led by John Clifford, whose invoking of the Act's provisions as resulting in "Rome on the rates" was judged by Chesterton to be bigotry appealing to straw man arguments. The Chestertons and Belloc supported the Liberal leadership on the passage of David Lloyd George's People's Budget and the weakening of the power of the House of Lords through the Parliament Act 1911 in response to its resistance to the budget, but were critical of their timidity in pushing for Irish Home Rule.

Following the war, the position of the New Liberals had strengthened, and the distributists came to believe that the party's positions were closer to social democracy than liberalism. They also differed from most Liberals by advocating for home rule for all of Ireland, rather than partition. More generally they developed a policy agenda distinct from any of the main three parties during this time, including promoting craft guilds and the nuclear family, introducing primary elections and referendums, antitrust action, tax reform to favour small businesses, and transparency regarding party funding and the Honours Lists.

=== On war ===
Chesterton first emerged as a journalist just after the turn of the 20th century. His great, and very lonely, opposition to the Second Boer War, set him very much apart from most of the rest of the British press. Chesterton was a Little Englander, opposed to imperialism, British or otherwise. Chesterton thought that Great Britain betrayed its own principles in the Boer Wars.

In vivid contrast to his opposition to the Boer Wars, Chesterton vigorously defended and encouraged the Allies in World War I. "The war was in Chesterton's eyes a crusade, and he was certain that England was right to fight as she had been wrong in fighting the Boers." Chesterton saw the roots of the war in Prussian militarism. He was deeply disturbed by Prussia's unprovoked invasion and occupation of neutral Belgium and by reports of shocking atrocities the Imperial German Army was allegedly committing in Belgium. Over the course of the War, Chesterton wrote hundreds of essays defending it, attacking pacifism, and exhorting the public to persevere until victory. Some of these essays were collected in the 1916 work, The Barbarism of Berlin.

One of Chesterton's most successful works in support of the War was his 1915 tongue-in-cheek The Crimes of England. The work is ironic, supposedly apologizing and trying to help a fictitious Prussian professor named Whirlwind make the case for Prussia in WWI, while actually attacking Prussia throughout. Part of the book's humorous impact is the conceit that Professor Whirlwind never realizes how his supposed benefactor is undermining Prussia at every turn. Chesterton "blames" England for historically building up Prussia against Austria, and for its pacifism, especially among wealthy British Quaker political donors, who prevented Britain from standing up to past Prussian aggression.

=== Jews ===
Chesterton faced accusations of antisemitism during his lifetime, saying in his 1920 book The New Jerusalem that it was something "for which my friends and I were for a long period rebuked and even reviled". Despite his protestations to the contrary, the accusation continues to be repeated. An early supporter of Captain Dreyfus, by 1906 he had turned into an anti-Dreyfusard. From the early 20th century, his fictional work included caricatures of Jews, stereotyping them as greedy, cowardly, disloyal and communists. Martin Gardner suggests that Four Faultless Felons was allowed to go out of print in the United States because of the "anti-Semitism which mars so many pages."

The Marconi scandal of 1912–1913 brought issues of antisemitism into the political mainstream. Senior ministers in the Liberal government had secretly profited from advance knowledge of deals regarding wireless telegraphy, and critics regarded it as relevant that some of the key players were Jewish. According to historian Todd Endelman, who identified Chesterton as among the most vocal critics, "The Jew-baiting at the time of the Boer War and the Marconi scandal was linked to a broader protest, mounted in the main by the Radical wing of the Liberal Party, against the growing visibility of successful businessmen in national life and their challenge to what were seen as traditional English values."

In a 1917 work, entitled A Short History of England, Chesterton considers the royal decree of 1290 by which Edward I expelled Jews from England, a policy that remained in place until 1655. Chesterton writes that popular perception of Jewish moneylenders could well have led Edward I's subjects to regard him as a "tender father of his people" for "breaking the rule by which the rulers had hitherto fostered their bankers' wealth". He felt that Jews, "a sensitive and highly civilized people" who "were the capitalists of the age, the men with wealth banked ready for use", might legitimately complain that "Christian kings and nobles, and even Christian popes and bishops, used for Christian purposes (such as the Crusades and the cathedrals) the money that could only be accumulated in such mountains by a usury they inconsistently denounced as unchristian; and then, when worse times came, gave up the Jew to the fury of the poor".

In The New Jerusalem, Chesterton dedicated a chapter to his views on the Jewish question: the sense that Jews were a distinct people without a homeland of their own, living as foreigners in countries where they were always a minority. He wrote that in the past, his position:

was always called Anti-Semitism; but it was always much more true to call it Zionism. ... my friends and I had in some general sense a policy in the matter; and it was in substance the desire to give Jews the dignity and status of a separate nation. We desired that in some fashion, and so far as possible, Jews should be represented by Jews, should live in a society of Jews, should be judged by Jews and ruled by Jews. I am an Anti-Semite if that is Anti-Semitism. It would seem more rational to call it Semitism.

In the same place he proposed the thought experiment (describing it as "a parable" and "a flippant fancy") that Jews should be admitted to any role in English public life on condition that they must wear distinctively Middle Eastern garb, explaining that "The point is that we should know where we are; and he would know where he is, which is in a foreign land."

Chesterton, like Belloc, openly expressed his abhorrence of Adolf Hitler's rule almost as soon as it started. As Rabbi Stephen Samuel Wise wrote in a posthumous tribute to Chesterton in 1937:

When Hitlerism came, he was one of the first to speak out with all the directness and frankness of a great and unabashed spirit. Blessing to his memory!

In The Truth About the Tribes, Chesterton attacked Nazi racial theories, writing: "the essence of Nazi Nationalism is to preserve the purity of a race in a continent where all races are impure".

The historian Simon Mayers points out that Chesterton wrote in works such as The Crank, The Heresy of Race, and The Barbarian as Bore against the concept of racial superiority and critiqued pseudo-scientific race theories, saying they were akin to a new religion. In The Truth About the Tribes Chesterton wrote, "the curse of race religion is that it makes each separate man the sacred image which he worships. His own bones are the sacred relics; his own blood is the blood of St. Januarius". Mayers records that despite "his hostility towards Nazi antisemitism … [it is unfortunate that he made] claims that 'Hitlerism' was a form of Judaism, and that the Jews were partly responsible for race theory". In The Judaism of Hitler, as well as in A Queer Choice and The Crank, Chesterton made much of the fact that the very notion of "a Chosen Race" was of Jewish origin, saying in The Crank: "If there is one outstanding quality in Hitlerism it is its Hebraism" and "the new Nordic Man has all the worst faults of the worst Jews: jealousy, greed, the mania of conspiracy, and above all, the belief in a Chosen Race".

Mayers also shows that Chesterton portrayed Jews not only as culturally and religiously distinct, but racially as well. In The Feud of the Foreigner (1920) he said that the Jew "is a foreigner far more remote from us than is a Bavarian from a Frenchman; he is divided by the same type of division as that between us and a Chinaman or a Hindoo. He not only is not, but never was, of the same race".

In The Everlasting Man, while writing about human sacrifice, Chesterton suggested that medieval stories about Jews killing children might have resulted from a distortion of genuine cases of devil worship. Chesterton wrote:

[T]he Hebrew prophets were perpetually protesting against the Hebrew race relapsing into an idolatry that involved such a war upon children; and it is probable enough that this abominable apostasy from the God of Israel has occasionally appeared in Israel since, in the form of what is called ritual murder; not of course by any representative of the religion of Judaism, but by individual and irresponsible diabolists who did happen to be Jews.

The American Chesterton Society has devoted a whole issue of its magazine, Gilbert, to defending Chesterton against charges of antisemitism. Likewise, Ann Farmer, author of Chesterton and the Jews: Friend, Critic, Defender, writes, "Public figures from Winston Churchill to Wells proposed remedies for the 'Jewish problem' – the seemingly endless cycle of anti-Jewish persecution – all shaped by their worldviews. As patriots, Churchill and Chesterton embraced Zionism; both were among the first to defend the Jews from Nazism", concluding that "A defender of Jews in his youth – a conciliator as well as a defender – GKC returned to the defence when the Jewish people needed it most."

=== Opposition to eugenics ===
In Eugenics and Other Evils, Chesterton attacked eugenics as Parliament was moving towards passage of the Mental Deficiency Act 1913. Some backing the ideas of eugenics called for the government to sterilise people deemed "mentally defective"; this view did not gain popularity but the idea of segregating them from the rest of society and thereby preventing them from reproducing did gain traction. These ideas disgusted Chesterton who wrote, "It is not only openly said, it is eagerly urged that the aim of the measure is to prevent any person whom these propagandists do not happen to think intelligent from having any wife or children."

Chesterton condemned the proposed wording for such measures as being so vague as to apply to anyone, including "Every tramp who is sulk, every labourer who is shy, every rustic who is eccentric, can quite easily be brought under such conditions as were designed for homicidal maniacs. That is the situation; and that is the point ... we are already under the Eugenist State; and nothing remains to us but rebellion." He derided such ideas as founded on nonsense, "as if one had a right to dragoon and enslave one's fellow citizens as a kind of chemical experiment". Chesterton mocked the idea that poverty was a result of bad breeding: "[it is a] strange new disposition to regard the poor as a race; as if they were a colony of Japs or Chinese coolies ... The poor are not a race or even a type. It is senseless to talk about breeding them; for they are not a breed. They are, in cold fact, what Dickens describes: 'a dustbin of individual accidents,' of damaged dignity, and often of damaged gentility."

=== Chesterton's Fence ===
"Chesterton's Fence" is the principle that reforms should not be made until the reasoning behind the existing state of affairs is understood. The quotation is from the 1929 Chesterton book entitled, The Thing: Why I Am a Catholic, in the chapter on "The Drift from Domesticity":

In the matter of reforming things, as distinct from deforming them, there is one plain and simple principle; a principle which will probably be called a paradox. There exists in such a case a certain institution or law; let us say, for the sake of simplicity, a fence or gate erected across a road. The more modern type of reformer goes gaily up to it and says, "I don't see the use of this; let us clear it away." To which the more intelligent type of reformer will do well to answer: "If you don't see the use of it, I certainly won't let you clear it away. Go away and think. Then, when you can come back and tell me that you do see the use of it, I may allow you to destroy it."

=== Distributism ===
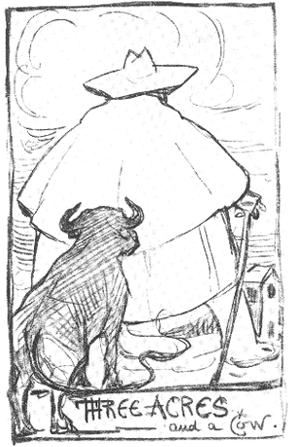
Self-portrait based on the distributist slogan "Three acres and a cow"

Inspired by Leo XIII's encyclical Rerum novarum, Chesterton's brother Cecil and his friend, Hilaire Belloc were instrumental in developing the economic philosophy of distributism, a word Belloc coined. Distributism stands as a third way, against both unrestrained capitalism, and socialism, advocating a wide distribution of both property and political power.

Gilbert embraced their views and, particularly after Cecil's death in World War I, became one of the foremost distributists. Gilbert also took on responsibility for “The New Witness” newspaper which Cecil had established. This ultimately came to be named G. K.'s Weekly, as Gilbert became its most consistent advocate.

=== Scottish and Irish nationalism ===
Chesterton was not an opponent of nationalism in general and gave a degree of support to Scottish nationalism and Irish nationalism. He endorsed Cunninghame Graham and Compton Mackenzie for the post of Lord Rector of Glasgow University in 1928 and 1931 respectively and praised Scottish Catholics as "patriots" in contrast to Anglophile Protestants such as John Knox. Chesterton was also a supporter of the Irish Home Rule movement and maintained friendships with members of the Irish Parliamentary Party. This was in part due to his belief that Irish Catholics had a naturally distributist outlook on property ownership.

== Legacy ==
James Parker, in The Atlantic, gave a modern appraisal:

In his vastness and mobility, Chesterton continues to elude definition: He was a Catholic convert and an oracular man of letters, a pneumatic cultural presence, an aphorist with the production rate of a pulp novelist. Poetry, criticism, fiction, biography, columns, public debate...Chesterton was a journalist; he was a metaphysician. He was a reactionary; he was a radical. He was a modernist, acutely alive to the rupture in consciousness that produced Eliot's "The Hollow Men"; he was an anti-modernist...a parochial Englishman and a post-Victorian gasbag; he was a mystic wedded to eternity. All of these cheerfully contradictory things are true...for the final, resolving fact that he was a genius. Touched once by the live wire of his thought, you don't forget it ... His prose ... [is] supremely entertaining, the stately outlines of an older, heavier rhetoric punctually convulsed by what he once called (in reference to the Book of Job) "earthquake irony". He fulminates wittily; he cracks jokes like thunder. His message, a steady illumination beaming and clanging through every lens and facet of his creativity, was really very straightforward: get on your knees, modern man, and praise God.

=== Possible sainthood ===
The Bishop Emeritus of Northampton, Peter Doyle, in 2012 had opened a preliminary investigation into possibly launching a cause for beatification and then canonization (for possible sainthood), but eventually decided not to open the cause. Doyle cited Chesterton's lack of a cult of local devotion, his lack of a "pattern of spirituality" and charges that he was antisemitic. In 2023 the next Bishop of Northampton, David Oakley, agreed to preach at a Mass during a Chesterton pilgrimage in England (the route goes through London and Beaconsfield, which are both connected to his life). If the cause had been actually opened at the diocesan level (the Vatican must also give approval, that nothing stands in the way – the "nihil obstat"), then he could be given the title "Servant of God". His life and writings and views and what he did for others would be closely examined, although it is not known if his alleged antisemitism (which would be considered a serious matter by the Church if it is true) played a role.

=== Literary ===
Chesterton's socio-economic system of Distributism affected the sculptor Eric Gill, who established a commune of Catholic artists at Ditchling in Sussex. The Ditchling group developed a journal called The Game, in which they expressed many Chestertonian principles, particularly anti-industrialism and an advocacy of religious family life. His novel The Man Who Was Thursday inspired the Irish Republican leader Michael Collins with the idea that "If you didn't seem to be hiding nobody hunted you out." Collins's favourite work of Chesterton was The Napoleon of Notting Hill, and he was "almost fanatically attached to it", according to his friend Sir William Darling. His column in The Illustrated London News on 18 September 1909 had a profound effect on Mahatma Gandhi. P. N. Furbank asserts that Gandhi was "thunderstruck" when he read it, while Martin Green notes that "Gandhi was so delighted with this that he told Indian Opinion to reprint it". Another convert was Canadian media theorist Marshall McLuhan, who said that the book What's Wrong with the World (1910) changed his life in terms of ideas and religion. The author Neil Gaiman stated that he grew up reading Chesterton in his school's library, and that The Napoleon of Notting Hill influenced his own book Neverwhere. Gaiman based the character Gilbert from the comic book The Sandman on Chesterton, and Good Omens, the novel Gaiman co-wrote with Terry Pratchett, is dedicated to Chesterton. The Argentine author and essayist Jorge Luis Borges cited Chesterton as influential on his fiction, telling interviewer Richard Burgin that "Chesterton knew how to make the most of a detective story".

=== Education ===
Chesterton's many references to education and human formation have inspired a variety of educators including the 69 schools of the Chesterton Schools Network, which includes the Chesterton Academy founded by Dale Ahlquist. and the Italian Scuola Libera G. K. Chesterton in San Benedetto del Tronto, Marche. The publisher and educator Christopher Perrin (who completed his doctoral work on Chesterton) makes frequent reference to Chesterton in his work with classical schools.

=== Namesakes ===
In 1974, Ian Boyd, founded The Chesterton Review, a scholarly journal devoted to Chesterton and his circle. The journal is published by the G. K. Chesterton Institute for Faith and Culture based in Seton Hall University, South Orange, New Jersey.

In 1996, Dale Ahlquist founded the American Chesterton Society to explore and promote Chesterton's writings.

In 2008, a Catholic high school, Chesterton Academy, opened in the Minneapolis area. In the same year Scuola Libera Chesterton opened in San Benedetto del Tronto, Italy.

In 2012, a crater on the planet Mercury was named Chesterton after the author.

In 2014, G. K. Chesterton Academy of Chicago and Chesterton Academy of Buffalo, Catholic high schools, opened in Highland Park, Illinois and Buffalo, New York.

A fictionalised G. K. Chesterton is the central character in the G K Chesterton Mystery series, a series of detective novels by the Australian author Kel Richards.

== Major works ==
=== Books ===
- Chesterton, Gilbert Keith (1904), Ward, M. (ed.), The Napoleon of Notting Hill
- ——— (1903), Robert Browning, Macmillan
- ——— (1905), Heretics, John Lane
- ——— (30 August 1906), Charles Dickens: A Critical Study (1st British ed.), London: Methuen & Co., OCLC 273957952; ——— (September 1906), Charles Dickens: A Critical Study (1st American ed.), New York, N.Y.: Dodd Mead & Company, OCLC 626764
- ——— (1908a), The Man Who Was Thursday
- ——— (1908b), Orthodoxy
- ——— (1911a), The Innocence of Father Brown, Cassel and Co London, published in Penguin Books, Harmondsworth, Middlesex, 1950 (Number 765, Mystery and crime, "Father Brown" series 1/6, 248 p.). Reprinted 1951 etc.
- ——— (1911b), The Ballad of the White Horse
- ——— (1912), Manalive
- The Flying Inn (1914)
- ——— (1916), The Crimes of England
- ———, Father Brown (short stories) (detective fiction)
- ——— (1920), Ward, M. (ed.), The New Jerusalem, archived from the original on 15 January 2017
- ——— (2018) [1922]. The Man Who Knew Too Much. Simon & Brown. ISBN 978-1731700568.
- ——— (1922), Eugenics and Other Evils
- ——— (1923), Saint Francis of Assisi
- ——— (1925), The Everlasting Man
- ——— (1925), William Cobbett
- ——— (1933), Saint Thomas Aquinas
- ——— (1935), The Well and the Shallows
- ——— (1936), The Autobiography
- ——— (1950), Ward, M. (ed.), The Common Man, archived from the original on 15 January 2017

=== Short stories ===
- "The Trees of Pride", 1922
- "The Crime of the Communist", Collier's Weekly, July 1934.
- "The Three Horsemen", Collier's Weekly, April 1935.
- "The Ring of the Lovers", Collier's Weekly, April 1935.
- "A Tall Story", Collier's Weekly, April 1935.
- "The Angry Street – A Bad Dream", Famous Fantastic Mysteries, February 1947.

=== Plays ===
- Magic, 1913.

== See also ==
- American Chesterton Society
