= John Ashbery bibliography =

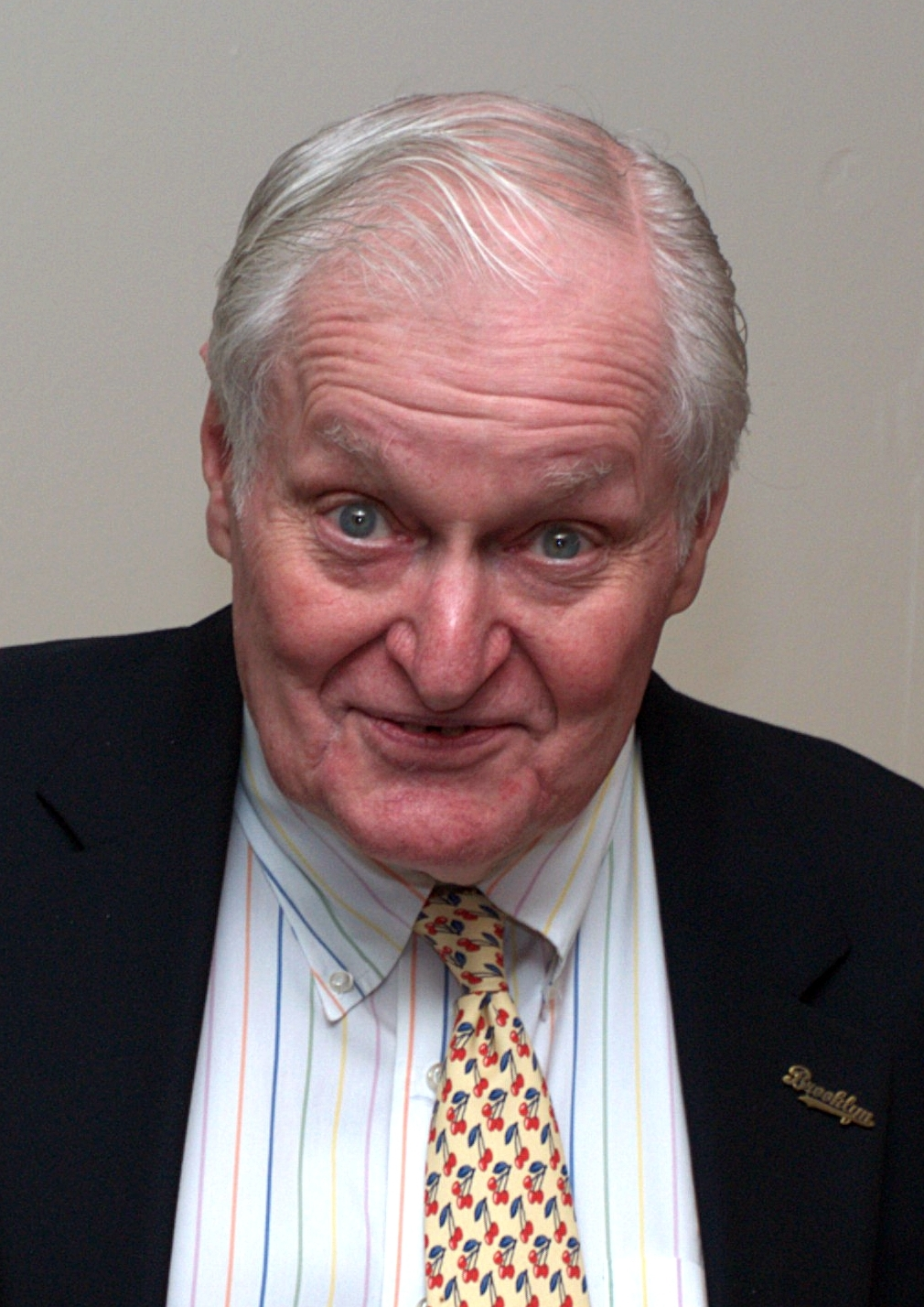
- Ashbery in 2010
- Books↙: 34
- Novels↙: 1
- Collections↙: 11
- Plays↙: 5
- Interviews↙: 2
- Academic theses↙: 2

The bibliography of John Ashbery includes poetry, literary criticism, art criticism, journalism, drama, fiction, and translations of verse and prose. His most significant body of work is in poetry, having published numerous poetry collections, book-length poems, and limited edition chapbooks. In his capacity as a journalist and art critic, he contributed to magazines like New York and Newsweek. He served for a time as the editor of Art and Literature: an International Review and as executive editor of Art News. In drama and fiction, he wrote five plays and cowrote the novel A Nest of Ninnies with James Schuyler. Beyond his original works, he translated verse and prose from French. Many of his works of poetry, prose, drama, and translations have been compiled in volumes of collected writings.

== Books ==
=== Verse ===
Ashbery published 26 books of poetry (not including his limited edition books, listed below). Most of them are poetry collections, which typically contain a mix of new and previously published poems. Flow Chart and Girls on the Run are book-length long poems.

Year	Title	Publisher	First edition catalog no. (Note: The International Standard Book Number (ISBN) system was not formally introduced until 1970 and, consequently, first editions of Ashbery's pre-1970 books did not have an ISBN. Instead, the Library of Congress Control Number (LCCN) is used. Later editions of these early works typically have an ISBN. Even after 1970, several of the limited-edition books do not have ISBNs, in which case the LCCN is used.)	Notes
1956	Some Trees	Yale University Press	LCCN 56-5940	Yale Series of Younger Poets, volume 52. With a foreword by W. H. Auden.
1962	The Tennis Court Oath	Wesleyan University Press	LCCN 56-5940	—N/a
1966	Rivers and Mountains	Holt, Rinehart and Winston	LCCN 65-22471	—N/a
1970	The Double Dream of Spring	E. P. Dutton and Company	LCCN 77-87191	—N/a
1972	Three Poems	Viking Press	ISBN 0-670-70906-9	Prose poetry.
1975	The Vermont Notebook	Black Sparrow Press	ISBN 0-87685-227-4	Illustrations by Joe Brainard.
1975	Self-Portrait in a Convex Mirror	Viking Press	ISBN 0-670-63283-X	—N/a
1977	Houseboat Days	Viking Press	ISBN 0-670-38035-0	—N/a
1979	As We Know	Viking Press	ISBN 0-670-13780-4	—N/a
1981	Shadow Train	Viking Press	ISBN 0-670-63786-6	—N/a
1984	A Wave	Viking Press	ISBN 0-670-75176-6	—N/a
1987	April Galleons	Viking Press	ISBN 0-670-81958-1	—N/a
1991	Flow Chart	Alfred A. Knopf	ISBN 0-670-81958-1	Long poem.
1992	Hotel Lautréamont	Alfred A. Knopf	ISBN 0-679-41512-2	—N/a
1994	And the Stars Were Shining	Farrar, Straus and Giroux	ISBN 0-374-10500-6	—N/a
1995	Can You Hear, Bird	Farrar, Straus and Giroux	ISBN 0-374-11831-0	—N/a
1998	Wakefulness	Farrar, Straus and Giroux	ISBN 0-374-28598-5	—N/a
1999	Girls on the Run	Farrar, Straus and Giroux	ISBN 0-374-16270-0	Long poem.
2000	Your Name Here	Farrar, Straus and Giroux	ISBN 0-374-29598-0	—N/a
2002	Chinese Whispers	Farrar, Straus and Giroux	ISBN 0-374-12257-1	—N/a
2005	Where Shall I Wander	Ecco Press	ISBN 0-06-076529-1	—N/a
2007	A Worldly Country	Ecco Press	ISBN 0-06-117383-5	—N/a
2009	Planisphere	Ecco Press	ISBN 978-0-06-191521-5	—N/a
2012	Quick Question	Ecco Press	ISBN 978-0-06-222595-5	—N/a
2015	Breezeway	Ecco Press	ISBN 978-0-06-238702-8	—N/a
2016	Commotion of the Birds	Ecco Press	ISBN 978-0-06-256509-9	—N/a

==== Translated verse ====
Year	Title	Original author	Publisher	ISBN
2008	The Landscapist: Selected Poems	Pierre Martory	Sheep Meadow Press – distributed by University Press of New England	ISBN 978-1-931357-52-4
2011	Illuminations	Arthur Rimbaud	W. W. Norton & Company	ISBN 978-0-393-07635-6

==== Limited edition ====
The first edition of these works were printed in a limited edition. They are often printed as chapbooks, with each copy numbered and with a set number of signed copies. Many of these books are collaborations with visual artists or other poets. The contents of these books often share significant overlap with Ashbery's poetry collections; for example, Turandot and Other Poems overlaps significantly with Some Trees.

Year	Title	Publisher	First edition catalog no.	Notes
1953	Turandot and Other Poems	Editions of the Tibor de Nagy Gallery	LCCN 2015-657560	Includes illustrations by Jane Freilicher. Published as a chapbook. Although it was published before Some Trees, most of its poems were also collected in that book, which is regarded as the first (or first "major") volume of Ashbery's poetry. Limited edition of 300 copies.
1960	The Poems	Tiber Press	LCCN 67-1547	Includes prints by Joan Mitchell. Limited edition of 225 copies; 25 are numbered, 200 are signed.
1968	Sunrise in Suburbia	Phoenix Book Shop	—N/a	Chapbook containing the poem of the same name. Limited edition of 126 copies.
1968	Three Madrigals	Poets Press	—N/a	Chapbook containing the poem of the same name. Published by Diane di Prima's Poets Press. The poem is reproduced as a facsimile (copy) of Ashbery's handwritten original, which includes several drawings. Limited edition of 162 copies.
1969	Fragment	Black Sparrow Press	—N/a	Chapbook containing the poem of the same name. Limited edition of 1,020 copies.
1970	Evening in the Country	Spanish Main Press	—N/a	Chapbook containing the poem of the same name.
1970	The New Spirit	Adventures in Poetry	—N/a	Chapbook containing the poem of the same name. Limited edition of 65 copies.
1975	The Serious Doll	Kermani Press	—N/a	Chapbook containing the poem of the same name. Limited, numbered, and signed edition of 50 copies.
1975	The Vermont Notebook	Black Sparrow Press	ISBN 0-87685-227-4	Two special first editions: Signed and numbered edition of 250 copies; Signed and lettered edition of 26 copies, each with an original ink drawing by Joe Brainard
1981	Apparitions: Poems	Lord John Press	ISBN 0-935716-10-6	Galway Kinnell, W. S. Merwin, Liz Rosenberg, Dave Smith. Limited edition of 300 copies, signed by all five authors.
1984	Self-Portrait in a Convex Mirror	Arion Press	—N/a	Fine art edition containing the poem of the same name. Packaged in a stainless steel film canister. Contains a new foreword by Ashbery; a 12-inch vinyl record with a recording of Ashbery reading the poem; an essay by Helen Vendler; original prints by Richard Avedon, Elaine de Kooning, Willem de Kooning, Jim Dine, Jane Freilicher, Alex Katz, R. B. Kitaj, and Larry Rivers. Limited edition of 175 copies.
1984	Spring Day	Palaemon Press	—N/a	Chapbook containing the poem of the same name.
1987	The Ice Storm	Hanuman Books	—N/a	Chapbook containing the poem of the same name.
1990	Haibun	Hanuman Books	—N/a	Chapbook containing the six haibun poems from A Wave. Illustrations by Judith Shea.
1991	The Kaiser's Children	Charles Seluzicki	—N/a	Fine art edition containing excerpts from the poem "Dreams of Adulthood", which was originally published. Includes illustrations by Eric Stotik. Limited, numbered edition of 50 copies, signed by Ashbery and Stotik.
1998	Description of a Masque	Limited Editions Club	—N/a	Contains the poem of the same name. Includes illustrations by Jane Freilicher. Limited, numbered edition of 300 copies.
1998	Novel	Grenfell Press	—N/a	Contains the poem of the same name, written in 1954 but previously unpublished. Includes illustrations by Trevor Winkfield. Limited, numbered edition of 100 copies, plus 15 artists' proofs; all copies signed by Ashbery and Winkfield.
1999	Who Knows What Constitutes a Life	Z Press	LCCN 2015-657570	Chapbook containing the poem of the same name. Illustrated by Elizabeth Murray. Limited edition chapbook of 200 copies, with 26 copies lettered A to Z signed by the poet and the artist with an original print by Elizabeth Murray.
2001	100 Multiple-Choice Questions	Adventures in Poetry	ISBN 0-9706250-0-6	Reprint of a poem first published in the January 1970 issue of the journal Adventures in Poetry. Limited edition of 500 copies.
2001	As Umbrellas Follow Rain	Qua Books	ISBN 0-9708763-0-0	Dust jacket art by Tom Burckhard. Limited edition in two runs: 100 numbered copies signed by Ashbery and Burckhard, and 900 unnumbered unsigned copies.
1999	The Recital / Le Récital	Ergo Pers Artists' Books	—N/a	Contains the prose poem of the same name (originally published in Three Poems). Bilingual edition in English and French. Translation by Franck André Jamme. Illustrated by Hanns Schimansky. Limited edition chapbook of 40 copies.

=== Prose ===
Year	Title	Publisher	First edition catalog no.	Notes
1969	A Nest of Ninnies	E. P. Dutton and Company	LCCN 69-17307	A novel written in collaboration with James Schuyler. New edition by Dalkey Archive Press in 2008 (ISBN 978-1-56478-520-6).
2000	Other Traditions	Harvard University Press	ISBN 0-674-00315-2	A book of literacy criticism about six writers who Ashbery turns to for inspiration: John Clare, Thomas Lovell Beddoes, Raymond Roussel, John Wheelwright, Laura Riding, and David Schubert.

=== Compiled works ===
==== Collected verse ====
Year	Title	Publisher	First edition catalog no.	Notes
1967	Selected Poems	Jonathan Cape	LCCN 97-89583	Contains selected poems from: Some Trees; The Tennis Court Oath; Rivers and Mountains
1985	Selected Poems	Penguin Books	ISBN 0-670-80917-9	Contains selected poems from: Some Trees; The Tennis Court Oath; Rivers and Mountains; The Double Dream of Spring; Three Poems; Self-Portrait in a Convex Mirror; Houseboat Days; As We Know; Shadow Train; A Wave
1993	Three Books	Penguin Books	ISBN 0-14-058702-0	Collects all poems from Houseboat Days, Shadow Train, and A Wave.
1997	The Mooring of Starting Out: The First Five Books of Poetry	Carcanet Press	ISBN 1-85754-366-1	Contains: Some Trees; The Tennis Court Oath; Rivers and Mountains; The Double Dream of Spring; Three Poems
2007	Notes from the Air: Selected Later Poems	Ecco Press	ISBN 978-0-06-136717-5	Contains selected poems and excerpts from: April Galleons; Flow Chart (excerpted); Hotel Lautréamont; And the Stars Were Shining; Can You Hear, Bird; Wakefulness; Girls on the Run (excerpted); Your Name Here; As Umbrellas Follow Rain; Chinese Whispers; Where Shall I Wander
2008	Collected Poems 1956–1987	Library of America	ISBN 1-59853-028-3	Library of America series, volume 187. Edited by Mark Ford. Contains all poems from Some Trees, The Tennis Court Oath, Rivers and Mountains, The Double Dream of Spring, Three Poems, The Vermont Notebook, Self-Portrait in a Convex Mirror, Houseboat Days, As We Know, Shadow Train, A Wave, and April Galleons, as well as previously uncollected poems.
2014	Collected French Translations: Poetry	Farrar, Straus and Giroux	ISBN 978-0-374-25802-3	Edited by Rosanne Wasserman and Eugene Richie.
2017	Collected Poems 1991–2000	Library of America	ISBN 1-59853-535-8	Library of America series, volume 301. Edited by Mark Ford; chronology by Mark Ford and David Kermani. Contains all poems from Flow Chart, Hotel Lautréamont, And the Stars Were Shining, Can You Hear, Bird, Wakefulness, Girls on the Run, and Your Name Here, as well as previously uncollected poems.
2018	They Knew What They Wanted: Poems and Collages	Rizzoli Electa	ISBN 978-0-8478-6056-2	Edited by Mark Polizzotti. Preface by Polizzotti, introduction and an interview with Ashbery by John Yau. Includes a selection of Ashbery's collages, several previously published poems, and a poem that had only been published once before in Karin Roffman's biography The Songs We Know Best: John Ashbery's Early Life (2017). It is Ashbery's first posthumous book—though, according to Polizzotti's preface, it was "for all intents and purposes finished before his passing".

==== Collected prose or drama ====
Year	Title	Publisher	First edition catalog no.	Notes
1978	Three Plays	Z Press	ISBN 0-915990-12-1	Contains the plays The Compromise, The Heroes, and The Philosophers.
1989	Reported Sightings: Art Chronicles 1957–1987	Alfred A. Knopf	ISBN 0-394-57387-0	Edited by David Bergman. Contains selected articles of art criticism and journalism.
2005	Selected Prose 1953–2003	University of Michigan Press	ISBN 0-472-11439-5	Edited by Eugene Richie.
2014	Collected French Translations: Prose	Farrar, Straus and Giroux	ISBN 978-0-374-25803-0	Edited by Rosanne Wasserman and Eugene Richie.

== Plays ==
Year	Work	Notes
1950	The Heroes	Included in Three Plays. Written in 1950; first staged by the Living Theatre in 1952.
1955	The Compromise	Included in Three Plays. Written in 1955; first staged by the Poets Theatre in Cambridge, Massachusetts in 1956. The text of the play includes Ashbery's poem "America". The Compromise was published in the one-shot review The Hasty Papers (1960), edited by Alfred Leslie.
1956	The Milky Coconut	Four scenes from the play were published in two issues of Semi-Colon; otherwise unpublished.
1959	The Philosopher	Included in Three Plays.
1960	To the Mill	A short verse play. First published in Alfred Leslie's one-shot review The Hasty Papers (1960).

== Journalism ==
Asbery wrote numerous journalistic articles—mostly art criticism—in the International Herald Tribune, New York magazine, Newsweek, and other periodicals. Ashbery also edited the periodicals Art and Literature: An International Review and Art News.

== Interviews ==
Ashbery has been the interviewee in numerous published interviews. There has been one book-length interview published to date: John Ashbery in Conversation with Mark Ford. Only interviews published in books are listed here, not interviews published in periodicals or websites.

Year	Title	Interviewer	Publisher	ISBN	Notes
2003	John Ashbery in Conversation with Mark Ford	Mark Ford	Between the Lines (UK); Dufour Editions (US)	ISBN 1-903291-12-7	Book-length interview.
2013	Our Deep Gossip: Conversations with Gay Writers on Poetry and Desire	Christopher Hennessy	University of Wisconsin Press	ISBN 9780299295646	Interview with Ashbery at pp. 53–78.

== Academic theses ==
Year	Title	Notes
1949	The Poetic Medium of W. H. Auden	For his B.A. at Harvard University. About the English-American poet W. H. Auden.
1951	Three Novels of Henry Green	For his M.A. at Columbia University. About the English author Henry Green's novels Living (1929), Party Going (1939), and Concluding (1948).

== Sources ==
- Anon. (n.d.). "[New York School] As Umbrellas Follow Rain [Signed] | John Ashbery | Limited Edition". Fine Editions Ltd: Rare & Antiquarian Books. Archived from the original on July 20, 2019.
- Anon. (n.d.). "John Ashbery | Selected bibliography". Ergo Pers Artists' Books. Archived from the original on August 17, 2019.
- Anon. (2003). "John Ashbery: Staged Reading of 'The Compromise,' Paris, 2007". PennSound.
- Ashbery, John; Briscese, Rosangela; Kermani, David (2007). "Three Early Works ['Song from a Play'; 'The Poems'; 'Three Madrigals']". Conjunctions (49): 232–251. JSTOR 24516469.
- Ford, Mark (2008). "Notes on the Texts". Collected Poems 1956–1987. By Ashbery, John. Ford, Mark (ed.). The Library of America series. Vol. 187. Library of America. pp. 1006–1013. ISBN 978-1-59853-028-5.
- Kermani, David (2004). "Elementary Ashbery (an essay)". Ashbery Resource Center – a project of The Flow Chart Foundation. Archived from the original on April 20, 2015.
- Kermani, David; Morrissette, Micaela; Rudegeair, Anni; Hendrix, Jenny; Briscese, Rosangela (2004). "Annotated Catalogue of the ARC Archive". Ashbery Resource Center – a project of The Flow Chart Foundation.
- Lehman, David (1999). "A Hasty Note on Alfred Leslie's The Hasty Papers (1960)". In Leslie, Alfred (ed.). The Hasty Papers: Special Millennium Edition of the 1960 One-Shot Review. Host Publications. pp. 56–62. ISBN 0-924047-12-7 – via Google Books.
- Oliver, Roger (Winter 1979). "Interview: Poet in the Theatre". Performing Arts Journal. 3 (3). MIT Press: 15–27. doi:10.2307/3245102. JSTOR 3245102. S2CID 192334390.
- Polizzotti, Mark (2018). "Preface; Credits and Acknowledgements". They Knew What They Wanted: Poems and Collages. By Ashbery, John. Polizzotti, Mark (ed.). Rizzoli Electa. pp. 7–8, 127. ISBN 978-0-8478-6056-2.
- Storey, David; Miller, Leslie; Kermani, David (May–June 2016). "Voices in Print: Grenfell Press". Art in Print. 6 (1). Archived from the original on August 17, 2019.
