= Self-Portrait in a Convex Mirror (poetry collection) =

1975 book by John Ashbery

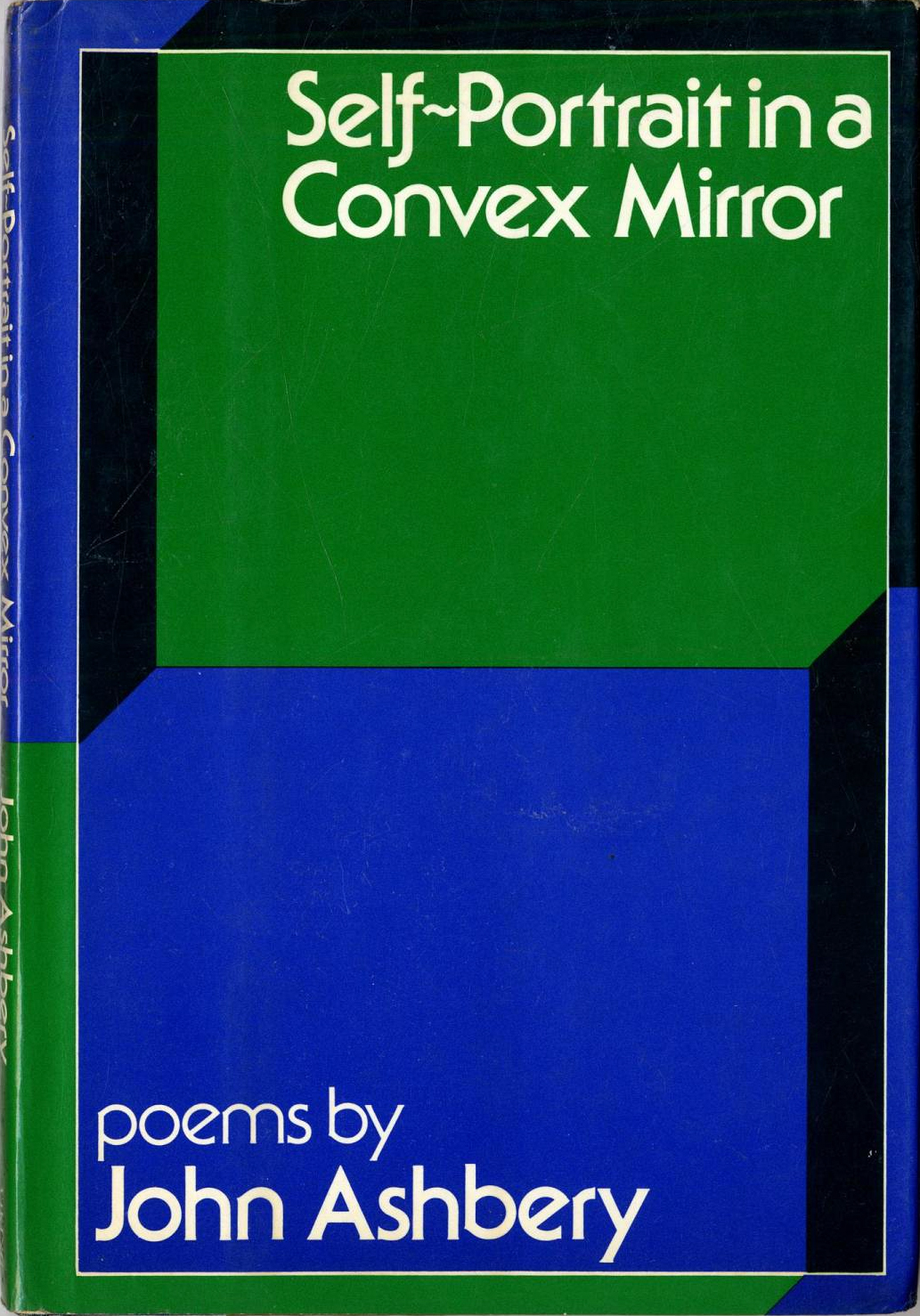
- First edition
- Author: John Ashbery
- Language: English
- Publisher: Viking Press
- Publication date: May 15, 1975
- Publication place: United States
- Pages: 83
- ISBN: 0-14-058668-7

Self-Portrait in a Convex Mirror is a 1975 poetry collection by the American writer John Ashbery. The title, shared with its final poem, comes from the painting of the same name by the Late Renaissance artist Parmigianino. The book won the Pulitzer Prize, the National Book Award, and the National Book Critics Circle Award, the only book to have received all three awards.

Published when he was approaching the age of 50, Self-Portrait in a Convex Mirror was a major breakthrough after a career marked by relative obscurity, and either lukewarm or outright hostile reviews.

== Background ==
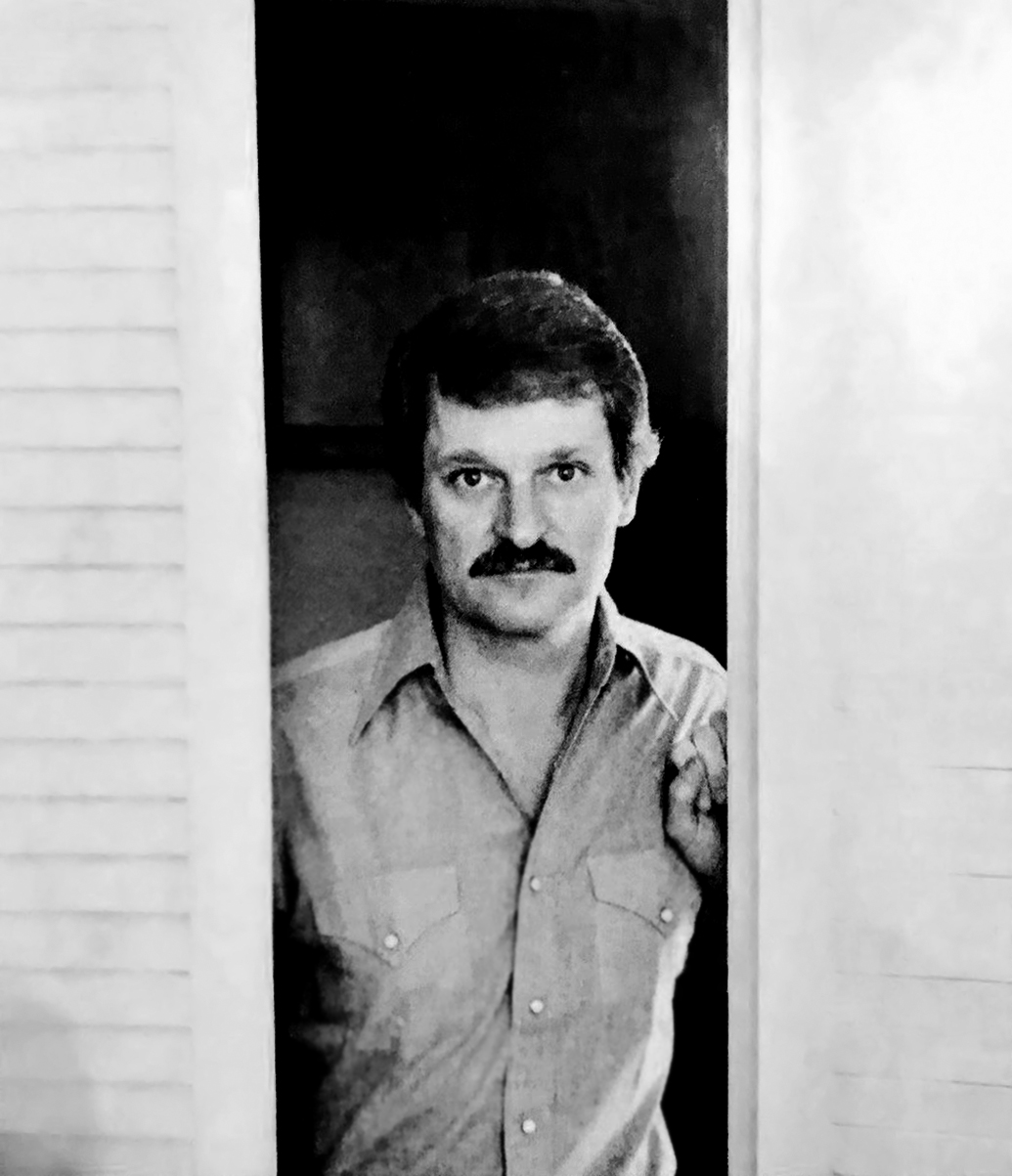
Ashbery, c. 1974–75. Portrait by Michael Teague from the dust jacket of Self-Portrait in a Convex Mirror.

Ashbery developed an early, idiosyncratic, avant-garde poetic style that attracted little critical notice—and the few reviews he did receive were usually negative. His first collection, Some Trees (1956), was chosen by W. H. Auden as the winner of that year's Yale Series of Younger Poets Competition. Despite this, evidence suggests that Auden—whom Ashbery frequently described as his most significant literary influence—did not actually enjoy Ashbery's writing. (Note: After rejecting every other applicant who had reached the final round of consideration, Auden was provided with entries submitted by Ashbery and Frank O'Hara, both of whom had already been screened out by other judges earlier in the competition. He chose Ashbery as the winner essentially by default, despite his misgivings, and wrote an unenthusiastic preface for the collection. From a letter by James Schuyler to Kenneth Koch, later discovered by Ashbery: "[Auden] didn't think either of them very good, and he chose John's faute de mieux"—i.e., for lack of anything better. Nevertheless, Ashbery esteemed Auden as "not ... simply one among a number of other twentieth-century influences, but the influential figure in his career." See Hickman 2012, p. 132.)

Ashbery adopted an avant-garde style for The Tennis Court Oath (1962) at the cost of brutally negative reviews. Critics derided the book as incomprehensible and absent of any redeeming qualities, which almost drove Ashbery to quit writing poetry altogether.

He was grouped with the so called "New York School", a loose collection of modern poets with ties to the contemporary art and new music scenes in New York City. The group included his close friend Frank O'Hara, as well as Kenneth Koch, James Schuyler, and Barbara Guest. Though Ashbery thought the label was ridiculous—he lived in Paris, not New York, from 1956 until the mid-1960s—it helped to raise his profile. His third collection, Rivers and Mountains (1966), was nominated for a National Book Award and received modest praise from critics.

Asked in 1976 about the widely held opinion that his early poems were "too difficult", if not outright impossible to understand, he replied:

At first, I was puzzled and hurt. I try to communicate—make clear, interpret—things which seem mysterious. The difficulty of my poetry isn't for its own sake; it is meant to reflect the difficulty of living, the everchanging, minute adjustments that go on around us and which we respond to from moment to moment—the difficulty of living in passing time, which is both difficult and automatic, since we all somehow manage it.

Having resigned himself to the idea that he would always be met with "this incomprehension" from the few readers he had, he said he decided to "make the best of a bad situation of someone who was destined never to have an audience"—though he realized the irony that, after Self-Portrait, he had in fact finally drawn an audience.

=== Ashbery and Parmigianino's painting ===
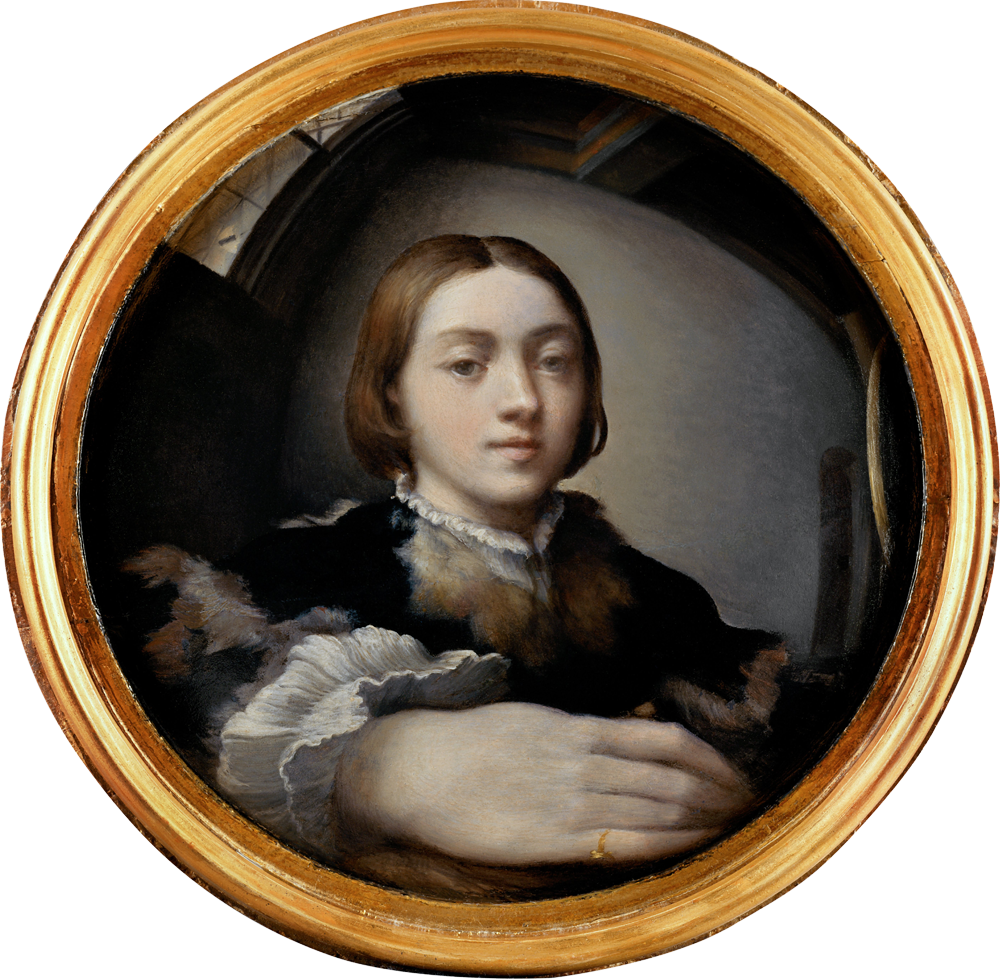
Parmigianino's Self-portrait in a Convex Mirror (c. 1524)

Ashbery first saw a copy of Parmigianino's Mannerist painting Self-portrait in a Convex Mirror (c. 1524) in 1950. At that time, Ashbery was pursuing an M.A. in English Literature at Columbia University. Having no plans for the summer and dreading that he would fail his upcoming final exams, he decided on impulse to postpone the exams, return home to Sodus, New York, and visit O'Hara in Boston. On the train home from Boston, he read the July 16 New York Times and came across "The Magic and Mystery of Artist Parmigianino", a review of a new book on Parmigianino by the art historian Sydney Freedberg. The article included a reproduction of Self-portrait in a Convex Mirror, which had had such a profound impression on him that he wrote to friends about the "truly divine Parmigianino."

In 1959, Ashbery viewed the original painting at the Kunsthistorisches Museum in Vienna. He was struck by "the strangeness and perfection of the whole enterprise, and the dreamlike image of the beautiful young man", and especially its title lingered in his memory. During a 1973 trip to Provincetown, Massachusetts, he purchased an inexpensive portfolio of Parmigianino's artwork from the window of a bookstore. The painting stirred him into contemplation once again, and he "slowly began to write a poem about it."

== Publication ==
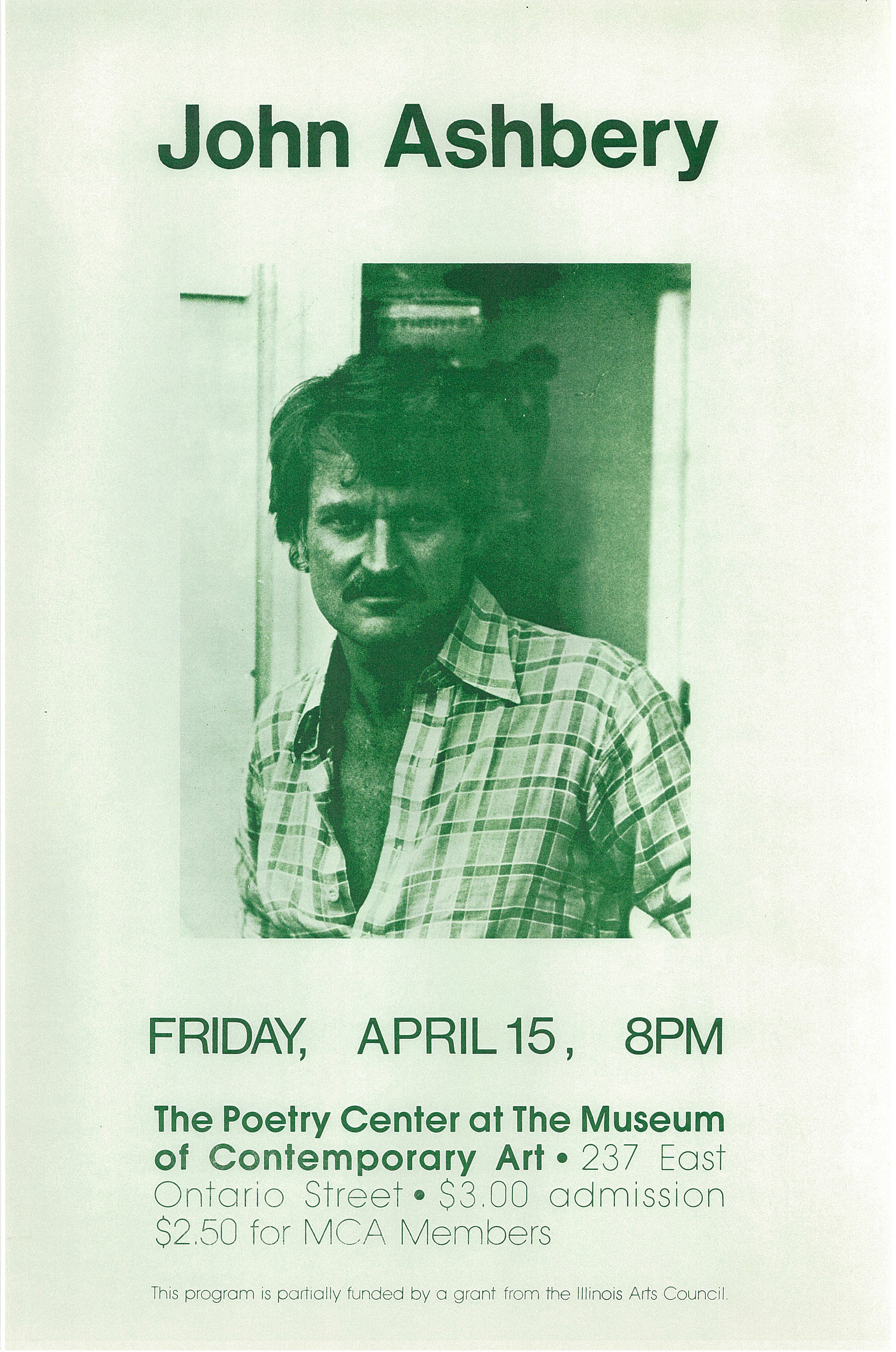
A poster for a poetry reading, displaying the photo portrait of Ashbery taken by Darragh Park for the 1975 Penguin paperback edition of Self-Portrait. A departure from his earlier preppy style, the portrait signaled Ashbery's increasing comfort with openly presenting himself as a gay man.

The first edition was published by Viking Press on May 15, 1975. The edition ran to 3,500 hardcover copies and featured a blue, green, and black geometric design on the dust jacket. A party was held at Gotham Book Mart in midtown Manhattan to celebrate the publication. Two paperback editions were published the next year, by Penguin Books in the United States and Carcanet Press in the United Kingdom. It became Ashbery's first book published with Carcanet.

Ashbery dedicated Self-Portrait to his partner and later husband, David Kermani. It was his second dedication to Kermani, after Three Poems (1973), with many more to follow. After first meeting in 1970, they became lifelong partners.

=== Cover designs ===
The Penguin paperback cover features a glamorous photo portrait of Ashbery by Darragh Park. Journalist Thomas Vinciguerra described Ashbery's pose as if "[stood] in all hunky glory, hips slightly cocked", wearing a "windowpane shirt open to midchest" and "tight slacks [that] have no belt loops." Matthew Zapruder wrote that his look was a "simultaneously ill-advised and completely stylish ensemble." Susan M. Schultz said the "cheesy" cover resembled a somewhat "cheap romance novel, like the kind you'd see near the checkout counter of a drugstore."

The bold look contrasted sharply with the conservative, uniformly preppy style Ashbery had adhered to throughout the 1960s. David Lehman recalled that, when he met Ashbery in 1967, the poet typically wore "a tie and a jacket and he always looked very natty." According to Lehman, his change in style reflected the progress of the post-Stonewall gay liberation movement, as Ashbery could present himself as "more visibly and publicly who he was."

Parmigianino's painting was not reproduced in early editions, a decision lamented by the critic Fred Moramarco, who said readers would be better able to appreciate the "reverberations" between the two works if they could view them simultaneously. Moramarco pointed out that the painting and poem had been published side-by-side in the January–February 1975 issue of the magazine Art in America. Later editions of the book have incorporated the painting into the cover design.

== Contents ==
The collection contains 35 poems, comprising a mix of new and previously published works; the latter had appeared in various American literary magazines between November 1972 and April 1975. A decade after its publication, 11 of its verse were collected as part of Ashbery's Selected Poems (1985). The entire book was included in his Collected Poems 1956–1987, published by the Library of America in 2008.

Self-Portrait in a Convex Mirror: table of contents
Order	Title	Previous publication		Included in Selected Poems
Order	Title	Date	Journal	Included in Selected Poems
1	"As One Put Drunk into the Packet Boat"	December 1974	The Georgia Review	Yes
2	"Worsening Situation"	January 12, 1975	The New Yorker	Yes
3	"Forties Flick"	November 28, 1974	The New York Review of Books	Yes
4	"As You Came from the Holy Land"	November 1973	Poetry	Yes
5	"A Man of Words"	November 1973	Poetry	No
6	"Scheherazade"	November 1973	Poetry	Yes
7	"Absolute Clearance"	February 1975	American Review	No
8	"Grand Galop"	April 1974	Poetry	Yes
9	"Poem in Three Parts"	—N/a		No
10	"Voyage in the Blue"	November 18, 1972	The New Yorker	No
11	"Farm"	—N/a		No
12	"Farm II"	Winter 1975	Partisan Review	No
13	"Farm III"	Winter 1975	The Iowa Review	No
14	"Hop o' My Thumb"	January 1975	Ohio Review	Yes
15	"De Imagine Mundi"	—N/a		No
16	"Foreboding"	—N/a		No
17	"The Tomb of Stuart Merrill"	—N/a		No
18	"Tarpaulin"	—N/a		No
19	"River"	Winter 1975	The Iowa Review	No
20	"Mixed Feelings"	April 3, 1975	The New York Review of Books	Yes
21	"The One Thing That Can Save America"	November 28, 1974	The New York Review of Books	No
22	"Tenth Symphony"	—N/a		No
23	"On Autumn Lake"	—N/a		No
24	"Fear of Death"	November 18, 1974	The New Yorker	No
25	"Ode to Bill"	—N/a		No
26	"Lithuanian Dance Band"	July 1973	The American Poetry Review	No
27	"Sand Pail"	—N/a		No
28	"No Way of Knowing"	—N/a		No
29	"Suite"	Winter 1975	The Iowa Review	No
30	"Märchenbilder"	Winter 1974	The Georgia Review	Yes
31	"City Afternoon"	December 2, 1974	The New Yorker	No
32	"Robin Hood's Barn"	—N/a		No
33	"All and Some"	—N/a		No
34	"Oleum Misericordiae"	Winter 1975	The Iowa Review	Yes
35	"Self-Portrait in a Convex Mirror"	August 1974	Poetry	Yes

Covers from some of the literary journals and magazines that published poems from Self-Portrait

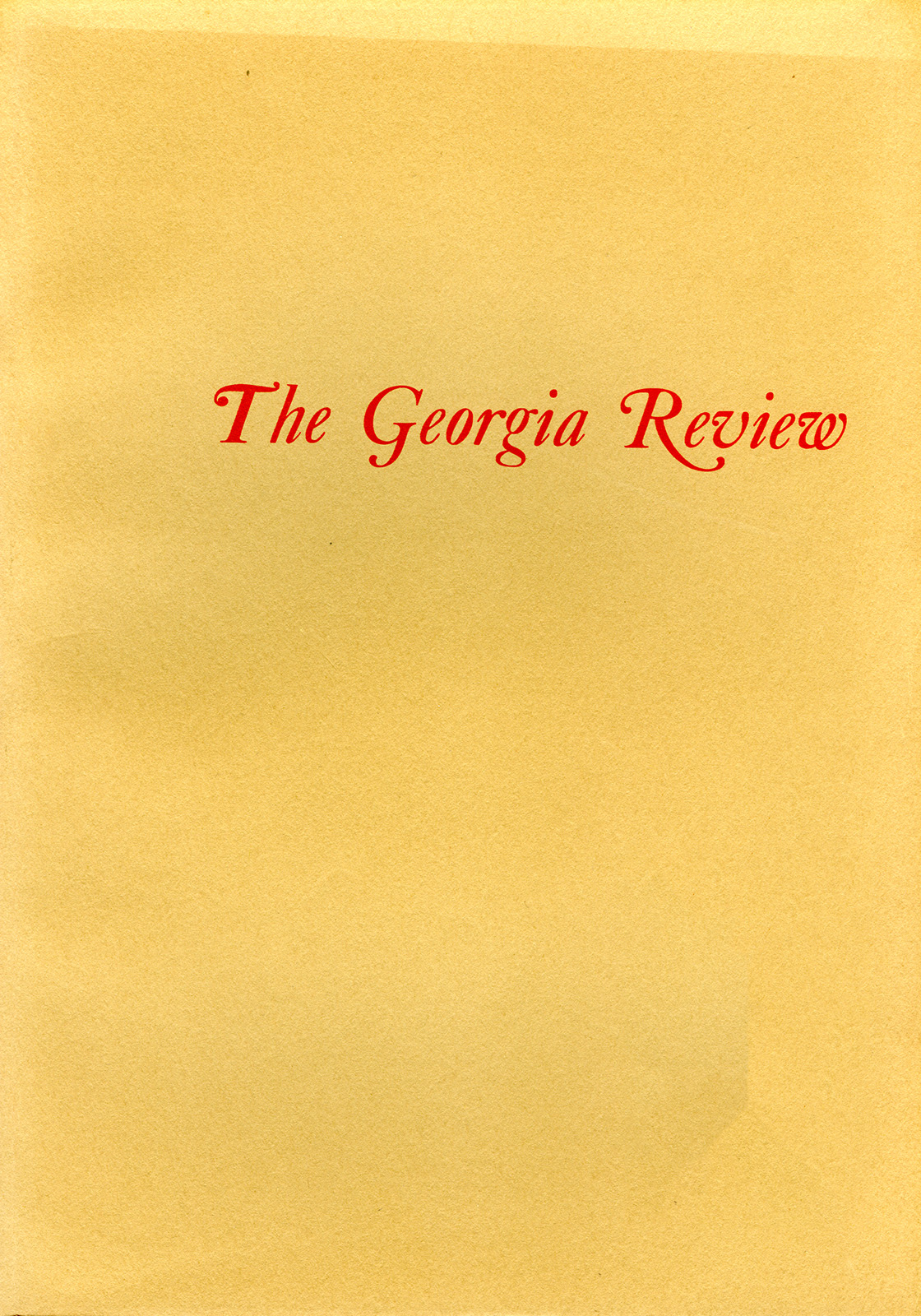
The Georgia Review (Winter 1974)

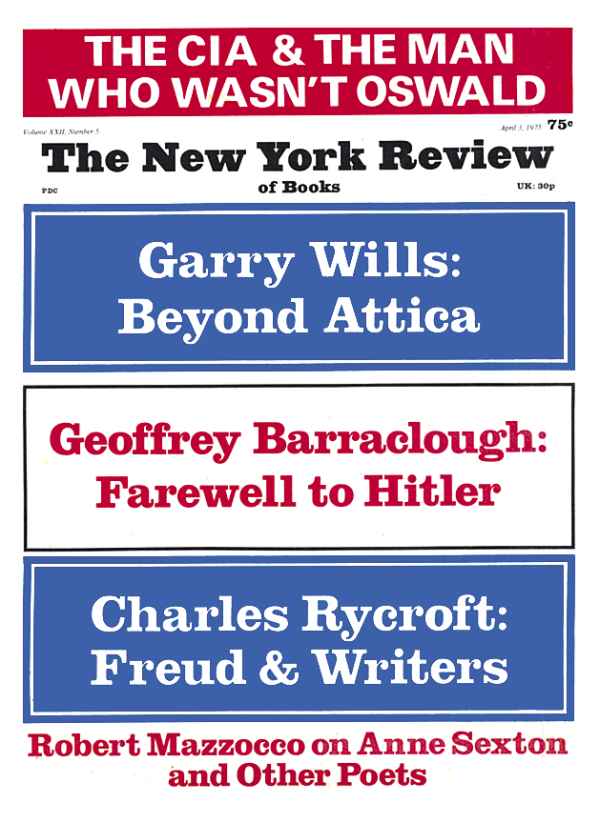
The New York Review of Books Vol. 22, No. 5 (April 3, 1975)

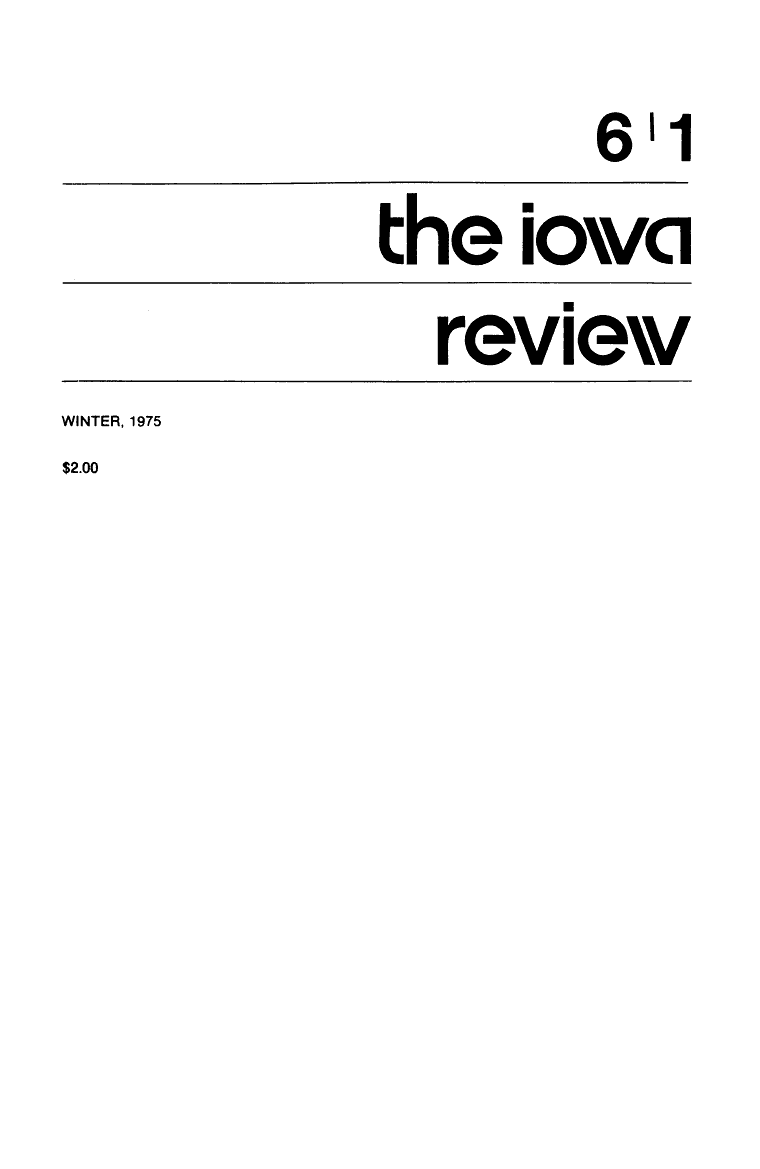
The Iowa Review (Winter 1975)

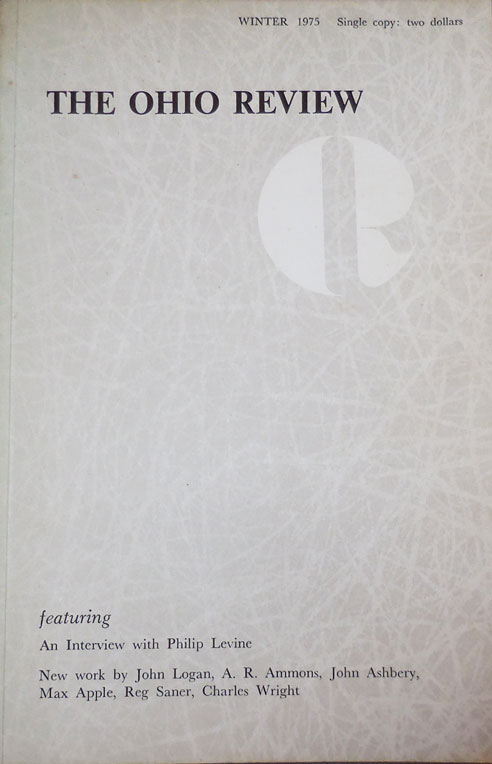
The Ohio Review (Winter 1975)

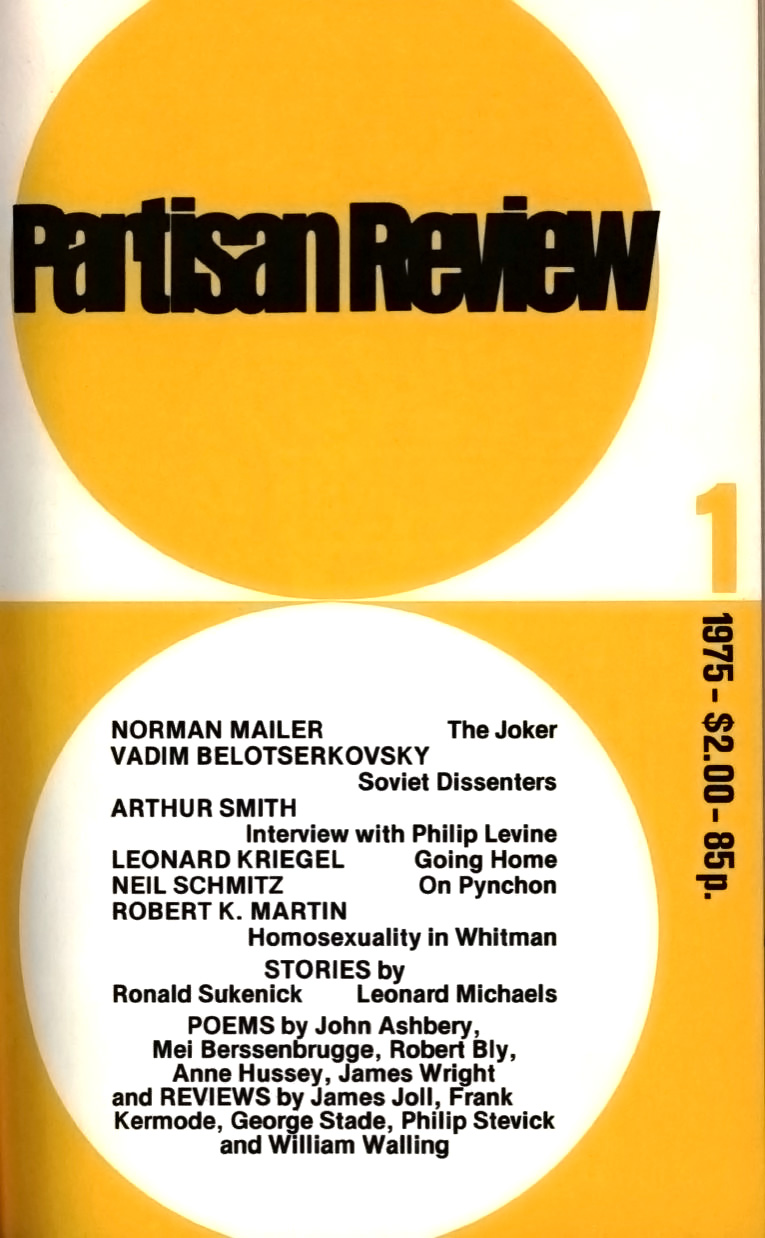
Partisan Review Vol. 42, No. 1 (Winter 1975)

=== Poems ===
"On Autumn Lake" makes ironic use of "Engrish" in its opening lines:

Leading liot act to foriage is activity
Of Chinese philosopher here on Autumn Lake thoughtfully inserted in
Plovince of Quebec—stop it! I will not.

Stephen J. Ross called these lines "a cringe-worthy parody of speech" and compared them with other instances from Ashbery's oeuvre of "orientalist" tropes in (purposefully) "bad taste", some more nuanced than others. (Note: "Theme Park Days" (from Chinese Whispers, 2002) includes the lines "Dickhead, they called him, for his name was Dong, Tram Van Dong"—another instance of mere "bad taste", per Ross. On the other hand, "Korean Soap Opera" (from Hotel Lautréamont, 1992) "addresses ... the environmental hazards of rapid industrialization through an ironic lens of Western stereotyping of Asia" and offered, in Ross's view, a more complex "parade of vague caricatures of clashing 'oriental' value systems that might, in fact, belong to any country: capitalism vs. communism; agrarianism vs. industrialism; segregation vs. egalitarianism; traditionalism vs. progress." See Ross 2017, p. 174.) Bonnie Costello quoted these lines—and, unlike the previous two critics, included "stop it! I will not"—as part of an analysis of Ashbery's relationship with the reader. The poet is "constantly testing his authorial power" and "will provoke the reader with perverse behavior, momentarily suspending the fact that the reader can veto by his indifference." But elsewhere, these instances of authorial "self-assurance" are counterposed and "repeatedly mocked by images of the reader's forgetfulness, lapses of attention, ultimate silence. ... The writer doesn't have mastery over the reader ... or even over his text, except insofar as he has preempted the reader's recalcitrance by including it."

== Style ==
As with much of Ashbery's poetry, Self-Portrait was influenced by contemporary developments in modern art, particularly painting. Since his early career, he felt poetry lagged behind the other arts, and sought to appropriate the techniques and effects of avant-garde painting, such as Cubism's "simultaneity" and abstract expressionism's "idea that the work is a sort of record of its own coming-into-existence", though he emphasized that his method was not random "like flinging a bucket of words on the page, as Pollock had with paint."

Ashbery was receptive to the idea that his poems could be understood as works of Mannerism—the Late Renaissance style that included Parmigianino's eponymous painting—but only the "pure novelty" of early Mannerists like Parmigianino, not the artificiality associated with the movement's later period.

== Interpretation ==
Critics generally described Self-Portrait as some of Ashbery's most accessible poetry, especially when compared to his more challenging, avant-garde work like the earlier collection The Tennis Court Oath (1962) or the book-length poem Flow Chart (1991). Nevertheless, attempts at interpreting—or even comprehending—the poems in Self-Portrait remain difficult.

Ashbery did not regard the collection as more accessible than his earlier work. In a 1976 interview with Richard Kostelanetz for The New York Times, he said the title poem only seemed "more accessible" because of its "essayistic thrust" but close reading would reveal it to be as "disjunct and fragmented" as his earlier poem "Europe", from The Tennis Court Oath (1962). "It's really not about the Parmigianino painting," Ashbery said; the ostensible subject was merely "a pretext for a lot of reflections and asides that are as tenuously connected to the core as they are in many of my poems which ... tend to spread out from a core idea." Kostelanetz said Ashbery's "most profound heresy" was the belief "that a poem should remain mostly inscrutable, no matter how long or closely anyone studies it."

Although Ashbery refrained from imposing his own interpretation on the reader, he rejected the idea that his poetry was political. For instance, Stephen Paul Miller wrote an essay theorizing that "Self-Portrait" was an elaborate commentary on the Watergate scandal, noting the poem was first published by Poetry in August 1974—the same month Richard Nixon announced his resignation. Ashbery told Miller that the poem had "nothing to do with Watergate, and more importantly, it was written before Watergate happened," to which Miller replied it made "absolutely no difference" to him when the poem had been written. In Miller's recollection, Ashbery joked "So you're comparing me to Nixon? Someday you'll get yours," then asserted that his poetry was not political in nature.

== Critical response ==
External audio
- Readings from the collection by Ashbery
- "Self Portrait in a Convex Mirror" read for The Voice of the Poet in 2001, in three parts: ""Self Portrait" part 1". University of Pennsylvania.; ""Self Portrait" part 2". University of Pennsylvania.; ""Self Portrait" part 3". University of Pennsylvania.
- Other poems from the collection read in 1973 on WFMT, Chicago: "Forties Flick". University of Pennsylvania. November 17, 1973.; "On Autumn Lake". University of Pennsylvania. November 17, 1973.; "Scheherazade". University of Pennsylvania. November 17, 1973.; – via UPenn.edu (more readings)

The initial academic and press reviews were generally positive, and especially praised the titular poem. Many critics described the collection as Ashbery's best work to date and among the best works of contemporary American poetry.

=== Harold Bloom's influence on other critics ===
Much of the early literary critic and peer opinion was heavily influenced by Harold Bloom, an early champion of Ashbery who had predicted the poet would "come to dominate the last third of the century as Yeats dominated the first." Bloom—a high-profile literary critic best known as the author of The Anxiety of Influence (1973)—had applauded Ashbery's early works and considered him as a "strong" or "great" American poet, a successor to Ralph Waldo Emerson, Walt Whitman, and Wallace Stevens. Bloom's review of Self-Portrait, published in The New Republic, was quoted in a blurb for the book's dust jacket:

This beautiful book is equal or superior to Ashbery's previous masterwork, The Double Dream of Spring ... Not even in that collection did Ashbery maintain so continuous a level of what I am compelled to judge as poetic greatness. ... No one now writing poems in the English language is likelier than Ashbery to survive the severe judgments of time. ... The book will be a major part of our imaginative history, and is an inevitable comfort in our current darkness.

References to Stevens were commonplace in early reviews of the Self-Portrait collection and, whether they reflected or rejected Bloom's interpretation, they demonstrated his influence in any case. Although Bloom raised Ashbery's profile, other critics have objected to his stewardship of Ashbery's reputation. In 1975, John N. Morris mocked the tone of Bloom's blurb as over-bearing and portentous, sarcastically calling him "solemn and tremendous as History Itself":

How very discouraging it sounds—another damned masterpiece! Good God! Will we never catch up? What's mainly wrong with utterances like Bloom's is their deterrent effect. I suspect that Ashbery in this book is pretty nearly as good as Bloom says he is, and I hope that the dustjacket drums and thunder won't put readers off.

In Susan M. Schultz's reading, Bloom's reviews imposed his own ideas and denigrated any of Ashbery's qualities beyond or contrary to his Stevens-centered analysis. Schultz interpreted parts of Ashbery's poetry, beginning with "Self-Portrait", as veiled retorts to Bloom and other literary theorists who would narrowly categorize the bounds of his work.

=== In academic literary journals ===
In The American Poetry Review, Fred Moramarco—a poet and professor of English at San Diego State University—wrote that he had long considered Ashbery to be "a poet to be reckoned with" and a "painterly" innovator who had become the poetry community's "own liberating version of Jackson Pollock". The new collection marked, for Moramarco, a "culmination" of Ashbery's work thus far. He praised the range of Ashbery's style, which he called "unparalleled among contemporary writers," and singled out the title poem for praise: "I don't regard it a very risky prophecy to suggest that this poem will shortly be regarded as a masterpiece, a classic of its genre, as elegant and erudite a poem as has appeared in this country in very many years."

Richard Howard, writing for Poetry magazine, cautioned that Ashbery's poetry contained "long, radiant visions, cross-cut by the usual ... opacities of diction and association" that the reader "may like or loathe, depending," but he said "[t]here is no choice, however, about the title poem, and half a dozen others, which are, as everyone seems to be saying, among the finest things American poetry has to show, and certainly the finest things Ashbery has yet shown."

=== In the popular press ===
Writing for Harper's Magazine, the writer Paul Auster described Ashbery's method as a reversal of "no ideas but in things"—a William Carlos Williams phrase that represented, in his opinion, "a widespread tendency in twentieth-century American thought and literature." Although Ashbery, like his peers, "begins with the world of perceived objects, perception itself is problematical for him, and he is never able to rely on the empirical certitudes that nearly all our poets seem to take for granted." Auster found Ashbery's "utter faithfulness to his own subjectivity" more similar to poetry by 19th-century French Symbolists, like Charles Baudelaire, Arthur Rimbaud, and Stéphane Mallarmé, than to poetry by his contemporaries. Overall, Auster said Ashbery's previous works had "all been rather uneven" and Self-Portrait was "no exception": a mixed bag of "exquisite successes" like the title poem on the one hand and, on the other, "many bad poems" and "far too many passages in which he exploits his sensibility to the point where it serves as little more than an excuse for ironic evasion."

Reviewing the collection for Time magazine in 1976, Paul Gray wrote:

Even Ashbery's staunchest defenders admit that his work is difficult. ... [He] manipulates words as if they were daubs of paint, interesting not for their meaning but for their coloration... This is the gaudy tightrope mode of Wallace Stevens, and few poets since Stevens have been able to escape the pit of arrant gibberish that yawns below. In his eighth volume, Ashbery once again proves that he can. What is striking in his poems is not the absence of simple semantic logic but the implication of a rationality that lies just out of reach. ... Ashbery's poems do not evade the real; they deny it the power to prevent other realities from being conceived.

== Awards ==
Self-Portrait in a Convex Mirror received three major literary prizes: the Pulitzer Prize for Poetry, the National Book Award for Poetry, and the National Book Critics Circle Award for Poetry. To date, Ashbery is the only writer working in any genre to receive a Pulitzer, National Book Award, and National Book Critics Circle Award in the same year. The achievement has often been described as the "Triple Crown" of American literature.

The National Book Critics Circle (NBCC)—at that time a two-year-old organization of 300 critics and editors—announced the winners of its first awards in January 1976. It marked not only the NBCC Awards' inaugural year, but the first American literary prizes awarded by a group of critics. The National Book Foundation announced its nominees for the National Book Awards in March; alongside Ashbery, the candidates in the poetry category were Richard Hugo, P.J. Lanka, John N. Morris, Leonard Nathan, George Omen, Carolyn M. Rodgers, and Shirley Williams. Ashbery was announced as the winner the following month. In May, Ashbery was announced as the winner of the Pulitzer. That year's jury—Anthony Hecht, Richard Howard, and Mark Strand—unanimously selected Ashbery, with Howard Moss, Howard Nemerov, and John Hollander on the shortlist. Hecht prepared the Poetry Jury's report to the Pulitzer Committee.

Given his earlier reputation as an inaccessible obscurantist, Ashbery was shocked by the accolades. The NBCC Award came as a "great surprise", he later said, though he was widely expected to win the Pulitzer months ahead of its announcement. Believing he could not possibly win both the Pulitzer and the National Book Award, he attended the latter ceremony. He later recalled that, after they announced his name, "I was caught in probably the only spontaneous photograph of me that exists."

== Effect on Ashbery's stature ==
The collection's acclaim made Ashbery one of the preeminent American poets of his generation. According to Paul Auster, few recent books of American poetry had "provoked such unanimous praise and admiration," which was perhaps surprising given the "singularly bad press" for Ashbery's earlier work. While he had been recognized by a small, "fanatically devoted" following, he was more often dismissed as "obscure, meaningless, and willfully avant-garde" by "the lords of the literary establishment."

The art critic Hilton Kramer remarked in 1977 that Ashbery had "been elevated to an astonishing public renown" in the two years since the publication of Self-Portrait in a Convex Mirror. Kramer was reviewing new portraits of Ashbery by his longtime friend Larry Rivers, who had previously drawn portraits of Ashbery in the 1950s. Unlike the older portraits of Ashbery, Kramer said, Rivers's new paintings were "not so much portraits of a friend as portraits of a famous figure," which celebrated the poet's newfound renown by including lines from "Self-Portrait in a Convex Mirror" and Ashbery's next collection, Houseboat Days, into the portraits themselves.

By 1984, David Lehman said that Ashbery was "widely considered America's most significant contemporary poet" and that, since Self-Portrait in a Convex Mirror, "this allegedly hermetic poet has won a genuine and genuinely avid audience for his work." Lehman reported that Self-Portrait in a Convex Mirror had by then sold 36,000 copies in hardcover and paperback editions. In 1998, Nicholas Jenkins of The New York Times described Self-Portrait in a Convex Mirror as the work that "fix[ed] him in the poetic firmament—a strange position for one so devoted to mobility and restlessness. From that point, even his best critics began to celebrate him in nakedly chauvinistic terms as part of an 'American' line, stretching back to the Emerson of 'Circles'."

Years later, Ashbery developed mixed feelings about the title poem of Self-Portrait, finding it to be too much like an essay and too remote in style from the rest of his body of work.

In March 2005, the Academy of American Poets included it in a list of 31 "Groundbreaking Books" of American poetry. (Note: The list has changed a few times since it first appeared online. It was originally part of the National Poetry Almanac, a project to publish 365 daily essays on Poets.org starting on April 1, 2004. See Academy of American Poets 2004. In March 2005, the project's final month, the site ran essays on 31 books "meant to showcase the masterpieces of American poetry that have influenced—or promise to influence—generations of poets" (see an archived version of the list as it appeared on May 29, 2005). By November 2010, the list was expanded to include eight more entries (compare archived versions of the list as it appeared on August 3, 2010 and November 28, 2010). It currently appears on Poets.org under the title "Classic Books of American Poetry". See Academy of American Poets 2005a and Academy of American Poets 2005b.) For National Poetry Month in 2014, the online culture magazine Flavorwire named it among the "50 Essential Books of Poetry That Everyone Should Read". Shortly before his 90th birthday in 2017, by which time he had written 28 volumes of published poetry, biographer Karin Roffman recommended "Self-Portrait" as one of the ten poems by Ashbery that newcomers to his writing should read first.

== Sources ==
=== Ashbery's writing ===
- Ashbery, John (November 18, 1972). "Voyage in the Blue". The New Yorker. p. 60 – via Condé Nast and the New Yorker Magazine Archives (subscription required).
- ——— (November 1973). "'Scheherazade'; 'As You Came From the Holy Land'; 'A Man of Words'". Poetry. 123 (2): 104–108 – via the Poetry Foundation and JSTOR.
- ——— (April 1974). "Grand Galop". Poetry. 124 (1): 1–8 – via the Poetry Foundation and JSTOR.
- ——— (August 1974). "Self-Portrait in a Convex Mirror". Poetry. 124 (5): 247–261 – via the Poetry Foundation and JSTOR.
- ——— (November 18, 1974). "Fear of Death". The New Yorker. p. 50 – via Condé Nast and the New Yorker Magazine Archives (subscription required).
- ——— (November 28, 1974). "Two Poems". The New York Review of Books. 21 (19). (subscription required)
- ——— (December 2, 1974). "City Afternoon". The New Yorker. p. 46 – via Condé Nast and the New Yorker Magazine Archives (subscription required).
- ——— (Winter 1974). "'Märchenbilder' & 'As One Put Drunk into the Packet-Boat'". The Georgia Review.
- ——— (January 20, 1975). "Worsening Situation". The New Yorker. p. 30 – via Condé Nast and the New Yorker Magazine Archives (subscription required).
- ——— (February 1975). "Absolute Clearance". American Review (22).
- ——— (April 3, 1975). "Mixed Feelings". The New York Review of Books. 22 (5).
- ——— (1975). Self-Portrait in a Convex Mirror: Poems (2009 redesigned ed.). Penguin Books. ISBN 978-0-14-058668-8 – via Google Books.
- ——— (1985). Selected Poems. Penguin Books. ISBN 0-14-058553-2.
- ——— (1987). "'Märchenbilder' (Winter 1974) and 'Whether It Exists' (Spring 1977)". In Lindberg, Stanley W.; Corey, Stephen (eds.). Keener Sounds: Selected Poems from the Georgia Review. The University of Georgia Press. pp. 7–8. ISBN 0-8203-0937-0 – via the Internet Archive (registration required).
- ——— (2008). Ford, Mark (ed.). Collected Poems 1956–1987. The Library of America series. Vol. 187. Library of America. ISBN 978-1-59853-028-5.
- Ford, Mark (2008). "Chronology". Collected Poems 1956–1987. By Ashbery, John. Ford, Mark (ed.). The Library of America series. Vol. 187. Library of America. pp. 993–1005. ISBN 978-1-59853-028-5.
- Kermani, David; Morrissette, Micaela; Rudegeair, Anni; Hendrix, Jenny; Briscese, Rosangela (2004). "Annotated Catalogue of the ARC Archive". Ashbery Resource Center – a project of The Flow Chart Foundation.

=== Bibliography ===
- Bloom, Harold (1979). "The Breaking of Form". Deconstruction and Criticism (1st ed.). Routledge & Kegan Paul. pp. 1–38. ISBN 0-7100-0436-2.
- Fischer, Barbara K. (2006). Museum Mediations: Reframing Ekphrasis in Contemporary American Poetry (2016 ed.). Routledge. ISBN 978-0-415-97534-6.
- Fite, David (1985). Harold Bloom: The Rhetoric of Romantic Vision. The University of Massachusetts Press. ISBN 978-1-55849-753-5 – via Google Books.
- Gelpi, Albert (2015). American Poetry after Modernism: The Power of the Word. Cambridge University Press. ISBN 978-1-107-02524-0 – via Google Books.
- Heinze, Rüdiger (2005). Ethics of Literary Forms in Contemporary American Literature. LIT Verlag. ISBN 3-8258-8536-4 – via Google Books.
- Herd, David (2000). John Ashbery and American Poetry. Manchester University Press. ISBN 0-7190-5597-0 – via Google Books.
- Hickman, Ben (2012). John Ashbery and English Poetry. Edinburgh University Press. ISBN 9780748644766.
- Lehman, David (1999). The Last Avant-garde: The Making of the New York School of Poets. Anchor Books. ISBN 978-0-385-49533-2 – via Google Books.
- MacArthur, Marit J. (2008). The American Landscape in the Poetry of Frost, Bishop, and Ashbery: The House Abandoned. Palgrave Macmillan. ISBN 978-0-230-60322-6.
- Miller, Stephen Paul (2010). "Periodizing Ashbery and His Influence". In Bloom, Harold (ed.). Bloom's Modern Critical Views: Contemporary Poets (New ed.). Infobase Publishing. pp. 31–54. ISBN 978-1-60413-588-6.
- Perloff, Marjorie (2001). "John Ashbery". In Riggs, Thomas (ed.). Contemporary Poets. Contemporary Writers Series (Seventh ed.). St. James Press. pp. 35–38. ISBN 1-55862-349-3. ISSN 1531-2240.
- Roffman, Karin (2017). The Songs We Know Best: John Ashbery's Early Life. Farrar, Straus and Giroux. ISBN 978-0-374-29384-0 – via Google Books.
- Ross, Stephen J. (2017). Invisible Terrain: John Ashbery and the Aesthetics of Nature. Oxford University Press. ISBN 978-0-19-879838-5 – via Google Books.
- Shapiro, David (1979). John Ashbery: An Introduction to the Poetry. Columbia Introductions to Twentieth Century American Poetry. Columbia University Press. ISBN 0-231-04090-3 – via the Internet Archive (registration required).
- Vendler, Helen (2005). Invisible Listeners: Lyric Intimacy in Herbert, Whitman, and Ashbery. Princeton University Press. ISBN 978-0-691-11618-1 – via Google Books.
- Vincent, John Emil (2007). John Ashbery and You: His Later Books. University of Georgia Press. ISBN 978-0-8203-2973-4 – via Google Books.
- Ward, Geoff (1975). Statutes of Liberty: The New York School of Poets. Palgrave Macmillan. doi:10.1007/978-1-349-22498-2. ISBN 978-0-312-09152-1 – via Google Books.
- Williamson, Alan (1988). "Robert Lowell: A Reminiscence". In Meyers, Jeffrey (ed.). Robert Lowell: Interviews and Memoirs. University of Michigan Press. pp. 266–273. ISBN 0-472-10089-0 – via the Internet Archive (registration required).

=== Academic and literary journals ===
- Ash, John (November–December 1985). "In Conversation with John Ashbery". P. N. Review. 12 (2). Archived from the original on December 3, 2016 – via pnreview.co.uk.
- Costello, Bonnie (Autumn 1982). "John Ashbery and the Idea of the Reader". Contemporary Literature. 23 (4). University of Wisconsin Press: 493–514. doi:10.2307/1207945. JSTOR 1207945. (subscription required)
- Howard, Richard (March 1976). "A Formal Affair". Poetry. 127 (6): 349–351. JSTOR 20597083 – via the Poetry Foundation.
- Miklitsch, Robert (Winter 1980). "Review: John Ashbery". Contemporary Literature. 21 (1). University of Wisconsin Press: 118–135. doi:10.2307/1207866. JSTOR 1207866. (subscription required)
- Moramarco, Fred (November–December 1975). "Ashbery's Self Portrait". The American Poetry Review. 4 (6): 43–44. JSTOR 27775114. (subscription required)
- Morris, John N. (Autumn 1975). "The Songs Protect Us, in a Way". The Hudson Review. 28 (3): 446–458. doi:10.2307/3849847. JSTOR 3849847. (subscription required)
- North, Charles (March 1, 1976). "Life in (Mis-)Prision: Reading John Ashbery" (PDF). The Poetry Project Newsletter. No. 33. The Poetry Project. pp. 1–5. Archived (PDF) from the original on July 15, 2019.
- Redmond, John (August 22, 1996). "Accidents of Priority". London Review of Books. 18 (6): 25–26.
- Schultz, Susan M. (Spring 1996). "'Returning to Bloom': John Ashbery's Critique of Harold Bloom". Contemporary Literature. 37 (1). University of Wisconsin Press: 24–48. doi:10.2307/1208749. JSTOR 1208749. (subscription required)
- Stitt, Peter A. (Winter 1983). "John Ashbery, The Art of Poetry No. 33". The Paris Review. No. 90. (subscription required)
- Zapruder, Matthew (August 14, 2017). "Unlocking the Unconscious Through Poetry". The Paris Review. Archived from the original on March 9, 2019.

=== Newspapers, magazines, and websites ===
- Anon. (April 14, 2004). "National Poetry Almanac". Poets.org. Academy of American Poets. Archived from the original on May 23, 2005.
- Anon. (March 2005). "Classic Books of American Poetry". Poets.org. Academy of American Poets. Archived from the original on May 29, 2005. Originally published as "Groundbreaking Books"; see archived link.
- ——— (March 2005). "Self Portrait in a Convex Mirror". Poets.org. Academy of American Poets. Archived from the original on December 28, 2005. Originally published as "Groundbreaking Book: Self Portrait in a Convex Mirror by John Ashbery (1975)"; see archived link.
- ——— (October 11, 2002). "Sale 1089 – Masterpieces of Modern Literature: Library of Roger Rechler – Lot 6". Christie's. Archived from the original on July 12, 2019.
- ——— (2014). "Modern American Poetry" (PDF). James S. Jaffe Rare Books LLC. Archived (PDF) from the original on July 25, 2019.
- ——— (March 27, 1976). "Candidates Named for Book Awards". The New York Times. Archived from the original on June 5, 2019.
- ——— (May 4, 1976). "Sketches of the Winners of the 60th Pulitzer Prizes in Journalism and the Arts". The New York Times. Archived from the original on July 6, 2019.
- Auster, Paul (November 1975). "Ideas and Things". Harper's Magazine. Vol. 251, no. 1506. pp. 106–110 – via the Internet Archive (registration required). Also available via the Harper's Magazine archive at harpers.org (subscription required).
- ——— (September 17, 1977). "Chaos and Beauty". The Saturday Review. pp. 34–37.
- Bloom, Harold (November 29, 1975). "On Poetry". The New Republic. pp. 24–25.
- Donig, Deb (September 7, 2017). "John Ashbery Changed My Life". Electric Literature. Archived from the original on July 13, 2019.
- Fraser, C. Gerald (January 9, 1976). "National Book Critics Circle Gives First Awards". The New York Times. Archived from the original on July 6, 2019.
- Gray, Paul (April 26, 1976). "American Poetry: School's Out". Time. Vol. 107, no. 17. pp. 95–98 – via the Time Vault (subscription required).
- Hartt, Frederick (July 16, 1950). "The Mystery and Magic of Artist Parmigianino". The New York Times. (subscription required)
- Hecht, Anthony (December 7, 1975). "Report of the 1976 Poetry Jury" (PDF). Columbia University. pp. 26–29. Archived (PDF) from the original on July 13, 2019 – via Pulitzer.org.
- Jenkins, Nicholas (January 4, 1998). "A Life of Beginnings". The New York Times. Archived from the original on June 5, 2019.
- Kakutani, Michiko (December 7, 1985). "Books of the Times; With Poetic License". The New York Times. Archived from the original on November 24, 2017.
- Kelley, Rich (October 2008). "The Library of America Interviews John Ashbery" (PDF). The Library of America e-Newsletter. The Library of America. Archived (PDF) from the original on July 13, 2019.
- Kindley, Evan (September 6, 2017). "How Should We Grieve John Ashbery?". The New Republic.
- Kostelanetz, Richard (May 23, 1976). "How to be a difficult poet". The New York Times. Archived from the original on December 29, 2018.
- Kramer, Hilton (November 6, 1977). "The Damaging Pressure to Be 'Original'". The New York Times. Archived from the original on June 5, 2019.
- Lask, Thomas (April 20, 1976). "National Book Awards Go to Ashbery, Fussell, Gaddis, Edmonds, Arlen, Davis". The New York Times. Archived from the original on February 14, 2018.
- Lehman, David (December 16, 1984). "The Pleasures of Poetry". The New York Times. Archived from the original on January 30, 2018.
- MacFarquhar, Larissa (November 7, 2005). "Present Waking Life". The New Yorker. Archived from the original on December 24, 2017.
- ——— (September 5, 2017). "The Gentleness of John Ashbery". The New Yorker. Archived from the original on February 7, 2019.
- Miller, Stephen Paul (October 20, 2017). "For Poets, There's No Such Thing as Bad Press". Publishers Weekly. Archived from the original on July 10, 2019.
- Orr, David; Smith, Dinitia (September 3, 2017). "John Ashbery Is Dead at 90; a Poetic Voice Often Echoed, Never Matched". The New York Times. Archived from the original on May 18, 2019.
- Roffman, Karin (June 16, 2017). "The 10 Best John Ashbery Poems". Publishers Weekly. Archived from the original on October 6, 2018.
- Smith, Dinitia (May 20, 1991). "Poem Alone". New York. pp. 46–52 – via Google Books.
- Temple, Emily (April 7, 2014). "50 Essential Books of Poetry That Everyone Should Read". Flavorwire. Archived from the original on July 26, 2019.
- Vinciguerra, Thomas (September 12, 2017). "John Ashbery, Poet, in All His Hunky Glory". The New York Times. Archived from the original on September 22, 2017.
- Wroe, Nicholas (April 22, 2005). "Parallel lines". The Guardian. Archived from the original on June 29, 2019.
