= Self-Portrait in a Convex Mirror =

Self-Portrait in a Convex Mirror may refer to:

- Self-Portrait in a Convex Mirror (Parmigianino), a c. 1524 painting by Parmigianino
- Self-Portrait in a Convex Mirror (poetry collection), a 1975 poetry collection by John Ashbery

== See also ==
- Hand with Reflecting Sphere (1935) by M. C. Escher, also known as Self-Portrait in Spherical Mirror
