= Lisa Bulawsky =

American contemporary artist

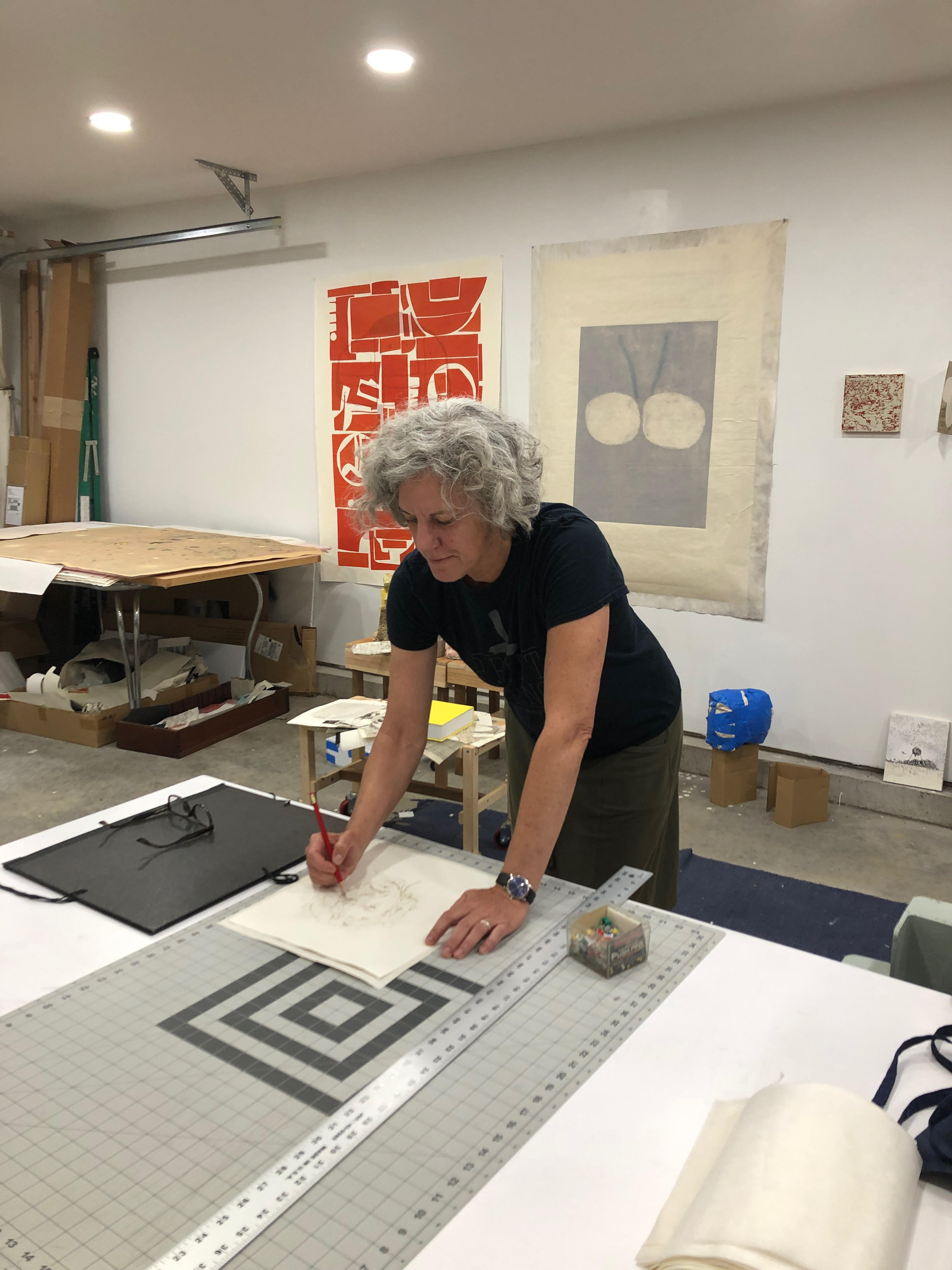
- Bulawsky in her studio

Lisa Bulawsky is a contemporary artist known for her works on paper, temporary public art, and printmaking.

== Education and career ==
Bulawsky received her B.A. in Studio Art from the University of California, Santa Cruz in 1989, a graduate certificate in Studio Art in 1990, also from the University of California, Santa Cruz, and completed her M.F.A. in Printmaking from the University of Kansas in 1995.

Bulawsky is a Professor of Art and, as of 2020, the chair of the MFA in Visual Art in the Sam Fox School of Design & Visual Arts at Washington University in St. Louis. She also holds the position of director of Island Press and is a founding member of the art collective Fifty-Fifty.

== Selected works ==
Lisa Bulawsky is known for her exploration of the philosophical implications of the mark, the matrix, and the multiple inherent in printmaking. Books featuring her work include Printmaking at the Edge, Printmaking: A Complete Guide to Materials and Processes, American Print Makers, and Disposable City. In 2013, the artist Nina Katchadourian visited with Lisa Bulawsky and they discussed the collaborative experience in a 2018 article published in Art in Print.

=== Work in permanent museum collections ===
Bulawsky's prints are in the permanent collection at the Nelson-Atkins Museum of Art, the Royal Academy of Fine Arts (Antwerp), the House of Humour and Satire in Bulgaria, and the Spencer Museum of Art.

=== Temporary exhibitions ===
Bulawsky also presents art in the public realm. In 2011, her prints "Four Chapters in the Present We Were" revealed people's responses to specific historical events: World War II, Assassination of John F. Kennedy, Apollo 11 landing on the Moon, and the September 11 attacks. Bulawsky participated in the 2016 show "Printmaking in St. Louis Now" which was at the Sheldon Art Galleries, a show that was reviewed by Art In Print who described Bulawsky's piece "New Paper Series". In 2018, Bulawsky presented "Portable Memories in Rising Seas" with Laurencia Strauss as part of her work with the Fifty-Fifty art collective. The show is a socially engaged, multi-media project about sea level rise that connects memory to climate change. Bulawsky has also presented "A Clearing of Measures" at the Eleanor D. Wilson Museum at Hollins University, "Terra Tumultum" for the Art in Odd Places festival, and in Florida State University's artist book press, Oyster Boat. In 2012 she participated in "Printwork (2012)", for which she won a second place Jurors' Award.

In the David Bruno Gallery, Bulawsky has presented solo artist shows, including "Everything is Still Happening" which was reviewed by the St. Louis magazine in 2018.

== Awards and honors ==
In 1996 she received a regional fellowship from the National Endowment for the Arts via the Mid-America Arts Alliance. Bulawsky was the Marvin Bileck Artist-in-Residence award at Bowdoin College in 2014, and the Francis Niederer artist-in-residence award at Hollins University in 2015. In 2021 she received an Artistic Innovations Grant from Mid-America Arts Alliance (M-AAA). Bulawsky has also been honored by Washington University with the Emerson Teaching Award in 2005, and as a distinguished faculty member in 2013.
