= Amelia Ishmael =

American artist, curator, music journalist, scholar, and teacher

- Occupations: Academic, art critic, artist, curator, editor, music journalist, radio producer, writer
- Known for: Visual art, music

Academic background
- Education: Kansas City Art Institute (BFA); Art Institute of Chicago (MA)
- Influences: Robert Walser, Jérôme Lefèvre, Kevin Muhlen, Shamim Momin

Academic work
- Discipline: Music journalism, art criticism, sociology, musicology
- Sub-discipline: Art history, contemporary art, black metal, feminism, history of photography, music theory, new musicology
- Notable works: Helvete: A Journal of Black Metal Theory "Black Thorns in the White Cube"
- Notable ideas: Black metal theory
- Website: www.ameliaishmael.com

Amelia Ishmael is an artist, curator, music journalist, scholar, and lecturer specializing in black metal, contemporary art, and art criticism. She received a Bachelor of Fine Arts in Photography and New Media from the Kansas City Art Institute and a Master of Arts in Modern Art History, Theory, and Criticism from the School of the Art Institute of Chicago. She has contributed to publications, including One+One Filmmakers Journal, Art in Print, Newcity, ArtSlant, Art Papers, Review, Art21, Cacophany, Becoming the Forest, and FNews Magazine. She is the co-editor of and a curator for the interdisciplinary journal Helvete: A Journal of Black Metal Theory, which specializes in black metal theory, and is the editor for the radio publication Radius. Her curated exhibitions include "Black Thorns in the Black Box" (with Bryan Wendorf) and "Black Thorns in the White Cube".

Ishmael first encountered metal music at the age of 14, when she was living in Florida. A friend from her art class introduced her to the band Six Feet Under, and shortly afterward another friend gave her a compilation of songs by Arcturus, Emperor, Cradle of Filth, Samael, and Pink Floyd. This piqued her interest in black metal, and when she relocated to Kansas City in the late 1990s she attended shows by the local black metal band Descension. During her undergraduate studies she created sound and multimedia art installations, basing many of them off of themes from the Odyssey. For her Master's thesis she wrote on black metal in contemporary art, work in which her installation "Black Thorns in the White Cube" was grounded. The piece explored how contemporary artists draw upon the languages, iconography, and narratives of black metal – what Ishmael calls the "mythology" of black metal. Reviewers, along with Ishmael herself, noted that some prior exposure to the black metal music scene was helpful for understanding the exhibition.

== Selected publications ==
- Ishmael, Amelia; Tallman, Susan (September–October 2012). "Stanley William Hayter—Essential Reading". Art in Print. 2 (3): 26–27. ISSN 2164-2702. JSTOR 43045415.
- Ishmael, Amelia (January–February 2013). "Tony Fitzpatrick: More American Etchings". Art in Print. 2 (5): 20–21. ISSN 2164-2702.
- Ishmael, Amelia (March–April 2013). "Review: NEW EDITIONS: Onsmith & Nudd". Art in Print. 2 (6): 26. ISSN 2164-2702. JSTOR 43045505.
- Ishmael, Amelia (September–October 2013). "Alain Biltereyst: Untitled". Art in Print. 3 (3): 43. ISSN 2164-2702.
- Ishmael, Amelia (December 2013). "On the 20th Annual Chicago Underground Film Festival" (PDF). One+One Filmmakers Journal. 2 (12): 12–23.
- Ishmael, Amelia (2014). Introduction. Transcendental Geology. By Bouschet, Gast; Hilbert, Nadine.
- Ishmael, Amelia (March 31, 2014). "An interview with Aldo Tambellini: going back again, forward… suspended in space, circular forms, broadcasting signals into spirals". Wavelengths. James Cohan Gallery.
- Ishmael, Amelia (July 1, 2014). "To Raise a Storm: Gast Bouschet and Nadine Hilbert's Tempestarii and the sympathetic magic of digital video" (PDF). One+One Filmmakers Journal. 1 (13): 32–41.
- Ishmael, Amelia (2014). Wilson, Scott (ed.). "Black Metal in the White Tower: Metal's Formless Presence in Contemporary Art" (PDF). Melancology: Black Metal Theory and Ecology. United Kingdom: Zero Books: 119–151. ISBN 978-1780991894.
- af Gennäs, Staffan Boije; Ishmael, Amelia (2014). "Mediating Darkness". J'ai Froid (4). Castillo/Corrales.
- Amelia Ishmael (2015). Introduction. The White People. By Ineke, Ibrahim R. Haarlem: Sherpa Haarlem. ISBN 978-90-8988-085-7.
- Ishmael, Amelia; Soliday, J., eds. (2016). EN3MY: 1550 N Milwaukee Ave., Third Fl., 2012-2005. Holon.
- Ishmael, Amelia (2017). Helle, Una Hamilton; Brown, Lotte (eds.). Here the repellent harpies make their nests. Het Bos Antwerpen. ISBN 9789090303468.
- Ishmael, Amelia; Ineke, Ibrahim (2017). II.

== Exhibitions ==
- "Black Thorns in the Black Box" (with Bryan Wendorf) - 2011
- "Black Thorns in the White Cube" - 2012
- "Prelude: The Breath of Charybdis" – 2013
- .blacK~SSStaTic_darK~fuZZZ_dOOm~glitCH. – 2013
- "The Night is No Longer Dead; it has a life of its own" – 2013
- "Prelude: The Breath of Charybdis"
- DIVINITUSSSANIMALUSSSACRÉUSSSORGANUSSS (with support by Michelle Puetz and Peter Margasak) – 2014
- "Eccentricities and Disorientations: Experiencing Geometricies in Black Metal" (with Elodie Lesourd) – 2015
- "Bleeding Black Noise" – 2016
- "I Am the Sun" – 2016
- "Only The Truth Disguised in a Dream" – 2019
