= Art in Print =

- Editor: Susan Tallman
- Categories: Art magazine
- Frequency: Bimonthly
- First issue: May–June, 2011
- Country: United States
- Based in: Chicago, Illinois
- Language: English
- Website: www.artinprint.org
- ISSN: 2164-2702

Art in Print was an international bimonthly art magazine and website devoted to the history and culture of the printed image. Its founding motto, purloined from Leo Steinberg, was “without prints you don’t understand the culture of the world,” The final issue of the magazine was published in 2019.

== Magazine and website ==
The Art in Print journal was published six times a year and covered the full range of printed art, historically and geographically, through articles, reviews and news reporting. It was distributed in both ink-on-paper and electronic formats; up to one-third of the content was accessible on the website without a subscription. The website also included an open-access calendar to print exhibitions, auctions, fairs, and competitions around the world; a comprehensive listing of research resources for artists, scholars and collectors; and a global directory of printshops, publishers and dealers. Art in Print also published a biweekly newsletter of new publications, exhibitions, competitions and other events.

The Art in Print Prix de Print was a competition run in every issue, in which an outside juror selected one of the entered works as the subject of a brief essay. While some winners have had substantial international reputations, others have been artists without any gallery representation. Jurors were drawn from an international pool of artists, curators and critics, and past winners have included Annu Vertanen, Isca Greenfield-Sanders and Victoria Burge.

In January 2015 the journal published the first work in a new commissioning program, Art in Art in Print, which invited an artist to design a work specifically for inclusion in the magazine. Scherenschnitt by Richard Tuttle is a two-sided print meant to be cut out from the page and considered as an extension of the artist's earlier etching installation Deep in the Snow (2015).

Since 2013, the website also hosted Sarah Kirk Hanley's INK Blog, formerly part of Art:21.

== Content ==
The journal published substantial articles; interviews with artists, curators and printers; and reviews of exhibitions, books and recent artists' editions. Subjects covered range from 17th century lift-the-flap anatomy engravings (Suzanne Karr Schmidt) to the impact of the Xerox machine on the aesthetics of punk (David Ensminger). Publications have included substantial monographs on the print work of contemporary artists such as Enrique Chagoya and Tauba Auerbach; interviews with Christiane Baumgartner and Wangechi Mutu; and the first English language publications on a group of mysterious French boxes lined with woodcuts (coffrets à estampe). Some issues contained a articles clustered around a single topic: September–October 2012 focused on the legacy of Stanley William Hayter; July–August 2014 examined screenprinting and the tension between art and design; January–February 2015 was billed as a topographic tour of Arcadia, from the 15th to the 21st century. Regular contributors to the journal included Catherine Bindman, Paul Coldwell, Faye Hirsch, Laurie Hurwitz, Andrew Raftery, Gill (Gillian) Saunders, and Amelia Ishmael.

== History ==
Art in Print was established following the 2009 closure of the previous American journal focused on prints, Art on Paper. Initially PDF-only, Art in Print added a printed magazine in early 2012.

A not-for-profit 501(c)(3) corporation, Art in Print received funding from the National Endowment for the Arts, the Dedalus Foundation, the Samuel H. Kress Foundation, the Malka Fund, and many others.
