= Victoria Burge =

American artist (born 1976)

- Born: 1976 (age 48–49); New York City, New York, U.S.
- Education: University of Massachusetts Amherst, University of the Arts
- Known for: Printmaking, drawing
- Website: Official website

Victoria Burge (born 1976) is an American visual artist, known for her work in printmaking and drawing.

== Biography ==
Victoria Burge was born in 1976 in New York City, New York. Her grandparents owned an art gallery in New York City's Upper East Side, where she spent time in childhood.

Her work is included in the collections of the Smithsonian American Art Museum, the Los Angeles County Museum of Art, the Philadelphia Museum of Art, the British Museum and the Metropolitan Museum of Art, New York.
