= Self-Portrait in a Convex Mirror (Parmigianino) =

Painting by Parmigianino

- Autoritratto entro uno specchio convesso (Italian)
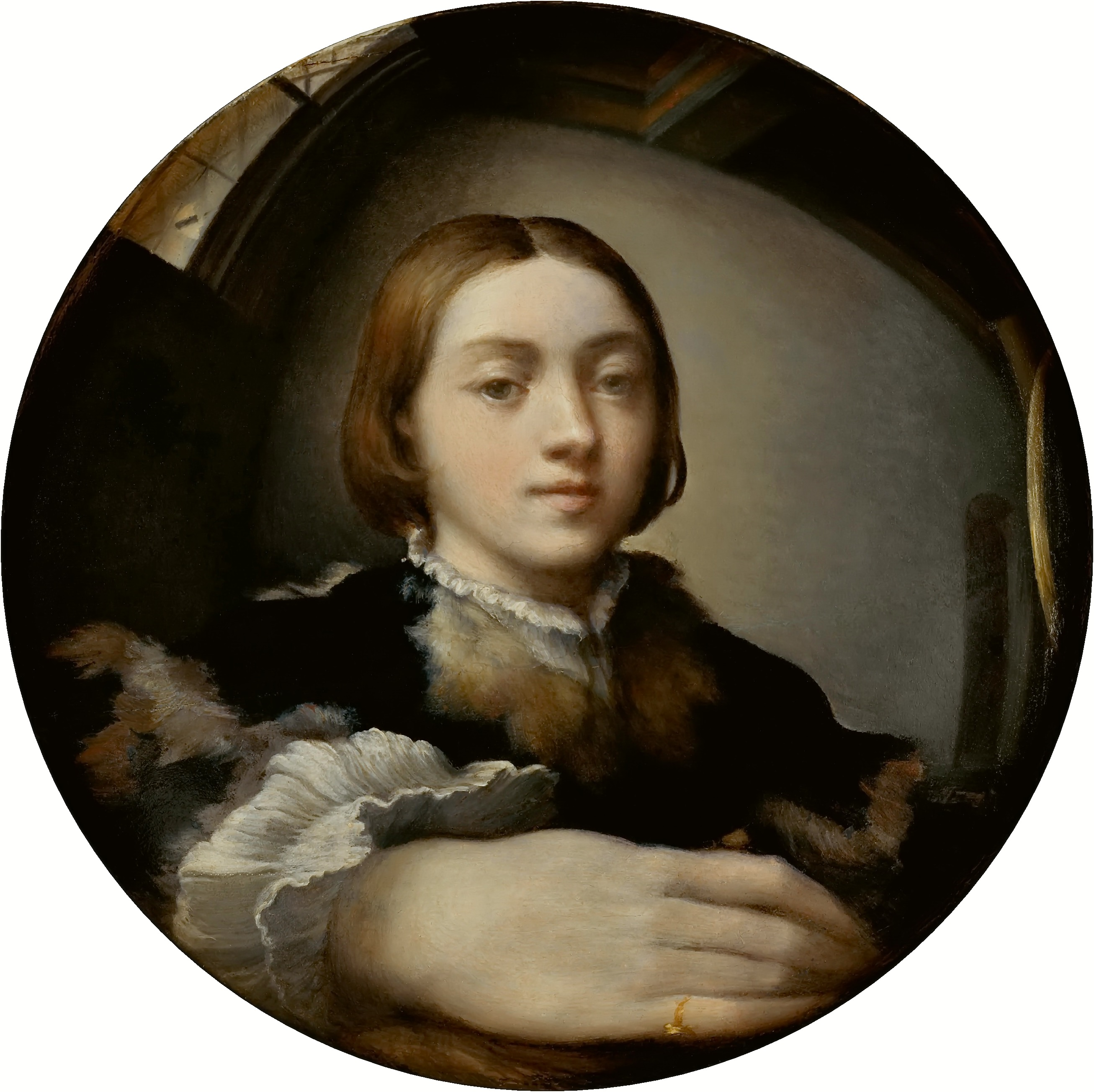
- Artist: Parmigianino
- Year: c. 1524
- Type: Oil on convex panel
- Dimensions: 24.4 cm diameter (9.6 in)
- Location: Kunsthistorisches Museum; Vienna

Self-Portrait in a Convex Mirror (c. 1524) is a painting by the Italian late Renaissance artist Parmigianino. It is housed in the Kunsthistorisches Museum, Vienna, Austria.

== History ==
The work is mentioned by Late Renaissance art biographer Giorgio Vasari, who lists it as one of three small-size paintings that the artist brought to Rome with him in 1525. Vasari relays that the self-portrait was created by Parmigianino as an example to showcase his talent to potential customers.

The portrait was donated to pope Clement VII, and later to writer Pietro Aretino, in whose house Vasari himself, then still a child, saw it. It was later acquired by Vicentine sculptor Valerio Belli and, after his death in 1546, by his son Elio. Through the intercession of Andrea Palladio, in 1560 the work went to Venetian sculptor Alessandro Vittoria, who bequeathed it to emperor Rudolf II. It arrived in Prague in 1608, and later it became part of the Habsburg imperial collections in Vienna (1777), although attributed to Correggio.

== Description ==
The painting depicts the young artist (then twenty-one) in the middle of a room, distorted by the use of a convex mirror. The hand in the foreground is greatly elongated and distorted by the mirror. The work was painted on a specially prepared convex panel in order to mimic the curve of the mirror used. "Along the very right edge of the composition the artist has even included an indication of the gilded wooden frame containing the portrait he is ostensibly working on, made visible by the acute angle of the mirror’s surface.... The sheen of the mirror is evoked in the lustrous tone of the artist’s forehead and right cheek; the texture of his garments by a range of brushstrokes.... As a support for the portrait, the artist even used a curved wooden panel that mimics the precise shape and size of the convex mirror he used to view his reflection".

== See also ==
- Self-portrait
- Self-Portrait in a Convex Mirror by John Ashbery: the portrait is the subject of a long poem in a poetry collection by Ashbery, both the poem and the collection of the same name. The book won all three of the major prizes awarded to collections by American poets.

== Sources ==
- Viola, Luisa (2007). Parmigianino. Parma: Grafiche Step.
