= One+One Filmmakers Journal =

Film magazine published in Brighton, England

One+One Filmmakers Journal was a printed and web-based film magazine published in Brighton, England. It was founded in May 2009 as One+One The Brighton Filmmakers Journal by seven members of the Brighton Filmmakers Coalition, but during 2009 and 2010 it became a separate entity to the Coalition and also dropped its Brighton title affiliation. It ceased publication in 2014.

The journal compromised essays, interviews and manifestos, and ran as a totally Not for profit project, printing a small run of A5 sized magazines distributed to cinemas, cafes and arts venues across the UK and a free to access website.

The journal was influenced and informed by radical politics, queer theory, the Avant garde and championed truly independent cinema. It accepted articles from open submission and expanded to include writers based internationally.

== History ==
Seven members of the Brighton Filmmakers Coalition began working on a small for-print journal to discuss ideas arising from their film projects in early 2009. They named the Journal "One+One" in recognition of Jean-Luc Godard's original and preferred title for his film "Sympathy for the Devil" which was renamed by studio producers. They launched their first issue in May 2009 with an event at The Redroaster Cafe, screening films from The Brighton Filmmakers Coalition's first ever filmmaker challenge.

The journal cut its affiliation with the Coalition in late 2009 and renamed itself to "One+One Filmmakers Journal" in April 2010. It began accepting submissions from writers worldwide and developed to become a more politically and philosophically engaged journal of ideas, beyond the mere emphasis on filmmaking. It launched its 4th issue with a debate on independent cinema at the Cambridge Film Festival in September 2010, and its 5th issue at the Brighton Film Festival in November 2010. This was followed by the screening and panel discussion "Revolutions in Progress" in December 2011 as part of the London Underground Film Festival, which featured contributions by filmmakers, activists and film theorists on the subject of revolution and radical filmmaking. In December 2012 the journal organised a film screening and round table discussion with porn theorists on contemporary understandings of the pornographic called "New Adventures in Pornography."

In December 2013, One+One screened Rosa Von Praunheim's 1970 classic film It's Not The Homosexual Who Is Perverse But The Society In Which He Lives, followed by a panel Q&A at the London Underground Film Festival.

One+One released its final issue - focussing on the themes of "Occult, Magic and Evil" - in October 2014. The archive of issues is available to view on Issuu.
