= Paul Coldwell =

English artist (born 1952)

Paul V Coldwell (born 1952) is an English artist.

== Biography ==
Born in Marylebone, London, he studied fine art at the West of England College of Art from 1972 to 1975 and then studied printmaking at postgraduate level at the Slade school of art 1975–77, where his teachers included Barto. Dos Santos and Stanley Jones. He was employed as research assistant at the Slade from 1978 to 1981.

He was appointed Subject Leader MA Printmaking at Camberwell College of Arts in 1997 and 1998 took over as project leader for a research project The Integration of Computers within Fine art practice developing his interest in the use of digital technology within Printmaking. He curated Computers & Printmaking with Tessa Sidey, for Birmingham Museums and Art Gallery 1999 and has further developed these concerns through an AHRC funded project The Personalised Surface within Fine Art Digital Printmaking.

In 2001 he was appointed professor at The London Institute (now The University of the Arts London). His curatorial practice includes Digital Responses for the V&A 2002–03 and Morandi's Legacy; Influences on British Art for the Estorick Collection London and Abbot Hall Cumbria 2006, which explored his long-term interest in this Italian artist. His interest in working with collections and other artists is further evidenced in the installation of his work in the house, Kettle's Yard, Cambridge, 2008 entitled "I called while you were out". In addition to his teaching and studio practice, he worked with Paula Rego on all her etchings between 1985 and 2005, including the Nursery Rhymes and Peter Pan. He wrote the catalogue Paula Rego Printmaker 2005 to accompany her travelling print retrospective and authored a chapter on her printmaking technique in Paula Rego-The complete Graphic work, TG Rosenthal, Thames & Hudson. His book Printmaking: A Contemporary Perspective provides a broad overview of the history of printmaking with a focus on contemporary approaches to both new and old print technologies.

Coldwell's practice embraces printmaking, bookworks and sculpture. He has exhibited widely, solo exhibitions include Kafka's Doll & other works, Eagle Gallery London 2007, Case Studies, London Print Studio and Queens Gallery, New Delhi, By this I mean… Arthouse Dublin, 1999 and Freud's Coat, Freud Museum London 1996. He has been selected to represent UK at the Ljubljana Print Biennial in 2005 & 1997, selected for the International Print Triennial, Cracow 2000, 2003 & 2006 and included in the exhibition Prints Now V&A London 2006. His bookworks include, Freud's Coat, With the Melting of the Snows (with text by the then BBC War Correspondent Martin Bell) and Kafka's Doll with text by the poet and author Anthony Rudolf. His work is held in numerous collections including Tate, Imperial War Museum, V&A, British Museum, Arts Council of England and New York Public Library.

He has contributed to numerous conferences and symposia, including as key note speaker at Reflections on Contemporary Printmaking, Portugal 2013, Impact 7 Australia 2011, Password, Lybijana 2014 and SNAP3 International Print Symposium. Kloster Bentlage/Germany 2015. He regularly contributes to the journal Print Quarterly (where he is on the editorial board) and Art in Print.

In 2013 Dr Ben Thomas curated a retrospective exhibition of his graphic work, Paul Coldwell A Layered Practice Graphic Work 1993–2012 staged at University of Kent and University of Greenwich.

Coldwell's work has often taken collections and archives as starting points. In 2013 as a result of researching at The Scott Polar Research Institute, Cambridge, he staged Re-Imagining Scott- Objects and Journeys and then in 2016 following research in London & Vienna, made work for a two person exhibition at the Sigmund Freud Museum, Vienna Setting Memory which was further developed into a solo exhibition at the Freud Museum London Temporarily Accessioned-Freud's Coat Revisited 2017.
