= Flow Chart (poem) =

1991 book by John Ashbery

- First edition
- Author: John Ashbery
- Language: English
- Publisher: Alfred A. Knopf
- Publication date: 1991
- Publication place: United States
- Pages: 216
- ISBN: 0679402012

Flow Chart is a long poem by the American writer John Ashbery, published in its own volume in 1991.

== Structure ==
Flow Chart is a work of 4,794 lines, divided into six numbered chapters or parts, each of which is further divided into sections or verse-paragraphs, varying in number from seven to 42. The sections vary in length from one or two lines, to seven pages.

== Reception ==
Scott Mahler wrote in the Los Angeles Times: "Ashbery's poetry has been called mysterious, original, difficult, dream-like, Romantic, a part of the continuum of American poetry that includes Walt Whitman, Emily Dickinson, Wallace Stevens and Hart Crane. It's also been called elusive, inauthentic, unmusical and overmannered. Flow Chart is easily all of these things... Ashbery has shown us again that he can go more than the distance we expect of great poets, but neither the terrain he covers nor the course he takes is altogether very exciting. Flow Chart is a great accomplishment, but it sometimes reads more like a big effort than a real tour de force."

The book was reviewed in Publishers Weekly: "Ashbery invents and reinvents his self in this book-length stream-of-consciousness poem. In manically articulate free verse of long, supple lines, he conjures a secular landscape dotted with shadows of ancient gods... Ashbery (Some Trees) weaves a haunted, haunting music around ... big questions, squeezing joy, ennui, despair, hope and a thirst for belonging out of ordinary experience.

Writing in Contemporary Literature, critic Nick Lolordo contends that Flow Chart is an "exemplary text" that points to Ashbery's central position in twentieth century poetry as an heir to T. S. Eliot and Wallace Stevens. Lolordo writes that Flow Chart

is both the most daily, most environmental of Ashbery's works and the most historical: it constantly contextualizes the momentary, by positioning the act of writing within different schemes of time (phenomenological, personal-autobiographical, historical) and space (central, marginal, peripheral).

== See also ==
- 1991 in poetry
- American literature

== Sources ==
- Lolordo, Nick (Winter 2001). "Charting the Flow: Positioning John Ashbery". Contemporary Literature. 42 (4). University of Wisconsin Press: 750–774. doi:10.2307/1209052. JSTOR 1209052.
- Mahler, Scott (1991-06-23). "An Amplitude of Ashbery". Los Angeles Times.
- "Fiction Review: Flow Chart: A Poem by John Ashbery". Publishers Weekly.
- Tankard, Paul (May 1997). "An Empty Gesture: John Ashbery's Flow Chart". Meridian. 16 (1): 33–46.
