= Darragh Park =

American artist (1939–2009)

Darragh Park (July 24, 1939 – April 17, 2009) was an American Artist, and the literary executor of the estate of Pulitzer Prize–winning poet James Schuyler. Perhaps best known for his book cover illustrations, Park painted landscapes as well as cityscapes in the style of Fairfield Porter. He was based in Bridgehampton, NY and his works were on exhibit at the Parrish Art Museum. and at the Guild Hall in East Hampton.

Darragh Anderson Park III was born in New York City to Darragh A. Park Jr. and the former Sally Mellon. His father was a founder and chairman of the Wall St. municipal bond firm of Park, Ryan Inc. His grandfather Darragh Park, Sr. was a banker in New York, and was married to Nona Park, owner of a well-known couture house who advised and supplied Jacqueline Kennedy

Mr. Park attended St. Mark's School, and graduated from Yale University with a degree in French literature with a minor in art history. He later earned a master's degree at Columbia University. He studied painting with artist Robert Dash and launched his own career as an artist, with his work garnering positive reviews in many art journals and shown extensively at Tibor de Nagy Gallery in New York City.

== Sources ==
- NY Times
- https://web.archive.org/web/20100603191955/http://eev2.liu.edu/ee0406/AW/artisthome.htm
- Obituary in East Hampton Star
