= Charles North (poet) =

American poet, essayist and teacher (born 1941)

Charles North (born June 9, 1941) is an American poet, essayist and teacher. Described by the poet James Schuyler as “the most stimulating poet of his generation,” he has received two National Endowment for the Arts Creative Writing Fellowships, a Foundation for Contemporary Arts Grants to Artists award (2008), four Fund for Poetry awards, and a Poets Foundation award.

Born in New York City, North earned his B.A. at Tufts University in 1962 (English and philosophy) and his M.A. at Columbia University in 1964 (English and Comparative Literature). In his mid-twenties, while copy-editing for a publishing company, he began writing poems, studied poetry-writing at The New School with Kenneth Koch, and became associated with the second generation of the New York School, in particular the poetry community at The Poetry Project, where he taught a workshop from 1975 to 1976. He is currently Poet-in-Residence at Pace University in New York City.

North's first poetry book, the innovative Lineups, was featured in two New York Post sports columns. He has since published nine books of poems, a book of essays on poets, artists, and critics (No Other Way), and collaborative books with the poet Tony Towle and the artist Trevor Winkfield. With Schuyler, he edited the poet/painter anthologies Broadway and Broadway 2, and with the poet Paul Violi he ran the Swollen Magpie Press from 1976 to 1982.

== Selected works ==
- What It Is Like. Turtle Point/Hanging Loose, 2011.
- Complete Lineups. Hanging Loose, 2009.
- Cadenza. Hanging Loose, 2007.
- Tulips (with Trevor Winkfield). Phylum, 2004.
- The Nearness of the Way You Look Tonight. Adventures in Poetry, 2001.
- New & Selected Poems. Sun & Moon, 1999.
- No Other Way: Selected prose. Hanging Loose, 1998.
- The Year of the Olive Oil. Hanging Loose, 1989.
- Gemini (with Tony Towle). Swollen Magpie, 1981.
- Leap Year: Poems 1968–1978. Kulchur Foundation, 1978.
- Elizabethan & Nova Scotian Music. Adventures in Poetry, 1974.
- Lineups. Privately printed, 1972.
