= Mark Ford (poet) =

British poet

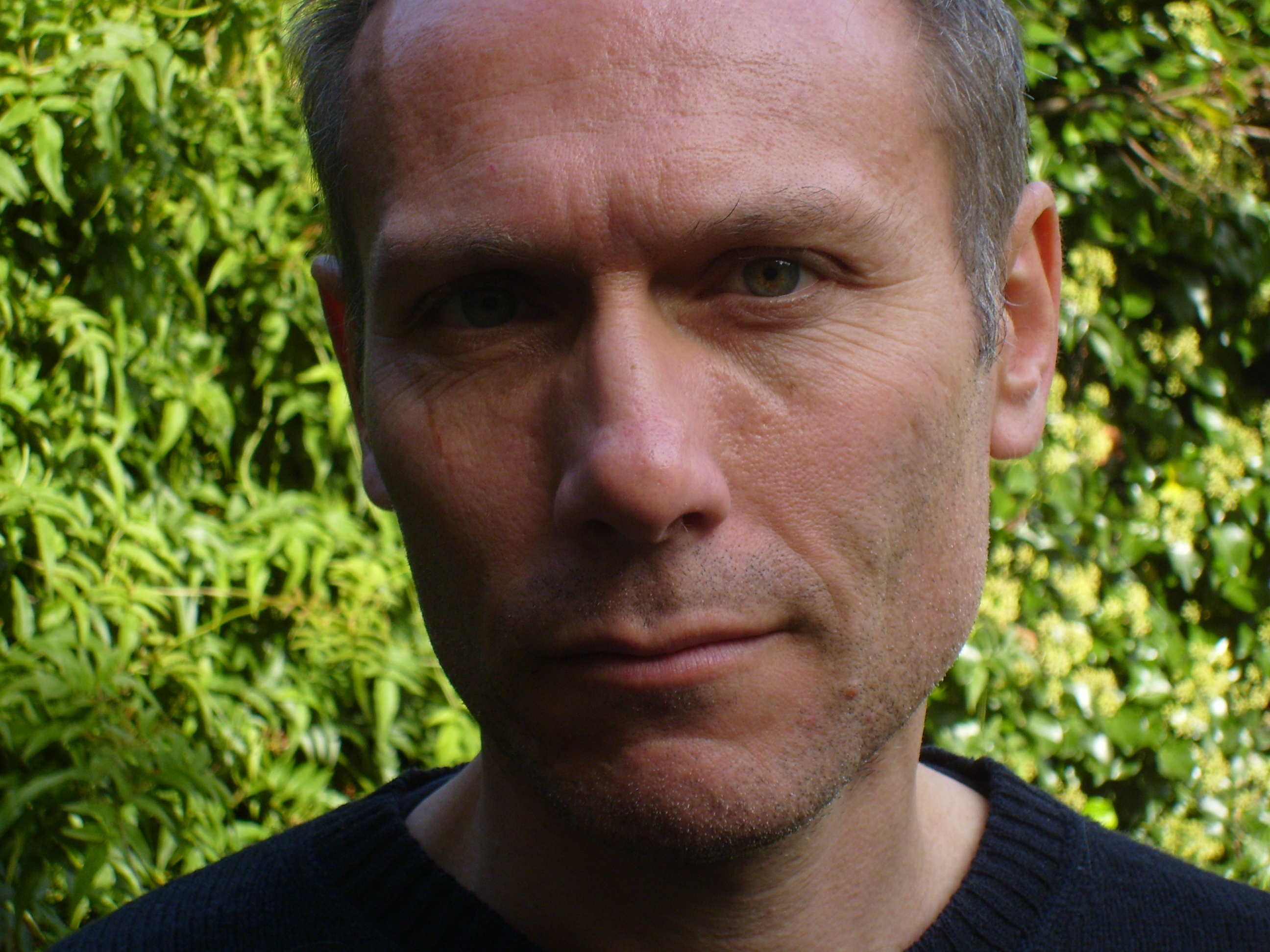
- Born: 1962 (age 63–64); Nairobi, British Kenya
- Occupations: Poet, academic, literary critic

Academic background
- Education: University of Oxford; Harvard University
- Alma mater: University of Oxford (BA, DPhil)

Academic work
- Institutions: University College London; University of Kyoto

Mark Ford (born 1962) is a British poet. He is currently Professor of English in the Department of English Language and Literature at University College London.

== Life ==
Mark Ford was born in Nairobi, British Kenya, on 24 June 1962 to Donald and Mary Ford. His father worked for the airlines BOAC, then British Airways. As a result, he had a peripatetic childhood, moving 'to a new country roughly every 18 months', accompanied by a 'sense of rootlessness or of not belonging'.

After school in London, he attended Oxford University, graduating in 1983 with a First in English Literature. He then studied at Harvard University as a Kennedy Scholar, before returning to Oxford to study for his doctorate, writing his thesis on the poetry of John Ashbery, supervised by John Bayley. After a number of years working as a lecturer in Oxford and London, he then moved to Japan, where he was Visiting Lecturer at Kyoto University between 1991-3.

Following this appointment, he worked as a freelance writer, principally reviewing poetry for The Guardian.

He is a regular contributor to The New York Review of Books, Times Literary Supplement, and the London Review of Books.

== Bibliography ==
=== Poetry ===
- Landlocked (Chatto & Windus, 1992; 1998)
- Soft Sift (Faber & Faber, 2001; Harcourt Brace, 2003)
- Six Children (Faber & Faber, 2011)
- Selected Poems (Coffee House Press, 2014)
- Enter, Fleeing (Faber & Faber, 2018)
- The Morlocks: A Fantasia (New Walk, 2025)

=== Prose ===
- Raymond Roussel and the Republic of Dreams (Faber & Faber, 2000; Cornell University Press, 2001)
- A Driftwood Altar: Essays and Reviews (Waywiser Press, 2006)
- Mr and Mrs Stevens and Other Essays (Peter Lang, 2011)
- This Dialogue of One: Essays on Poets from John Donne to Joan Murray (Eyewear Press, 2014)
- Thomas Hardy: Half a Londoner (Harvard University Press, 2016)
- Woman Much Missed: Thomas Hardy, Emma Hardy, and Poetry (Oxford University Press, forthcoming July 2023)
- A Guest Among Stars: Essays on Twentieth-Century Poets (Black Spring, 2024)

=== Translation ===
- New Impressions of Africa (Princeton University Press, 2011)
- A Monkey at the Window by Al-Saddiq Al-Raddi, parallel text, co-translated with Sarah Maguire (Bloodaxe Books, 2016)
- The Alley of Fireflies and Other Stories by Raymond Roussel, with an introduction and notes (The Song Cave, 2019)
- Jules Laforgue: Selected Poems (The Song Cave, forthcoming November 2023)

=== Editions and anthologies ===
- No Name by Wilkie Collins edited with an introduction, notes and bibliography (Penguin Classics, 1994)
- Nicholas Nickleby by Charles Dickens edited with an introduction, notes and bibliography (Penguin Classics, 1999)
- ‘Why I Am Not a Painter’ and other poems by Frank O’Hara, with an introduction and bibliography (Carcanet, 2003)
- Something We Have That They Don’t: British & American Poetic Relations Since 1925, with an introduction and bibliography, co-edited with Steve Clark (University of Iowa Press, 2004)
- The New York Poets: An Anthology, with an introduction and bibliography (Carcanet, 2004)
- The New York Poets II: An Anthology, co-edited with Trevor Winkfield, with an introduction and bibliography (Carcanet, 2006)
- Frank O’Hara: Selected Poems, with an introduction and bibliography (Knopf, 2008)
- Allen Ginsberg: Poems Selected by Mark Ford, with an introduction (Faber & Faber, 2008)
- John Ashbery: Collected Poems Volume 1, 1956-1987 with chronology and notes (Library of America, 2008; Carcanet, 2010)
- Mick Imlah: Selected Poems (Faber & Faber, 2010)
- London: A History in Verse with an introduction (Harvard University Press, 2012 (paperback, 2015))
- The Best British Poetry 2014 with an introduction (Salt, 2014, 192pp.)
- John Ashbery: Collected Poems Volume 2, 1988-2000 with chronology and notes (Library of America, 2017; Carcanet, 2018)

=== Miscellaneous ===
- John Ashbery in Conversation with Mark Ford (Between the Lines, 2003)
- And So It Goes: Letters from Young Mr Grace (aka John Ashbery) (PN Review, Vol. 44, no. 3, 2018, pp. 45–51)

=== Articles and essays ===
- ‘John Ashbery and Raymond Roussel’ in Verse (Vol. 3 no. 3, 1986, pp. 1–21).
- ‘Non Persona: The Diversity of John Ashbery’ in Scripsi (Vol. 8, no. 3, 1993, pp. 225–233).
- ‘Wanting to Go to Bed With Frank O'Hara’ in Scripsi (Vol. 9, no. 2, 1993, pp. 141–150).
- ‘A New Kind of Emptiness’ (on John Ashbery) in P.N. Review (Vol. 21, no.1, 1994, pp. 48–50).
- ‘Genius in its Pure State: The Literary Manuscripts of Raymond Roussel’ in The London Review of Books (Vol. 19, no. 10, 1997, pp. 19–21).
- ‘Inventions of Solitude: Thoreau and Auster’ in Journal of American Studies (Vol. 32, 1998, pp. 201–219).
- ‘A Wide and Wingless Path to the Impossible: The Poetry of F.T. Prince’ in P.N. Review (Vol. 29, no. 1, 2002, pp. 31–33).
- ‘Like a Lilly Daché Hat’ (on James Schuyler) in Poetry Review (Vol. 92. no. 3, 2002, pp. 55–62).
- ‘Elizabeth Bishop at the Water’s Edge’ in Essays in Criticism (Vol. 8, no. 3, July 2003, pp. 235–261).
- ‘Thomas Lovell Beddoes: Death’s Jest-Book’ in Poetry Review (Vol. 93, no. 4, 2004, pp. 52–61).
- ‘Elizabeth Bishop’s Aviary’ in the London Review of Books (Vol. 29, no. 23, 2007, pp. 20–22).
- ‘Uncollected, Unpublished, Unfinished’ (on the manuscripts of Mick Imlah) in Oxford Poetry (Vol. 13, no. 2, 2010, pp. 49–56).
- ‘Joan Murray and the Bats of Wisdom’ in Poetry (Vol. 203, no. 5, 2014, pp. 473–488).
- ‘Entropy with Doxology’ (on A.R. Ammons) in Poetry (Vol. 213, No. 4, 2019, pp. 390–402).
- ‘She Opened the Door: Thomas Hardy, Emma Hardy, and Poetry’ in Essays in Criticism (Vol. 70, No. 2, 2020, pp. 139–159, (F.W. Bateson Memorial Lecture)).
