= Contemporary Literature (journal) =

- Discipline: Contemporary literature
- Language: English
- Edited by: Thomas Schaub

Publication details
- Former name: Wisconsin Studies in Contemporary Literature
- History: 1960–present
- Publisher: University of Wisconsin Press (United States)
- Frequency: Quarterly

Standard abbreviations
- ISO 4: Contemp. Lit.

Indexing
- ISSN: 0010-7484 (print); 1548-9949 (web)
- LCCN: 64006922
- JSTOR: 00107484
- OCLC no.: 2244753

Links
- Journal homepage; Online access; Online archive

Contemporary Literature is a quarterly peer-reviewed academic journal which publishes interviews with notable and developing authors, scholarly essays, and reviews of recent books critiquing the contemporary literature field. Genre coverage includes poetry, the novel, drama, creative nonfiction, and new media (including digital literature and the graphic narrative). The editor-in-chief is Thomas Schaub (University of Wisconsin–Madison). It was established in 1960 as the Wisconsin Studies in Contemporary Literature, obtaining its current title in 1968.

== Abstracting and indexing ==
The journal is abstracted and indexed by:

- Arts and Humanities Citation Index
- Current Contents/Arts and Humanities
- Abstracts of English Studies
- Academic Search
- American Bibliography of Slavic and East European Studies
- Annual Bibliography of English Language and Literature
- Routledge Annotated Bibliography of English Studies
- Humanities Index
- Expanded Academic
- Humanities International index
- Scopus
