= Hotel Lautréamont =

Book by John Ashbery

- First edition
- Author: John Ashbery
- Cover artist: Joseph Cornell
- Language: English
- Publisher: Alfred A. Knopf
- Publication date: 1992
- Publication place: United States
- Pages: 157
- ISBN: 0679415122

Hotel Lautréamont is a 1992 poetry collection by the American writer John Ashbery. The title comes from the symbolist poet Comte de Lautréamont.

== Reception ==
Barbara Everett of The Independent described the language of the book as "dislocated, dehistoricised, only making meaning if treated as a purely verbal pleasure. Language used like this restricts itself to an excessively thin power of expression. At the precise point at which the reader might trust a poetic world or style, the poem changes gear." Everett continued: "The most intellectually classy of early Christian heresies was Gnosticism, which denied the real existence of bodies, or their importance (if they existed): Jesus may have been born, but he certainly didn't die. The post-modern feeling for language is similar: words may be written, but can't mean. The result in Ashbery's case is some interesting exercises du style. But real poems are being written in England, in Australia, the Caribbean and the US by at least a dozen English-speaking poets who are committed to a language that lives and dies."

== See also ==
- 1992 in poetry
- American literature
