= Chinese Whispers (poetry collection) =

2002 volume of poetry

- First edition
- Author: John Ashbery
- Language: English
- Publisher: Farrar, Straus and Giroux
- Publication date: 2002
- Publication place: United States
- Pages: 100
- ISBN: 0374122571

Chinese Whispers is a 2002 poetry collection by the American writer John Ashbery. It was Ashbery's 20th collection and consists of 65 individual poems.

== Reception ==
Jeremy Noel Tod of The Guardian called Ashbery "a great nonsense poet", and held forward similarities between his poetry and that of Samuel Foote, Lewis Carroll and Edward Lear. Tod grouped Chinese Whispers with Ashbery's last few collections, which he considered to also be concerned with time and old age, and wrote: "Although always oblique about the author's own life, these thick recent collections do feel like diaries. They are various, and they are of uneven quality. A more polished volume could have been compiled from about a third of the poems here. But it suits Ashbery to be prodigal and let the reader choose."

== See also ==
- 2002 in poetry
- American literature
