= The Tennis Court Oath (poetry collection) =

1962 volume of poetry

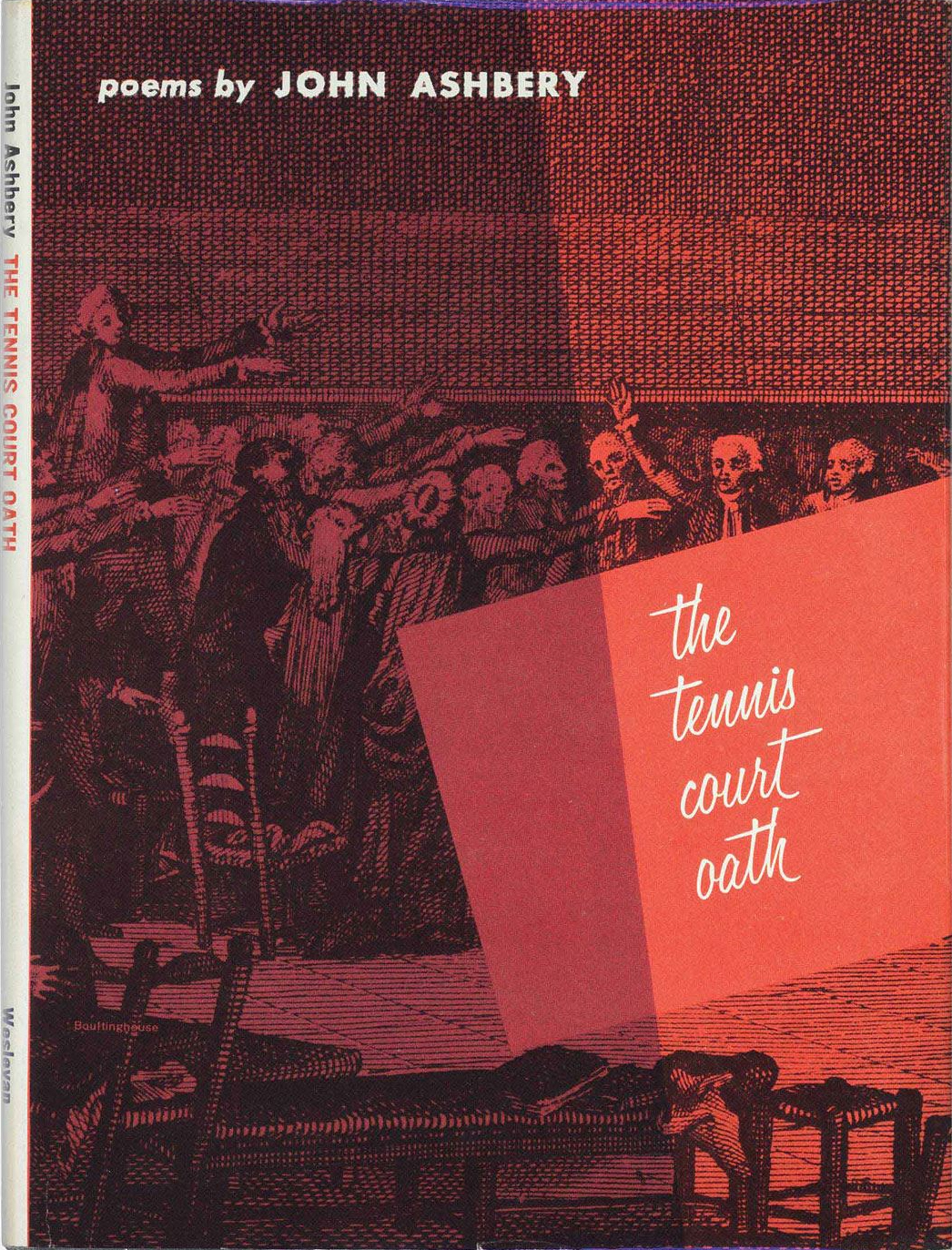
- First edition
- Author: John Ashbery
- Language: English
- Publisher: Wesleyan University Press
- Publication date: 1962
- Publication place: United States
- Pages: 94
- ISBN: 0819520136

The Tennis Court Oath is a 1962 poetry collection by the American writer John Ashbery. Ashbery lived in Paris when it was published, working as an art critic. The book received few and negative reviews upon its original publication.

== See also ==
- 1962 in poetry
- American literature
