= James Schuyler =

American poet

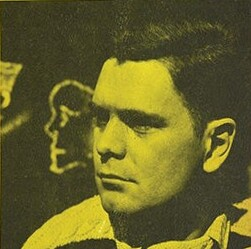
- James Schuyler, c. 1958
- Born: November 9, 1923; Chicago
- Died: April 12, 1991 (aged 67); New York
- Other name: James Schuyler Ridenour (1932-1947)
- Occupation: poet
- Awards: Pulitzer Prize for Poetry, Whiting Award, Guggenheim Fellowship

James Marcus Schuyler (November 9, 1923 – April 12, 1991) was an American poet. His awards include the Pulitzer Prize for Poetry for his 1980 collection The Morning of the Poem. He was a central figure in the New York School and is often associated with fellow New York School poets John Ashbery, Frank O'Hara, Kenneth Koch, and Barbara Guest.

== Life and death ==
James Marcus Schuyler was born in Chicago, the son of Marcus Schuyler, a reporter, and Margaret Daisy Connor Schuyler. His parents were divorced in 1931 and his mother married Berton Ridenour, a construction engineer. James Schuyler was known as James Schuyler Ridenour from 1932 to 1947, when he dropped his stepfather's name.

He spent his teen years in East Aurora, New York. After graduating high school, Schuyler attended Bethany College in West Virginia from 1941 to 1943, though he was not a very successful student; in a later interview, he recalled, "I just played bridge all the time."

Schuyler moved to New York City in the late 1940s where he worked for NBC and first befriended W. H. Auden. In 1947, he moved to Ischia, Italy, where he lived in Auden's rented apartment and worked as his secretary. Between 1947 and 1948, Schuyler attended the University of Florence.

After returning to the United States and settling in New York City, he roomed with John Ashbery and Frank O'Hara.

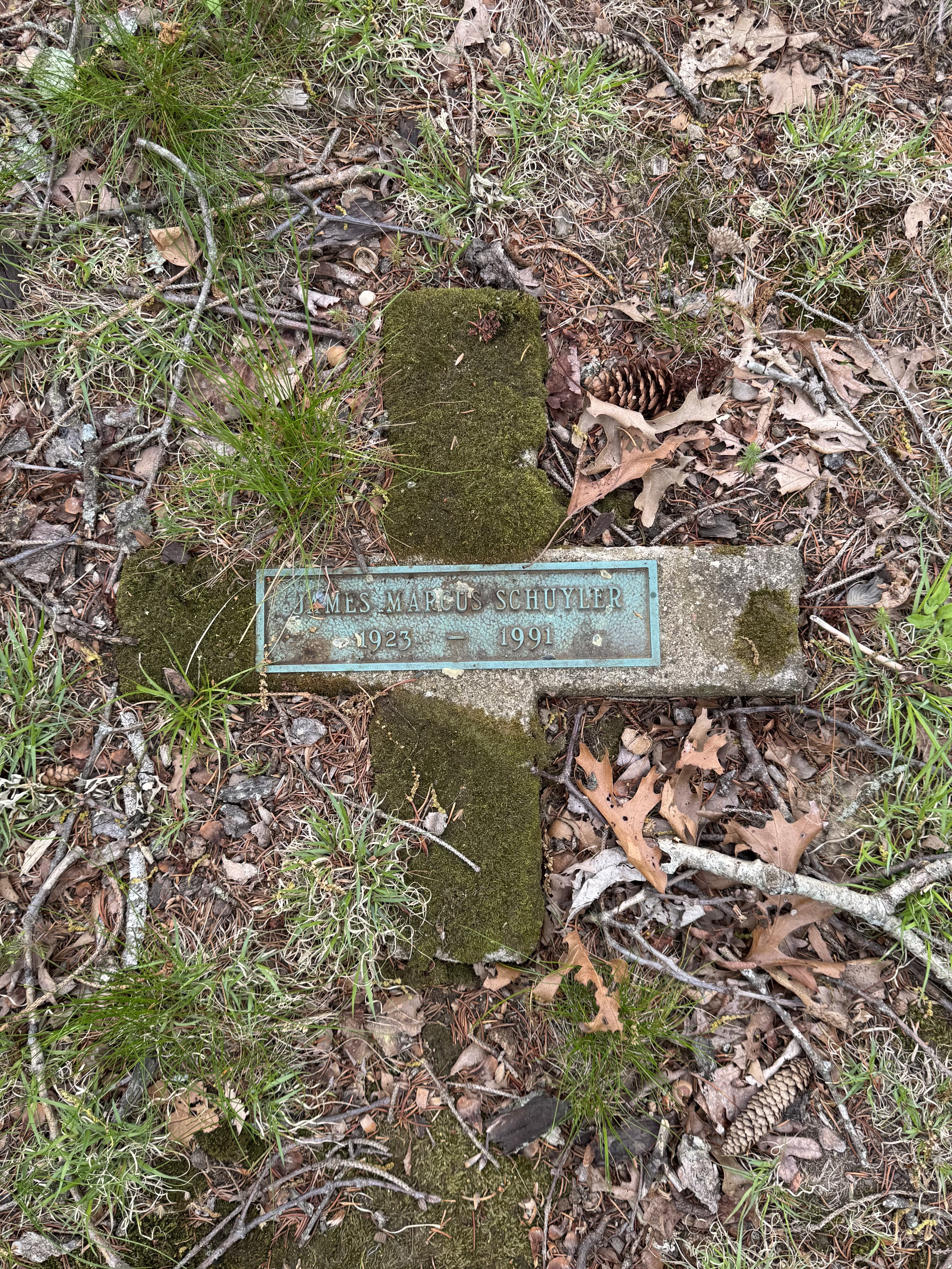
James Schuyler's grave in Mount Sinai, NY

In April 1991, at age sixty-seven, Schuyler died in Manhattan following a stroke. His ashes were interred at the Little Portion Friary (Episcopal), Mount Sinai, Long Island, New York.

== Personal life ==
Schuyler was not known for revealing much about his personal life. It is known that he was gay, and was partners with William Aalto and John Button. Schuyler was manic depressive, underwent several years of psychoanalysis and withstood many traumatic experiences. One of these includes a "near death experience" in a fire which he caused by smoking in bed.

In a spring 1990 special issue of the Denver Quarterly that was written by Barbara Guest in devotion to Schuyler's work, Guest refers to Schuyler as an "intimist," saying:

... for me Jimmy is the Vuillard of us, he withholds his secret, the secret thing until the moment appears to reveal it. We wait and wait for the name of a flower while we praise the careful cultivation. We wait for someone to speak, and it is Jimmy in an aside.

== Inspiration and style ==
Schuyler's move to Italy, as Auden's typist, was accompanied by his intention of writing. In 1981 he was said to have recalled "that he found Auden's elaborate formalism 'inhibiting'." This was likely an influence to his own "conversational style and proselike line".

While living in New York, Schuyler found inspiration in the art world. From 1955 to 1961, he was a "curator of circulating exhibitions at the Museum of Modern Art". He was also an editorial associate and critic for Art News. While working as an editorial associate, Schuyler wrote criticism about a large amount of art. In an interview that was published in spring 2002, he said, "I did learn an awful lot during those years, and then went on in the 60s writing occasional articles about specific artists and their specific strategies. Partly it was to make money, and partly because I wanted to write about painting, about art." His time as an art critic, then, became a major inspiration to his work.

From 1961 to 1973 Schuyler lived with Fairfield Porter and his family in Southampton, Long Island. Porter became an influence for Schuyler as well, and he dedicated his first major collection, Freely Espousing, to Anne and Fairfield Porter.

Schuyler is noted for his ability to take things that are "normal" and bring out their greatness. He takes a look at things that many people may not see, or care to take note of, such as individual raindrops. He evaluates the ordinary and the way it works in relation to other things: "It's the water in the drinking glass the tulips are in./ It's a day like any other."

Schuyler wrote an elegy for Frank O'Hara entitled "Buried at Springs". Schuyler recalls Ralph Waldo Emerson's transcendentalism, and uses nature to express himself in the elegy. Schuyler also has several works that are about, or that reference lists.

In his Diary, Schuyler says that he is "more of a reader than a writer", and "everything happens as I write".

== Awards ==
Schuyler received the 1981 Pulitzer Prize for Poetry for his 1980 collection The Morning of the Poem. He also coauthored a novel, A Nest of Ninnies, with John Ashbery in 1969. Schuyler also received the Longview Foundation Award in 1961, and the Frank O'Hara Prize for Poetry in 1969 for Freely Espousing.

Schuyler was a Guggenheim Fellow, a fellow of the American Academy of Poets, and a 1985 recipient of the Whiting Award.

His poem The Morning of the Poem is considered to be among the best long poems of the postmodern era.

== Published works ==
Numerous works by Schuyler, including books, plays, recordings, and other pieces have been published throughout the years. The following is a list of items that he authored.

=== Books ===
- Alfred and Guinevere (New York: Harcourt, Brace, 1958).
- Salute (New York: Tiber Press, 1960).
- May 24 or So (New York: Tibor de Nagy Editions, 1966).
- Freely Espousing (Garden City, N.Y.: Paris Review Editions/Doubleday, 1969; New York: SUN, 1979).
- A Nest of Ninnies, by Schuyler and John Ashbery (New York: Dutton, 1969; Manchester, UK: Carcanet, 1987).
- The Crystal Lithium (New York: Random House, 1972).
- A Sun Cab (New York: Adventures in Poetry, 1972).
- Hymn to Life (New York: Random House, 1974).
- The Fireproof Floors of Witley Court; English Songs and Dances (Newark & West Burke, Vt.: Janus Press, 1976).
- Song (Syracuse, N.Y.: Kermani Press, 1976).
- The Home Book: Prose and Poems, 1951–1970, edited by Trevor Winkfield (Calais, Vt.: Z Press, 1977).
- What's For Dinner? (Santa Barbara, Cal.: Black Sparrow Press, 1978).
- The Morning of the Poem (New York: Farrar, Straus & Giroux, 1980).
- Collabs, by Schuyler and Helena Hughes (New York: Misty Terrace Press, 1980).
- Early in '71 (Berkeley, Cal.: The Figures, 1982).
- A Few Days (New York: Random House, 1985).
- For Joe Brainard (New York: Dia Art Foundation, 1988).
- Selected Poems (New York: Farrar, Straus & Giroux, 1988; Manchester, UK: Carcanet, 1990).
- Collected Poems (New York: Farrar, Straus & Giroux, 1993).
- Two Journals: James Schuyler, Darragh Park, by Schuyler and Darragh Park (New York: Tibor de Nagy, 1995).
- Diary of James Schuyler (Santa Rosa, Cal.: Black Sparrow Press, 1996).
- Last Poems (London: Slow Dancer Press, 1999).
- Just the Thing: Selected Letters of James Schuyler, 1951–1991, edited by William Corbett (New York: Turtle Point Press, 2004).
- The Letters of James Schuyler to Frank O'Hara, edited by William Corbett (New York: Turtle Point Press, 2006).
- Other Flowers: Uncollected Poems, edited by James Meetze and Simon Pettet (New York, Farrar, Straus & Giroux, 2010).

=== Play productions ===
- Presenting Jane, Cambridge, Massachusetts, Poet's Theatre, 1952.
- Shopping and Waiting: A Dramatic Pause, New York, American Theatre for Poets, 1953.
- Unpacking the Black Trunk, by Schuyler and Kenward Elmslie, New York, American Theatre for Poets, 1964.
- The Wednesday Club, by Schuyler and Elmslie, New York, American Theatre for Poets, 1964.

=== Recording ===
- Hymn to Life & Other Poems, Watershed Intermedia, 1989.

=== Other ===
- "Poet and Painter Overture", in The New American Poetry, edited by Donald M. Allen (New York: Evergreen-Grove, 1960), pp. 418–419.
- Appearance and Reality: October Third to Thirty-first, 1960, introduction by Schuyler (New York: David Herbert Gallery, 1960).
- Robert Dash: November 11 – December 5, 1970, introduction by Schuyler (New York: Graham Gallery, 1970).
- Penguin Modern Poets 24, edited by John Ashbery (Harmondsworth, UK: Penguin, 1973) – includes poems by Schuyler.
- Broadway: A Poets and Painters Anthology, edited by Schuyler and Charles North (New York: Swollen Magpie Press, 1979).
- Broadway 2: A Poets and Painters Anthology, edited by Schuyler and North (Brooklyn, N.Y.: Hanging Loose Press, 1989).
- Four by Two magazine: in 2015 the international quarterly Four by Two magazine, in collaboration with Raymond Foye, ran a series of previously unpublished drafts of Schuyler's poems, some of them in uncorrected typescript.

=== Papers ===
The major collection of Schuyler's papers, covering the years from 1947 to 1991, is held in the Mandeville Department of Special Collections at the University of California, San Diego.
