= List of British conservatives =

Overview of conservatism in the United Kingdom

British conservatism refers to a political and philosophical tradition in the United Kingdom that emphasizes the preservation of established institutions, the rule of law, gradual societal change, traditionalism British Unionism, loyalism, euroscepticism, a free market economy, individualism and a strong belief in personal responsibility.

Along with liberalism and socialism, it is one of the major political ideologies in the UK.

Entries on the list must have achieved notability after the writing of Reflections on the Revolution in France which is often seen as the starting point of conservatism.

== People ==
=== Intellectuals, philosophers and historians ===
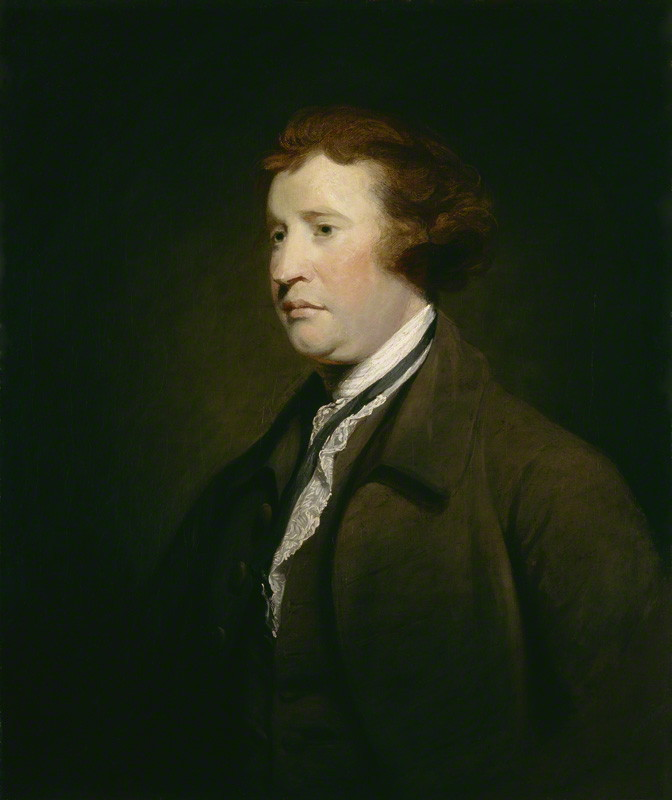
Edmund Burke in 1769

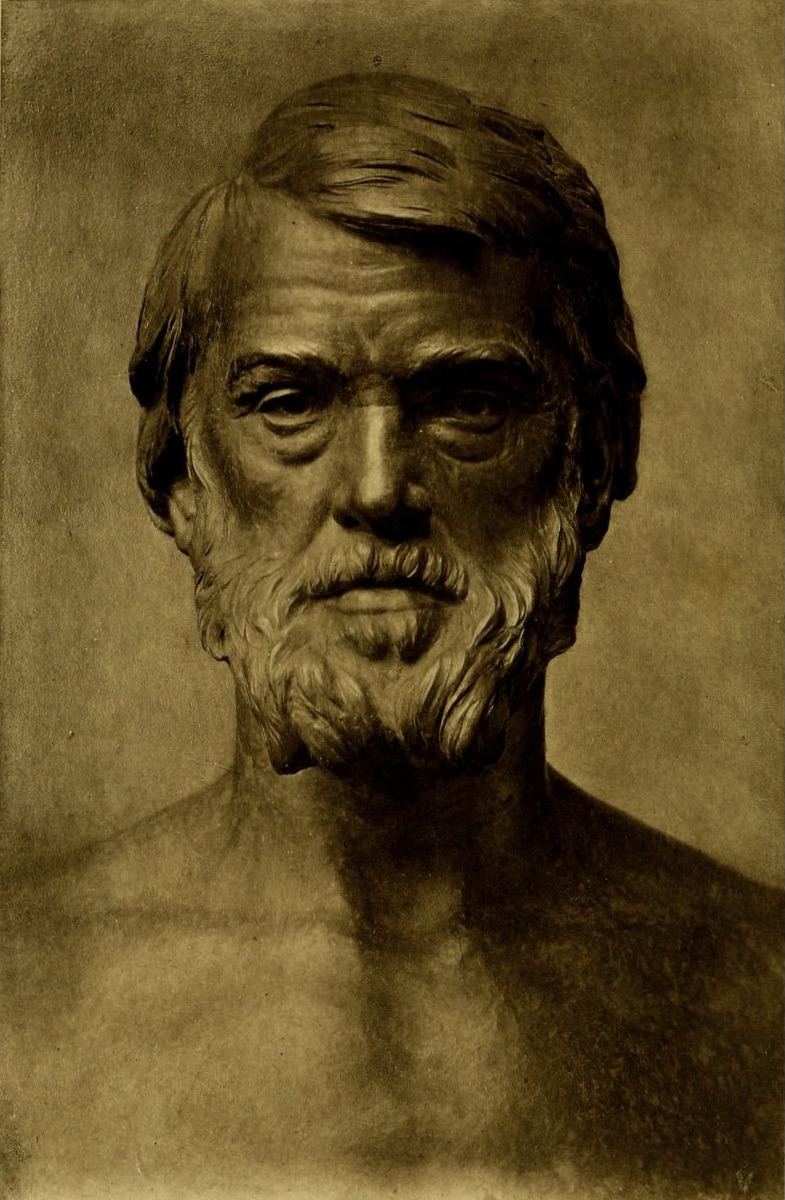
Bust of Carlyle in the Hall of Heroes at the Wallace Monument, 1891

Name	Lifetime	Notability	Ref.
Edmund Burke	1729–1797	Philosopher and statesman, generally understood as part of a liberal tradition, but sometimes associated with a 20th-century movement called modern conservatism	
Thomas Carlyle	1795–1881	Scottish essayist, historian, and philosopher	Philosophy of Thomas Carlyle
Henry Sidgwick	1838–1900	Philosopher and economist	
George Saintsbury	1845–1933	Literary critic	
F. J. C. Hearnshaw	1869–1946	British historian	
C. H. Douglas	1879–1952	British engineer, economist, and historian	
Nirad C. Chaudhuri	1897–1999	British Indian memoirist and cultural critic	
Friedrich Hayek	1899–1992	Political philosopher and economist	
Keith Feiling	1884-1977	British historian	
Christopher Dawson	1889–1970	Catholic historian and independent scholar	
Herbert Butterfield	1900–1979	British historian and philosopher	
Michael Joseph Oakeshott	1901–1990	Philosopher and political theorist	
Lord David Cecil	1902–1986	British historian and biographer	
Maurice Cranston	1920–1993	Philosopher and political scientist	
Maurice Cowling	1926–2005	British historian	
Antony Flew	1923–2010	Philosopher	
Anthony Quinton	1925–2010	Political and moral philosopher, writer, and metaphysician	
Renford Bambrough	1926–1999	Philosopher	
Paul Johnson	1928–2023	British historian	
Norman Stone	1941–2019	British historian and author	
Roger Scruton	1944–2020	Philosopher, writer, and social critic	
Anthony O'Hear	1942 –	Philosopher	
Stephen R. L. Clark	1945 –	Philosopher	
John Gray	1948 –	Philosopher	
Theodore Dalrymple	1949 –	Psychiatrist and culture critic	
Robert Tombs	1949 –	British-French historian	
Iain McGilchrist	1953 –	Psychiatrist and philosopher	
Andrew Roberts	1963 –	British Historian	
Niall Ferguson	1964 –	Scottish–American historian	
Phillip Blond	1968 –	Philosopher	

=== Politicians and office holders ===
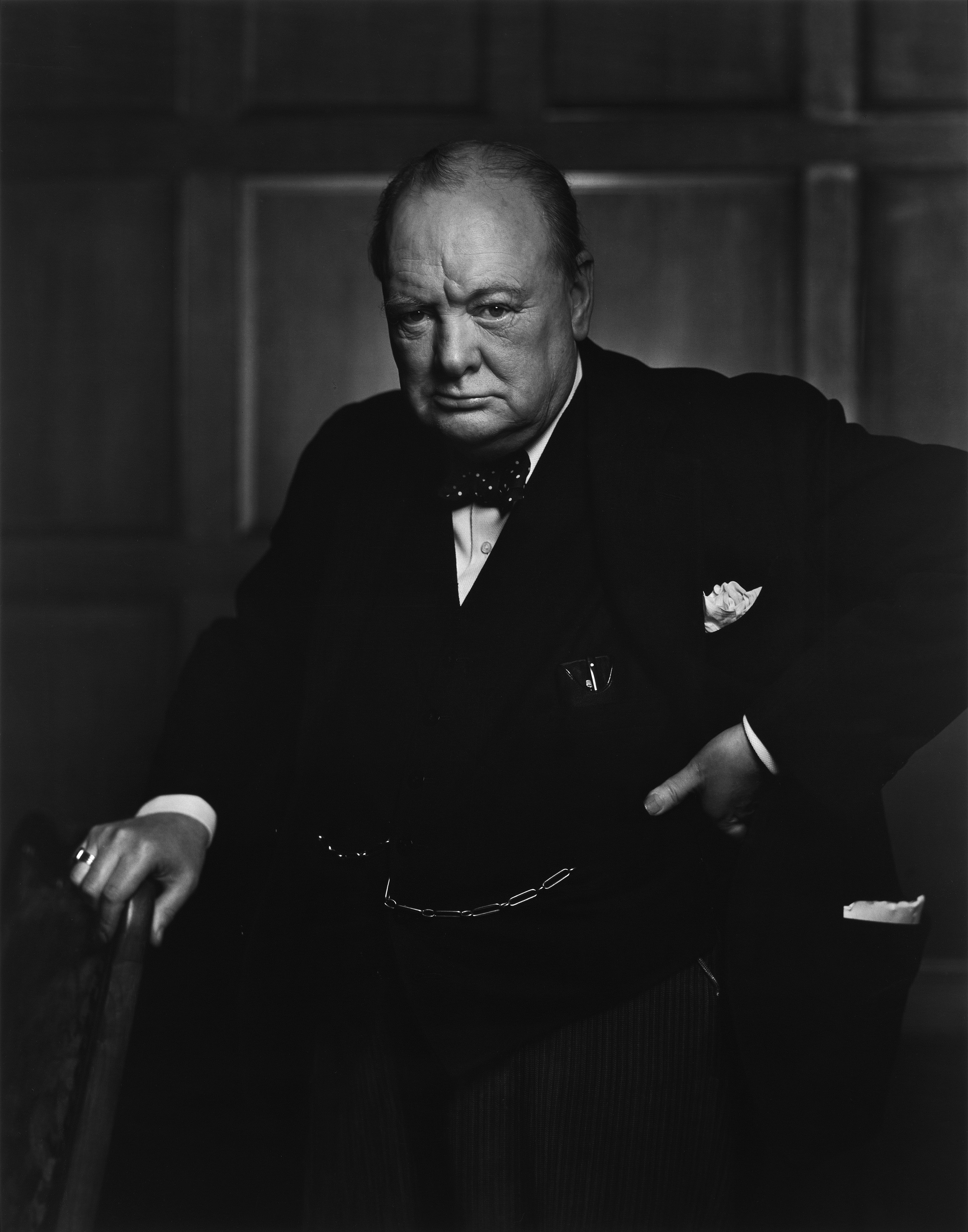
The Roaring Lion, 1941

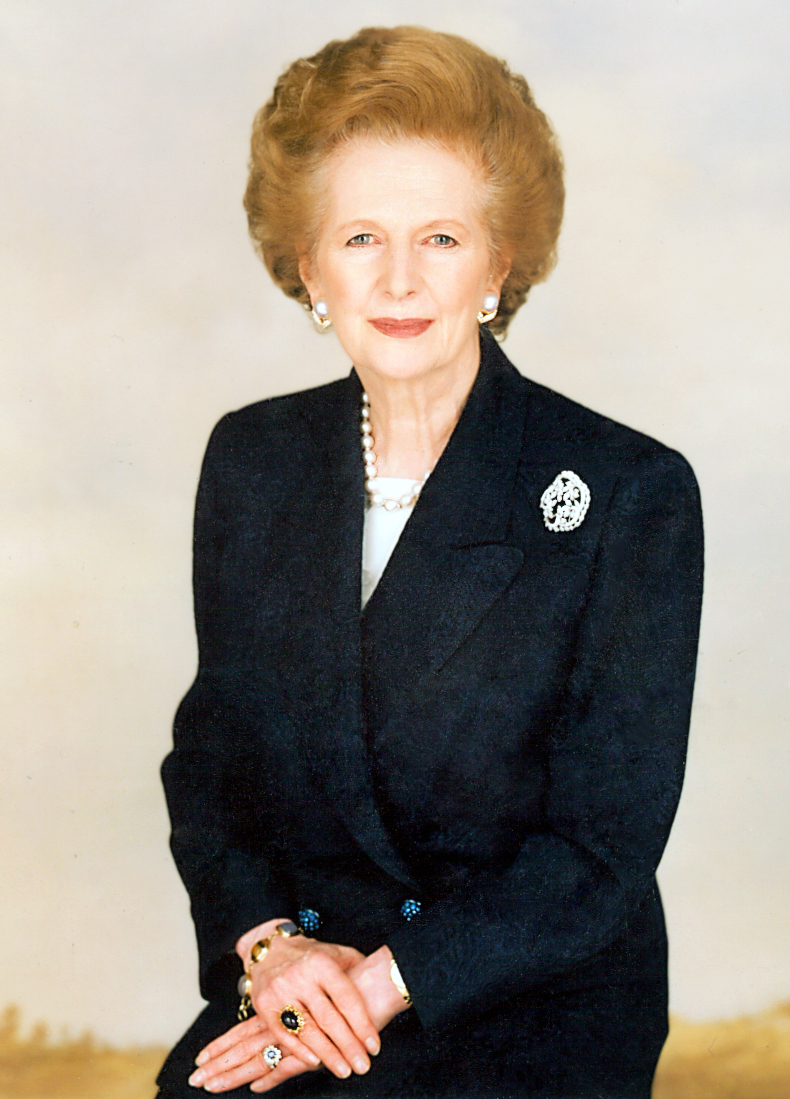
Margaret Thatcher in 1995

Name	Lifetime	Notability	Ref.
Prime Minister Robert Peel	1788–1850	Prime Minister of the United Kingdom from 1834 to 1835 and later from 1841 to 1846	
Prime Minister Benjamin Disraeli	1804–1881	Prime Minister of the United Kingdom from 1874 to 1880	
Prime Minister Winston Churchill	1874–1965	Prime Minister of the United Kingdom from 1940 to 1945 and later from 1951 to 1955	
Prime Minister Edward Heath	1916-2005	Prime Minister of the United Kingdom from 1970 to 1974	
Prime Minister Margaret Thatcher	1925–2013	Prime Minister of the United Kingdom from 1979 to 1990	
Prime Minister John Major	1943 –	Prime Minister of the United Kingdom from 1990 to 1997	
Prime Minister Theresa May	1956 –	Prime Minister of the United Kingdom from 2016 to 2019	
Prime Minister Boris Johnson	1964 –	Prime Minister of the United Kingdom from 2019 to 2022	
Prime Minister David Cameron	1966 –	Prime Minister of the United Kingdom from 2010 to 2016	
Prime Minister Rishi Sunak	1980 –	Prime Minister of the United Kingdom from 2022 to 2024	

=== Media personalities, journalists, broadcasters, publishers, editors, radio hosts, columnists and bloggers ===
Name	Lifetime	Notability	Ref.
T. E. Utley	1921–1988	British journalist and writer	
Peregrine Worsthorne	1923–2020	British journalist, writer, and broadcaster	
David Pryce-Jones	1936-2025	British author and commentator	
Auberon Waugh	1939–2001	British journalist and novelist	
Andrew Neil	1949 –	Scottish journalist, chairman and broadcaster	
Peter Hitchens	1951 –	Conservative author, broadcaster, journalist, and commentator	
Charles Moore	1956 –	British journalist and editor	
Allison Pearson	1960 –	British columnist and author	
Tony Gallagher	1963 –	British newspaper journalist and editor	
Piers Morgan	1965 –	Broadcaster, journalist, writer, and television personality	
Tim Davie	1967 –	British media executive	
Julia Hartley-Brewer	1968 –	British radio presenter, political journalist and newspaper columnist	
Fraser Nelson	1973 –	Political journalist and editor	
Isabel Oakeshott	1974 or 1975 –	British political journalist	
Camilla Tominey	1978 –	Journalist, broadcaster and news presenter	
Douglas Murray	1979 –	Author, columnist, editor and political commentator	

=== Painters, printmakers, fine-art photographers, visual artists and sculptors ===
Name	Lifetime	Notability	Ref.
John Constable	1776–1837	English landscape painter in the Romantic tradition	
Samuel Palmer	1805–1881	British landscape painter, etcher and printmaker	
George Richmond	1809–1896	Painter, portraitist and member of The Ancients	
John Everett Millais	1829–1896	One of the founders of the Pre-Raphaelite Brotherhood	
Wyndham Lewis	1882–1957	Painter, art critic and co-founder of the Vorticist movement	
L. S. Lowry	1887–1976	Mancunian painter known for his naïve artworks	
Walter Thomas Monnington	1902–1976	English Painter known for war painting	
Francis Bacon	1909–1992	Irish-born British figurative painter	
Gilbert & George	1942 – 1943 –	Collaborative performance art duo	
Tracey Emin	1963 –	English artist known for autobiographical and confessional artwork	

=== Composers, musicians and record producers ===
Name	Lifetime	Notability	Ref.
Edward Elgar	1857–1934	English composer best known for his orchestral works including the Enigma Variations and the Pomp and Circumstance Marches	
Bill Wyman	1936 -	Bassist of The Rolling Stones	
Errol Brown	1943–2015	British-Jamaican singer-songwriter and frontman of the soul band Hot Chocolate	
Jimmy Page	1944 –	Guitarist, writer and composer of the renowned hard rock band Led Zeppelin	
Roger Daltrey	1944 -	Co-founder and lead singer of the hard rock band The Who	
John Entwistle	1944–2002	Bassist of the hard rock band The Who	
Rod Stewart	1945 –	British singer-songwriter and vocalist of blues rock band Faces	
Eric Clapton	1945 –	Highly influential guitarist known for his solo work as well as being a member of blues rock band The Yardbirds and psychedelic rock band Cream	
Bryan Ferry	1945 –	Vocalist and principal songwriter of the art rock band Roxy Music	
Roy Wood	1946 –	Member and co-founder of rock bands The Move, Electric Light Orchestra and Wizzard	
Steve Winwood	1948 –	English blue-eyed soul singer-songwriter and member rock bands The Spencer Davis Group, Traffic and Blind Faith	
Lynsey de Paul	1948–2014	English singer-songwriter and producer	
Kenney Jones	1948 –	Drummer of the rock bands Small Faces and Faces	
Rick Wakeman	1949 –	Keyboardist of the progressive rock band Yes	
Mike Oldfield	1953 –	Prominent progressive rock musician	
John Lydon	1956 –	Lead vocalist of the pioneering punk rock band Sex Pistols and frontman of the experimental post-punk band Public Image Ltd	
Ian Curtis	1956–1980	Lead singer and lyricist of the prolific post-punk band Joy Division	
Mark E. Smith	1957-2018	Frontman and lyricist of the pivotal experimental post-punk band The Fall	
Jon Moss	1957 -	Drummer of the New Romantic group Culture Club	
Bruce Dickinson	1958 -	Frontman of the influential heavy metal band Iron Maiden	
Morrissey	1959 –	Frontman and lyricist of the important indie pop band The Smiths	
Tony Hadley	1960 –	Lead singer of the New Romantic group Spandau Ballet	
Gary Barlow	1971 –	Lead singer of the pop group Take That	
Kerry Katona	1980 –	Original member of the pop group Atomic Kitten	
Winston Marshall	1987 –	Banjoist and lead guitarist of the folk rock band Mumford & Sons	

=== Filmmakers, screenwriters, and producers ===
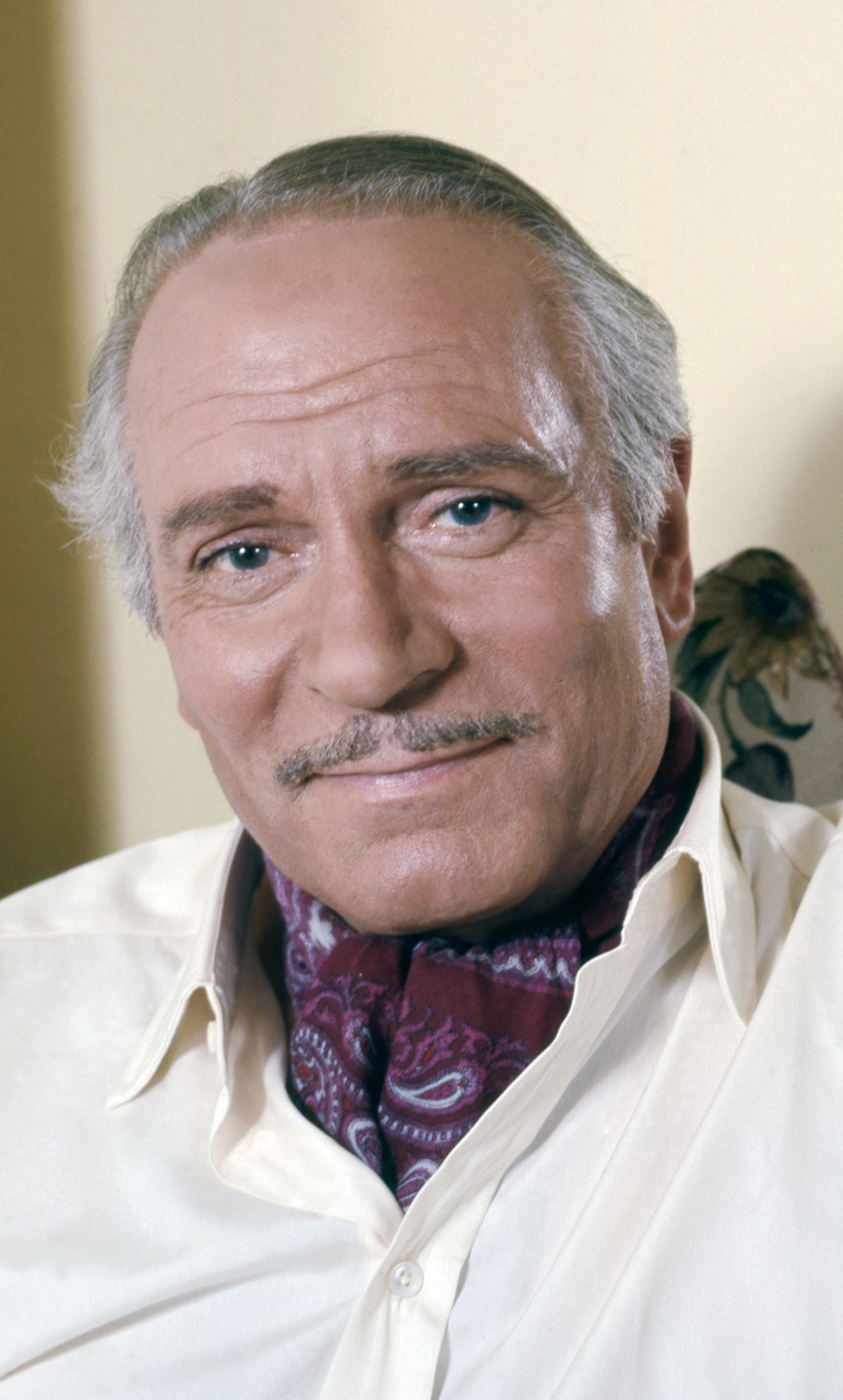
The son of a high church Anglican, Olivier was a lifelong Conservative. In 1983, he wrote to congratulate Margaret Thatcher following her victory in that year's General Election.

Name	Lifetime	Notability	Ref.
Noël Coward	1899–1973	Director and writer of films including In Which We Serve	
Laurence Olivier	1907–1989	Director and writer of films including Hamlet and Richard III	
David Lean	1908-1991	Director of films including The Bridge on the River Kwai, Lawrence of Arabia, Doctor Zhivago and A Passage to India	
Peter Glenville	1913-1996	Director of films including The Prisoner and Becket	
James Clavell	1921–1994	Writer for films including The Fly (1958) and The Great Escape; director of films including To Sir, with Love	
Peter Sellers	1925–1980	Writer and director of films including The Running Jumping & Standing Still Film and Mr. Topaze	
Bryan Forbes	1926–2013	Director and writer of films including Séance on a Wet Afternoon, King Rat and The Stepford Wives	
Antony Jay	1930–2016	Writer for shows including Yes Minister	
Michael Caine	1933 –	Executive producer of films including The Fourth Protocol	
Michael Winner	1935–2013	Director of films including Hannibal Brooks and Death Wish	
Terence Donovan	1936–1996	Photographer and director of music videos	
Tom Stoppard	1937–2025	Writer of films including Brazil, Empire of the Sun and The Russia House	
Julian Fellowes	1949 -	Creator and writer of Downton Abbey and The Gilded Age	
Gary Oldman	1958 –	Writer and director of films including Nil by Mouth	
Matthew Vaughn	1971 –	Creator, director and writer of films including Kick-Ass and the Kingsman franchise	

=== Novelists, poets and short story writers ===
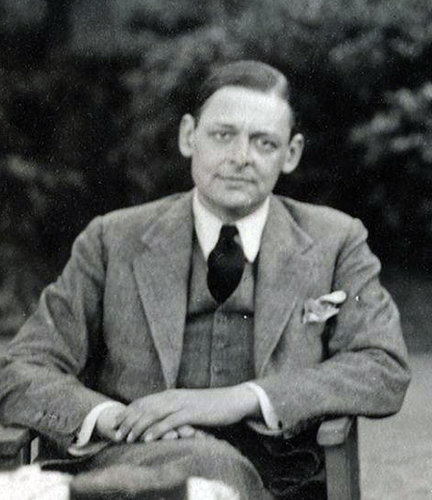
"And personally, I am, as you know, an old-fashioned Tory. So far we are in accord", T. S. Eliot wrote to Ford Madox Ford in 1923.

Name	Lifetime	Notability	Ref.
James Hogg	1770–1835	Author of The Private Memoirs and Confessions of a Justified Sinner and Jacobite Relics	
William Wordsworth	1770–1850	Author of Lyrical Ballads and The Prelude	
Walter Scott	1771–1832	Author of Ivanhoe and Waverley	
Samuel Taylor Coleridge	1772–1834	Author of The Rime of the Ancient Mariner and Kublai Khan	
Robert Southey	1774–1843	Author of "After Blenheim" and "Goldilocks and the Three Bears"	
John Clare	1793–1864	Author of Poems Descriptive of Rural Life and Scenery	
Edward Bulwer-Lytton	1803–1864	Author of Pelham, Vril: The Power of the Coming Race, and The Last Days of Pompeii	
Charlotte Brontë	1816–1855	Author of Jane Eyre and Villette	
Coventry Patmore	1823–1896	Author of The Angel in the House	
Lewis Carroll	1832–1898	Author of Alice's Adventures in Wonderland and Through the Looking-Glass	
Alfred Austin	1835–1913	Author of A Poem – To England	
Gerard Manley Hopkins	1844–1889	Author of "The Windhover" and The Wreck of the Deutschland	
William Hurrell Mallock	1849–1923	Author of The New Republic	
Mary Augusta Ward	1851–1920	Author of Robert Elsmere, Marcella, and The Marriage of William Ashe	
Robert Louis Stevenson	1850–1894	Author of Treasure Island, A Child's Garden of Verses, Kidnapped and Strange Case of Dr Jekyll and Mr Hyde	
H. Rider Haggard	1856–1825	Author of King Solomon's Mines and She: A History of Adventure	
George Gissing	1857–1903	Author of The Nether World, New Grub Street and The Odd Women	
Joseph Conrad	1857–1924	Author of Heart of Darkness and Nostromo	
Arthur Conan Doyle	1859–1930	Creator of Canon of Sherlock Holmes and The Lost World	
W. W. Jacobs	1863–1943	Author of The Lady of the Barge including The Monkey's Paw	
Arthur Machen	1863–1947	Author of The Great God Pan	
Rudyard Kipling	1865–1936	Nobel Laureate author of The Jungle Book duology, Kim and Just So Stories	
Saki	1870–1916	Author of The Westminster Alice and When William Came	
Lord Alfred Douglas	1870–1945	Author of The City of the Soul and The Duke of Berwick	
Robert Hugh Benson	1871–1914	Author of Lord of the World and Come Rack! Come Rope!	
Ford Madox Ford	1873–1939	Author of The Good Soldier and the Parade's End tetralogy	
G. K. Chesterton	1874–1934	Author of The Napoleon of Notting Hill, The Everlasting Man and the Father Brown stories	
John Buchan	1875-1940	Author of The Thirty-Nine Steps	
John Hay Beith	1876–1952	Author of Pip, A Safety Match and The Midshipmaid under the pen name Ian Hay	
Lord Dunsany	1878–1957	Author of The King of Elfland's Daughter and The Gods of Pegāna	
Radclyffe Hall	1880–1943	Author of The Well of Loneliness	
T. E. Hulme	1883–1917	Author of "Autumn" and "A City Sunset", both published in 1909 in a Poets' Club anthology, have the distinction of being the first Imagist poems.	
Gerald Gardner	1884–1964	Author of A Goddess Arrives and High Magic's Aid	
D. H. Lawrence	1885–1930	Author of The White Peacock, Sons and Lovers, The Rainbow and Lady Chatterley's Lover	
T. S. Eliot	1888–1965	Author of The Love Song of J. Alfred Prufrock, The Waste Land, The Hollow Men and Four Quartets	
Dion Fortune	1890–1946	Author of The Winged Bull and The Sea Priestess	
Agatha Christie	1890–1976	Author of Murder on the Orient Express, The Murder of Roger Ackroyd, Death on the Nile and The Murder at the Vicarage	
Vita Sackville-West	1892–1962	Author of The Land, The Edwardians, and All Passion Spent	
J. R. R. Tolkien	1892–1973	Author of The Lord of the Rings and The Hobbit	
Dennis Wheatley	1897–1977	Author of The Forbidden Territory and The Devil Rides Out	
Elizabeth Bowen	1899–1973	Author of The Last September, The House in Paris, The Death of the Heart, The Heat of the Day and Eva Trout	
Barbara Cartland	1901–2000	Author of A Ghost in Monte Carlo	
Lady Eleanor Smith	1902–1945	Author of the Red Wagon and Caravan	
Evelyn Waugh	1903–1966	Author of the Decline and Fall , A Handful of Dust, Brideshead Revisited, and the Sword of Honour trilogy	
Ian Fleming	1908–1964	Author of the James Bond series	
Henry Green	1905–1973	Author of Living, Party Going, and Loving	
Anthony Powell	1905-2000	Author of the 12-volume roman-fleuve A Dance to the Music of Time	
John Betjeman	1906-1984	Poet Laureate and author of Continual Dew	
Lawrence Durrell	1912–1990	Author of The Alexandria Quartet	
Roald Dahl	1916-1990	Author of Charlie and the Chocolate Factory and Fantastic Mr Fox	
Anthony Burgess	1917–1993	Author of The Malayan Trilogy and A Clockwork Orange	
P. D. James	1920–2014	Author of the Adam Dalgliesh mysteries, An Unsuitable Job for a Woman and The Children of Men	
John Braine	1922–1986	Author of Room at the Top	
Kingsley Amis	1922–1995	Author of Lucky Jim, Jake's Thing and The Old Devils	
Philip Larkin	1922–1985	Author of The Whitsun Weddings and High Windows	
James Moffat	1922–1993	Author of Skinhead	
George MacDonald Fraser	1925–2008	Author of The Flashman Papers	
Simon Raven	1927-2001	Author of the Alms for Oblivion series	
John Osborne	1929-1994	Author of Look Back in Anger	
J. G. Ballard	1930–2009	Author of The Atrocity Exhibition, Crash and High-Rise	
Geoffrey Hill	1932–2016	Author of For the Unfallen	
V. S. Naipaul	1932–2018	Nobel Laureate author of the A House for Mr Biswas, In a Free State, A Bend in the River and The Enigma of Arrival	
Jilly Cooper	1937–2025	Author of the Rutshire Chronicles including Riders, Rivals and The Man Who Made Husbands Jealous	
Frederick Forsyth	1938–2025	Author of The Day of the Jackal, The Dogs of War and The Fist of God	
Allan Massie	1938–2026	Author of Augustus and Tiberius	
Ferdinand Mount	1939 –	Author of A Chronicle of Modern Twilight	
Michael Dobbs	1948 –	Author of House of Cards	
Paul Kingsnorth	1972 –	Author of The Wake	

== Media ==
Name	Founded/defunct	Notability	Ref.
The Times	1785 –	British daily national newspaper based in London that is widely considered to be the newspaper of record along with The Daily Telegraph	
The Sunday Times	1821 –	British Sunday newspaper whose circulation makes it the largest in Britain's quality press market category	
The Spectator	1828 –	Conservative news magazine first published in July 1828 making it the oldest surviving weekly magazine in the world	
The Daily Telegraph	1855 –	British daily conservative broadsheet newspaper founded by Arthur B. Sleigh which is often regarded as the paper of record newspaper of record together with The Times	

== See also ==
- List of American conservatives

== Footnotes ==
1. "Tory Democracy". Dictionary. Merriam-Webster.
2. Ball, Stuart (2013). Portrait of a Party: The Conservative Party in Britain 1918–1945. Oxford: Oxford University Press. p. 74.
3. David Dutton, "Unionist Politics and the aftermath of the General Election of 1906: A Reassessment." Historical Journal 22#4 (1979): 861–76.
4. Georgiou, Christakis (April 2017). "British Capitalism and European Unification, from Ottawa to the Brexit Referendum". Historical Materialism. 25 (1): 90–129. doi:10.1163/1569206X-12341511.
5. Davies, Stephen, Margaret Thatcher and the Rebirth of Conservatism, Ashbrook Center for Public Affairs, July 1993
6. Bale, Tim (2011). The Conservative Party: From Thatcher to Cameron. p. 145.
7. Greenblatt, Stephen (2012). The Norton Anthology of English Literature: The Romantic Period. New York: W.W. Norton & Company, Inc. p. 187. ISBN 978-0-39391252-4.
8. Lebrun, Richard (2001). Joseph de Maistre's Life, Thought, and Influence: Selected Studies. McGill-Queen's Press – MQUP. p. 191. ISBN 0-7735-2288-3.
9. Dennis O'Keeffe; John Meadowcroft (2009). Edmund Burke. Continuum. p. 93. ISBN 978-0-8264-2978-0.
10. Andrew Heywood, Political Ideologies: An Introduction. Third Edition. (Palgrave Macmillan, 2003), p. 74.
11. F. P. Lock, Edmund Burke. Volume II: 1784–1797 (Clarendon Press, 2006), p. 585.
12. The Ordinary Experience of Civilized Life: Sidgwick's Politics and the Method of Reflective Analysis, in Essays on Henry Sidgwick, ed. by Bart Schultz (Cambridge, 1992), pp. 333–67, at pp. 349–52
13. Mallett, Phillip. "Dorothy Richardson Jones, 'King of Critics': George Saintsbury, 1845–1933, Critic, Journalist, Historian, Professor." Nineteenth-Century Prose, vol. 21, no. 1, spring 1994, pp. 119
14. Soffer, Reba N.(2009). History, Historians, and Conservatism in Britain and America: From the Great War to Thatcher and Reagan pg. 52–53
15. Heydorn, Oliver. "Social Credit as Toryism – The Clifford Hugh Douglas Institute for the Study and Promotion of Social Credit". www.socred.org.
16. Maitra, Sumantra (2021-07-22). "In search of Nirad Chaudhuri". The Spectator World.
17. Ebenstein, Alan O. (2003). Hayek's Journey: the mind of Friedrich Hayek (First Palgrave Macmillan ed.). New York: Palgrave Macmillan. ISBN 978-1-4039-6038-2.
18. Caldwell, Bruce (2004). Hayek's Challenge: an intellectual biography of F.A. Hayek. Chicago: University of Chicago Press. ISBN 0-226-09193-7.
19. Schmidtz, David; Boettke, Peter (Summer 2021). "Friedrich Hayek". Stanford Encyclopedia of Philosophy.
20. Gamble, Andrew (1996). Hayek: The Iron Cage of Liberty. Routledge. p. 1. ISBN 978-0-367-00974-8.
21. Soffer, Reba N.(2009). History, Historians, and Conservatism in Britain and America: From the Great War to Thatcher and Reagan Pg. 86–109
22. Carter, Stephen G. (2006) Historian of the spirit: an introduction to the life and ideas of Christopher H. Dawson, 1889–1970, Durham theses, Durham University. Page 10
23. Soffer, Reba N.(2009). History, Historians, and Conservatism in Britain and America: From the Great War to Thatcher and Reagan ch. 6, pg. 179
24. Mark Garnett (ed.), Conservative Moments: Reading Conservative Texts, Bloomsbury Academic, 2018, ch. 9.
25. J. Birzer, Bradley (15 November 2019). "Lord David Cecil's Philosophy of History". The Imaginative Conservative.
26. Seldon, Arthur. The virtues of capitalism. Liberty Fund, 2004, (p. 415).
27. "Maurice Cowling". The Daily Telegraph. 26 August 2005.
28. Grimes, William (16 April 2010). "Antony Flew, Philosopher and Ex-Atheist, Dies at 87". The New York Times. New York City. ISSN 1553-8095. OCLC 1645522. Archived from the original on 14 October 2022. "Politically, he was a conservative libertarian, opposed to immigration, egalitarianism, and the European Union. He explored some of these interests in "Crime or Disease?" (1973), "Sociology, Equality and Education" (1976), and "The Politics of Procrustes: Contradictions of Enforced Equality" (1981)."
29. "Lord Quinton". The Daily Telegraph. 21 June 2010.
30. "The Roots of Reason | Issue 77 | Philosophy Now". philosophynow.org.
31. "Paul Johnson, Prolific Historian Prized by Conservatives, Dies at 94 (Published 2023)". 2023-01-12.
32. "Norman Stone: Outspoken historian and writer whose work polarised academic opinion". 2 July 2019.
33. The Stone (29 January 2020). "Roger Scruton Was a Conservative. But What Kind?". The New York Times.
34. "The people who won't hear a word said in favour of Diana". Independent.co.uk. 23 October 2011.
35. M., Lee (22 December 2006). "Stephen R.L. Clark's "anarcho-conservatism"".
36. Silver, Daniel. "John Gray's big idea". The New Criterion.
37. Hill, Henry (10 September 2021). "Snap guide to modern conservative thinkers: 1) Robert Tombs". ConservativeHome.
38. Marre, Oliver (26 July 2009). "Andrew Roberts: The history man who loves to party". The Observer.
39. Skidelsky, William (20 February 2011). "Niall Ferguson: 'Westerners don't understand how vulnerable freedom is'". The Guardian.
40. Harris, John (8 August 2009). "Phillip Blond: The man who wrote Cameron's mood music". The Guardian.
41. Clark, Peel and the Conservatives: A Study in Party Politics 1832–1841, 196–97, 199; Read, Peel and the Victorians, 66–67.
42. Hurd, Douglas and Edward Young. "Disraeli discussed by Douglas Hurd and Edward Young", The Daily Telegraph, 27 June 2013
43. Andrew Roberts (2018). Churchill: Walking with Destiny. Penguin. p. 127. ISBN 978-1-101-98101-6.
44. Langdon, Julia (1 October 2015). "Sir Edward Heath: One Nation Tory's political legacy". BBC News.
45. "1990: Tories choose Major for Number 10". BBC News. 27 November 1990.
46. Quinn, Ben (30 June 2016). "Theresa May sets out 'one-nation Conservative' pitch for leadership". The Guardian. London. Archived from the original on 30 September 2016.
47. Parker, George; Warrell, Helen (25 July 2014). "Theresa May: Britain's Angela Merkel?". Financial Times. London. Archived from the original on 3 July 2016.
48. Hayton, Richard (July 2021). "Conservative Party Statecraft and the Johnson Government". The Political Quarterly. 92 (3): 412–419. doi:10.1111/1467-923X.13006. S2CID 236571324.
49. Parker, George (21 December 2014). "Boris Johnson aims to win back voters as 'One Nation Tory'". Financial Times. London.
50. "Cameron: Tories need new identity". BBC News. 17 November 2005.
51. "Introducing Cameronism". BBC News. 11 July 2011. Archived from the original on 25 April 2012.
52. "Rishi Sunak, a very Tory kind of technocrat". The Economist. 13 April 2013.
53. 'Obituary: Mr T. E. Utley. Defender of traditional values in politics and religion', The Times (23 June 1988), p. 16.
54. Obituaries, The Telegraph (5 October 2020). "Sir Peregrine Worsthorne, brilliant and independent". The Telegraph. ISSN 0307-1235.
55. Wheldon, Wynn (June 2020). "Our Man of Letters". Commentary.
56. "Auberon Waugh". The Telegraph. London. 18 January 2001.
57. Andrew Neil, Full Disclosure (London: Pan, 1997), p. 32.
58. Statesman, New (2023-09-27). "The New Statesman's right power list". New Statesman.
59. "Piers Morgan reveals how he voted in this year's General Election". LBC.
60. "Thousands of pro-Brexit protesters descend on Parliament". Evening Standard. London. 29 March 2019.
61. "Julia Hartley-Brewer: Political Correctness and Free Speech". Oxford Talks. Archived from the original on 30 December 2018.
62. Sabbagh, Dan (17 February 2013). "Fraser Nelson: The Spectator is more cocktail party than political party". The Guardian.
63. Waterson, Jim (11 June 2018). "Profile: Isabel Oakeshott and The Bad Boys of Brexit". The Guardian.
64. Blanchard, Paul (21 November 2019). "Camilla Tominey – Associate Editor, Daily Telegraph". Media Masters (Podcast).
65. Statesman, New (2023-09-27). "The New Statesman's right power list". New Statesman.
66. Dolsten, Josefin (5 June 2019). "Meet the conservative activists who want to override the Supreme Court". The Times of Israel.
67. Rosenthal, John. "London of John Constable". Encyclopedia Britannica. "An economic depression after the Napoleonic Wars had led to agrarian riots, and yet Constable, a loyal Tory, chose to portray an abstracted, well-ordered English society that was untouched by the industrial and social changes surrounding him."
68. Graham-Dixon, Andrew (November 13, 2005). "Samuel Palmer: Vision and Landscape". The Telegraph. "Palmer was as conservative in his political and religious beliefs as he was revolutionary in his artistic methods."
69. Vaughan, 18–21, 20 quoted
70. Cumming, Laura (30 September 2007). "Thoroughly modern Millais". The Guardian. "His own character is tremendously elusive. A prodigy so exceptional his first works take your breath away, he was simultaneously a cultural rebel and a social reactionary. He could offend Protestant England with his religious allegories and win it back with soap ads."
71. Lee, Donald (31 August 2012). "Exhibition explores the avant-garde aspects of the conservative Pre-Raphaelites". The Art Newspaper.
72. Jones, Jonathan (6 November 2013). "The revolution will not be aestheticised the top rightwing artists". The Guardian.
73. Cumming, Laura (30 June 2013). "Lowry and the Painting of Modern Life – review". The Guardian. "According to The Guardian, L. S. Lowry loathed sentiment, was a lifelong conservative and made frankly caustic remarks about the crowds he painted."
74. Hudson, Mark (24 June 2013). "LS Lowry: there's more to him than matchstick men". The Telegraph. "A tall, ungainly man in a raincoat who tramped the Salford streets, a rent-collector by day and an artist by night, a lifelong Tory voter and teetotaller, who lived with his mother and never formed relationships with women, Lowry is seen as a social and cultural curiosity: a naive outsider, whose relentlessly repetitive work hints at an intellectual and emotional constriction, an Asperger's-like precocity. He's universally known in this country, but means pretty much nothing anywhere else."
75. Lybarger, Jeremy (21 April 2021). "The Turbulent Life of Francis Bacon". The New Republic. "Bacon was a conservative at heart—when drunk, he'd sometimes lambaste poor people for their supposed weakness—but his art, as channeled through his queerness, cast a critical, if oblique, eye on the prevailing culture."
76. Brown, Neal (5 May 1998). "Francis Bacon". Frieze. "Bacon's often very beautiful, grandee swirlings and sexualised skidmarks of paint are depictive of certain principal categories of subject. These are either other right-wing libertines like himself, or suicides and alcoholics – alcoholics, of course, just being suicides in slow motion."
77. van Praagh, Anna (5 July 2009). "Gilbert and George: 'Margaret Thatcher did a lot for art'". The Daily Telegraph. Archived from the original on 8 July 2009.
78. Michael Prodger (November 2019). "The Critic Interview: Gilbert and George". The Critic.
79. Jonathan Jones (1 March 2021). "Gilbert and George on their epic Covid artworks: 'This is an enormously sad time'". The Guardian.
80. Arifa Akbar (30 August 2010). "Artists flinch at 'honour' of hanging in Tory offices – Culture minister Ed Vaizey says he ruffled feathers after selecting contemporary artworks to adorn Westminster". The Independent on Sunday. London, UK.
81. "Tracey Emin: I'm abused by other artists for voting Tory". 28 December 2011. Archived from the original on 12 January 2022.
82. Hunt, Tristram (7 June 2007). "Behind the pomp and circumstance". The Guardian.
83. Byron Adams, ed. (November 14, 2011). Edward Elgar and His World. Princeton University Press. p. 312. ISBN 9781400832101.
84. Wyman, Bill (15 May 2000). "Stone age survivor". The Guardian.
85. Sweeting (7 May 2015). "Errol Brown obituary". The Guardian.
86. Bordowitz, Hank (2014). Led Zeppelin on Led Zeppelin. Chicago Review Press. p. 480. ISBN 978-1-61374-757-5.
87. Stubbs, David (21 April 2015). "Join The Chant? Pop's Endlessly Problematic Relationship With Politics". The Quietus.
88. Power, Martin (2016). No Quarter The Three Lives of Jimmy Page. Omnibus Press. p. 400. ISBN 978-0-571-32241-1.
89. "I will never forgive Labour for their immigration policies". The Telegraph. Archived from the original on 12 January 2022.
90. Prynne, Miranda (22 October 2013). "The NHS makes people unhealthy, says rock legend Roger Daltrey". The Daily Telegraph.
91. "Roger Daltrey: 'Woke generation' is creating a 'miserable world'". Yahoo! News. 30 April 2021.
92. Mckendree, Alan (1995). "Interview with John Entwistle".
93. "Rod the Mod". International Times (94): 17. 17–31 December 1970.
94. Evans, Greg (27 June 2025). "Rod Stewart tells people to 'give Farage a chance'". The Independent.
95. Bainbridge, Luke (October 14, 2007). "The ten right-wing rockers". The Guardian.
96. Matre, Lynn Van (26 August 1988). "BRYAN FERRY". Chicago Tribune.
97. Cole, Paul (22 May 2019). "Wizzard's Roy Wood: 'I wish it could be Brexit every day'". Birmingham Mail.
98. Palmer, Robert (21 Jan 1981). "The Pop Life; Winwood, at 32, a rock traditionalist". New York Times.
99. DeCurtis, Anthony (1 December 1988). "Steve Winwood: From Mr. Fantasy to Mr. Entertainment". Rolling Stone. "His experimental records had never reached much of an audience, and his solo album entered a musical and social culture that seemed to have no place for him or his increasingly conservative values."
100. Laing, Dave (2 October 2014). "Lynsey de Paul obituary". The Guardian.
101. Gourlay, Dom (2012-04-03). ""The best dressed band in England" – DiS meets Kenney Jones of The Small Faces & The Who / In Depth // Drowned In Sound". Drowned in Sound. Archived from the original on 20 October 2014.
102. Wheeler, Brian (26 November 2010). "So what exactly is 'progressive' in politics?". BBC News.
103. Thing, Oliver (22 January 2017). "Today's Britain rings hollow for Mr Tubular Bells". The Times.
104. Lewis, Isobel (4 November 2020). "Sex Pistols' John Lydon says voters are done with 'intellectual left-wing ideas' as he defends Trump". The Independent.
105. Clarke, Naomi (July 2022). "Johnny Rotten backs Jacob Rees-Mogg to be the next Prime Minister". Independent.co.uk.
106. McGrath, Nick (1 June 2022). "John Lydon: 'I've got no animosity against any of the royal family'". The Times.
107. Callwood, Brett (October 28, 2020). "Basslines and Protest Signs Part 61: What Would Jello Do?". idobi Radio. ""Johnny has had a conservative streak in him from the get go," he says. "He was coming out in favor of nuclear power in the '80s."
108. Bainbridge, Luke (14 October 2007). "The ten right-wing rockers". The Guardian.
109. Starkey, Arun (August 26, 2022). "7 of the most shocking political stances of musicians". Far Out Magazine.
110. Stubbs, David (21 April 2015). "Join The Chant? Pop's Endlessly Problematic Relationship With Politics". The Quietus. "Ian Curtis of Joy Division not only voted Conservative in 1979 but persuaded the Liberal candidate to give him a lift to the polling station in order to do so."
111. Curtis, Deborah (2014). Touching From a Distance. Faber & Faber. p. 256. ISBN 978-0-571-32241-1.
112. E. Smith, Mark (2014). Renegade The Lives and Tales of Mark E. Smith. Penguin Books Limited. p. 256. ISBN 978-0-241-97243-4.
113. Matos, Michaelangelo (2020). How 1984 Became Pop's Blockbuster Year. Hachette Books. p. 480. ISBN 978-0-306-90335-9.
114. "Iron Maiden's Bruce Dickinson reveals why he voted to leave the EU and says he's 'quite relaxed' about Brexit". NME. 26 November 2018. Archived from the original on Nov 27, 2018.
115. Hann, Michael (25 March 2009). "Spandau Ballet: The sound of Thatcherism". The Guardian.
116. "Gary Barlow backs David Cameron". Digital Spy. UK. 16 April 2010.
117. Spadoni, Shelly (July 22, 2024). "EXCLUSIVE: Kerry Katona endorses Donald Trump for US President: 'I really like him'". OK!.
118. "Winston Marshall, Author at The Spectator". The Spectator. 2023-09-27.
119. "Laurence Olivier Trivia". IMDb.
120. Beckett, Francis (2005). "The tragedy of Vivien Leigh". Laurence Olivier. Life & Times. Haus Publishing. pp. 73–92. ISBN 978-1-904950-38-7. JSTOR j.ctt1rv6235.7.
121. Claus, Peter; Marriott, John (2017). History An Introduction to Theory, Method and Practice. Taylor & Francis. p. 518. ISBN 9781317409878.
122. Troy, Gil (2017-11-25). "Conservative, Gay, and in the Closet in 1960s Hollywood". The Daily Beast.
123. "James Clavell's Asian Adventures – Fountainhead Institute". fountainheadinstitute.com. Archived from the original on 2013-03-10.
124. Travis, Alan (January 30, 2010). "Letters of congratulations to Margaret Thatcher on becoming prime minister". The Guardian.
125. Sinyard, Neil. "Forbes, Bryan (1926–2013)". Screenonline. Archived from the original on 2009-09-07. "Undoubtedly his most controversial screenplay – and arguably his best – was for Guy Green's The Angry Silence (1960), in which Richard Attenborough is 'sent to Coventry' by his workmates after refusing to join an unofficial strike. Left-wing critics were outraged by the film's portrayal of the unions and its caricatured communists, but Forbes (who politically has always leaned to the right) maintained that he achieved a fair balance by portraying the management as equally crass."
126. "Antony Jay obituary: creator of Yes Minister who gave disconcertingly real insight into the corridors of power". The Independent. 2016-08-23.
127. "Michael Caine: 'The Government has reached its limit with me'". The Daily Telegraph. 25 April 2009.
128. "Michael Winner: 'Calm down, dear, it's only an interview'". The Daily Telegraph. 7 August 2009.
129. Vincent, Sally (16 Sep 2000). "Against the grain". The Guardian.
130. Kelly, Katherine E., ed. (2001). The Cambridge Companion to Tom Stoppard. Cambridge: Cambridge University Press. ISBN 0-521-64592-1.
131. Sweney, Mark (19 November 2010). "Downton Abbey creator Julian Fellowes to become Tory peer". The Guardian. London.
132. Kuczynski, Alex (October 16, 2000). "Media, Actor Sees Politics in Editing of Film". New York Times. "And Mr. Oldman, who in real life is politically conservative, is furious. In the November issue of Premiere magazine, Mr. Oldman and his manager, Douglas Urbanski, also a producer of the film, argue that DreamWorks massaged the movie's editing process so that Mr. Oldman's character is portrayed as a villain, not as the multifaceted Republican hero Mr. Oldman agreed to play."
133. Watt, Holly; Mason, Rowena; Siddique, Haroon; Grierson, Jamie; Pegg, David (April 1, 2015). "Donors and peers among signatories of pro-Tory business letter". The Guardian.
134. "Politics". T. S. Eliot.
135. Franklin, Caroline (2024-09-18). The Longman Anthology of Gothic Verse (1 ed.). London: Routledge. doi:10.4324/9781003576389. ISBN 978-1-003-57638-9.
136. scratch (2014-08-03). "Wordsworth and the French Revolution". Wordsworth Grasmere.
137. Wingfield, Anna (2019-05-01). Wordsworth's British Empire: Property, Liberty, and the Slave Question (Thesis).
138. "Scott, Sir Walter (1771–1832) | Whitman Archive". whitmanarchive.org.
139. Hamilton, Andy (2017-08-10), "Coleridge and Conservatism: Contemplation of an Idea", in Cheyne, Peter (ed.), Coleridge and Contemplation, Oxford University Press, p. 0, doi:10.1093/oso/9780198799511.003.0010, ISBN 978-0-19-879951-1
140. "Robert Southey". Encyclopædia Britannica.
141. Eastwood, David (1989). "Robert Southey and the Intellectual Origins of Romantic Conservatism". The English Historical Review. 104 (411): 308–331. doi:10.1093/ehr/CIV.CCCCXI.308. ISSN 0013-8266. JSTOR 571737.
142. Caldwell, Christopher (2003-10-17). "Man Out of Time". Slate. ISSN 1091-2339.
143. Säävälä, Clarice (20 February 2025). "Mere sound, conveying no meaning' – Edward Bulwer-Lytton's oratory struggles in the House of Commons, 1831–41 & 1851–66". Parliaments, Estates and Representation. 45 (3): 420–434. doi:10.1080/02606755.2025.2464369. hdl:10138/598492.
144. Thormählen, Marianne (2017). "Charlotte Brontë: A radical Tory". Literature Compass. 14 (12) e12428. doi:10.1111/lic3.12428. ISSN 1741-4113.
145. "Hopkins and Patmore: Tory Politics and Poetry | History Today". www.historytoday.com.
146. Gardner, Martin (2000). Introduction to The annotated Alice: Alice's adventures in Wonderland & Through the looking glass. W. W. Norton & Company. p. xv. ISBN 0-517-02962-6.
147. McKie, David (2008). McKie's Gazetteer, A Local History of Britain. Atlantic Books. p. 19. ISBN 978-1-84354-654-2.Under Ashford, Kent.
148. Tillotson, Geoffrey (1951). Criticism and the Nineteenth Century. London: Athlone Press, p. 124.
149. Stevenson, Robert Louis (1907) [originally written 1877]. "Crabbed Age and Youth". Crabbed Age and Youth and Other Essays. Portland, Maine: Thomas B. Mosher. pp. 11–12.
150. "H. Rider Haggard | Research Starters | EBSCO Research". EBSCO.
151. Kirk, Russell (1968). Collected Articles on George Gissing: Who Knows George Gissing?. London: Frank Cass & Co. pp. 3–13.
152. "How Joseph Conrad Formed an Identity as an English Novelist". Culture.pl.
153. Winder, Robert (2004). Bloody Foreigners. London: Little, Brown. p. 264. ISBN 978-0-349-13880-0.
154. "Jacobs, William", in Stanley J. Kunitz and Howard Haycraft, Twentieth Century Authors, A Biographical Dictionary of Modern Literature, (Third Edition). New York, The H. W. Wilson Company, 1950, pp. 721–723.
155. Miller, David and Dinan, William (2008) A Century of Spin. Pluto Press. ISBN 978-0-7453-2688-7
156. Thrane, James R. (1973). "Two New Stories by "Saki" (H. H. Munro)". Modern Fiction Studies. 19 (2): 139–144. JSTOR 26279005.
157. Drake, Robert (1962). "Saki "Some Problems and a Bibliography"". Gale. "He satirized society from the point of view of aristocratic Toryism in short stories"
158. "The Autobiography of Lord Alfred Douglas", (1929), p. 220
159. Pearce, Joseph (1 June 2022). "The Genius of Robert Hugh Benson". The Imaginative Conservative.
160. Green, Robert (1979). "Ford Madox Ford's The Inheritors: A Conservative Response to Social Imperialism". English Literature in Transition. 22 (1): 50–61 – via Project MUSE.
161. Fawcett, Edmund (2020). Conservatism: The Fight for a Tradition. Princeton: Princeton University Press. p. 252. ISBN 978-0-691-17410-5.
162. Kirk, Russell (2019). Russell Kirk's Concise Guide to Conservatism. Washington: Regnery Publishing. p. 4. ISBN 978-1-62157-878-9.
163. "Debate on the Address". Parliamentary Debates (Hansard). House of Commons. 24 November 1932. col. 261.
164. "The Durham Contest", The Times, 17 March 1939, p. 38
165. "Plunkett, Edward John Moreton Drax | Dictionary of Irish Biography". www.dib.ie. Archived from the original on 2021-08-12.
166. Rothon, Robert (July 1, 2009). "Remembering Radclyffe Hall". Xtra Magazine. "It made her famous – notorious, really – it made her a great deal of money, and terrific old Tory that she was, it made her an outcast when the great and the good turned against her and suppressed her novel in Great Britain."
167. "The New Right of T.E. Hulme". Compact. 2025-02-07.
168. Heselton, Philip (2012), Witchfather: A Life of Gerald Gardner, Vol. 1: Into the Witch Cult, pg.230
169. Eagleton, Terry (2005), The English Novel: An Introduction, Wiley-Blackwell, pp. 258–260.
170. Hutton, Ronald (1999), The Triumph of the Moon: A History of Modern Pagan Witchcraft, pg.360
171. Casey Chalk (10 February 2022). "The deep conservatism of Agatha Christie". The Spectator.
172. Holmes, Rachel (2014-11-28). "Between desire and dynasty: the dual identity of Vita Sackville-West". New Statesman.
173. Ferguson, Niall (3 December 2021). "How the world misunderstood Tolkien, the ultra-Tory". The Telegraph.
174. Wisker, Gina (2012), "Wheatley, Dennis", The Encyclopedia of the Gothic, John Wiley & Sons, Ltd, doi:10.1002/9781118398500.wbeotgw006, ISBN 978-1-118-39850-0
175. "Eibhear Walshe, Elizabeth Bowen". Irish University Review: A Journal of Irish Studies. Archived from the original on 19 January 2012.
176. "Project MUSE – Login". Archived from the original on 4 March 2016.
177. "Cartland, Barbara". Howard Gotlieb Archival Research Center. Boston University. Archived from the original on 9 November 2012.
178. Richard Dalby, (editor) The Virago Book of Ghost Stories: The Twentieth Century: Volume Two.Virago, London, 1991. 1-85381-454-7 (p.318).
179. Newsome, Bruce (27 September 2020). "Evelyn Waugh was right: British politics went wrong in the 1920s". The Critic.
180. Hastings, Max (2023-09-29). "Ian Fleming: The Complete Man by Nicholas Shakespeare review — wives and mothers". www.thetimes.com.
181. Brunetta, Leslie (1992). "England's Finest Hour: And Henry Green's "Caught"". The Sewanee Review. 100 (1): 112–123. ISSN 0037-3052. JSTOR 27546488.
182. Nicholas Birns, 312–4, 320–2; Barber, 46
183. Beckerman, Jane Dryhurst (2021-10-26), "John Betjeman, the Subversive Conservative", in David, Hilda; Jarman, Francis (eds.), Text Wars: Communication, Censorship, Freedom and Responsibility, Oxford University Press, pp. 122–146, doi:10.1093/oso/9780199499076.003.0008, ISBN 978-0-19-949907-6
184. Lillios, Anna (2004). Lawrence Durrell and the Greek World. Susquehanna University Press. ISBN 978-1-57591-076-5.
185. MSS (1983). "MT: Roald Dahl letter to MT (MT's eye operation) [Dahl: "Please accept this little posy from a neighbour who is mighty relieved that you have made such a good recovery"] [released 2013]". United Kingdom: Churchill Archives Centre.
186. Howard, Kristine. "How They Will Vote". roalddahlfans.com.
187. Cullinan, John. "Anthony Burgess, The Art of Fiction No. 48". The Paris Review.
188. Reynolds, Stanley (27 November 2014). "PD James obituary". The Guardian.
189. John Wakeman, World Authors 1950–1970 : a companion volume to Twentieth Century Authors. New York : H. W. Wilson Company, 1975; ISBN 0-8242-0419-0 (pp. 444–48).
190. John Wakeman, World Authors 1950–1970: A Companion Volume to Twentieth Century Authors. New York: H. W. Wilson Company, 1975, pp. 448–448 ISBN 0-8242-0419-0.
191. Madsen Pirie, Think Tank: The Story of the Adam Smith Institute, Biteback Publishing, 2012, p. 140.
192. Deacon, Michael (9 August 2022). "Why Philip Larkin was the greatest conservative poet". The Daily Telegraph.
193. Farndale, Nigel (7 December 2013). "Dinner with Margaret Thatcher: the story of a secret supper". The Observer. Archived from the original on 8 December 2013.
194. Reynolds, Stanley (2008-01-04). "George MacDonald Fraser". The Guardian. ISSN 0261-3077.
195. Edgar, David (2006-07-20). "Stalking Out". London Review of Books. Vol. 28, no. 14. ISSN 0260-9592.
196. Baxter, John (13 February 2023). "The Inner Man: The Life of J G Ballard by John Baxter: review". The Daily Telegraph.
197. Liddle, Rod (25 April 2009). "J.G. Ballard was a man of the Right — not that the Right really wanted him". The Spectator.
198. "JG Ballard". Prospect. 19 August 1998.
199. Wheatley, David (2019-05-03). "The Book of Baruch by the Gnostic Justin by Geoffrey Hill review – the last judgments". The Guardian. ISSN 0261-3077.
200. MacDougald, Park (2018-08-13). "The World as He Saw It: V. S. Naipaul, 1932–2018". The Point Magazine.
201. "Women and gender in the Conservative party archive". 24 November 2015.
202. Frederick Forsyth (10 March 2016). "The EU was never meant to be a democracy, says Frederick Forsyth". Daily Express.
203. Butler, R. (September 1974). "Ferdinand Mount, The Theatre of Politics". Canadian Journal of Political Science. 7 (3): 592–593. doi:10.1017/S0008423900041032.
204. Miller, Laura (2017-07-26). "The World Without Us". Slate. ISSN 1091-2339.
205. "The UK's 'other paper of record'". BBC News. 19 January 2004.
206. Christina Schaeffner, ed. (2009). Political Discourse, Media and Translation. Cambridge Scholars Publishing. p. 35. ISBN 978-1-4438-1793-6. "With regard to political affiliation The Daily Telegraph is a right-wing paper, The Times centre-right, The Financial Times centre-right and liberal, and The Guardian centre-left."
207. . "The Times", 11 December 2019. Retrieved 15 May 2023.
208. "General Election 2015 explained: Newspapers". The Independent. 28 April 2015.
209. "General election 2019: Keep Mr Corbyn out at all costs. So vote Conservative". 17 May 2023.
210. Why The Spectator is the world's oldest weekly magazine. The Spectator.
211. Landler, Mark; Castle, Stephen (31 May 2020). "Rogue Trip by Boris Johnson Aide Makes U.K.'s Spectator Part of the Story". The New York Times. ISSN 0362-4331. Archived from the original on 30 July 2021.
212. McCreesh, Shawn (14 February 2020). "A Visit With Andrew Neil, The Spectator's Publisher and Boris Johnson's Old Boss". New York. Archived from the original on 30 July 2021.
213. General Election 2015 explained: Newspapers The Independent, 28 April 2015. Retrieved 9 December 2016.
214. "UK Conservative candidates throw hats in ring to replace Johnson". Al Jazeera. 10 July 2022. "Foreign Secretary Liz Truss announced her candidacy in the right-wing Daily Telegraph newspaper on Sunday evening [...]"
