= Back (novel) =

1946 novel by Henry Green

- First edition
- Author: Henry Green
- Cover artist: Vanessa Bell
- Language: English
- Publisher: Hogarth Press
- Publication date: 1946
- Publication place: United Kingdom
- Media type: Print (Paperback)
- Pages: 246 pp
- OCLC: 7249851
- Dewey Decimal: 823/.912 19
- LC Class: PR6013.R416 B3 1981
- Preceded by: Loving
- Followed by: Concluding

Back is a novel written by British writer Henry Green and published in 1946.

== Plot summary ==
The novel tells the story of Charley Summers, a young Englishman who comes back from Germany, where he was detained as a POW for three years after having been wounded in combat in France (possibly in 1939–1940). Summers is repatriated because, due to his wound, his leg had to be amputated. While he was prisoner, Rose, the woman he loved, died, and this adds to the shock Charley suffered because of the mutilation. Moreover, Rose was married to another man, so Charley cannot even express his bereavement for fear of scandal.

After having visited the grave of Rose and met her husband James there, Charley calls on Rose's father, Mr Grant, who encourages him to make acquaintance with a young widow. Charley ignores the suggestion at first, but after some days he goes to the widow's flat and he is astonished at the uncanny resemblance between the woman, whose name is Nancy Whitmore, and Rose. He soon finds out that there is a very simple explanation for this: Nancy is the illegitimate daughter of Mr Grant, who sent Charley to her thinking he might console her of the death of her husband (an RAF pilot killed in action in Egypt).

The rest of the novel describes the complex and troubled relation between Charley and Nancy, as it unfolds against the background of a war-torn Britain.
