= Dorothy Wellesley, Duchess of Wellington =

English author and socialite (1889–1956)

Dorothy Violet Wellesley, Duchess of Wellington (née Ashton; 30 July 1889 – 11 July 1956), styled Lady Gerald Wellesley between 1914 and 1943, was an English author, poet, literary editor and socialite.

== Early life and inheritance ==
She was born in White Waltham, the daughter of Col. Robert Ashton of Croughton, Cheshire (himself a second cousin of the 1st Baron Ashton of Hyde) and his wife (Lucy) Cecilia Dunn-Gardner. Her family nickname was "Dotty".

Robert Ashton was a wealthy Cheshire landowner; his great-granduncle Robert Ashton Esq. had been a successful cotton manufacturer, and following his death in 1856 the life interest in his estate passed to Dorothy's father Robert. During Dorothy's childhood the family's country home was Croughton Cottage in Cheshire, and in the late 1890s their London residence was No. 21 Park Lane.

Dorothy's father Robert Ashton died aboard his yacht in July 1898; his estate was valued at £123,639 for probate. Under the terms of his will, his wife received £11,000 and a life interest in the income from his personal estate, which would then pass to Dorothy. Under the terms of the Will of Robert's great-granduncle, the Trust which held his estate vested into the absolute ownership of Dorothy's brother following their father's death.

Less than a year later in April 1899, her mother married the 10th Earl of Scarbrough; the union produced Dorothy's half-sister Lady Serena Lumley (1901–2000).

Dorothy's only brother, Robert Cecil Noel Ashton, died unmarried at the age of 24 in 1912. His gross estate was valued at £467,902 (equivalent to £44,222,790 in 2023) with a net personality £374,920 from which approximately £77,000 in death duties was paid. His will provided for £60,000 of bequests to various family members, with the residue (approximately £237,000) placed in a trust; the trust income would be paid to Dorothy for her lifetime, and then her descendants in the male line. Following the death of Dorothy's mother in 1931, she came into full possession of her father's personal estate.

== Marriage and family ==
On 30 April 1914 Dorothy married Lord Gerald Wellesley at Church of St Bartholomew, Smithfield. Dorothy was given away by her stepfather Lord Scarborough.

At the time of their marriage Lord Gerald was the third son of Arthur Wellesley, 4th Duke of Wellington, although the deaths of his two older brothers and nephew would later result in him succeeding as 7th Duke of Wellington in 1943.

The marriage was reported on by international newspapers, with some noting that Dorothy was the third heiress to whom her new mother-in-law the Duchess of Wellington had successfully married one of her sons.

The marriage produced two children:

1. Valerian Wellesley, 8th Duke of Wellington (2 July 1915 – 31 December 2014)
2. Lady Elizabeth Wellesley (26 December 1918 – 25 November 2013)

Lord and Lady Gerald Wellesley separated in 1922 but did not divorce. According to a 2009 memoir by her granddaughter, Lady Jane Wellesley, Dorothy Wellesley left her husband and children when she became the lover of Vita Sackville-West. Wellesley and Sackville-West took several trips together, including one to Persia, with artist Marjorie Jebb and art historian Leigh Ashton.

After that relationship ended, for eight years Wellesley became the lover and companion of Hilda Matheson (1888–1940), a BBC producer, who had herself had a three-year love affair with Sackville-West. Matheson moved to "Penns in the Rocks", a farm on the Wellesley estate in the Sussex village of Withyham. A certain distance was called for due to Dorothy's sometimes erratic and demanding behaviour. This relationship, a key stabilizer in both their lives, ended tragically with the death of Hilda during a routine thyroid operation.

== Poetry ==
As Dorothy Wellesley, the name she took after her marriage to Lord Gerald Wellesley, she was the author of more than ten books, mostly of poetry, but including also Sir George Goldie, Founder of Nigeria (1934), and Far Have I Travelled (1952). She was editor for Hogarth Press of the Hogarth Living Poets series. She also edited The Annual in 1929.

According to W. B. Yeats, Wellesley was one of the greatest writers of the twentieth century. He gave her sixteen pages in his Oxford Book of Modern Verse 1892–1935 and praised her in the introduction. According to Wellesley, "Within two minutes of our first meeting at my house he said: ‘You must sacrifice everything and everyone to your poetry'".

Yeats discovered her poetry while researching the Oxford Book of Modern Verse. He said "My eyes filled with tears. I read in excitement that was more delightful because it showed that I had not lost my understanding of poetry." Only later did he find who she was and what was her station in life.

Yeats scholar R. F. Foster, however, has written that she was "a moderately accomplished if minor poet" though adding that "the quality of some of her work has been vindicated by time".

She was introduced to Yeats in 1935. He went on to edit and revise her poems as well as soliciting her comments on his own work. Together they edited the second series of Broadsides: New Irish & English Songs in 1937. Yeats spent much of his final time towards the end of his life with Wellesley at her Sussex home. She was at his deathbed in 1939.

== Death ==
The Duchess of Wellington died at Withyham, Sussex. After her death, her widower proposed to her half-sister, Lady Serena James (née Lumley), widow of his former brother-in-law the Hon. Robert James), but she refused him.

== In popular culture ==
She was one of a series of society beauties photographed as classical figures by Madame Yevonde. Dorothy Wellesley is portrayed by Karla Crome in the 2018 film Vita and Virginia.

== Sources ==
- Letters on Poetry from W. B. Yeats to Dorothy Wellesley (1940, Oxford University Press) edited by Kathleen Raine
