= A Letter to a Young Poet =

Letter by Virginia Woolf

- First edition cover 1932
- Author: Virginia Woolf
- Cover artist: John Banting
- Language: English
- Publisher: Hogarth Press
- Publication date: 1932
- Publication place: United Kingdom
- Pages: 28 pp.

A Letter to a Young Poet is an epistolary essay by Virginia Woolf, written in 1932 to John Lehman, laying out her views on modern poetry.

== History ==
In 1932, Woolf responded to a letter from the writer, John Lehmann, about her novel The Waves (1931) in which he asked her to write about her views on modern poetry. Lehmann had a mission to revitalise modern poetry, and came to the Hogarth Press to enlist their help. Virginia was enthusiastic about his suggestion of a "letter to a young poet", which she thought was "most brilliant". Her essay takes the form of an epistolary letter addressed to Lehmann, and was first published in North America in The Yale Review in June 1932, and then by the Hogarth Press as the eighth in their series, The Hogarth Letters, consisting of 12 titles produced between 1931 and 1933. John Banting illustrated the covers.

Following Virginia Woolf's death, Leonard Woolf included the letter in a collection of essays published under the title The Death of the Moth and other Essays (1942).

== Premise ==
Woolf expanded the scope to include the art of poetry, literature, and in particular letter writing. In her view letter writing as an art "has only just come into existence". In Woolf's view poetry demands both facility in introspection, as well as a deep understanding of the human species.

"a work of renovation... has to be done from time to time and was certainly needed, for bad poetry is almost always the result of forgetting oneself...all becomes distorted and impure if you lose sight of that central reality"

Woolf argues that indeed it is the intersection of that understanding of oneself and one's understanding of humanity that underlies the essential nature of writing "-now... that poetry has done all this, why should it not once more open its eyes, look out of the window and write about other people?", to be introspective alone is to be "a self that sits alone in the room at night with the blinds drawn". In view of the title, her admonition " And for heaven’s sake, publish nothing before you are thirty" is notable. As elsewhere in her literary criticism, such as "Modern Fiction", she felt that the writer has to come to terms with the reality of everyday life, "the common objects of daily prose—the bicycle and the omnibus". Though nominally addressed to Lehmann, her critique was addressed to a number of young poets of the day, including her nephew, Julian Bell, Stephen Spender, Cecil Day Lewis and W.H. Auden.

== Reception ==
Lehman felt her understanding of poetry was inadequate, and later parted company with the Woolfs. Her quoted examples have been criticised as not amongst the cited poet's best, a criticism she later accepted.

== Bibliography ==
- Olson, Liesl (2009). Modernism and the Ordinary. Oxford University Press. ISBN 978-0-19-970972-4.
- Southworth, Helen, ed. (2012). Leonard and Virginia Woolf, The Hogarth Press and the Networks of Modernism. Edinburgh University Press. ISBN 978-0-7486-6921-9.
  - Hussey, Mark (2012). "W.H.Day Spender" had a Sister: Joan Adeney Easdale. pp. 34–.
- Woolf, Virginia (2016) [1932 Hogarth Press]. A Letter to a Young Poet. Read Books Limited. ISBN 978-1-4733-6307-6. (complete text)
- "Hogarth Press: The Series". Special Collections Department. University of Delaware Library. 2010.
- "A Letter to a Young Poet". New York: B & B Rare Books. 2018. Archived from the original on 7 April 2018.
