= Gerald Yorke =

English soldier and writer

Personal information
- Full name: Gerald Joseph Yorke
- Born: 10 December 1901; Tewkesbury, Gloucestershire, England
- Died: 29 April 1983 (aged 81); Tewkesbury, Gloucestershire, England
- Relatives: VW Yorke (father)

Domestic team information
- Years: Team
- 1925: Gloucestershire
- Only First-class: 27 June 1925 Gloucestershire v Glamorgan

Career statistics
Competition	First-class
Matches	1
Runs scored	6
Batting average	3.00
100s/50s	0/0
Top score	6
Catches/stumpings	0/–
- Source: CricketArchive, 10 January 2011

Major Gerald Joseph Yorke (10 December 1901 – 29 April 1983) was an English soldier and writer. He was a Reuters correspondent while in China for two years in the 1930s, and wrote a book China Changes (1936).

== Life ==
Gerald Joseph Yorke was born in the family home, Forthampton Court, near Tewkesbury, Gloucestershire, on 10 December 1901; the second son of Vincent Wodehouse Yorke and Hon. Maud Evelyn Wyndham. His younger brother was the novelist, Henry Yorke, who wrote under the penname 'Henry Green'. He attended Eton College, and then Trinity College, Cambridge University, where he gained a first class degree in history Bachelor of Arts. On leaving university, an interest in the occult and mysticism led him to contact Aleister Crowley, with whom he was closely associated for four years. Yorke was also a member of Crowley's magical order the A∴A∴, and supervised a number of neophyte members.

He joined the Territorial Army and was commissioned in the 21st (Gloucestershire Hussars) Armoured Car Company, Tank Corps in 1922, later gaining the rank of Major.

In September 1932 Yorke left England for China, where he travelled extensively reporting for Reuters on the civil war and Japanese occupation of Manchuria, and studying Chinese culture and Buddhism. The travels of Yorke together with his interpreter Li through often bandit-stricken areas were described in his book China Changes and also commented on by adventurer and Special Correspondent to The Times Peter Fleming in his One's Company, a travelogue of a journey to China in 1933. Some of his papers from this period have been given to the library of the School of Oriental and African Studies at London University.

Returning to England he took a managerial position with the family firm, Pontifex & Co., brewing and sanitary engineers. He married Angela Vivien Duncan, elder daughter of Major General Sir John Duncan, and the pair had three children: John Sarne, Vincent James and Michael Piers. During the war years the family lived in Cambridge where Yorke was posted to oversee airfield defence. At the cessation of hostilities, he took a position in the London office of Pontifex, with the family dividing their time between Forthampton Court and their house in Montagu Square, Marylebone. Yorke was also the personal representative to the West of the Thirteenth Dalai Lama (died 1933) and the author of an original foreword to a secret book on the Kalachakra initiation.

Although no longer a practising occultist, Yorke retained a strong interest in the subject, particularly in the work of Aleister Crowley. Towards the end of Crowley's life Yorke was known as his chief disciple and during this period and after Crowley's death, Yorke assembled an important collection of relevant books and documents which he bequeathed to the Warburg Institute of the University of London.

In his late fifties, Yorke became increasingly immersed in the study and practice of Buddhism, served on the council of the Buddhist Society, and spoke regularly at their meetings. His editorial skills and contacts in the publishing industry, especially his part time position with Rider & Co. and Allen & Unwin, meant that he was able to play an important role in bringing the works of the Dalai Lama to an English-speaking audience, and he also oversaw the publication of texts by then-unknown but now-famous authors such as B.K.S. Iyengar, whose work was seminal to the introduction of Yoga to the West. From this period his correspondence with authors and publishers has been gifted to Reading University. Yorke died in his eighty-second year after a short illness.

== Cricket ==
He was also a keen cricketer who made a single first-class appearance for Gloucestershire, against Glamorgan during the 1925 season. From the middle order, he scored a duck in the first innings in which he batted, and 6 runs in the second.

== Publications ==
- Yorke, Gerald (1936). China Changes. New York: C. Scribnerʼs Sons.
- Yorke, Gerald (1951). "Bibliography of the works of Aleister Crowley". In Symonds, John (ed.). The Great Beast: the Life of Aleister Crowley.
- Yorke, Gerald (1991). Bibliography of the works of Aleister Crowley. Black Lodge Pub.
- Yorke, Gerald (2011). Richmond, Keith (ed.). Aleister Crowley, the Golden Dawn and Buddhism: Reminiscences and Writings of Gerald Yorke. Teitan Press. Includes "A Reminiscence" by Timothy d'Arch Smith; "The Yorke Bibliography of Aleister Crowley" revised by Clive Harper; and "Some Memories and an Interview " by David Tibet.
