= Concluding =

1948 novel by Henry Green

- First edition cover
- Author: Henry Green
- Language: English
- Publisher: Hogarth Press
- Publication date: 1948
- Publication place: United Kingdom
- Media type: Print (hardback & paperback)

Concluding is a novel by British writer Henry Green first published in 1948. It is set entirely on the expansive and idyllic premises of a state-run institution for girls somewhere in rural England and chronicles the events of one summer's day—a Wednesday, and "Founder's Day"—in the lives of the staff, the students, and several other people living on the grounds. During that day, two girls go missing.

== Plot summary ==
The school has been run since its inception ten years earlier by two elderly educators, Mabel Edge and Hermione Baker, who are regarded by many as old spinsters hopelessly out of touch with reality, especially with what their teenage charges really think and feel. The 300 or so students are virtually indistinguishable from one another, a fact which is stressed by their names all starting with the letter M: Margot, Marion, Mary, Melissa, Merode, Midget, Mirabel, Moira. Their budding but suppressed sexuality—they are all between 16 and 18 years of age and "going to be attractive"—is constantly alluded to in the novel. ("They're only children, the girls I mean, and sex is unconscious at their age. It's such a temptation for a man.")

Of the teaching staff, only few characters are mentioned. There is Miss Winstanley, young, colourless, and secretly in love with one of the few male teachers at the academy, economics tutor Sebastian Birt. Birt, however, a short and stout man in his late twenties, is having an affair with Elizabeth Rock, a 35-year-old woman recovering from a nervous breakdown who temporarily also lives on the school grounds, in her grandfather's cottage. That man, 76-year-old Mr Rock, is a retired scientist who has been granted the privilege to live there for the remainder of his life for past services rendered to the State. The ageing Rock, who is referred to as "the sage" by some (including the narrator) and as "Gapa" by his granddaughter, spends his time mainly with, and for, his pets—his albino sow, Daisy, his cat, Alice, and his goose, Ted. He describes himself as "a bit stiff about the joints these days", he has some difficulty climbing steps, has poor eyesight, is deaf in one ear and almost deaf in the other, and has recently had problems with his memory. In addition, one of his idiosyncrasies consists in putting all the post he gets in a big trunk without opening any of it, ever.

Edge, one of the principals, has for some time wanted to thoroughly "spring-clean" the whole place and get rid of Rock, his granddaughter, and Birt, partly to secure the sage's cottage for the use of additional school staff. In other matters, she is more hesitant. When in the morning some girls report Mary and Merode missing, pointing out that neither of their beds has been slept in, Edge turns out to be very reluctant to use the official channels to inform relatives, the school supervisor, or the local police. Naturally it occurs to her and her colleague Baker that Mary and Merode might have eloped with two young men ("At the station much of their time was taken up with young women adrift, who, after fourteen days, returned brown and happy from a fortnight with a boy by the ocean."), but, rather than fearing the worst, they assume the girls will be back for that night's entertainment, a ball in honour of the academy's founder—without men of course. At the same time Edge turns down some of the staff's requests to be allowed to go swimming in the nearby lake, which is interpreted as a sure sign that one of the girls' bodies could turn up any time floating in the water.

In the course of the day, especially where Rock is involved, many people talk at cross-purposes, deliberately as well as accidentally misunderstanding what others are saying, in many instances only hinting at facts or, worse, spreading rumours. Around noon Merode is found, right on the compound but somewhat dazed, under a fallen beech in the vicinity of Rock's cottage—the very beech tree used by Sebastian Birt and Elizabeth Rock when they want to have some fun. According to school regulations, Merode must not be interrogated before she has submitted a written statement about what has happened, and she is immediately locked away for her own good. The rest of the afternoon is mainly taken up with preparations for the dance.

As usual, the Founder's Day Ball is held without any guests from outside the school. However, Rock and his granddaughter turn up unexpectedly but appropriately dressed, without having been invited by anyone. While Mary is still missing (the reader never learns where she is or what has happened to her), Elizabeth Rock and Sebastian Birt start dancing together cheek to cheek and, generally, appear glued to each other, a "display of animalism" Edge is not willing to put up with any longer. Almost at the end of her tether, she secretly indulges in a cigarette or two in her office. Meanwhile, Mr Rock is accosted by several of the girls who first want to dance with him and later drag him downstairs into the cellar of the building where they take turns kissing him and where they introduce him to the "Institute Inn", their secret club. Although Rock initially enjoys the girls' attentions, he quickly becomes appalled by their lack of morals and leaves the "club." He comes upon his nemesis, Miss Edge, but after his experiences with the girls he is more sympathetic to her difficulties maintaining order at the school. For her part, Edge is impressed with the courtly bearing Rock has affected in the Ball's formal setting and also consumed by a tobacco-fuelled lassitude. The two older adults have a pleasant conversation which comes to a head when Edge, almost without realising, finds herself proposing marriage to Rock. The sage is astounded, and politely but firmly rejects her suggestion. He then leaves the ball and returns home to his animals.

At the end of the day no one has reached any conclusions, and everything remains undecided.

== Release details ==
- 1948, UK, Hogarth Press (ISBN NA), hardback (First edition)
- 2000, US, Dalkey Archive Press (ISBN 1-56478-253-0), paperback
