= Saint Thomas Aquinas (Chesterton) =

1933 book by G. K. Chesterton

Saint Thomas Aquinas is a book by G. K. Chesterton, published in 1933. In the introductory note of the book, Chesterton writes that the aim of the work is to be a popular sketch of historical character, who ought to be better known, especially for those who have hardly ever heard of him and are not likely to be of communion of Thomas Aquinas.

Chesterton begins by comparing Aquinas with St. Francis of Assisi. St. Thomas defends God as The Creator. He affirms with Holy Scripture, that God created the physical world good. St. Thomas ultimately defends life against Manichean heresy, which considered the physical world evil. According to Chesterton, Thomas Aquinas represents more the reasonable mind of the man on the street, than modern philosophies.

Étienne Gilson praised Chesterton's book on Thomas Aquinas: "I consider it as being, without possible comparison, the best book ever written on Saint Thomas [...] the few readers who have spent twenty or thirty years in studying St. Thomas Aquinas, and who, perhaps, have themselves published two or three volumes on the subject, cannot fail to perceive that the so-called 'wit' of Chesterton has put their scholarship to shame." Jacques Maritain and Anton Pegis have also appreciated the book in similar manner.

== Outline ==
- Introductory Note
- Chapter I. On Two Friars
- Chapter II. The Runaway Abbot
- Chapter III. The Aristotelian Revolution
- Chapter IV. A Meditation on the Manichees
- Chapter V. The Real Life of St. Thomas
- Chapter VI. The Approach to Thomism
- Chapter VII. The Permanent Philosophy
- Chapter VIII. The Sequel to St. Thomas

== Publication History ==
Publication History of Saint Thomas Aquinas by G. K. Chesterton

Saint Thomas Aquinas* was first published in 1933. The original British edition was issued by Hodder & Stoughton (London) in 1933, with additional printings appearing the same year.

In the United States, the book was published in 1933 by Sheed & Ward (New York), one of the leading Catholic publishing houses of the twentieth century and a frequent publisher of Chesterton's works.

== Major editions ==
Year	Publisher	Location	Notes
1933	Hodder & Stoughton	London, England	First British edition
1933	Sheed & Ward	New York, United States	First American edition
1943	Hodder & Stoughton	London, England	Reprint edition
1974	Image Books (Image Classics)	New York, United States	Paperback edition
2002	Ignatius Press	San Francisco, California, United States	Combined edition with Saint Francis of Assisi
2009	Dover Publications	Mineola, New York, United States	Unabridged republication
2011	Martino Fine Books	Mansfield Centre, Connecticut, United States	Facsimile reprint of the 1943 edition
2011	Angelico Press	Brooklyn, New York, United States	Modern reprint edition
2017	Isha Books	New Delhi, India	Reprint edition

Chesterton wrote Saint Thomas Aquinas as a concise and accessible introduction to the life, thought, and historical significance of the medieval Dominican theologian Thomas Aquinas. Although intended as a popular biography rather than a scholarly study, the book received exceptional praise from leading Thomist scholars. The French philosopher and historian Étienne Gilson famously described it as “the best book ever written on Saint Thomas.”
