= Party Going =

1939 novel by Henry Green

- First edition cover (by John Banting)
- Author: Henry Green
- Language: English
- Publisher: The Hogarth Press
- Publication date: 1939
- Publication place: United Kingdom
- Media type: Print (Hardback & Paperback)
- Pages: 256 pp

Party Going is a 1939 novel by British writer Henry Green (real name Henry Vincent Yorke).

It tells the story of a group of wealthy people awaiting a train in London to go on vacation to France. Due to a fog, however, the train is much delayed and the group takes rooms in the adjacent large railway hotel. Almost all of the action of the story takes place in the hotel.

== Realism or symbolism? ==
Frank Kermode maintained in his essay "The Genesis of Secrecy" that behind the realistic plot of this novel there is a complex web of mythical images, the most important being the figure of the classical Greek god Hermes, which is strongly tied to one of the characters. This led Kermode to consider Party Going as a Modernist novel strongly influenced by the ideas of T.S. Eliot.
