= The Man Who Was Thursday =

1908 novel by G. K. Chesterton

The Man Who Was Thursday: A Nightmare
- First edition
- Author: G. K. Chesterton
- Language: English
- Genre: thriller, philosophical novel, adventure, fantasy
- Set in: London and France, 1900s
- Publisher: J. W. Arrowsmith
- Publication date: 1908
- Publication place: United Kingdom
- Media type: Print (hardcover)
- Pages: viii, 330 pp
- Dewey Decimal: 823.912
- LC Class: PZ3.C4265Mn9
- Text: The Man Who Was Thursday: A Nightmare at Wikisource

The Man Who Was Thursday: A Nightmare is a 1908 novel by G. K. Chesterton. The book has been described as a metaphysical thriller.

== Plot summary ==
Chesterton prefaced the novel with a poem written to Edmund Clerihew Bentley, revisiting the pair's early history and the challenges presented to their early faith by the times.

In Victorian-era London, Gabriel Syme is recruited at Scotland Yard to a secret anti-anarchist police corps. Lucian Gregory, an anarchistic poet, lives in the suburb of Saffron Park. Syme meets him at a party and they debate the meaning of poetry. Gregory argues that revolt is the basis of poetry. Syme demurs, insisting the essence of poetry is not revolution but law. He antagonises Gregory by asserting that the most poetical of human creations is the timetable for the London Underground. He suggests Gregory is not really serious about anarchism, which so irritates Gregory that he takes Syme to an underground anarchist meeting place, under oath not to disclose its existence to anyone, revealing his public endorsement of anarchy is a ruse to make him seem harmless, when in fact he is an influential member of the local chapter of the European anarchist council.

The central council consists of seven men, each using the name of a day of the week as a cover; the position of Thursday is about to be elected by Gregory's local chapter. Gregory expects to win the election but just before, Syme reveals to Gregory after an oath of secrecy that he is a secret policeman. In order to make Syme think that the anarchists are harmless after all, Gregory speaks very unconvincingly to the local chapter, so that they feel that he is not zealous enough for the job. Syme makes a rousing anarchist speech in which he denounces everything that Gregory has said and wins the vote. He is sent immediately as the chapter's delegate to the central council. At the council's breakfast in Leicester Square, Sunday's face seems to grow larger as Syme approaches, reminding him of the colossal mask of Memnon that frightened him as a child.

In his efforts to thwart the council, Syme eventually discovers that five of the other six members are also undercover detectives; each was employed just as mysteriously and assigned to defeat the Council. They soon find out they were fighting each other and not real anarchists; such was the mastermind plan of their president, Sunday. In a surreal conclusion, Sunday reveals that he is not just the leader of the anarchist council but also the one who recruited the detectives to the police force. Gregory returns to challenge the false council with the accusation that they, as rulers, have never suffered like Gregory and their other subjects and so their power is illegitimate. Syme refutes the accusation immediately, because of the terrors inflicted by Sunday on the rest of the council.

Syme asks Sunday whether he has ever suffered. Sunday's face grows until it fills the sky, then everything goes black. In the darkness, Syme seems to hear a distant voice ask, "can ye drink of the cup that I drink of?" The question comes from the Gospel of Mark, chapter 10, verses 38–39, where Jesus rhetorically addresses St. James and St. John to demonstrate that the disciples are wrong to covet his glory because they are unable to bear the suffering for the sins of the world for which he is destined. Syme awakens to find himself strolling through Saffron Park, in amiable conversation with Gregory (apparently a friend), with no recollection of Sunday's face but a deep feeling of exhilaration; the two arrive at a house where Gregory's sister is tending the garden.

== Annotations and details ==
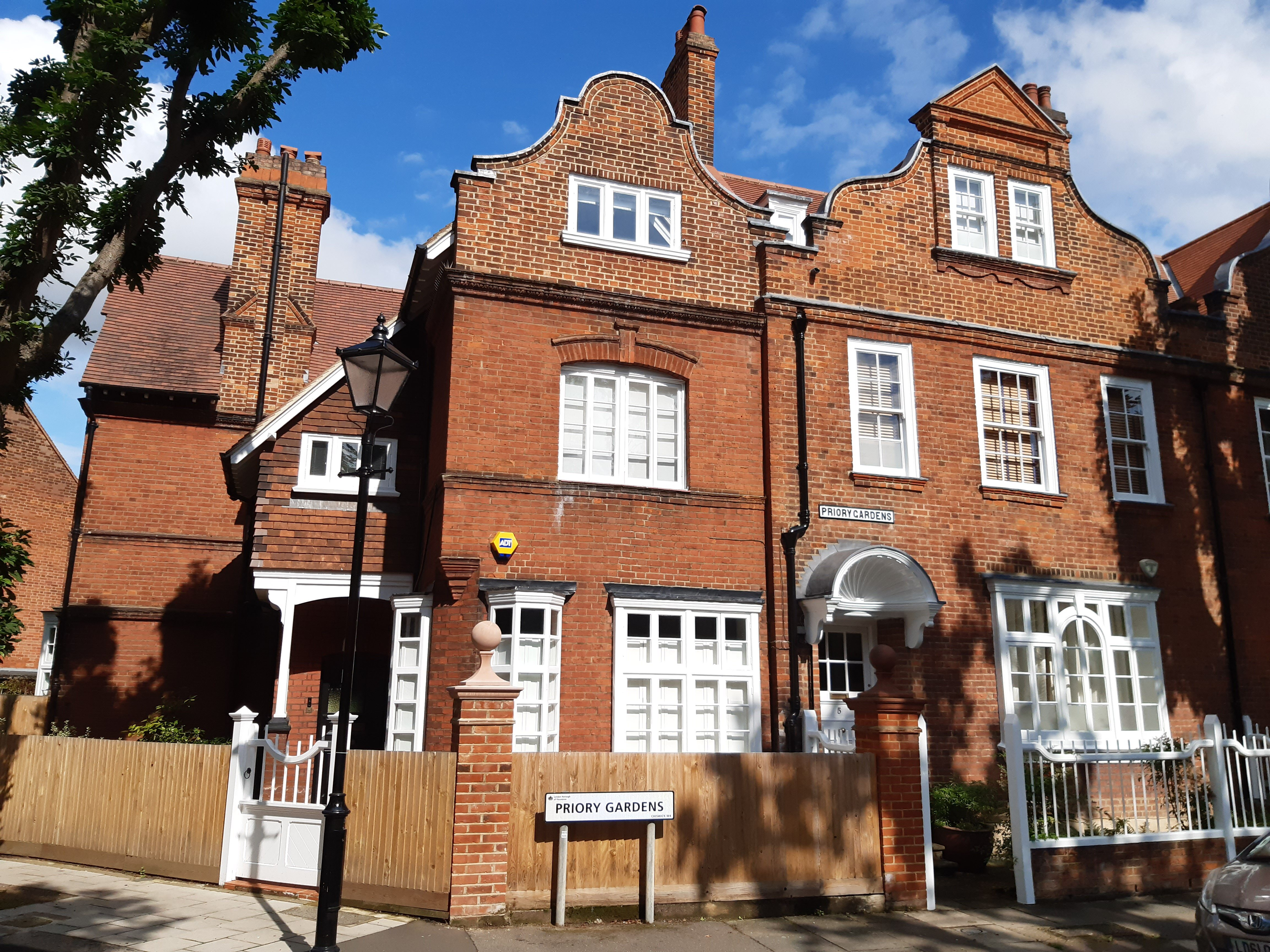
"The suburb of Saffron Park lay on the sunset side of London, as red and ragged as a cloud of sunset. It was built of a bright brick throughout", a parody of Bedford Park

Martin Gardner edited The Annotated Thursday, which provides a great deal of biographical and contextual information in the form of footnotes, along with the text of the book, original reviews from the time of the book's first publication and comments made by Chesterton on the book.

The literary critic Ian Fletcher notes that Chesterton's "Saffron Park", with which the novel begins, is a parody of the garden suburb of Bedford Park in Chiswick, with its red brick buildings, "the outburst of a speculative builder" (Jonathan Carr), "faintly tinged with art" (the suburb was considered aesthetic, and was home to many artists), and its Queen Anne architecture. Fletcher comments that Chesterton met his future wife in the suburb, and that the description was somewhat inaccurate, as Chesterton liked to dramatise.

The costumes the detectives don towards the end of the book represent what was created on their respective day. Sunday, "the sabbath" and "the peace of God," sits upon a throne in front of them. The name of the girl Syme likes, Rosamond, is derived from "Rosa Mundi," meaning "Rose of the World" in Latin.

== Influence and critical assessments ==
Many have noted the influence of The Man Who Was Thursday on surrealism and spy thrillers. Chesterton's book allegedly inspired the Irish Republican Michael Collins with the idea "if you didn't seem to be hiding nobody hunted you out".

The novelist Kingsley Amis describes his reading of the novel as "thrilling", comparing Chesterton to "first-rate action-writer[s] like Ian Fleming or Dick Francis" for suspense, but also "persuading you that something wonderful is afoot, that the events described have a mysterious and momentous significance you hardly dare guess at". Amis calls it "the most thrilling book I have ever read", admiring the twists and turns of the plot:

What we expect from fantasy or a nightmare is that it should develop in an illogical, unpredictable way or perhaps not actually develop at all. But the feeling of the reader of The Man Who Was Thursday ... is of being pulled inexorably along an inevitable path. Even the bizarre scenes turn out to have a definite and intelligible purpose. ... In one way or another, then, the nightmare is a controlled nightmare, and so in its way believable. But the sense of mystery remains, heightened indeed by glimpses of the ordinary world, the backcloth against which the drama or melodrama or whatever we decide to call it takes place. Definition remains impossible: The Man Who Was Thursday is not quite a political bad dream, nor a metaphysical thriller, nor a cosmic joke in the form of a spy novel, but it has something of all three. What it has most of is a boy's adventure story ...

In his final essay, Christopher Hitchens wrote: "As to the durability or importance of GKC as a fictionist: the late Sir Kingsley Amis once told me that he reread The Man Who Was Thursday every year, and on one of his annual visitations wrote a tribute. That novel, with its evocation of eeriness and solitude, and its fascination with anonymity, has been credited by some with a share of influence on Franz Kafka."

Critic Adam Gopnik concurs: "The Man Who Was Thursday is one of the hidden hinges of twentieth-century writing, the place where, before our eyes, the nonsense-fantastical tradition of Lewis Carroll and Edward Lear pivots and becomes the nightmare-fantastical tradition of Kafka and Borges. It is also, along with Chesterton's The Napoleon of Notting Hill, the nearest thing that this masterly writer wrote to a masterpiece."

== Debate on the novel's pessimism ==
Like most of Chesterton's fiction, the story is full of Christian allegory. Chesterton, a Protestant at this time (he joined the Catholic Church about 15 years later), suffered from a brief bout of depression during his college days. He insisted: "The book ... was not intended to describe the real world as it was, or as I thought it was, even when my thoughts were considerably less settled than they are now. It was intended to describe the world of wild doubt and despair which the pessimists were generally describing at that date; with just a gleam of hope in some double meaning of the doubt, which even the pessimists felt in some fitful fashion".

Chesterton later said that he had written this book to affirm that goodness and right were at the heart of every aspect of the world. However, the philosopher John Gray argues the story is more pessimistic than Christian:

Though some have tried to interpret The Man Who Was Thursday as a type of Christian allegory, the world it describes has more in common with the interminable labyrinth of Kafka's Castle. In the orderly Christian cosmos, in which Chesterton wanted to believe, nothing is finally tragic, still less absurd. The world is a divine comedy, the ultimate significance of which is never in doubt. In The Man Who Was Thursday, the world is illegible and may well be nonsensical. This was the nightmare he struggled, for the most part successfully, to forget. Producing a succession of wearisome polemics and mechanical paradoxes, he spent his life denying the vision that informed his greatest work.

== Adaptations ==
=== Mercury Theatre adaptation ===
On 5 September 1938 The Mercury Theatre on the Air presented an abridged radio-play adaptation, written by Orson Welles, who was a great admirer of Chesterton. He omitted most of Chapter 14: The Six Philosophers, which contains most of the metaphysical speculation. This was almost two months before the infamous War of the Worlds broadcast.

=== APJAC Productions musical adaptation ===
It was reported in January 1967 that Jerome Hellman and Arthur P. Jacobs's APJAC Productions were preparing movie projects including a musical adaptation of Chesterton's novel by Leslie Bricusse. The film was not made.

=== BBC radio adaptations ===
There have been at least three adaptations broadcast by BBC radio over the years.

On Sunday 13 July 1947, the BBC broadcast a live theatrical adaptation by Cecil Chesterton and Ralph Neale, which was produced by Jan Bussell and starred Harold Scott as Thursday, Peter Bull as Sunday, Stringer Davis as Comrade Witherspoon, Arnold Diamond as Colonel du Croix, Richard Goolden as Friday, and Campbell Singer as Wednesday.

A 90-minute adaptation was broadcast in 1975, dramatised by Ronald Barton and with John Samson as Thursday and Trevor Martin as Sunday. This adaptation was preserved in an off-air recording that was later discovered by the Radio Circle and re-broadcast on BBC Radio 4 Extra in 2024 as part of a strand called "Hidden Treasures".

In 1986 the BBC broadcast a four-part series dramatised by Peter Buckman and directed by Glyn Dearman. It featured Michael Hadley as Thursday/Gabriel Syme, Natasha Pyne as Rosamond and Edward de Souza as Wednesday/The Marquis de St. Eustache.

In 2005 the BBC broadcast the novel as read by Geoffrey Palmer, as thirteen half-hour parts. It has been re-broadcast several times since then, including in 2008 (one hundred years after first publication) 2016 and 2020.

=== 2016 film ===
Hungarian filmmaker Balázs Juszt wrote and directed a film inspired by the novel, starring François Arnaud, Ana Ularu, and Jordi Mollà, which premiered on 21 June 2016 at the Edinburgh Film Festival. Juszt's inspiration was his mentor, István Szabó.

== Popular culture ==
The 2000 video game Deus Ex features several excerpts from the book and lists Gabriel Syme as a current resident of the "Ton Hotel".

In Kim Newman's Anno Dracula: 1895, the Council of Days, led by Sunday, exists and is plotting to overthrow Dracula during the tenth anniversary of his rule over Britain. The Council includes Gabriel Syme, Peter the Painter (Friday), and Newman's recurring character Kate Reed.

In Neil Gaiman's The Sandman, The Man Who Was October—an unwritten sequel to The Man Who Was Thursday—appears in the Library of Dreams. Season of Mists ends with a quote from the fictional novel. In The Doll's House, the character Gilbert physically resembles G. K. Chesterton.

The novel heavily influenced the game Fallen London, in which the Revolutionary faction is led by the twelve-person "Calendar Council", who all take codenames after the months of the year rather than the days of the week.

In the first issue of the DC Comics series, Absolute Martian Manhunter, the book is seen on the nightstand next to John Jones' wife.
