= Vincent Yorke =

English cricketer

Vincent Wodehouse Yorke (21 May 1869 – 27 November 1957) was an English cricketer who played for Gloucestershire. He was born in Pimlico and died in Paddington.

Yorke was the son of John Reginald Yorke and Sophia Matilda de Tuyll de Serooskerken. He was a wealthy landowner and industrialist in Birmingham. He married Hon. Maud Evelyn Wyndham, daughter of the second Baron Leconfield.

He attended University of Cambridge, where E. F. Benson was a fellow student who fell in love with him. Benson wrote in his diary: "I feel perfectly mad about him just now...Ah, if only he knew, and yet I think he does."

Yorke made a single first-class appearance for the Gloucestershire team, during the 1898 season, against Lancashire. Batting in the middle of the order, Yorke scored 10 runs in the only innings in which he batted.

Yorke's first son was Philip Yorke, who died of leukaemia, allegedly as a result of sympathetic magic practised by George Orwell. The oldest son to survive to adulthood, Henry Vincent Yorke, an English author under the name Henry Green, best remembered for the novels Party Going, Living, and Loving. Yorke's second son, Gerald, made a single first-class appearance for the Gloucestershire team in 1925.
