= Hogarth Living Poets =

Book series

The Hogarth Living Poets were two series of books published by Hogarth Press, under the editorship of Dorothy Wellesley. The editions were limited, and the books are now rare.

== First Series (1928-1932) ==
24 books.

- 1. Frances Cornford Different Days
- 2. G. Fitzurse It Was Not Jones
- 3. Dorothy Wellesley Matrix
- 5. Ida Affleck Graves The China Cupboard and other poems
- 9. C. Day-Lewis Transitional Poem
- 10. William Plomer The Family Tree
- 11. Vita Sackville-West King's Daughter
- 14. Edwin Arlington Robinson Cavender's House
- 17. Dorothy Wellesley editor: A broadcast anthology of modern poetry
- 21. John Lehmann A Garden Revisited and other poems
- 22. C. Day-Lewis From Feathers to Iron
- 24. Michael Roberts editor New Signatures

== Second Series (1933-1937) ==
Five books.

- 1 C. Day-Lewis The Magnetic Mountain
- 2. John Lehmann The Noise of History
- 3. R. C. Trevelyan Beelzebub and other poem
