= The Everlasting Man =

1925 book by G. K. Chesterton

- First edition
- Author: G. K. Chesterton
- Genre: Christian apologetics
- Publisher: Hodder & Stoughton
- Publication date: 1925

The Everlasting Man is a Christian apologetics book written by G. K. Chesterton, published in 1925. It is, to some extent, a deliberate rebuttal of H. G. Wells's The Outline of History, disputing Wells's portrayals of human life and civilisation as a seamless development from animal life and of Jesus Christ as merely another charismatic figure. Chesterton detailed his own spiritual journey in Orthodoxy, but in this book he tries to illustrate the spiritual journey of humanity, or at least of Western civilisation.

== Overview ==
According to the evolutionary outlines of history proposed by Wells and others, mankind is simply another sort of animal, and Jesus was a remarkable human being, and nothing more. Chesterton's thesis, as expressed in Part I of the book ('On the Creature Called Man'), is that if man is really and dispassionately viewed simply as another animal, one is forced to the conclusion that he is a bizarrely unusual animal. In Part II ('On the Man Called Christ'), Chesterton argues that if Jesus is really viewed as simply another human leader and Christianity and the Church are simply another human religion, one is forced to the conclusion that he was a bizarrely unusual leader, whose followers founded a bizarrely and miraculously unusual religion and Church. "I do not believe," he says, "that the past is most truly pictured as a thing in which humanity merely fades away into nature, or civilization merely fades away into barbarism, or religion fades away into mythology, or our own religion fades away into the religions of the world. In short I do not believe that the best way to produce an outline of history is to rub out the lines."

== Influence on C. S. Lewis ==
C. S. Lewis wrote that, reading The Everlasting Man, he "saw the whole Christian outline of history set out in a form that seemed to me to make sense". In a 1950 letter to Sheldon Vanauken, Lewis called the book "the best popular apologetic I know", and in 1947 he wrote to Rhonda Bodle: "the [very] best popular defence of the full Christian position I know is G. K. Chesterton's The Everlasting Man". The book was also cited by The Christian Century in a list of 10 books that "most shaped [Lewis's] vocational attitude and philosophy of life".
