= John Banting =

English artist and writer

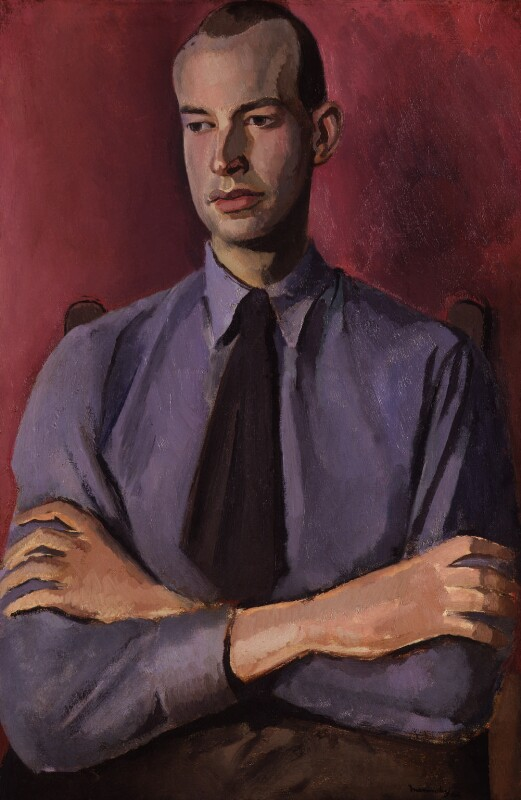
Banting in 1924, portrait by Bernard Meninsky, National Gallery

John Banting (12 May 1902 – 30 January 1972) was an English Surrealist artist and writer associated with the Bloomsbury Group, whose left-wing philosophy was reflected in much of his work. According to his Times obituary, he was "an artist who adopted surrealist conventions for satirical purposes". Anthony Powell regarded him as "the only true English Surrealist painter".

== Education and Bloomsbury ==
Born in Chelsea, Banting was educated at Chipping Campden School and initially influenced by vorticism. From 1921 he attended art classes at Vincent Square art school under Bernard Meninsky, and later at the free academies in Paris. By 1925, he had his own studio in Fitzroy Street. He joined the London Group and exhibited at the Seven and Five Society.

Banting first gained wider notice in the 1920s through his work on book jackets with Leonard and Virginia Woolf's Hogarth Press, and also as the designer of the ballet set for Constant Lambert's Pomona (1926) at the Cambridge Theatre. He also provided the cover for the score of Pomona, and for Lambert's later choral work The Rio Grande in 1929. While in Paris in 1930 he met some of the key figures of the surrealist movement, and their influence was reflected in his 1931 exhibition at the Wertheim Gallery.

== Surrealism and activism ==
Michael Robinson has pointed to the satire of form and formality as a key aspect of Banting's surrealist work. He contributed to the London International Surrealist Exhibition in 1936 and worked on various projects, commercial and artistic, ranging from an advertisement for Shell Oil to sets and costumes for the Camargo Society ballet Prometheus (1936) at Sadler's Wells. In 1938 he was invited to contribute to the Exposition Internationale du Surréalisme in Paris by Marcel Duchamp, and this led to a solo surrealist exhibition at the Storran Gallery in October 1938.

Banting's association with Nancy Cunard and the poet Brian Howard marked his increasing political awareness. He visited Harlem with Cunard in 1931 to investigate racial politics and civil rights, and contributed poems to her Negro Anthology (1935). Also with Cunard he visited Spain in October 1937 during the Civil War, attempting to join the (then disbanding) International Brigade in Madrid and meeting Ernest Hemingway. The following year he was arrested in Innsbruck, attempting to intervene during the Anschluss. He was a central figure influencing the increasingly left-wing political stance of the British Surrealist Group in the pre-war period.

During the war he worked as an art director for the Ministry of Information's Strand Films unit alongside Dylan Thomas and Curtis Moffat, while also acting as art editor for the left wing monthly magazine Our Time, and contributing to Nancy Cunard's anthology Salvo for Russia (1942).

== Post-war ==
After the war Banting found himself struggling to make a living, but was helped by a grant from the Artists Benevolent Fund, organised by his friend Julian Trevelyan who dubbed him "the eternal outsider". One continuing outlet for his art after the war was book jacket design. In 1946, he published A Blue Book of Conversation, a collection of illustrated satirical poems. In the 1950s he moved to Rye, East Sussex, near to his friend Edward Burra. He later moved on to Hastings, where he spent much of his time writing.

He died there in January 1972, aged 69, just as a solo exhibition at London's Hamet Gallery was reviving interest in his work. There was a posthumous exhibition at the Edward Harvane Gallery in March 1972.

== Works ==
- Figure with Heart, 1930
- Explosion, 1931
- Snake in The Grass, 1931
- Triplets, 1932
- Her Ladyship Rewarded, 1933
- One Man Band, 1934
- Negro Guitarist, 1935
- Seven Figured Exercise, 1940

Selected book jackets

- E.M. Forster. A letter to Madan Blanchard (Hogarth Press, 1931)
- Christopher Isherwood. Memorial: Portrait of a Family (Hogarth Press, 1932)
- John Lehmann. The Noise of History (Hogarth Press, 1934)
- Osbert Sitwell and Margaret Barton. Brighton (Faber & Faber, 1935)
- Fritz Faulkner. Windless Sky (Hogarth Press, 1936)
- Naomi Mitchison and Richard Crossman. Socrates (Hogarth Press, 1937)
- Henry Green. Party Going (Hogarth Press, 1939)
- Julian MacLaren-Ross. Bitten by the Tarantula (Allan Wingate, 1945)
- Julian MacLaren-Ross. The Nine Men of Soho (Allan Wingate, 1946)
- Lawrence Evelyn Jones. A La Carte (Secker & Warburg, 1951)
- Philip Toynbee. The Garden to the Sea (Macgibbon & Kee, 1953)
- Bernard Gutteridge. The Agency Game (Weidenfeld & Nicolson, 1954)
- Speed Lamkin. The Easter Egg Hunt (Weidenfeld & Nicolson, 1954)
- Mario Rigoni Stern. The Sergeant in the Snow (Macgibbon & Kee, 1954)
