= Hogarth Press =

British publishing house

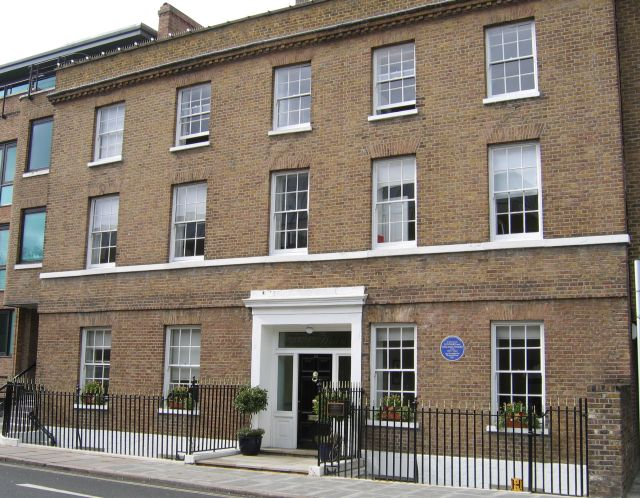
- Hogarth House, 34 Paradise Road, Richmond, London
- Parent company: Penguin Random House
- Status: Acquired
- Founded: 1917
- Founder: Leonard Woolf and Virginia Woolf
- Defunct: 1946
- Successor: Chatto & Windus and Crown Publishing Group
- Country of origin: United Kingdom
- Headquarters location: London
- Publication types: Books
- Official website: www.randomhousebooks.com/imprint/hogarth-books/ (United States) www.penguin.co.uk/company/publishers/vintage/hogarth.html (United Kingdom)

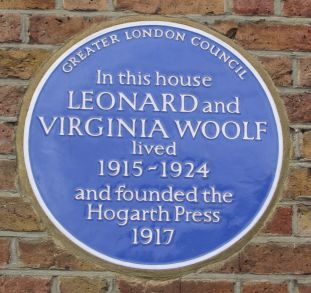
Blue plaque

The Hogarth Press is a book publishing imprint of Penguin Random House that was founded as an independent company in 1917 by British authors Leonard Woolf and Virginia Woolf. It was named after their house in Richmond (then in Surrey and now in London), where they began hand-printing books as a hobby during the interwar period.

Hogarth originally published the works of many members of the Bloomsbury Group, and was at the forefront of publishing works on psychoanalysis and translations of foreign works, especially Russian.

In 1938, Virginia Woolf relinquished her interest in the business and it was then run as a partnership by Leonard Woolf and John Lehmann until 1946, when it became an associate company of Chatto & Windus. In 2011, Hogarth Press was relaunched as an imprint for contemporary fiction in a partnership between Chatto & Windus in the United Kingdom and Crown Publishing Group in the United States, which had both been acquired by Random House.

== History ==
Printing began as a hobby for the Woolfs, and it provided a diversion for Virginia when writing became too stressful. The couple bought a handpress in 1917 for £19 (equivalent to about £1295 in 2018) and taught themselves how to use it. The press was set up in the dining-room of Hogarth House, where the Woolfs lived, lending its name to the publishing company they founded. In July 1917, they published their first text, Two Stories, a book with one story written by Leonard and another written by Virginia.

From these origins as a "little press", by the late 1920s the Hogarth Press had become a larger operation, using commercial printers and distributing to an international readership, with some of its bestsellers printed in the tens of thousands.

Between 1917 and 1946, the Press published 527 titles. It moved to Tavistock Square in 1924.

Sales and profitability

Number of publications by year from 1917 to 1946
Year	1917	1918	1919	1920	1921	1922	1923	1924	1925	1926	1927	1928	1929	1930	1931	1932	1933	1934	1935	1936	1937	1938	1939	1940	1941	1942	1943	1944	1945	1946
Titles published	1	2	5	3	6	9	14	14	28	31	42	30	30	30	34	36	20	21	24	23	20	17	23	12	13	12	7	10	4	4

Profit generated by the Hogarth Press publication (without bonuses and salaries)
Year	1917–18	1919	1920	1921	1922	1923	1924	1925	1926	1927	1928	1929	1930	1931	1932	1933	1934	1935	1936	1937	1938
Profit	£13 8s 8d	£13 14s 2d	£68 19s 4d	£25 5s 6d	£10 6s 4d	£5 7s 8d	£3 17s 0d	£73 1s 1.5d	£26 19s 1d	£64 2s 0d	£380 16s 0d	£580 14s 8d	£2,373 4s 2.5d	£2,209 0s 1.5d	£1,693 4s 1d	£929 15s 2.5d	£516 13s 0d	£598 7s 2d	£84 5s 0d	£2,422 18s 5d	£35 7s 7d

== Series ==
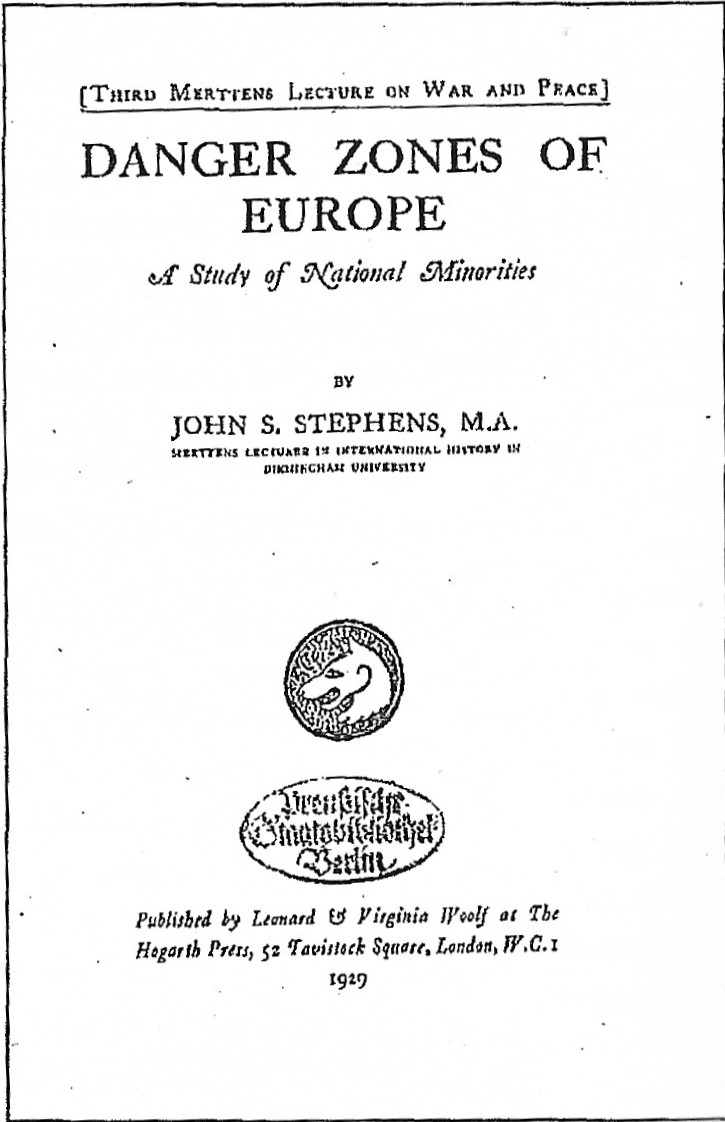
The frontispiece of a publication from 1929 with Hogarth's official logo portraying the head of a wolf

The Hogarth Press produced a number of publication series that were affordable as well as being attractively bound and printed, and usually commissioned from well known authors. These include the initial Hogarth Essays in three series 1924–1947 (36 titles), Hogarth Lectures on Literature (2 series 1927–1951), Merttens Lectures on War and Peace (8 titles 1927–1936), Hogarth Living Poets (29 titles 1928–1937), Day to Day Pamphlets (1930–1939), Hogarth Letters (12 titles 1931–1933) and World-Makers and World-Shakers (4 titles 1937).

The Essays were the first series produced by the press and include works by Virginia Woolf, Leonard Woolf and Gertrude Stein. Virginia Woolf's defence of modernism, Mr. Bennett and Mrs. Brown (1924), was the initial publication in the series. Cover illustrations were by Woolf's sister Vanessa Bell. Bell also designed book jackets for all of Woolf's books that were published by Hogarth Press.

The Letters are less well known, and are epistolary in form. Authors include E. M. Forster and Virginia Woolf. Woolf's A Letter to a Young Poet (1932) was number 8, and was addressed to John Lehmann as an exposition on modern poetry. Cover illustrations were by John Banting. In 1933, the entire series was reissued as a single volume, and is available on the Internet Archive in a 1986 edition.

1. A letter to Madam Blanchard, E. M. Forster (1931)
2. A letter to an M.P. on disarmament, Robert Gascoyne-Cecil, 1st Viscount Cecil of Chelwood (1931)
3. A letter to a sister, Rosamond Lehmann (1931)
4. The French pictures: a letter to Harriet, Robert Mortimer and John Banting (1932)
5. A letter from a black sheep, Francis Birrell (1932)
6. A letter to W. B. Yeats, L. A. G. Strong (1932)
7. A letter to a grandfather, Rebecca West (1933)
8. A letter to a young poet, Virginia Woolf (1932)
9. A letter to a modern novelist, Hugh Walpole (1932)
10. A letter to an archbishop, J. C. Hardwick (1932)
11. A letter to Adolf Hitler, Louis Golding (1932)
12. A letter to Mrs. Virginia Woolf, Peter Quennell (1932)

== Notable title history ==
- Paris: A Poem (1920) by Hope Mirrlees
- Twelve Original Woodcuts (1921), a portfolio by Roger Fry hand-printed by the Woolfs.
- Monday or Tuesday (1921) by Virginia Woolf, with woodcuts by Vanessa Bell
- Jacob's Room (1922) by Virginia Woolf; the first of her novels published by The Hogarth Press
- The Devils (1922) by Fyodor Dostoyevsky – co-translated by Virginia Woolf
- The Waste Land by T. S. Eliot (1923) – first UK book edition
- The Common Reader (1925) by Virginia Woolf
- Karn (1922) and Martha Wish-You-Ill (1926) – poetry by Ruth Manning-Sanders
- Orlando (1928) by Virginia Woolf
- Living (1929) by Henry Green
- A Room of One's Own (1930) by Virginia Woolf
- The Waves (1931) by Virginia Woolf
- In a Province (1934) – first book by Laurens van der Post
- What I Believe (1939) by E. M. Forster
- Party Going (1939) by Henry Green
- Twilight in Delhi (1940) by Ahmed Ali
- Loving by Henry Green (1945)
- The Standard Edition of the Complete Psychological Works of Sigmund Freud (1956–1974), general-edited and translated by James Strachey, in collaboration with Anna Freud
- The Four Fundamental Concepts of Psychoanalysis (1977) by Jacques Lacan, his first published Seminar.

== The Hogarth Shakespeare Project ==
In 2015, Hogarth Press began producing a series of modern retellings of William Shakespeare plays, known as the Hogarth Shakespeare Project, for which it hired a variety of authors:

1. The Gap of Time (based on The Winter's Tale), Jeanette Winterson (published 2015)
2. Shylock is my Name (based on The Merchant of Venice), Howard Jacobson (published 2016)
3. Vinegar Girl (based on The Taming of the Shrew), Anne Tyler (published 2016)
4. Hag-Seed (based on The Tempest), Margaret Atwood (published 2016)
5. New Boy (based on Othello), Tracy Chevalier (published 2017)
6. Dunbar (based on King Lear), Edward St Aubyn (published 2017)
7. Macbeth (based on Macbeth), Jo Nesbo (published 2018)

== Bibliography ==
- "Hogarth Press: The Series". Special Collections Department. University of Delaware Library. 2010. Archived from the original on 10 April 2018.
- Gaither, Mary E. "The Hogarth Press 1917–1946" pp. xvii–xxxiv in J. Howard Woolmer (1986), A checklist of the Hogarth Press 1917–1946, Woolmer Brotherson Ltd. ISBN 0-906795-38-9.
- Jaillant, Lise (2017). "'Classics behind plate glass': The Hogarth Press and the Uniform Edition of the Works of Virginia Woolf". Cheap Modernism: Expanding Markets, Publishers' Series and the Avant-Garde. Edinburgh University Press. pp. 120–139.
- Jaillant, Lise (17 April 2017). Cheap Modernism: Expanding Markets, Publishers' Series and the Avant-Garde. Edinburgh University Press. ISBN 978-1-4744-1724-2.
- Kennedy, Richard. A Boy at the Hogarth Press (1972. Whittington Press), Hesperus Press Ltd. ISBN 978-184391-461-7
- Lee, Hermione, ed. (1986). The Hogarth Letters. Athens, Georgia: University of Georgia Press.
- Southworth, Helen, ed. (2012). Leonard and Virginia Woolf, The Hogarth Press and the Networks of Modernism. Edinburgh University Press. ISBN 978-0-7486-6921-9.
- Spater, George; Ian Parsons, A Marriage of True Minds: An Intimate Portrait of Leonard and Virginia Woolf (1977. London: Jonathan Cape). Harvest/HBJ paperback. ISBN 0-15-657299-0
- Willis, J. H. (1992), Leonard and Virginia Woolf as Publishers: The Hogarth Press, 1917–41, University Press of Virginia. ISBN 0-8139-1361-6.
- Woolf, Virginia (1932). A Letter to a Young Poet. The Hogarth Letters. Vol. 8. Hogarth Press.
- Woolf, Leonard; Woolf, Virginia, eds. (1933). The Hogarth Letters. Hogarth Press.
- Woolmer, J. Howard. "Publications of The Hogarth Press" pp. 3–178 in J. Howard Woolmer (1986), A checklist of the Hogarth Press 1917–1946, Woolmer Brotherson Ltd. ISBN 0-906795-38-9.
- Woolmer, J. Howard. A Checklist of the Hogarth Press, 1917–1938 (1976) [With a short history of the press by Mary E. Gaither] Woolmer/Brotherson, 1986, 250 p.: ISBN 0-913506-17-6 (compare Hogarth Press Publications, 1917–1946 at Duke University Library that uses the numbering of the Woolmer publication)
