= The Napoleon of Notting Hill =

1904 G. K. Chesterton novel

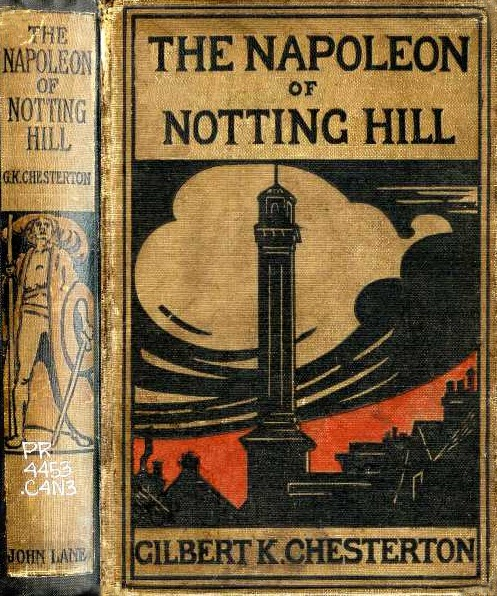
- cover of The Napoleon of Notting Hill
- Author: G. K. Chesterton
- Language: English
- Genre: Speculative fiction, political satire
- Publisher: Bodley Head (first edition)
- Publication date: 1904
- Publication place: United Kingdom
- Media type: Print (hardcover)
- Pages: 300 pp
- ISBN: 0-486-26551-X (recent edition)
- OCLC: 22346022
- Dewey Decimal: 823/.912 20
- LC Class: PR4453.C4 N3 1991

The Napoleon of Notting Hill is a novel written by G. K. Chesterton in 1904, set in a nearly unchanged London in 1984.

Although the novel is set in the future, it is, in effect, set in an alternative reality of Chesterton's own period, with no advances in technology nor changes in the class system or attitudes of the time. It postulates an impersonal government, not described in any detail, but apparently content to operate through a figurehead king, who is randomly chosen.

== Synopsis ==
The dreary succession of randomly selected Kings of England is broken up when Auberon Quin, who cares for nothing but a good joke, is chosen. To amuse himself, he institutes elaborate costumes for the provosts of the districts of London. All are bored by the King's antics except for one earnest young man who takes the cry for regional pride seriously – Adam Wayne, the eponymous Napoleon of Notting Hill.

== Influence ==
Michael Collins, who led the fight for Ireland's secession from the United Kingdom, is known to have admired the book. There has been speculation that the setting of the book prompted the date chosen for the setting of George Orwell's Nineteen Eighty-Four; the Japanese translation of the book, the cover of which was illustrated by Hayao Miyazaki, bore the primary title Chesterton's 1984. The novel is also quoted at the start of Neil Gaiman's novel Neverwhere.

Both this novel and Chesterton's The Man Who Was Thursday are referenced in the 2000 video game Deus Ex.
