= Living (novel) =

1929 novel by Henry Green

- First edition
- Author: Henry Green
- Language: English
- Publisher: J. M. Dent (UK); E. P. Dutton (US)
- Publication date: 1929
- Publication place: United Kingdom
- Media type: Print
- Pages: 269

Living is a 1929 novel by English writer Henry Green. It is a work of sharp social observation, documenting the lives of Birmingham factory workers in the interwar boom years. It is considered a modern classic by scholars, and appears on many university syllabi. The language is notable for its deliberate lack of conjunctives to reflect a Birmingham accent. As well, very few articles are used, allegedly to mimic foreign languages (such as Arabic) that use them infrequently. It is considered a work of Modernist literature.

The novel has been acclaimed for making Green "an honorary member of a literary movement to which he never belonged", i.e. the genre of proletarian literature. Despite his class origin and politics, the novel has been acclaimed as "closer to the world of the working class than those of some socialist or worker-writers themselves".

== Plot ==
Living tells the story of several iron foundry workers in the West Midlands city of Birmingham, England in the 1920s. It also follows, though in much less detail, the lives of the foundry's owners and, in particular, their social living. The key narrative progressions centre on Lily Gates, the novel's female protagonist, and her courting with Bert Jones, one of the factory workers. They seek an opportunity to escape the British working-class existence by travelling abroad. Crucial to their attempted elopement is Lily's desire to work. She is constantly stifled in this venture by the man she calls 'Grandad', Craigan, who is her father's best friend and with whom she lives. Craigan tells Lily that ' "[n]one o' the womanfolk go to work from the house I inhabit' ". This represents the male hierarchy's imposed ownership on everything physical and even metaphysical—Lily's freedom—in addition to the impossibility to seek an escape route. This is the struggle that drives the novel, and is one of the reasons it is considered Modernist.

While Bert and Lily's trajectory is away from Birmingham, Young 'Dick' Dupret's novelistic journey takes him toward Birmingham and the factory there. His father falls ill during the novel and dies, leaving the business to his son. There are many disputes between Dupret and Mr Bridges in particular, who is the factory's works manager and fulfils the day-to-day running duties of the factory. Mr Bridges fears for his job as Dupret seeks to reorganise the factory and its workers. Indeed, he retires the dozen or so workers who are within just a few months of the national pension age. Again, the shifting world and entropic status of the factory and the workers places the novel in its Modernist category.

One of the competing story-lines between Dupret and Lily is their mutual attempts at finding partners for marriage. Neither are successful, and their respective failures are indicative of the constraints that social norms and the status quo place upon people of both working and upper classes.

When Lily and Bert finally elope, much to the chagrin of Craigan and Joe Gates—Lily's father—they get as far as Liverpool where Bert's parents live. Lily and Bert, however, fail to find his parents and Bert abandons Lily, leaving her with her suitcase near to the tramline where she can hitch a ride back to the train station. Her return home represents the impossibility of women's full emancipation in the de facto world, even though two Representation of the People acts had been passed since the Great War (in 1918 and 1928) which enfranchised women with increasing levels of suffrage.

Lily returns ashamedly to her Birmingham home after the failed elopement, increasingly certain that a woman's role was in the domestic space at home. However, Craigan's illness has made him realise that he needs her perhaps more than she needs him. In this way, this Modernist text encapsulates the changing interwar world in Britain by demonstrating the problems encountered in the British class-system and in its de facto (if no longer de jure) patriarchy; but it also offers an alternative and a sign of hope through it all. Lily embodies that hope and that possibility of a different future, even if the steps to women's emancipation are incremental and not as large as the juridical changes had hoped.
