= Loving (novel) =

1945 novel by Henry Green

- First edition
- Author: Henry Green
- Cover artist: John Piper
- Language: English
- Publisher: Hogarth Press
- Publication date: 1945
- Media type: Print
- Pages: 224

Loving is a 1945 novel by British writer Henry Green. Time included the novel in its TIME 100 Best English-language Novels from 1923 to 2005. One of his most admired works, Loving describes life above and below stairs in an Irish country house during the Second World War. In the absence of their employers, the Tennants, the servants enact their own battles and conflict amid rumours about the war in Europe, invading one another's provinces of authority to create an anarchic environment of self-seeking behaviour, pilfering, gossip and love.

In a 1958 interview in The Paris Review, Terry Southern asked Green about his inspiration for Loving. Green replied: "I got the idea of Loving from a manservant in the Fire Service during the war. He was serving with me in the ranks, and he told me he had once asked the elderly butler who was over him what the old boy most liked in the world. The reply was: 'Lying in bed on a summer morning, with the window open, listening to the church bells, eating buttered toast with c***y fingers.' I saw the book in a flash."

== Television film ==
An adaptation for a television film by Maggie Wadey was produced by the BBC and screened in 1996. It starred Mark Rylance and Georgina Cates.
