= Henry Green =

English novelist (1905–1973)

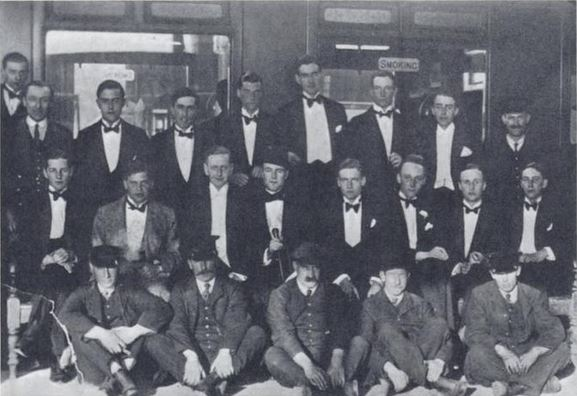
- Railway Club at Oxford, conceived by John Sutro, dominated by Harold Acton. Left to right, back: Henry Yorke, Roy Harrod, Henry Weymouth, David Plunket Greene, Harry Stavordale, Brian Howard. Middle row: Michael Rosse, John Sutro, Hugh Lygon, Harold Acton, Bryan Guinness, Patrick Balfour, Mark Ogilvie-Grant, Johnny Drury-Lowe; front: porters.
- Born: Henry Vincent Yorke; 29 October 1905; Tewkesbury, Gloucestershire, England
- Died: 13 December 1973 (aged 68)
- Education: New Beacon School
- Alma mater: Eton College
- Occupation: Author
- Spouse: Hon. Adelaide Biddulph
- Parent: Vincent Yorke (father)
- Writing career
- Notable work: Living; Party Going; Loving
- Literary movement: Modernism

Henry Vincent Yorke (29 October 1905 – 13 December 1973), who wrote under the pen name Henry Green, was an English writer best remembered for the novels Living (1929), Party Going (1939) and Loving (1945). He published a total of nine novels between 1926 and 1952. He is considered as one of the group designated in the 1920s/30s as the 'Bright Young Things' by the tabloid press.

== Life and work ==
Green was born near Tewkesbury, Gloucestershire, into an educated family with successful business interests. His father, Vincent Wodehouse Yorke, the son of John Reginald Yorke and Sophia Matilda de Tuyll de Serooskerken, was a wealthy landowner and industrialist in Birmingham. His mother, Hon. Maud Evelyn Wyndham, was daughter of the second Baron Leconfield. Green grew up in Gloucestershire and attended the New Beacon School in Sevenoaks. He then went to Eton College, where he became a friend of fellow pupil Anthony Powell and wrote most of his first novel, Blindness. He studied at Magdalen College, Oxford and there began a friendship and literary rivalry with Evelyn Waugh of Hertford College. At Oxford Yorke and Waugh were members of the Railway Club.

Green left Oxford in 1926 without taking a degree and returned to Birmingham to engage in his family business. He started by working with the ordinary workers on the factory floor of his family's factory, which produced beer-bottling machines, and later became the managing director. During this time he gained the experience to write Living, his second novel, which he worked on during 1927 and 1928. In 1929, he married his second cousin, the Hon. Adelaide Biddulph, also known as 'Dig'. They were both great-grandchildren of the first Baron Leconfield. Their son Sebastian was born in 1934. In 1940, Green published Pack My Bag, which he regarded as a nearly-accurate autobiography. During World War II, Green served as a fireman in the Auxiliary Fire Service. His wartime experiences are echoed in his novel Caught; they were also a strong influence on his subsequent novel, Back.

Green's last published novel was Doting (1952); this was the end of his writing career. In his later years, until his death in 1973, he became increasingly focused on studies of the Ottoman Empire, and became alcoholic and reclusive. Politically, Green was a traditional Tory throughout his life.

== Novels ==
Green's novels are important works of English modernist literature. His best-regarded novels are Living (1929), Party Going (1939), and Loving (1945) (now often published together).

Living documents the lives of Birmingham factory workers in the interwar boom years. The main plot concerns Lily Gates and her courting with Bert Jones, one of the factory workers. They seek an opportunity to escape the British working-class existence by travelling abroad. Crucial to their attempted elopement is Lily's desire to work. She is constantly stifled in this venture by the man she calls 'Grandad', Craigan, who is her father's best friend and with whom she lives. Another plotline concerns 'Dick' Dupret, the son of the factory owner. His father dies, leaving the business to his son. There are many disputes between Dupret and Mr Bridges, the factory foreman. Mr Bridges fears for his job as Dupret seeks to renovate the factory and its workers. The language of the novel is notable for its deliberate lack of definite articles to reflect a Birmingham accent. In addition, very few articles are used: "Noise of lathes working began again in this factory. Hundreds went along road outside, men and girls. Some turned into Dupret factory". Green later explained his reasons for using this technique: "I wanted to make that book as taut and spare as possible, to fit the proletarian life I was leading. So I hit on leaving out the articles."

Party Going tells the story of a group of wealthy people travelling by train to a house party. Due to fog, however, the train is much delayed and the group takes rooms in the adjacent large railway hotel. Almost all of the action of the story takes place in the hotel.

Loving describes life above and below stairs in an Irish country house during the Second World War. In the absence of their employers the Tennants, the servants enact their own battles and conflict amid rumours about the war in Europe. In an interview published in The Paris Review in 1958 Terry Southern asked Green about his inspiration for Loving. Green replied, "I got the idea of Loving from a manservant in the Fire Service during the war. He was serving with me in the ranks, and he told me he had once asked the elderly butler who was over him what the old boy most liked in the world. The reply was: 'Lying in bed on a summer morning, with the window open, listening to the church bells, eating buttered toast with cunty fingers.' I saw the book in a flash."

Back (1946) tells the story of Charley Summers, a young Englishman who comes back from Germany, where he was detained as a POW for three years after having been wounded in combat in France. Due to his wound, Charley's leg had to be amputated. While he was prisoner, Rose, the woman he loved, died; moreover, Rose was married to another man, so Charley cannot even express his bereavement for fear of scandal. Charley calls on Rose's father, Mr Grant, who encourages him to make acquaintance with a young widow. When he does, he is astonished at the uncanny resemblance between the woman, whose name is Nancy Whitmore, and Rose. He discovers that Nancy is the illegitimate daughter of Mr Grant, who sent Charley to her thinking he might console her for the death of her husband, an RAF pilot killed in action. The rest of the novel describes the complex and troubled relation between Charley and Nancy, as it unfolds against the background of a war-torn Britain.

Green had his own opinion of what writing should be: "Prose is not to be read aloud but to oneself alone at night, and it is not quick as poetry but rather a gathering web of insinuations [...] Prose should be a direct intimacy between strangers with no appeal to what both may have known. It should slowly appeal to fears unexpressed, it should in the end draw tears out of the stone."

== Reception ==
In the introduction to his interview with Green in the Paris Review Terry Southern wrote: "An ancient trade compliment, to an author whose technique is highly developed, has been to call him a 'writer's writer'; Henry Green has been referred to as a 'writer's writer's writer.'" Green was always more popular among fellow authors than with the general public; none of his books sold more than 10,000 copies, although he was more widely read in the 1940s, when Loving appeared briefly on US best-seller lists. He was admired in his lifetime by W. H. Auden, Christopher Isherwood, Eudora Welty, Anthony Burgess, Evelyn Waugh (who knew him well), and Rebecca West. The last-named said of him, "He was a truly original writer, his prose was fresh minted, he drove his bloodless scalpel inches deeper into the brain and heart, none of it had been said before. He is nearly forgotten." V. S. Pritchett called Green "the most gifted prose writer of his generation". In a 1952 profile of Green published by Life, W. H. Auden was quoted as saying that Henry Green was "the best English novelist alive".

After his death Green's works went out of print and were little-read. However, since the early 1990s there have been attempts to revive his reputation. In 1993 Surviving, a collection of previously unpublished works, edited by his grandson Matthew Yorke, was published by Viking Press. Other works have been reissued. Many contemporary authors have cited him as an influence, including John Updike, writing, "His novels made more of a stylistic impact upon me than those of any writer living or dead" in an introduction to an edition (Penguin Twentieth-Century Classics USA, 1993) of three of Green's novels (Living, Loving and Party Going). The novelist Sebastian Faulks, who also wrote an introduction to an edition (Vintage Classics UK, 2005) of these three novels, calls Green "unique" and says: "No fiction has ever thrilled me as the great moments in Living and Loving". David Lodge calls Green "an exceptionally gifted and truly original writer". In his essay The Genesis of Secrecy Frank Kermode discussed Green's novel Party Going and suggested that behind its realistic surface the book hides a complex network of mythical allusions. This led Kermode to include Green in the Modernist movement and to suggest that the novelist was strongly influenced by T.S. Eliot's idea of a "mythic method". Green's work has otherwise received comparatively little critical attention from academics; four of the few academics engaged with Green's work are Rod Mengham, author of The Idiom of the Time: The Writings of Henry Green (2010), Nick Shepley, author of Henry Green: Class, Style, and the Everyday (Oxford University Press, 2016) Jeremy Treglown, author of Romancing: The Life and Work of Henry Green (Faber and Faber, 2000), and Becci Carver, author of Granular Modernism (Oxford University Press, 2015). New York Review Books has reprinted eight of Green's novels.

Edwin Frank, editor of the New York Review of Books, said Green was "one of the 20th century's great unpeggable originals, each of whose novels (each of whose sentences, you could even say) takes off for new and unexpected places". Frank said his favourite book was Back.

== Bibliography ==
- Blindness (1926)
- Living (1929)
- Party Going (1939)
- Pack My Bag: A Self-Portrait (1940)
- Caught (1943)
- Loving (1945)
- Back (1946)
- Concluding (1948)
- Nothing (1950)
- Doting (1952)
- Surviving: The Uncollected Writings of Henry Green (posthumous, 1992)

=== Compilations ===
- Loving; Living; Party Going (Penguin, 1978; Picador, 1982; Vintage, 2005)
- Nothing; Doting; Blindness (Penguin, 1980; Picador, 1979; Vintage, 2008)
- Caught; Back; Concluding (Vintage, 2016)
