= List of parliamentary constituencies in Salford =

The Salford area of Greater Manchester has been represented in the House of Commons of the Parliament of the United Kingdom through several parliamentary constituencies:

	1832–1885	1885–1950	1950–1983	1983–1997	1997–2010	2010—
Salford	1832–1885				1997–2010	
Salford and Eccles						2010—
Salford East			1950–1997			
Salford North		1885–1950				
Salford South		1885–1950				
Salford West		1885–1983				
