= Anne Cumming =

British writer and sexual adventurer (1917–1993)

- from picture with Brion Gysin: Author: Jules Colwell, 1981
- Born: 14 December 1917; Walton-on-Thames, Surrey, England
- Died: 28 August 1993 (aged 75); London, England
- Occupations: Public relations officer; translator; writer
- Spouses: Henry Lyon Young (m. 1938; div. 1948) Richard Mason (m. 1948; sep. 1958)
- Writing career
- Genre: Autobiographical
- Subjects: love and sex

Anne Cumming (the pen name of Felicity Anne Cumming Mason, 14 December 1917 – 28 August 1993) was an English writer, translator, public relations officer and polyamorist.

== Biography ==
=== Early life ===
Cumming was born in Walton-on-Thames in 1917, to parents Howard Cumming and Eileen Groves, in an upper-middle-class family. She had an indulgent childhood courtesy of her grandfather, James Grimble Groves, a brewery owner and a Conservative member of parliament for Salford South. Cumming spent much of her childhood in South Africa, where her father had bought a farm.

She was a débutante in 1935 and she later reported that she first had sex under the Eiffel Tower. She studied contemporary dance and later acting at Dartington Hall in Devon with Michael Chekhov. She married a fellow student, Henry Lyon Young, in 1938. He was an aspiring playwright and later writer, as well as a relative of the Queen Mother.

She and her husband, along with Chekhov, left for the United States as war approached, intending to establish a drama school there to teach the Stanislavski method of acting.

== Career ==
During the war, they were recruited by British Intelligence, and eventually asked to leave New York and return to England. They were sent back by convoy and Cumming assisted with encrypting and decrypting coded messages between the British and American governments.

While in Greece, she worked as a translator for the British Council.

== Work ==
=== Acting ===
In 1963, she had a small part in Fellini's film 8½. In 1968, she appeared in the Italian comedy film The Girl Who Couldn't Say No where she played the mother of George Segal's character, Franco. A third film appearance was again for Fellini, this time in Roma.

In 1990, Cumming (credited as Felicity Mason) hosted a dinner party for guests Quentin Crisp, Robert Patrick and Susana Ventura (aka Penny Arcade) in the film Resident Alien.

=== Writing ===
Cumming wrote The Love Habit in 1977 and The Love Quest in 1991. She appeared topless in the British tabloid the Sunday Sport.

== Personal life ==
In 1948, she eloped with and later married the novelist Richard Mason. Richard and Felicity Mason separated in 1958 and were later divorced. Cumming had two children from her first marriage, but had no further children. Cumming had extramarital sexual partners in Britain, North Africa and the Middle East. During her marriage she had a longer relationship with the Italian designer Beni Montresor. This was encouraged by her husband and only ended when Montresor took an interest in another man.

In 1953, she started a platonic but deep relationship with the artist Brion Gysin. They had similar backgrounds and ages and were born in the same area. They referred to each other as brother and sister. Cumming helped to catalogue his paintings and, after he died in 1986, she arranged his funeral and for his ashes to be scattered at the Caves of Hercules in Morocco.

While a translator in Greece, she met the writer Francis King, who was also working for the British Council. She enjoyed observing his homosexual adventures.

Cumming discovered that she was HIV positive in 1986. She stayed in Britain to receive health care but she was keen to avoid publicity as she did not want to have her condition associated with her lifestyle. She became a social hostess introducing new talent to useful contacts.

== Death ==
Cumming died at the London Lighthouse in 1993, the same year as she appeared nude on British television in the first nude TV chat show.

== Works ==
- The Love Habit, 1978
- The Love Quest, 1991
