= 1935 Salford City Council election =

Local election in Salford

- 1 November 1935

16 of 64 seats on Salford City Council 33 seats needed for a majority
	First party	Second party	Third party
Party	Labour	Conservative	Independent
Last election	8 seats, 51.2%	7 seats, 42.8%	1 seats, 5.8%
Seats before	29	25	5
Seats won	8	5	3
Seats after	27	26	6
Seat change	▼2	▲1	▲1
Popular vote	24,803	15,332	8,730
Percentage	50.0%	30.9%	17.6%
Swing	▼1.2%	▼11.9%	▲11.8%
	Fourth party
Party	Liberal
Last election	0 seats, 0.0%
Seats before	5
Seats won	0
Seats after	5
Seat change	Steady
Popular vote	755
Percentage	1.5%
Swing	▲1.5%
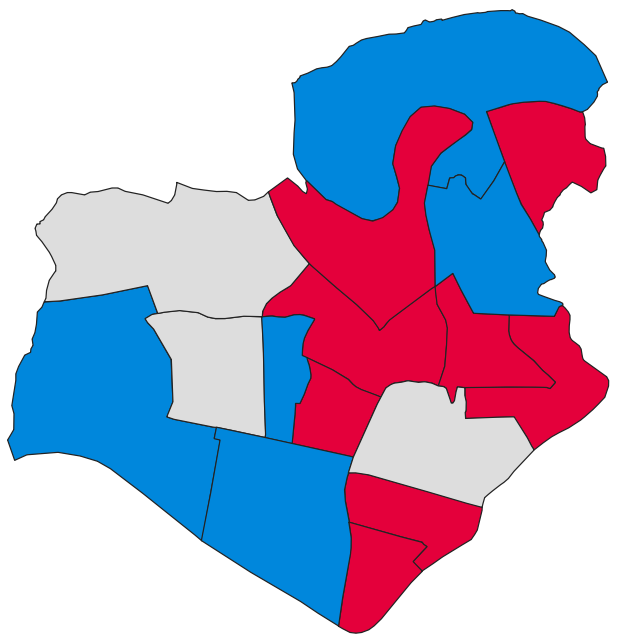
- Map of results of 1935 election
Leader of the Council before election
No overall control
Leader of the Council after election
No overall control

Elections to Salford City Council were held on Friday, 1 November 1935. One-third of the councillors seats were up for election, with each successful candidate to serve a three-year term of office. The council remained under no overall control.

== Election result ==
Party	Votes		Seats			Full Council	
Labour Party	24,803 (50.0%)	▼1.2	8 (50.0%)	8 / 16	▼2	27 (42.2%)	27 / 64
Conservative Party	15,332 (30.9%)	▼11.9	5 (31.3%)	5 / 16	▲1	26 (40.6%)	26 / 64
Independent	8,730 (17.6%)	▲11.8	3 (18.8%)	3 / 16	▲1	6 (9.4%)	6 / 64
Liberal Party	755 (1.5%)	▲1.5	0 (0.0%)	0 / 16	Steady	5 (7.8%)	5 / 64

=== Full council ===
↓
27	5	6	26

=== Aldermen ===
↓
2	5	1	8

=== Councillors ===
↓
25	5	18

== Ward results ==
=== Albert Park ===
Albert Park
Party	Candidate	Votes	%	±%
Conservative	T. Clarke*	1,881	56.4	+3.9
Labour	W. Wolfson	1,457	43.6	−3.9
Majority		424	12.8	+7.8
Turnout		3,338		
Conservative hold		Swing		

=== Charlestown ===
Charlestown
Party	Candidate	Votes	%	±%
Labour	S. W. Davis*	2,368	56.3	+3.8
Independent	T. H. Nightingale	1,838	43.7	N/A
Majority		530	12.6	+7.6
Turnout		4,206		
Labour hold		Swing		

=== Claremont ===
Claremont
Party	Candidate	Votes	%	±%
Independent	J. A. Turner*	2,174	70.4	N/A
Labour	H. Russell	914	29.6	−4.9
Majority		1,260	40.8	
Turnout		3,088		
Independent hold		Swing		

=== Crescent ===
Crescent
Party	Candidate	Votes	%	±%
Independent	Ald. J. Higginbottom*	1,833	50.6	N/A
Labour	A. Millwood*	1,790	49.4	−0.3
Majority		43	1.2	
Turnout		3,623		
Independent gain from Labour		Swing		

=== Docks ===
Docks
Party	Candidate	Votes	%	±%
Conservative	H. Johnson*	1,653	58.3	+5.5
Labour	W. Crosby	1,184	41.7	−5.5
Majority		469	16.6	+11.0
Turnout		2,837		
Conservative hold		Swing		

=== Kersal ===
Kersal
Party	Candidate	Votes	%	±%
Conservative	T. Mellor	1,696	66.2	N/A
Labour	L. A. Evans	867	33.8	N/A
Majority		829	32.4	N/A
Turnout		2,563		
Conservative hold		Swing		

=== Langworthy ===
Langworthy
Party	Candidate	Votes	%	±%
Conservative	C. R. V. Haynes	1,787	51.6	+2.3
Labour	P. Moulson*	1,673	48.4	−2.3
Majority		114	3.2	
Turnout		3,460		
Conservative gain from Labour		Swing		

=== Mandley Park ===
Mandley Park
Party	Candidate	Votes	%	±%
Labour	J. Park*	2,016	59.3	+9.7
Conservative	F. T. B. Luckman	1,381	40.7	−9.7
Majority		635	18.6	
Turnout		3,397		
Labour hold		Swing		

=== Ordsall Park ===
Ordsall Park
Party	Candidate	Votes	%	±%
Labour	T. Walsh*	1,985	62.0	−7.7
Conservative	J. W. Kinder	1,218	38.0	+7.7
Majority		767	24.0	−15.4
Turnout		3,203		
Labour hold		Swing		

=== Regent ===
Regent
Party	Candidate	Votes	%	±%
Labour	Ald. E. A. Hardy*	2,159	62.3	+0.7
Conservative	H. Hyman	1,308	37.7	−0.7
Majority		851	24.6	+1.4
Turnout		3,467		
Labour hold		Swing		

=== St. Matthias' ===
St. Matthias'
Party	Candidate	Votes	%	±%
Labour	J. A. Webb*	2,205	61.8	+0.7
Conservative	C. R. Bentley	1,361	38.2	N/A
Majority		844	23.6	−1.2
Turnout		3,566		
Labour hold		Swing		

=== St. Paul's ===
St. Paul's
Party	Candidate	Votes	%	±%
Labour	L. Webb*	1,423	65.3	+12.8
Liberal	W. H. J. Evans	755	34.7	N/A
Majority		668	30.6	+25.6
Turnout		2,178		
Labour hold		Swing		

=== St. Thomas' ===
St. Thomas'
Party	Candidate	Votes	%	±%
Labour	H. J. Vickers*	1,470	52.0	+0.1
Conservative	A. F. Carroll	1,359	48.0	−0.1
Majority		111	4.0	+0.2
Turnout		2,829		
Labour hold		Swing		

=== Seedley ===
Seedley
Party	Candidate	Votes	%	±%
Independent	W. F. Cuttiford*	1,670	68.9	+6.7
Labour	I. Copson	753	31.1	−6.7
Majority		917	37.8	+13.4
Turnout		2,423		
Independent hold		Swing		

=== Trinity ===
Trinity
Party	Candidate	Votes	%	±%
Labour	J. T. Tattersall*	1,519	55.6	+2.9
Independent	T. William Richardson	1,215	44.4	N/A
Majority		304	11.2	+5.8
Turnout		2,734		
Labour hold		Swing		

=== Weaste ===
Weaste
Party	Candidate	Votes	%	±%
Conservative	A. G. Wild*	1,688	62.3	+5.2
Labour	J. Openshaw	1,020	37.7	−5.2
Majority		668	24.6	+10.4
Turnout		2,708		
Conservative hold		Swing		

== Aldermanic elections ==
=== Aldermanic election, 9 November 1935 ===
At the meeting of the council on 9 November 1935, the terms of office of eight aldermen expired.

The following eight were elected as aldermen by the council on 9 November 1935 for a term of six years.

Party	Alderman	Ward	Term expires
Labour	Edward Arthur Hardy*		1941
Labour	James Henry Kearns		1941
Labour	Joseph Lemmon		1941
Labour	James Park		1941
Labour	George William Sands		1941
Labour	Thomas Walsh		1941
Labour	James Albert Webb		1941
Labour	Leonard Webb		1941

=== Aldermanic election, 5 February 1936 ===
Caused by the death on 22 January 1936 of Alderman George Billington (Conservative, elected as an alderman by the council on 6 June 1923).

In his place, Councillor William Hughes (Independent, Charlestown, elected 28 November 1935; previously 1891-1908, Alderman 1908-35) was elected as an alderman by the council on 5 February 1936.

Party	Alderman	Ward	Term expires
Independent	William Hughes		1938

== By-elections between 1935 and 1936 ==
=== By-elections, 28 November 1935 ===
Eight by-elections were held on 28 November 1935 to fill vacancies that were created by the appointment of aldermen on 9 November 1935.

==== Charlestown ====
Caused by the election as an alderman of Councillor James Henry Kearns (Labour, Charlestown, elected 1 November 1934; previously 1926-31) on 9 November 1935, following the defeat on 9 November 1935 of Alderman William Armstrong (Conservative, elected as an alderman by the council on 4 July 1934).

Charlestown
Party	Candidate	Votes	%	±%
Independent	W. Hughes	2,210	52.3	+8.6
Labour	K. M. Grant	2,019	47.7	−8.6
Majority		191	4.6	
Turnout		4,229		
Independent gain from Labour		Swing		

==== Mandley Park ====
Caused by the election as an alderman of Councillor James Park (Labour, Mandley Park, elected 1 November 1926) on 9 November 1935, following the defeat on 9 November 1935 of Alderman William Hughes (Liberal, elected as an alderman by the council on 6 May 1908).

Mandley Park
Party	Candidate	Votes	%	±%
Conservative	W. Greenwood	1,674	50.9	+10.2
Labour	J. Jackson	1,614	49.1	−10.2
Majority		60	1.8	
Turnout		3,288		
Conservative gain from Labour		Swing		

==== Ordsall Park ====
Caused by the election as an alderman of Councillor George William Sands (Labour, Ordsall Park, elected 1 November 1934; previously 1927-30) on 9 November 1935, following the defeat on 9 November 1935 of Alderman William Greenwood (Conservative, elected as an alderman by the council on 5 October 1927); and the election as an alderman of Councillor Thomas Walsh (Labour, Ordsall Park, elected 30 June 1925) on 9 November 1935, following the defeat on 9 November 1935 of Alderman Joseph Jackson (Liberal, elected as an alderman by the council on 6 April 1932).

Ordsall Park (2 vacancies)
Party	Candidate	Votes	%	±%
Labour	T. James	1,860	53.4	−8.6
Labour	F. J. Lynch	1,803	51.8	−10.2
Conservative	J. W. Kinder	1,666	47.9	+9.9
Independent	R. H. Wooler	1,632	46.9	N/A
Majority		137	3.9	−20.1
Turnout		3,481		
Labour hold		Swing		
Labour hold		Swing		

==== Regent ====
Caused by the election as an alderman of Councillor Edward Arthur Hardy (Labour, Regent, elected 1 November 1932; previously 1922-23 and 1923-31) on 5 June 1935, following the death on 26 April 1935 of Alderman Samuel Finburgh (Conservative, elected as an alderman by the council on 7 January 1931).

Regent
Party	Candidate	Votes	%	±%
Labour	A. Millwood	1,833	50.3	−12.0
Conservative	J. Clark	1,811	49.7	+12.0
Majority		22	0.6	−24.0
Turnout		3,644		
Labour hold		Swing		

==== St. Matthias' ====
Caused by the election as an alderman of Councillor James Albert Webb (Labour, St. Matthias', elected 1 November 1929) on 9 November 1935, following the defeat on 9 November 1935 of Alderman James Frederick Emery (Conservative, elected as an alderman by the council on 4 April 1934).

St. Matthias'
Party	Candidate	Votes	%	±%
Labour	R. Headon	1,590	52.3	−9.5
Independent	J. Clancy	1,449	47.7	N/A
Majority		141	4.6	−19.0
Turnout		3,039		
Labour hold		Swing		

==== St. Paul's ====
Caused by the election as an alderman of Councillor Leonard Webb (Labour, St. Paul's, elected 1 November 1926) on 9 November 1935, following the defeat on 9 November 1935 of Alderman James Higginbottom (Independent, elected as an alderman by the council on 6 January 1932).

St. Paul's
Party	Candidate	Votes	%	±%
Labour	P. Moulson	1,324	50.8	−14.5
Conservative	W. Soar	1,037	39.8	N/A
Liberal	W. H. J. Evans	243	9.4	−25.3
Majority		287	11.0	−19.6
Turnout		2,604		
Labour hold		Swing		

==== Trinity ====
Caused by the election as an alderman of Councillor Joseph Lemmon (Labour, Trinity, elected 1 November 1934; previously 1925-31) on 9 November 1935, following the defeat on 9 November 1935 of Alderman Joseph Willett (Liberal, elected as an alderman by the council on 25 October 1922).

Trinity
Party	Candidate	Votes	%	±%
Independent	T. William Richardson	1,464	57.3	+12.9
Labour	W. Crosby	1,089	42.7	−12.9
Majority		375	14.6	
Turnout		2,553		
Independent gain from Labour		Swing		

=== Charlestown, 12 March 1936 ===
Caused by the election as an alderman of Councillor William Hughes (Independent, Charlestown, elected 28 November 1935; previously 1891-1908, Alderman 1908-35) on 5 February 1936, following the death on 22 January 1936 of Alderman George Billington (Conservative, elected as an alderman by the council on 6 June 1923).

Charlestown
Party	Candidate	Votes	%	±%
Independent	T. H. Nightingale	1,484	50.7	−1.6
Labour	K. M. Grant	1,445	49.3	+1.6
Majority		39	1.4	−3.2
Turnout		2,929		
Independent hold		Swing		
