= 1932 Salford City Council election =

Local election in Salford

- 1 November 1932

16 of 64 seats on Salford City Council 33 seats needed for a majority
	First party	Second party	Third party
Party	Conservative	Labour	Liberal
Last election	13 seats, 55.3%	1 seats, 40.4%	0 seats, 0.0%
Seats before	35	11	10
Seats won	4	10	0
Seats after	34	12	10
Seat change	▼1	▲1	Steady
Popular vote	16,225	24,320	1,995
Percentage	35.2%	52.8%	4.3%
Swing	▼20.1%	▲12.4%	▲4.3%
	Fourth party
Party	Independent
Last election	2 seats, 4.1%
Seats before	8
Seats won	2
Seats after	8
Seat change	Steady
Popular vote	3,468
Percentage	7.5%
Swing	▲3.4%
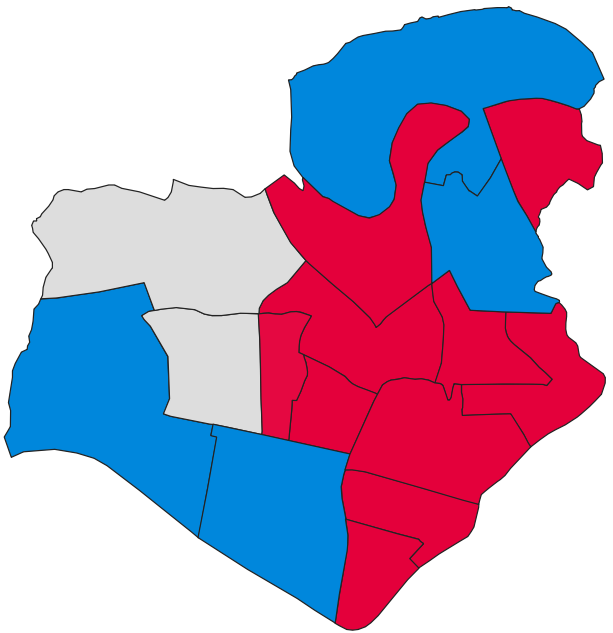
- Map of results of 1932 election
Leader of the Council before election
Conservative
Leader of the Council after election
Conservative

Elections to Salford City Council were held on Tuesday, 1 November 1932. One-third of the councillors seats were up for election, with each successful candidate to serve a three-year term of office. The Conservative Party retained overall control of the council.

== Election result ==
Party	Votes		Seats			Full Council	
Conservative Party	16,225 (35.2%)	▼20.1	4 (25.0%)	4 / 16	▼1	34 (53.1%)	34 / 64
Labour Party	24,320 (52.8%)	▲12.4	10 (62.5%)	10 / 16	▲1	12 (18.8%)	12 / 64
Liberal Party	1,995 (4.3%)	▲4.3	0 (0.0%)	0 / 16	Steady	10 (15.6%)	10 / 64
Independent	3,468 (7.5%)	▲3.4	2 (12.5%)	2 / 16	Steady	8 (12.5%)	8 / 64
Communist	80 (0.2%)	Steady	0 (0.0%)	0 / 16	Steady	0 (0.0%)	0 / 64

=== Full council ===
↓
12	10	8	34

=== Aldermen ===
↓
7	1	8

=== Councillors ===
↓
12	3	7	26

== Ward results ==
=== Albert Park ===
Albert Park
Party	Candidate	Votes	%	±%
Conservative	T. Clarke*	1,808	55.0	−15.8
Labour	A. Worthington	1,477	45.0	+15.8
Majority		331	10.0	−31.6
Turnout		3,285		
Conservative hold		Swing		

=== Charlestown ===
Charlestown
Party	Candidate	Votes	%	±%
Labour	J. F. Crane	2,542	58.4	+15.9
Liberal	A. Hodkinson	1,732	39.8	N/A
Communist	R. Davies	80	1.8	+0.6
Majority		810	18.6	
Turnout		4,354		
Labour hold		Swing		

=== Claremont ===
Claremont
Party	Candidate	Votes	%	±%
Independent	J. A. Turner*	1,764	73.7	N/A
Labour	J. Openshaw	631	26.3	+6.4
Majority		1,133	47.4	
Turnout		2,395		
Independent hold		Swing		

=== Crescent ===
Crescent
Party	Candidate	Votes	%	±%
Labour	A. Millwood*	2,209	58.5	+16.9
Conservative	A. H. Handslip	1,567	41.5	−16.9
Majority		642	17.0	
Turnout		3,776		
Labour hold		Swing		

=== Docks ===
Docks
Party	Candidate	Votes	%	±%
Conservative	H. Johnson	1,490	51.4	−8.8
Labour	W. Harvey	1,409	48.6	+8.8
Majority		81	2.8	−17.6
Turnout		2,899		
Conservative gain from Labour		Swing		

=== Kersal ===
Kersal
Party	Candidate	Votes	%	±%
Conservative	G. W. F. Hampshire*	uncontested		
Conservative hold		Swing		

=== Langworthy ===
Langworthy
Party	Candidate	Votes	%	±%
Labour	P. Moulson	1,706	53.9	+20.8
Conservative	G. Fearnehough*	1,460	46.1	−20.8
Majority		246	7.8	
Turnout		3,166		
Labour gain from Conservative		Swing		

=== Mandley Park ===
Mandley Park
Party	Candidate	Votes	%	±%
Labour	J. Park*	2,010	57.6	+17.3
Conservative	G. E. Hulse	1,478	42.4	−17.3
Majority		532	15.2	
Turnout		3,488		
Labour hold		Swing		

=== Ordsall Park ===
Ordsall Park
Party	Candidate	Votes	%	±%
Labour	T. Walsh*	2,536	66.9	+18.8
Conservative	W. Leicester	1,252	33.1	−17.8
Majority		1,284	33.8	
Turnout		3,788		
Labour hold		Swing		

=== Regent ===
Regent
Party	Candidate	Votes	%	±%
Labour	E. A. Hardy	2,591	64.6	+13.8
Conservative	H. Cooke	1,417	35.4	−10.7
Majority		1,174	29.2	+24.5
Turnout		4,008		
Labour hold		Swing		

=== St. Matthias' ===
St. Matthias'
Party	Candidate	Votes	%	±%
Labour	J. A. Webb*	uncontested		
Labour hold		Swing		

=== St. Paul's ===
St. Paul's
Party	Candidate	Votes	%	±%
Labour	L. Webb*	1,796	56.7	+17.7
Conservative	E. J. Appleby	1,107	35.0	−26.0
Liberal	J. G. Cran	263	8.3	N/A
Majority		689	21.7	
Turnout		3,166		
Labour hold		Swing		

=== St. Thomas' ===
St. Thomas'
Party	Candidate	Votes	%	±%
Labour	H. S. Vickers	1,733	52.0	+10.6
Conservative	W. Coop*	1,599	48.0	−10.6
Majority		134	4.0	
Turnout		3,332		
Labour gain from Conservative		Swing		

=== Seedley ===
Seedley
Party	Candidate	Votes	%	±%
Independent	W. F. Cuttiford*	1,704	64.8	N/A
Labour	W. Neil	927	35.2	N/A
Majority		777	29.6	N/A
Turnout		2,631		
Independent hold		Swing		

=== Trinity ===
Trinity
Party	Candidate	Votes	%	±%
Labour	J. T. Tattersall*	1,833	59.6	+10.4
Conservative	T. W. Gaskin	1,240	40.4	−10.4
Majority		593	19.2	
Turnout		3,073		
Labour hold		Swing		

=== Weaste ===
Weaste
Party	Candidate	Votes	%	±%
Conservative	T. Nuttall*	1,807	66.3	−8.6
Labour	I. Copson	920	33.7	+8.6
Majority		887	32.6	−17.2
Turnout		2,727		
Conservative hold		Swing		

== Aldermanic elections ==
=== Aldermanic elections, 9 November 1932 ===
At the meeting of the council on 9 November 1932, the terms of office of eight aldermen expired.

The following eight were elected as aldermen by the council on 9 November 1932 for a term of six years.

Party	Alderman	Ward	Term expires
Conservative	George Billington*		1938
Conservative	John Bratherton*	Docks	1938
Liberal	Ernest Desquesnes*		1938
Liberal	George Hindle*	Regent	1938
Conservative	Benjamin Littler*		1938
Conservative	W. S. Roberts*		1938
Liberal	John Rothwell*		1938
Conservative	Abraham Williamson*	St. Paul's	1938

=== Aldermanic election, 1 February 1933 ===
Caused by the death on 19 January 1933 of Alderman S. H. Lees (Conservative, elected as an alderman by the council on 26 October 1921).

In his place, Councillor Joseph Connolly (Liberal, Claremont, elected 1 November 1921) was elected as an alderman by the council on 1 February 1933.

Party	Alderman	Ward	Term expires
Liberal	Joseph Connolly		1935

== By-elections between 1932 and 1933 ==
=== Claremont, 20 February 1933 ===
Caused by the election as an alderman of Councillor Joseph Connolly (Liberal, Claremont, elected 1 November 1921) on 1 February 1933, following the death on 19 January 1933 of Alderman S. H. Lees (Conservative, elected as an alderman by the council on 26 October 1921).

Claremont
Party	Candidate	Votes	%	±%
Conservative	G. Fearnehough	1,182	71.6	N/A
Labour	J. Openshaw	468	28.4	+2.1
Majority		714	43.2	
Turnout		1,650		
Conservative gain from Liberal		Swing		
