= Henry Hoyle Howorth =

British politician and historian (1842–1923)

Sir Henry Hoyle Howorth KCIE FRS FSA
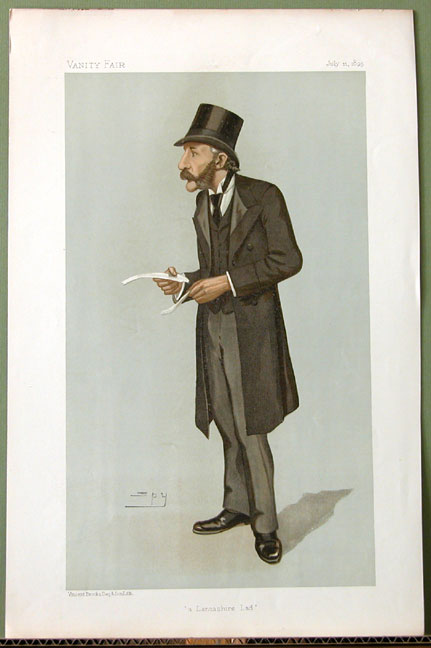
- "A Lancashire Lad". Caricature by Spy published in Vanity Fair (1895)
- Born: 1842; Lisbon, Portugal
- Died: 1923; London, UK
- Occupations: Politician; Barrister; Historian; Geologist
- Spouse: Katherine Brierley
- Children: Sir Rupert Howorth
- Relatives: Sir Edmund Ronald Leach (Grand-uncle)

Sir Henry Hoyle Howorth KCIE FRS FSA (1 July 1842 – 15 July 1923) was a British Conservative politician, barrister and amateur historian and geologist.

== Career ==
He was born in Lisbon, Portugal, the son of Henry Howorth, a merchant in that city. He was educated at Rossall School before studying law. He was called to the bar by the Inner Temple in 1867, and practised on the Northern Circuit. He was also the maternal great uncle of anthropologist Sir Edmund Ronald Leach.

He was a Unionist in politics, and was elected as Conservative Member of Parliament for Salford South in 1886. He was re-elected in 1892 and 1895 before retiring from the Commons at the 1900 general election.

Apart from the law and politics, Howorth was deeply interested in archaeology, history, numismatics and ethnography. He was a prolific writer, contributing articles to a number of journals.

In 1892 he was appointed a Knight Commander of the Indian Empire in recognition of his works on the history and ethnography of Asia. In 1893 he was made a Fellow of the Royal Society, against considerable opposition as he lacked any formal scientific education. He subsequently became Honorary Librarian of Chetham's College, Manchester, and a Trustee of the British Museum. He was also a Member of the Chetham Society, serving as a Member of Council from 1877 until 1900. He was also a Member of the Manchester Literary and Philosophical Society and a Freemason.

Howorth was a controversialist, frequently airing his opinions on the letters page of The Times, sometimes under the pseudonym "A Manchester Conservative". He married Katherine Brierley in 1869 and they had three sons, one of whom was Sir Rupert Howorth. His wife predeceased him in 1921. Sir Henry Howorth died in July 1923 aged 81, and was buried in Putney Vale Cemetery.

== Catastrophism ==
Howorth rejected the uniformitarianism of James Hutton and Charles Lyell. He attacked the ice age theory in his book The Mammoth and the Flood (1887). He defended a form of neo-diluvialism, that catastrophic floods had devastated large areas of the earth.

He did not believe in a global flood and considered the biblical deluge just one of many flood myths to support his theory. He used geological evidence to support his theory in The Glacial Nightmare and the Flood (1893). In 1905, he wrote another book Ice or Water that attempted to refute the glacial theory in detail. Professional geologists were not convinced by his theory.

== Works ==
The books and journals he authored summarise his vast areas of interest:

On Mongolia:

- H.H. Howorth (霍渥斯), History of the Mongols (in three-volumes, 1876–88):
  - The Mongols proper and the Kalmuks ... with 2 maps by E.G. Ravenstein (蒙古史) (reprint ed.). 文殿閣書莊. 1888.
  - History of the Mongols: The Mongols proper and the Kalmuks: Part I
  - History of the Mongols, from the 9th to the 19th Century: Part I
  - History of the Mongols from the 9th to the 19th Century: Part III: The Mongols of Persia. London and New York: Longman, Green, and Co. 1888.
- H.H. Howorth, History of Chinghis Khan and his Ancestors.
- H.H. Howorth, "The Spread of the Slaves, Part III: The Northern Serbs or Sorabians and the Obodoiti", The Journal of the Anthropological Institute of Great Britain and Ireland, 9 (1880), pp. 181–232.

On the English Church:

- H.H. Howorth, The History of the Church in England to the Eighth Century (in three volumes, 1912–17):
  - Saint Gregory the Great (1912);
  - Saint Augustine of Canterbury (1913); and
  - The Golden Days of the Early English Church (1917).

In his geological works, he attacked the theories of Charles Lyell, discounting the existence of Ice Ages in favour of great floods:

  - H.H. Howorth, The Mammoth and the Flood (1887);
  - H.H. Howorth, The Glacial Nightmare (1893); and
  - H.H. Howorth, Ice or Water? (1905).

Parliament of the United Kingdom
Preceded by William Mather	Member of Parliament for Salford South; 1886 – 1900	Succeeded by James Grimble Groves
Professional and academic associations
Preceded by George Thomas Orlando Bridgeman	Vice-President of the Record Society of Lancashire and Cheshire; 1892–95	Succeeded by George Edward Cokayne
