= Hilaire Belloc =

French-English author (1870–1953)

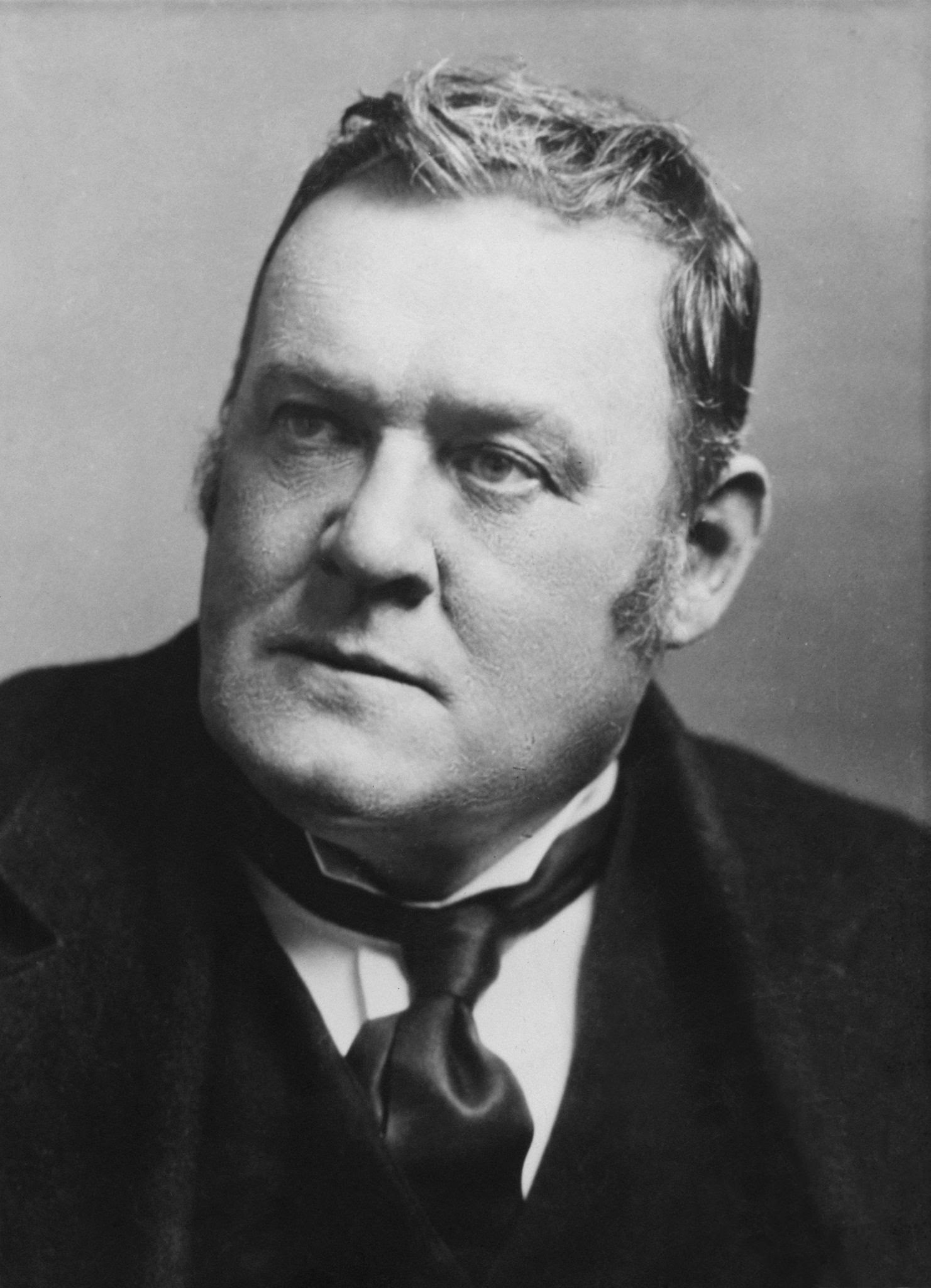
- Belloc, c. 1917
- Born: Joseph Hilaire Pierre René Belloc; 27 July 1870; La Celle-Saint-Cloud, Seine-et-Oise, French Empire
- Died: 16 July 1953 (aged 82); Guildford, Surrey, England
- Resting place: Shrine of Our Lady of Consolation, West Grinstead
- Education: Balliol College, Oxford
- Occupations: Writer; historian; politician
- Spouse: Elodie Hogan (m. 1896; died 1914)
- Children: 5
- Parent: Bessie Rayner Parkes
- Relatives: Marie Belloc Lowndes (sister)

Member of Parliament for Salford South
- In office 1906–1910
- Preceded by: James Grimble Groves
- Succeeded by: Anderson Montague-Barlow

Personal details
- Party: Liberal
- Writing career
- Period: 1896–1953
- Genres: Poetry; history; essays; politics; economics; travel literature
- Movement: Catholic literary revival

Joseph Hilaire Pierre René Belloc (Note: /hɪˈlɛər ˈbɛlək/ hil-AIR BEL-ək, also US: /bəˈlɒk/ bə-LOK; French: [ilɛːʁ bɛlɔk]) (27 July 1870 – 16 July 1953) was a French-English writer and political activist. Belloc was considered one of the most versatile authors of the 20th century, producing essays on history, politics and economics as well as poetry, travelogues and satire. His Catholicism had a strong effect on his works.

Born in France, Belloc became a naturalised British subject in 1902 while retaining his French citizenship. While attending Oxford University, he served as President of the Oxford Union. From 1906 to 1910, he served as one of the few Catholic members of the British Parliament. Belloc was staunchly opposed to both capitalism and communism, and he was one of the founders of distributism, an economic theory advocating widespread local ownership of property.

Belloc was a noted disputant, with a number of feuds. He was also a close friend and collaborator of G. K. Chesterton; George Bernard Shaw, a friend and frequent debate opponent of both Belloc and Chesterton, dubbed the pair "the Chesterbelloc". Belloc's writings encompassed religious poetry and comic verse for children. His widely sold Cautionary Tales for Children included "Jim, who ran away from his nurse, and was eaten by a lion" and "Matilda, who told lies and was burned to death". He wrote historical biographies and numerous travel works, including The Path to Rome (1902).

== Background and early life ==
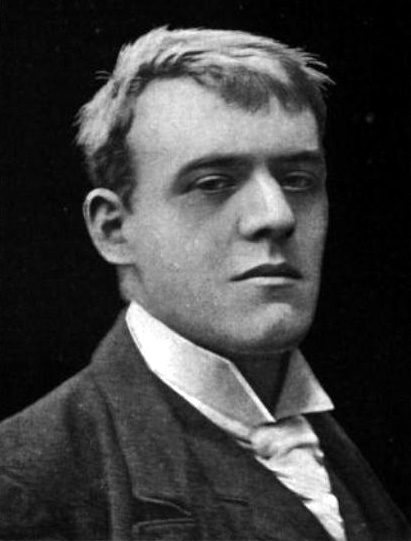
Belloc in 1890, aged twenty

Joseph Hilaire Pierre René Belloc was born on 27 July 1870 in La Celle-Saint-Cloud, France to a French father, Louis Belloc, and an English mother. His sister Marie Adelaide Belloc Lowndes also became a writer.

Belloc's mother Bessie Rayner Parkes was a writer, activist and an advocate for women's equality, a co-founder of the English Woman's Journal and the Langham Place Group. As an adult, Belloc campaigned against women's suffrage as a member of the Women's National Anti-Suffrage League.

Belloc's maternal grandfather was Joseph Parkes. Belloc's grandmother, Elizabeth Rayner Priestley, was born in the United States, a granddaughter of Joseph Priestley. In 1867, Bessie Rayner Parkes married Louis Belloc, an attorney, son of Jean-Hilaire Belloc and Louise Swanton Belloc. In 1872, five years after their marriage, Louis died but not before being ruined in a stock market crash. The young widow then brought her children from France back to England.

Belloc grew up in England; his boyhood was spent in Slindon, West Sussex. He wrote about his home in poems such as "West Sussex Drinking Song", "The South Country", and "Ha'nacker Mill"; after graduating from John Henry Newman's Oratory School in Edgbaston, Birmingham.

== Courtship and marriage ==
In September 1889, Belloc's sister Marie made the accidental acquaintance of a Catholic widow, Mrs. Ellen Hogan, who was travelling from California on a European tour with two of her children, her daughters Elizabeth and Elodie. The travellers were both devoutly Catholic and keenly interested in literature, and Marie arranged a visit with her mother, Bessie, who in turn arranged an audience with Henry Cardinal Manning. These acts of generosity cemented a strong friendship, further deepened when Marie and Bessie accompanied the Hogans on their tour of France, visiting Paris with them. Hilaire was absent touring the French provinces as a correspondent for The Pall Mall Gazette, but when the Hogans stopped back in London on their return from another European trip the following year, Belloc met Elodie for the first time, and was smitten.

Shortly after this meeting, Ellen Hogan was called back to California prematurely to take care of another of her children who was stricken with illness. She left her two daughters, who wished to remain in London, under the care of the Belloc family, and, Bessie asked her son to squire the Hogan daughters around London. Belloc's interest in Elodie grew more fervid by the day. This was the beginning of a long, intercontinental, and star-crossed courtship, made all the more difficult by the opposition of Elodie's mother, who wished Elodie to enter the convent, and Hilaire's mother, who thought her son was too young to marry. Belloc pursued Elodie with letters, and, after her return to the United States, in 1891, he pursued her in person.

The impoverished Belloc, still only twenty years old, sold nearly everything he had to purchase a steamship ticket to New York, ostensibly to visit relatives in Philadelphia. Belloc's true reason for the trek to America became apparent when, after spending a few days in Philadelphia, he began to make his way across the American continent. Part of his journey was by train, but when the money ran out, Belloc just walked. An athletic man who hiked extensively in Britain and Europe, Belloc made his way on foot for a significant part of the 2,870 miles (4,620 km) from Philadelphia to San Francisco. While walking, he paid for lodging at remote farm houses and ranches by sketching the owners and reciting poetry.

Belloc's first letter on his arrival in San Francisco is effervescent, happy to see Elodie and full of hopes for their future, but his manifestly zealous courtship was to go unrewarded. The joy he felt at seeing Elodie soon gave way to disappointment when the apparently insurmountable opposition of her mother to the marriage manifested itself. After a stay of only a few weeks, far shorter than the time he had spent in his journey to California, the crestfallen Belloc made his way back across the United States, after a fruitless journey. His biographer Joseph Pearce compares the return to Napoleon's long winter retreat from Moscow. When Belloc finally reached the East Coast at Montclair, New Jersey, he received a letter from Elodie on 30 April 1891, definitively rejecting him in favour of a religious vocation; the steamship trip home was tainted with despair.

The gloomy Belloc threw himself into restless activity. Determined to fulfil the obligation of military service necessary to retain his French citizenship, Belloc served his term with an artillery regiment near Toul in 1891. While he was serving in France, Elodie's mother Ellen died, removing a significant obstacle to Belloc's hopes, but Elodie, although torn between her affection for Hilaire and her desire to serve God in the religious life, was unwilling to cross her mother's wishes so soon after her mother's untimely death and persisted in refusing Belloc's advances.

After his year of service was concluded, still pining for and writing to Elodie, he took the entrance exam to Oxford University, where he entered Balliol College in January 1893.

In the autumn of 1895, Elodie entered the religious life and joined the Sisters of Charity at Emmitsburg, Maryland, as a postulant. She left a month later, writing to Belloc that she had failed in her religious vocation. In March 1896, having secured financing as an Oxford Extension lecturer in Philadelphia, Germantown, Baltimore and New Orleans, Belloc took a steamship to New York, and started making his way to Elodie in California. He expected to receive letters from her on his journey, but received none. To his shock and dismay, when he finally arrived in California in May, he discovered Elodie was deathly ill, worn out by the stress of the previous year. Belloc, thinking that after all their suffering, he and his beloved would be denied one another by her death, also collapsed. Over the next few weeks, Elodie recovered and after a tumultuous six-year courtship, Belloc and Elodie were married at St. John the Baptist Catholic church in Napa, California, on 15 June 1896. They settled initially in Oxford.

== Oxford career ==
Belloc first came to public attention shortly after arriving at Balliol College, Oxford, in January 1893, a recent French army veteran. Attending his first debate at the Oxford Union debating society, he saw that the affirmative position was wretchedly and half-heartedly defended. As the debate drew to its conclusion, and the division of the house was about to be called, he rose from his seat in the audience and delivered a vigorous, impromptu defence of the proposition. Belloc was deemed to have won that debate, as the division of the house then showed, and his reputation as a debater was established. He was later elected president of the Union for one academic term. He held his own in debates there with F. E. Smith and John Buchan, the latter a friend. John Simon, who was a contemporary at Oxford, later described his "... resonant, deep pitched voice ..." as making an "... unforgettable impression". Gilbert Murray recalled an occasion in 1899 when he "attended a meeting on the principles of Liberalism, at which Hilaire Belloc spoke brilliantly although Murray could not afterwards remember a word that he had said."

Belloc and another undergraduate, Anthony Henley, achieved the record-breaking athletic feat of walking a double marathon distance of 54 miles (87 km) from Carfax Tower in Oxford to Marble Arch in London in 11½ hours.

He was awarded a first-class honours degree in history in June 1895. Belloc later wrote in a poem:

Balliol made me, Balliol fed me,
Whatever I had she gave me again;
And the best of Balliol loved and led me,
God be with you, Balliol men.

== Political life ==
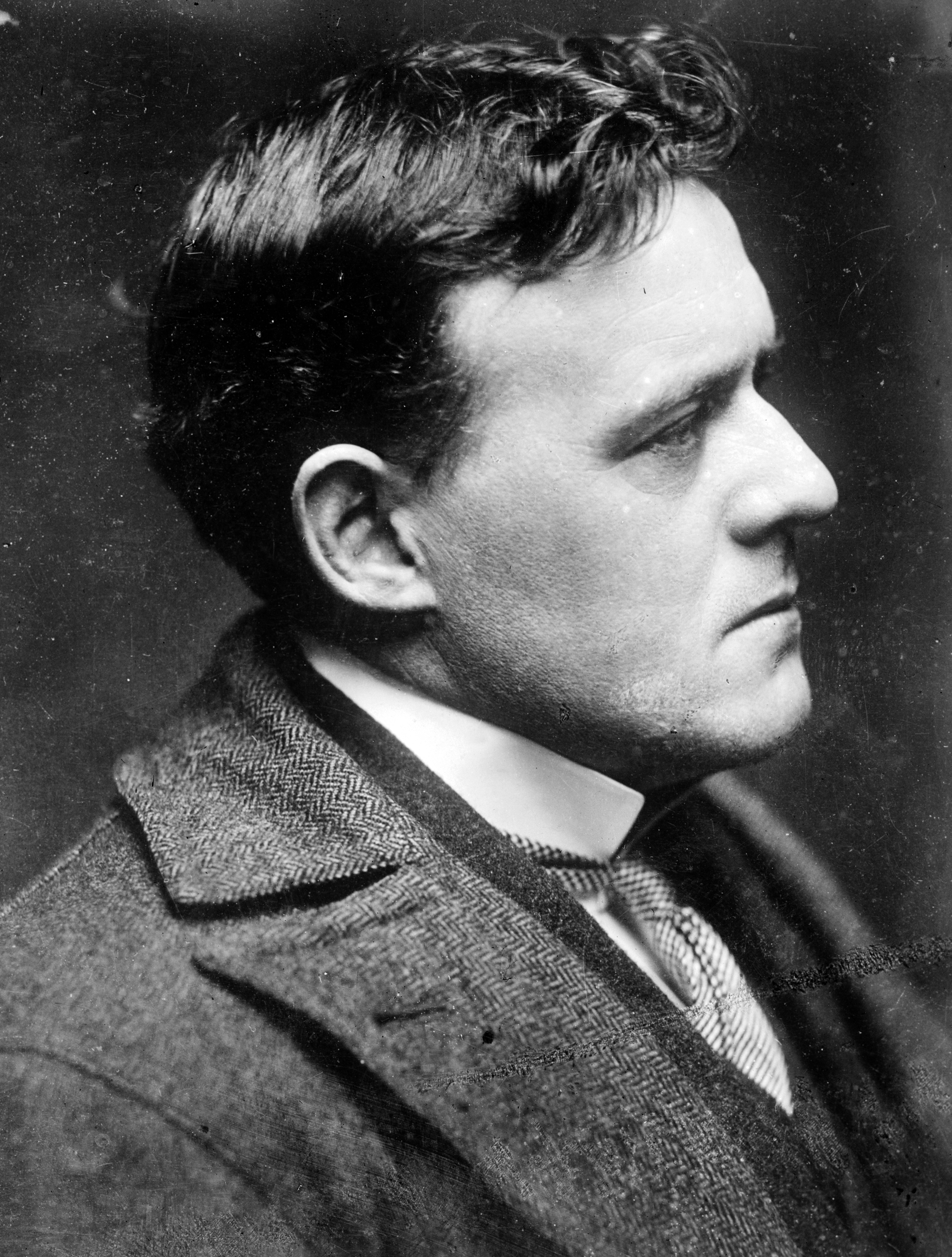
1910 portrait

Belloc went into politics after he became a naturalised British subject. A great disappointment in his life was his failure to gain a fellowship of All Souls College, Oxford in 1895. The failure may have been caused in part by his placing a small statue of the Virgin Mary before him on the table during the interview for the fellowship.

From 1906 to 1910, Belloc was a Liberal Party Member of Parliament for Salford South. During one campaign speech, he was asked by a heckler if he was a "papist". He responded:

Gentlemen, I am a Catholic. As far as possible, I go to Mass every day. This [taking a rosary out of his pocket] is a rosary. As far as possible, I kneel down and tell these beads every day. If you reject me on account of my religion, I shall thank God that He has spared me the indignity of being your representative.

The crowd cheered and Belloc won the election. He retained his seat in the January 1910 election but did not stand in December 1910.

Belloc's only period of steady employment after that was from 1914 to 1920 as editor of Land and Water. Otherwise, he lived by his writing and was often financially insecure.

== Disputes with other authors ==
In the 1920s, Belloc criticised H. G. Wells's Outline of History for its secular bias. Belloc also criticised Wells' belief in evolution by natural selection, which Belloc asserted had been completely discredited. Wells remarked that "Debating Mr. Belloc is like arguing with a hailstorm". Belloc's review of The Outline of History judged the book to be a powerful and well-written volume "up until the appearance of Man, that is, somewhere around page seven". Wells responded with the small book Mr. Belloc Objects. Not to be outdone, Belloc followed with Mr. Belloc Still Objects.

G. G. Coulton wrote Mr. Belloc on Medieval History in a 1920 article. After a long-simmering feud, Belloc replied with a booklet, The Case of Dr. Coulton, in 1938.

Belloc's style during later life fulfilled his childhood nickname, Old Thunder. Belloc's friend Lord Sheffield described his provocative personality in a preface to The Cruise of the Nona. (Note: "Time and again I have seen him throw out a sufficiently outrageous theory in order to stimulate his company, and, be it said, for the pleasure of seeing how slowly he might be dislodged from a position he had purposely taken up knowing it to be untenable ... Of course Belloc was prejudiced, but there were few who knew him who did not love his prejudices, who did not love to hear him fight for them, and who did not honour him for the sincerity and passion with which he held to them. Once the battle was joined all his armoury was marshalled and flung into the fray. Dialectic, Scorn, Quip, Epigram, Sarcasm, Historical Evidence, Massive Argument, and Moral Teaching—of all these weapons he was a past master and each was mobilised and made to play its proper part in the attack. Yet he was a courteous and a chivalrous man. A deeply sensitive man, his was the kindest and most understanding nature I have ever known. In spite of a rollicking and bombastic side he was as incapable of the least cruelty as he was capable of the most delicate sympathy with other people's feelings. As he himself used to say of others in a curiously quiet and simple way, 'He is a good man. He will go to Heaven.'")

== Later years ==
In 1937, Belloc was invited to be a visiting professor at Fordham University in New York City by university president Robert Gannon. Belloc delivered a series of lectures at Fordham which he completed in May of that year. The experience ended up leaving him physically exhausted, and he considered stopping the lectures early.

During his later years, Belloc sailed when he could afford it, and became a well-known yachtsman. He won many races and was on the French sailing team. In the early 1930s, he was given an old pilot cutter named Jersey. He sailed this for some years around the coasts of England with the help of younger men. One sailor, Dermod MacCarthy, wrote a book, Sailing with Mr Belloc.

== Death and legacy ==
In 1942, Belloc suffered a stroke from which he never recovered. On 12 July 1953, he suffered burns and shock after falling on his fireplace. He died on 16 July 1953 at Mount Alvernia Nursing Home in Guildford, Surrey.

Belloc was buried at the Shrine Church of Our Lady of Consolation and St Francis at West Grinstead, where he had regularly attended Mass as a parishioner. His estate was probated at £7,451 (equivalent to £180,732 in 2025). At his funeral Mass, homilist Monsignor Ronald Knox said "No man of his time fought so hard for the good things". Boys from the Choir and Sacristy of Worth Preparatory School sang and served at the Mass.

Recent biographies of Belloc have been written by A. N. Wilson and Joseph Pearce. Jesuit political philosopher James Schall's Remembering Belloc was published by St. Augustine Press in September 2013. A memoir of Belloc was written by Henry Edward George Rope.

== Children and grandchildren ==
In 1906, Belloc bought land and a house called King's Land at Shipley, West Sussex. He had five children with his wife Elodie, before her death at age 45 on the Feast of the Purification, 2 February 1914, probably from cancer. Belloc was 43 and had more than forty years ahead of him, but wore mourning for the rest of his life and kept her room undisturbed as she had left it.

The Bellocs' son Louis was killed in 1918 while serving in the Royal Flying Corps in northern France. Belloc placed a memorial tablet at the nearby Cambrai Cathedral, in a side chapel with the icon of Our Lady of Cambrai. His younger son Peter Gilbert Marie Sebastian Belloc (b. 1904) died at age 36 during the Second World War on 2 April 1941, succumbing to pneumonia during active service in Scotland with the 5th Battalion Royal Marines. He was buried in the churchyard of Our Lady of Consolation and St. Francis, West Grinstead.

Belloc's daughter Eleanor married Reginald Jebb, a schoolmaster, son of George Robert Jebb, a civil engineer. After keeping a prep school at Hawkesyard, Staffordshire, in 1935 they moved away to live with Belloc at King's Land. Their four children were Philip Jebb (1927–1995), an architect; Marianne Jebb (1923–2009), who became a Canoness of St Augustine at the Priory of Our Lady of Good Counsel, taking the name Sister Emmanuel Mary, and was headmistress of its school; Anthony, or Dom Philip Jebb (1932–2014) who was confusingly given the name Brother Philip when he became a novice monk at Downside Abbey in 1950; and Julian Jebb (b. 1934), an actor and BBC producer who died by suicide in October 1984.

Belloc's architect grandson Philip Jebb married Lucy Pollen, a sister of the architect Francis Pollen, and they had two sons and two daughters.

== Writing ==
Belloc wrote more than 150 books on subjects ranging from warfare to poetry to many current topics of his day. He has been called one of the Big Four of Edwardian Letters, along with H. G. Wells, George Bernard Shaw, and G. K. Chesterton, all of whom debated each other into the 1930s. Belloc was closely associated with Chesterton, and Shaw coined the term "Chesterbelloc" for their partnership. Belloc was co-editor with Cecil Chesterton of the literary periodical Eye-Witness.

Asked once why he wrote so much, Belloc responded: "Because my children are howling for pearls and caviar." Belloc observed that "The first job of letters is to get a canon", that is, to identify those works a writer sees as exemplary of the best of prose and verse. For his own prose style, he said he aspired to be as clear and concise as "Mary had a little lamb."

=== Essays and travel writing ===
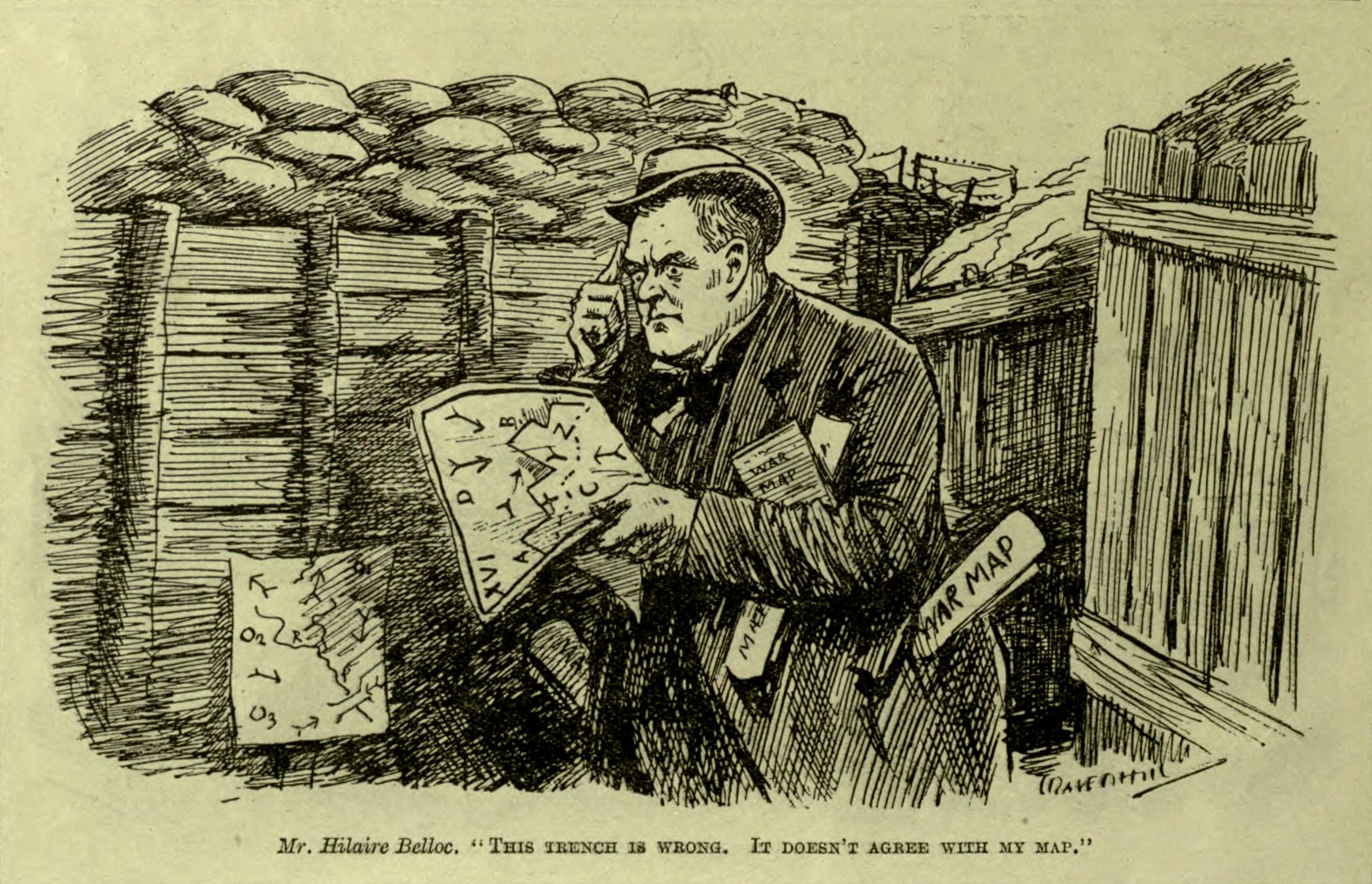
A Punch caricature lampooning Belloc, 27 June 1917

In 1902, Belloc published The Path to Rome, an account of a walking pilgrimage from Central France across the Alps to Rome. The book contains descriptions of the people and places he encountered, his pencil and drawings of the route, humour, poesy. In 1909, Belloc published The Pyrenees, providing many details of that region. He was among the few popular essayists, along with Chesterton, E. V. Lucas and Robert Lynd.

During World War I, Belloc was perceived by soldiers as a "kept correspondent" for the Entente leadership. The Wipers Times mocked him as "Belary Helloc", a satirical persona who advanced foolish suggestions for winning the war.

=== Poetry ===
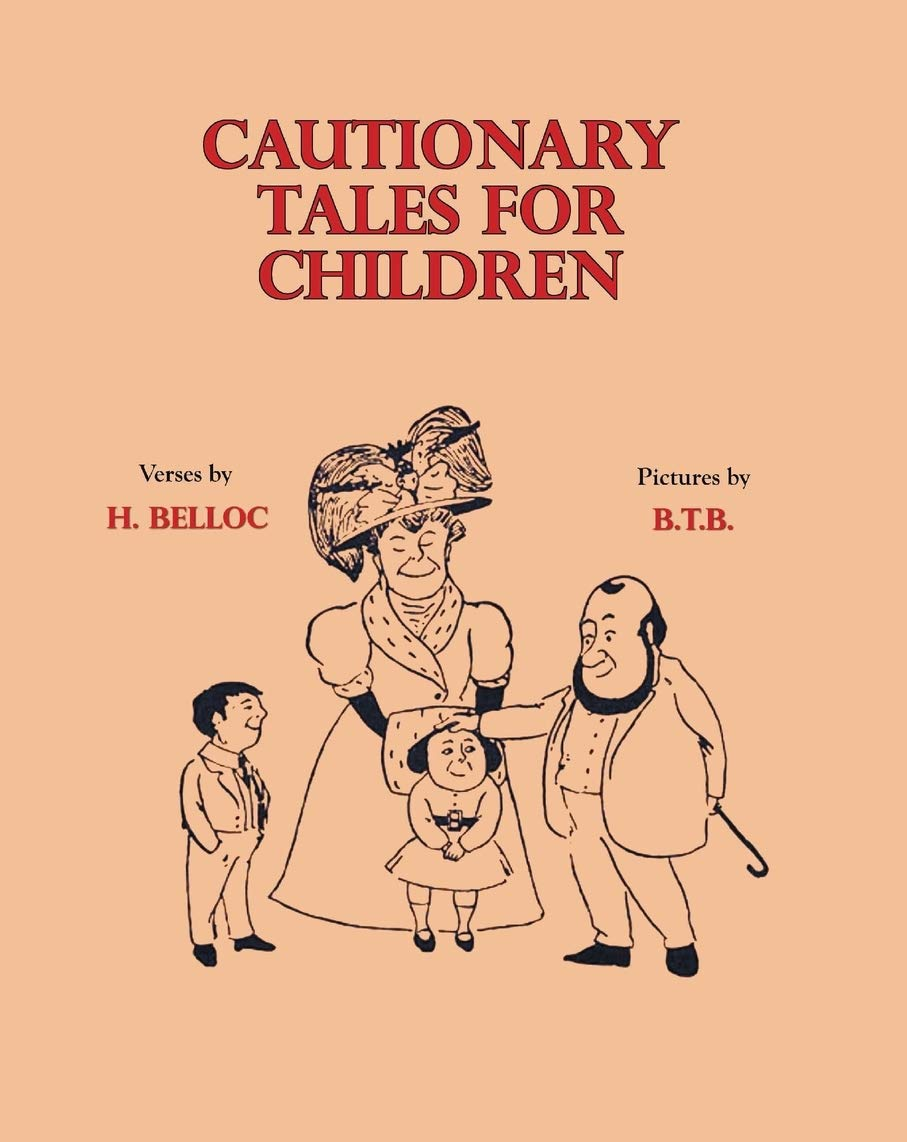
Original cover for Cautionary Tales for Children, illustrated by Basil T. Blackwood

His 1907 Cautionary Tales for Children, humorous poems with implausible morals, illustrated by Basil Temple Blackwood (signing as "B.T.B.") and later by Edward Gorey, are the most widely known of his writings. Supposedly for children, they, like Lewis Carroll's works, are more to adult and satirical tastes: "Henry King, Who chewed bits of string and was early cut off in dreadful agonies". (Note: The Chief Defect of Henry King Was chewing little bits of String. At last he swallowed some which tied Itself in ugly Knots inside. Physicians of the Utmost Fame Were called at once; but when they came They answered, as they took their Fees, "There is no Cure for this Disease. Henry will very soon be dead." His Parents stood about his Bed Lamenting his Untimely Death, When Henry, with his Latest Breath, Cried – "Oh, my Friends, be warned by me, That Breakfast, Dinner, Lunch and Tea Are all the Human Frame Requires ..." With that the Wretched Child expires.) A similar poem tells the story of "Rebecca, who slammed doors for fun and perished miserably".

The tale of "Matilda who told lies and was burned to death" was adapted into the play Matilda Liar! by Debbie Isitt. Quentin Blake, the illustrator, described Belloc as at one and the same time the overbearing adult and mischievous child. Roald Dahl was a follower. But Belloc had a broader, if sourer, scope. For example, with Lord Lundy (who was "far too freely moved to Tears"):

It happened to Lord Lundy then
as happens to so many men
about the age of 26
they shoved him into politics [...]

leading up to

"we had intended you to be
the next Prime Minister but three ...

instead, Lundy is condemned to the ultimate political wilderness:

... The stocks were sold; the Press was squared:
The Middle Class was quite prepared.
But as it is! ...My language fails!
Go out and govern New South Wales!"

The Aged Patriot groaned and died:
And gracious! how Lord Lundy cried!

Of more weight is Belloc's Sonnets and Verse, a volume that deploys the same singing and rhyming techniques of his children's verses. Belloc's poetry is often religious, often romantic; throughout The Path to Rome he writes in spontaneous song.

=== History, politics, and economics ===
1915 portrait of Belloc

Three of his best-known non-fiction works are The Servile State (1912), Europe and the Faith (1920) and The Jews (1922).

He authored the 1924 book Economics for Helen, addressed to a 16-year-old student. Economists criticized the book, with one writing, "he defines wealth as a sum of values rather than valuable things; he fails to distinguish between interest and profit; he says that there is no such thing as interest on money, that the intention of using wealth for further production is the essential feature of capital, and that taxes should fall proportionately to the wealth of the taxed, in order that the sacrifice should be equally felt by all." Another economist wrote, "On the whole this very readable book is interesting as affording some insight into an original mind rather than useful as an introduction to Economics."

From an early age Belloc knew Cardinal Henry Edward Manning, who was responsible for the conversion of his mother to Catholicism. In The Cruise of the "Nona" (1925), he mentions a "profound thing" that Manning said to him when he was just twenty years old: "All human conflict is ultimately theological." What Manning meant, Belloc said, is "that all wars and revolutions, and all decisive struggles between parties of men arise from a difference in moral and transcendental doctrine." Belloc adds that he never met any man, "arguing for what should be among men, but took for granted as he argued that the doctrine he consciously or unconsciously accepted was or should be a similar foundation for all mankind. Hence battle." Manning's involvement in the London Dock Strike of 1889 made a major impression on Belloc and his view of politics, according to biographer Robert Speaight. He became a trenchant critic both of capitalism (Note: "Belloc's argument is that capitalism as a system is breaking down, and that this is to be welcomed. A society in which a minority owns and controls the means of production, while the majority are reduced to proletarian status, is not only wrong but unstable. Belloc sees it breaking down in two ways – on the one hand into State action for welfare (which pure capitalism cannot embody); on the other hand into monopoly and the restraint of trade. There are only two alternatives to this system: socialism, which Belloc calls collectivism; and the redistribution of property on a significant scale, which Belloc calls distributivism.") and of many aspects of socialism.

Together with G. K. Chesterton, Cecil Chesterton, and Arthur Penty, he envisioned the socioeconomic system of distributism, which advocates for a market economy with state regulation favoring cooperatives and small to medium enterprises against the concentrated economic power of large firms, finance-owned trusts, and monopolies. In The Servile State, written after his party-political career, and in other works, he criticised the modern economic order and parliamentary system, advocating distributism in opposition to both capitalism and socialism. Belloc argued that distributism was not an innovation but rather a return to the economics of widely distributed property that prevailed in Europe for the thousand years when it was Catholic. He called for the dissolution of Parliament and its replacement with committees of representatives for the various sectors of society, similar to medieval guilds, an idea that was popular at the time under the name of corporatism.

He contributed an article on "Land-Tenure in the Christian Era" to the Catholic Encyclopedia.

Belloc held republican views, but became increasingly sympathetic to monarchism as he grew older. In his youth, he had initially been loyal to the French idea of republicanism, seeing it as a patriotic duty. Michael Hennessy, Chairman of the Hilaire Belloc Society, wrote that "In some respects, Belloc remained a republican until his death, but increasingly realized that there were not enough republicans to make a republic function effectively. Belloc thus felt that monarchy was the most practicable, superior form of government." Belloc explores some of these ideas in his work Monarchy: A Study of Louis XIV, where he wrote that democracy "is possible only in small states, and even these must enjoy exceptional defences, moral or material, if they are to survive."

Developing these linked themes, he wrote a long series of contentious biographies of historical figures, including Oliver Cromwell, James II, and Napoleon. They show him as an ardent proponent of orthodox Catholicism and a critic of many elements of the modern world.

Outside academe, Belloc was impatient with what he considered tendentious histories, especially what he called "official history." (Note: "There is an enormous book called volume 1 of A Cambridge History of the Middle Ages. It is 759 pages in length of close print ... It does not mention the Mass once. That is as though you were to write a history of the Jewish dispersion without mentioning the synagogue or of the British empire without mentioning the city of London or the Navy" (Letters from Hilaire Belloc, Hollis and Carter, 75).) Joseph Pearce notes also Belloc's critique of the secularism of H. G. Wells's popular Outline of History:

Belloc objected to his adversary's tacitly anti-Christian stance, epitomized by the fact that Wells had devoted more space in his "history" to the Persian campaign against the Greeks than he had given to the figure of Christ.

He wrote also substantial amounts of military history. He also contributed to the 1931 alternative history collection If It Had Happened Otherwise edited by Sir John Squire.

== Religion ==
One of Belloc's more famous statements equated European society with Christendom: "the faith is Europe and Europe is the faith"; this view was expressed in many of his works from 1920 to 1940, which are still cited as exemplary Catholic apologetics. They have also been criticised, for instance by comparison with the work of Christopher Dawson during the same period.

As a young man, Belloc moved away from Catholicism. However, he later stated that a spiritual event, which he never discussed publicly, prompted his return to it. Belloc alludes to this return to Catholicism in a passage in The Cruise of the Nona.

According to his biographer A. N. Wilson (Hilaire Belloc, Hamish Hamilton), Belloc never wholly apostatised from the faith (ibid p. 105). The momentous event is fully described by Belloc in The Path to Rome (pp. 158–61). It took place in the Swiss village of Undervelier at the time of Vespers. Belloc said of it, "not without tears", "I considered the nature of Belief" and "it is a good thing not to have to return to the Faith". (See Hilaire Belloc by Wilson at pp. 105–06.) Belloc believed that the Catholic Church provided hearth and home for the human spirit. More humorously, his tribute to Catholic culture can be understood from his well-known saying, "Wherever the Catholic sun does shine, there's always laughter and good red wine."

Belloc had a disparaging view of the Church of England, and used sharp words to describe heretics, such as, "Heretics all, whoever you may be/ In Tarbes or Nîmes or over the sea/ You never shall have good words from me/ Caritas non-conturbat me". Indeed, in his "Song of the Pelagian Heresy" he described how the Bishop of Auxerre, "with his stout Episcopal staff/ So thoroughly thwacked and banged/ The heretics all, both short and tall/ They rather had been hanged".

Belloc sent his son Louis to Downside School (1911–1915). Louis's biography and death in August 1918 is recorded in "Downside and the War".

=== Islam ===
Belloc's 1937 book The Crusades: the World's Debate, he wrote

The story must not be neglected by any modern, who may think in error that the East has finally fallen before the West, that Islam is now enslaved – to our political and economic power at any rate if not to our philosophy. It is not so. Islam essentially survives, and Islam would not have survived had the Crusade made good its hold upon the essential point of Damascus. Islam survives. Its religion is intact; therefore its material strength may return. Our religion is in peril, and who can be confident in the continued skill, let alone the continued obedience, of those who make and work our machines? ... There is with us a complete chaos in religious doctrine...We worship ourselves, we worship the nation; or we worship (some few of us) a particular economic arrangement believed to be the satisfaction of social justice ... Islam has not suffered this spiritual decline; and in the contrast between [our religious chaos and Islam's] religious certitudes still strong throughout the Mohammedan world lies our peril.

In The Great Heresies (1938), Belloc argued that although "Muslim culture happens to have fallen back in material applications; there is no reason whatever why it should not learn its new lesson and become our equal in all those temporal things which now alone give us our superiority over it—whereas in Faith we have fallen inferior to it."

Belloc continued:

It has always seemed to me possible, and even probable, that there would be a resurrection of Islam and that our sons or our grandsons would see the renewal of that tremendous struggle between the Christian culture and what has been for more than a thousand years its greatest opponent.

There is no reason why its recent inferiority in mechanical construction, whether military or civilian, should continue indefinitely. Even a slight accession of material power would make the further control of Islam by an alien culture difficult. A little more and there will cease that which our time has taken for granted, the physical domination of Islam by the disintegrated Christendom we know.

Belloc considered that Islam was permanently intent on destroying the Christian faith, as well as the West, which Christendom had built. In The Great Heresies, Belloc grouped the Protestant Reformation together with Islam as one of the major heresies threatening the "Universal Church".

=== Jews ===
Belloc's writings were at times supportive of antisemitism and other times condemnatory of it.

Belloc took a leading role in denouncing the Marconi scandal of 1912. Belloc emphasized that key players in both the government and the Marconi corporation had been Jewish. American historian Todd Endelman identifies Catholic writers as central critics. In his opinion:

The most virulent attacks in the Marconi affair were launched by Hilaire Belloc and the brothers Cecil and G. K. Chesterton, whose hostility to Jews was linked to their opposition to liberalism, their backward-looking Catholicism, and the nostalgia for a medieval Catholic Europe that they imagined was ordered, harmonious, and homogeneous. The Jew baiting at the time of the Boer War and the Marconi scandal was linked to a broader protest, mounted in the main by the Radical wing of the Liberal Party, against the growing visibility of successful businessmen in national life and their challenges to what were seen as traditional English values.

A. N. Wilson's biography expresses the belief that Belloc tended to allude to Jews negatively in conversation, sometimes obsessively. Anthony Powell mentions in his review of that biography that in his view Belloc was thoroughly antisemitic, at all but a personal level.

In The Cruise of the Nona, Belloc reflected equivocally on the Dreyfus affair after thirty years. (Note: "I, for my part, pretend to no certain conclusion in the matter ... Of my own intimate acquaintance who were on the spot [at Dreyfus' trial] and competent to judge, most were for the innocence of Dreyfus: but the rest, fully competent also, were and are, convinced of his guilt ... There are in England to-day two Englishmen whose wide knowledge of Europe and especially of Paris, and the French tongue and society, enable them to judge. They are both close friends of mine. One is for, the other against ... I believe that, when the passions have died down, the Dreyfus case will remain for history very much what the Diamond Necklace has remained, or the Tichborne case; that is, there will be a popular legend, intellectually worth nothing; and, for the historian, the task of criticising that legend, but hardly of solving the problem.") Norman Rose's 200 book The Cliveden Set asserts that Belloc "was moved by a deep vein of hysterical anti-semitism":

In his 1922 book, The Jews, Belloc argued that "the continued presence of the Jewish nation intermixed with other nations alien to it presents a permanent problem of the gravest character", and that the "Catholic Church is the conservator of an age-long European tradition, and that tradition will never compromise with the fiction that a Jew can be other than a Jew. Wherever the Catholic Church has power, and in proportion to its power, the Jewish problem will be recognized to the full."

Robert Speaight cited a letter by Belloc in which he condemned Nesta Webster because of her accusations against "the Jews". In February 1924, Belloc wrote to an American Jewish friend regarding an anti-Semitic book by Webster. Webster had rejected Christianity, studied Eastern religions, accepted the supposed Hindu concept of the equality of all religions and was fascinated by theories of reincarnation and ancestral memory. (Note: In my opinion it is a lunatic book. She is one of those people who have got one cause on the brain. It is the good old 'Jewish revolutionary' bogey. But there is a type of unstable mind which cannot rest without morbid imaginings, and the conception of a single cause simplifies thought. With this good woman it is the Jews, with some people it is the Jesuits, with others Freemasons and so on. The world is more complex than that. R. Speaight, The Life Of Hilaire Belloc, 1957, pp. 456–58.) Speaight also points out that when faced with anti-Semitism in practice—as at elitist country clubs in the United States before World War II—he voiced his disapproval. Belloc also condemned Nazi anti-Semitism in The Catholic and the War (1940). (Note: The Third Reich has treated its Jewish subjects with a contempt for Justice which even if there had been no other action of the kind in other departments would be a sufficient warranty for determining its elimination from Europe ... Cruelty to a Jew is as odious as cruelty to any human being, whether that cruelty be moral in the form of insult, or physical ... You may hear men saying on every side, 'However, there is one thing I do agree with and that is the way they (The Nazis) have settled the Jews'. Now that attitude is directly immoral. The more danger there is that it will grow the more necessity there is for denouncing it. The action of the enemy toward the Jewish race has been in morals intolerable. Contracts have been broken on all sides, careers destroyed by the hundred and the thousand, individuals have been treated with the most hideous and disgusting cruelty ... If no price is paid for such excesses, our civilisation will certainly suffer and suffer permanently. If the men who have committed them go unpunished (and only defeat in war can punish them) then the decline of Europe, already advanced, will proceed to catastrophe. (pp. 29ff.))

== Sussex ==
Belloc grew up in Slindon and spent most of his life in the part of Sussex that is now West Sussex. He always wrote of Sussex as if it were the crown of England and the western Sussex Downs the jewel in that crown. He loved Sussex as the place where he was brought up, considering it his earthly "spiritual home".

Belloc wrote several works about Sussex including Ha'nacker Mill, The South Country, the travel guide Sussex (1906) and The County of Sussex (1936). One of his best-known works relating to Sussex is The Four Men: A Farrago (1911), in which the four characters, each aspects of Belloc's personality, travel on a pilgrimage across the county from Robertsbridge to Harting. The work has influenced others including musician Bob Copper, who retraced Belloc's steps in the 1980s.

Belloc was also a lover of Sussex songs and wrote lyrics for some songs which have since been put to music. Belloc is remembered in an annual celebration in Sussex, known as Belloc Night, that takes place on the writer's birthday, 27 July, in the manner of Burns Night in Scotland. The celebration includes reading from Belloc's work and partaking of a bread and cheese supper with pickles.

== In the media ==
- Stephen Fry has recorded an audio collection of Belloc's children's poetry.
- Composers Mary Plumstead and Peter Warlock set Belloc's poems to music.
- Peter Ustinov recorded Belloc's The Cautionary Tales in 1968 for the Musical Heritage Society (MHC 9249M).
- A well-known parody of Belloc by Sir John Squire, intended as a tribute, is Mr. Belloc's Fancy.
- Syd Barrett used Cautionary Tales as the basis for the song "Matilda Mother" from the 1967 album The Piper at the Gates of Dawn.
- King's Mill, Shipley, once owned by Belloc, was used in the British TV drama Jonathan Creek.
- On the second episode of Monty Python's Flying Circus, in the sketch "The Mouse Problem", a list of famous people who secretly were mice is concluded with "and, of course, Hilaire Belloc".

== See also ==
- Hilaire Belloc bibliography
- Mr. Belloc Objects to "The Outline of History" – H. G. Wells's dispute with Belloc

== Bibliography ==
=== Sources ===
- Belloc, Hilaire (1956) [1925, 1928, 1934, 1947, 1955]. The Cruise of the "Nona". Westminster, Maryland: The Newman Press – via Internet Archive (Marygrove College). LCCN 56-9992 (1956 ed.), LCCN 25-14726 (1925 ed.), LCCN 25-10997 (1925 ed.); OCLC 1026300 (all editions).
1. p. xv. "Introduction" – "The Historian".
2. pp. xi–xii. "Introduction" – "The Catholic".
3. p. 55.
4. p. 56.
- Boyd, Ian. "Hilaire Belloc: the Myth and the Man," The Tablet, 12 July 2003.
- Boyle, David. "Hilaire Belloc and the Liberal Revival: Distributism: An Alternative Liberal Tradition?" Archived 21 May 2013 at the Wayback Machine, Journal of Liberal History, Issue 40, Autumn 2003.
- Braybrooke, Patrick. Some Thoughts on Hilaire Belloc, Drane's, 1924.
- Cooney, Anthony. Hilaire Belloc: 1870–1953, Third Way Movement Ltd., 1998.
- Corrin, Jay P. G. K. Chesterton & Hilaire Belloc: The Battle Against Modernity, Ohio University Press, 1991.
- Coyne, Edward J. "Mr. Belloc on Usury," Studies: An Irish Quarterly Review, Vol. 21, No. 82, Jun. 1932.
- Gardner, A. G. "Mr. Hilaire Belloc." In Pillars of Society, James Nisbet, 1913.
- Hamilton, Robert. Hilaire Belloc; An Introduction to his Spirit and Work, Douglas Organ, 1945.
- Haynes, Renée. Hilaire Belloc, British Council and the National Book League, 1953.
- Independent (The). London, England. ISSN 1741-9743.
1. Jebb, Louis (né Louis Bernard Alexander Jebb; born 1956) [at Wikidata] (12 April 1995). "Gazette" – "Obituaries" – "Philip Jebb".
  1. Blog ed..
  2. Print ed. (whole issue no. 2647). p. 16 (columns 1–5) – via Newspapers.com.
  3. Via Gale OneFile: Business (whole issue no. 2647). p. 16 (columns 1–5). Gale FQ4201452046
2. Jebb, Louis [at Wikidata] (1 July 2014) [July 2, 2014]. "Obituaries" – "Dom Philip Jebb: Monk Who Became a Leading Figure in the Benedictine Order and Was a Perceptive Counsellor to Lay People". Retrieved 26 November 2025.
  1. Blog ed.. 1 July 2014.
  2. Print ed. (whole issue no. 8652). 2 July 2014. p. 44 (section 2; columns 1–3) – via Newspapers.com.
  3. Print ed. (whole issue no. 8652). 2 July 2014. p. 44 (section 2; columns 1–3) – via Newspapers.com.
  4. Via Gale OneFile: Business (whole issue no. 8652). 2 July 2014. p. 44 (section 2; columns 1–3). Gale A373400563
Note 1: Dom Philip Jebb (1932–2014) was born Anthony Reginald Austin Jebb. On becoming a novice at the Benedictine Downside Abbey, he was given the monastic name Philip, despite having an elder brother, Philip Vincent Belloc Jebb (1927–1995), the architect.
Note 2: The author, Louis Jebb, is a son of Philip Jebb. Joseph Hilaire Pierre Belloc – by way of his daughter – was a great grandfather of Louis Jebb.
- Irish Monthly (The). Irish Jesuit Province. ISSN 2009-2113; OCLC 9615097 (all editions).
1. MacManus, Francis (1909–1965) (July 1936). "Mr. Belloc's England". Vol. 64, no. 757. pp. 467–471. JSTOR 20513968; OCLC 9980307317.
2. Rope, Henry Edward George (1880–1978) (October 1953). "My Memory of Hilaire Belloc". Vol. 81, no. 962. pp. 379–382. JSTOR 20516628; OCLC 9980180217.
3. Fytton, Francis (né Charles Farid Bassili Francis Fytton; 1928–1977) (March 1954). "After Belloc: Who?". Vol. 83, no. 967. pp. 95–97. JSTOR 20516711; OCLC 9980268914.
4. Fytton, Francis (September 1954). "In Defence of Belloc". Vol. 83, no. 973. pp. 350–352. JSTOR 20516795; OCLC 9980355661.
- Kelly, Hugh.
1. "Hilaire Belloc: Catholic Champion: In Commemoration of His Seventieth Birthday," Studies: An Irish Quarterly Review, Vol. 30, No. 117, Mar. 1941.
2. "Centenary of Hilaire Belloc," Studies: An Irish Quarterly Review, Vol. 59, No. 236, Winter, 1970.
- Kilmer, Joyce. "The Poetry of Hilaire Belloc," Prose Works, Vol. 2, George H. Doran Company, 1918.
- Leo, Brother. "Hilaire Belloc, Initiator," The Catholic World, Vol. CXII, March 1921.
- Longaker, Mark. "Bias and Brilliance: Mr. Hilaire Belloc," Contemporary Biography, University of Pennsylvania Press, 1934.
- Lowndes, Marie Belloc. The Young Hilaire Belloc, Some Records of Youth and Middle Age, P. J. Kennedy & Sons, 1956.
- Mandell, C. Creighton and Shanks, Edward. Hilaire Belloc, the Man and his Work, Methuen & Co., 1916.
- Maynard, Theodore. "The Chesterbelloc," Part II, Part III, Part IV, The Catholic World, Vol. CX, October 1919/March 1920.
- McCarthy, John P.
1. Hilaire Belloc: Edwardian Radical, Liberty Press, 1978.
2. "Hilaire Belloc and the French Revolution," Modern Age, Spring 1993.
- McInerny, Ralph (1929–2010) (30 September 2008). "The Chesterbelloc Thing". The Catholic Thing. Archived from the original on 18 May 2011.
- Morton, J. B. Hilaire Belloc: A Memoir, Hollis & Carter, 1955.
- Pearce, Joseph (2015). Old Thunder: A Life of Hilaire Belloc. 2002 ed. → San Francisco: Ignatius Press. 2015 ed. → Charlotte, North Carolina: TAN Books. p. 45.
- LCCN 2002-105044
- OL 3573199M, OL 9211173M, OL 22510514M;
- ISBN 978-0-8987-0942-1, 0-8987-0942-3 (2002 ed.; hardcover),
- ISBN 978-0-0027-4095-1, 0-0027-4095-8 (2002 ed.; hardcover),
- ISBN 978-0-0027-4096-8, 0-0027-4096-6 (2003 ed.; paperback),
- ISBN 978-1-6189-0656-4, 1-6189-0656-9 (2015 ed.; paperback);
- OCLC 52145861 (all editions)
1. Via Internet Archive (2002 ed.). p. 13.
2. Via Google Books (limited preview) (2002 ed.).
3. Via Google Books (limited preview) (2015 ed.).
- Rich, Tim. "On a Monkey's Birthday: Belloc and Sussex." In Common Ground: Around Britain in Thirty Writers, Cyan Books, 2006 ISBN 1-904879-93-4.
- Schall, James V. "Belloc's Infamous Phrase," The Catholic Thing, 18 October 2011.
- Semper, I. J. A Study of Four Outstanding Books of Christian Apologetics, Columbia College Library, 1928.
- Sherbo, Arthur. "Belated Justice to Hilaire Belloc, Versifier (1870–1953)," Studies in Bibliography, Vol. 45, 1992.
- Shuster, George Nauman (1894–1977) (1922). "The Adventures of a Historian: Hilaire Belloc" [Chapter 14]. In: The Catholic Spirit in Modern English Literature. The Macmillan Company. pp. 249–267 – via Internet Archive (Saint Mary's College of California). LCCN 22-12491; OCLC 661089 (all editions).
- Speaight, Robert. The Life of Hilaire Belloc, Farrar, Straus & Cudahy, 1957.
- Stove, R. J. "Why Belloc Still Matters," The American Conservative, 13 January 2003.
- Wilhelmsen, Frederick.
1. Hilaire Belloc: No Alienated Man. A Study in Christian Integration, Sheed and Ward, 1953.
2. "The World of Hilaire Belloc". Modern Age. Spring 1979. ISSN 0026-7457 (journal).
3. "Hilaire Belloc: Old Thunder". Modern Age. Fall 1984.
4. "Hilaire Belloc: Defender of the Faith," The Catholic Writer: The Proceedings of the Wethersfield Institute, Vol. II, 1989 [Rep. by CERC: Catholic Education Resource Center Archived 6 May 2013 at the Wayback Machine.
- Williams, Raymond (1921–1988) (1963) [1958]. Culture and Society, 1780–1950. New York: 1958 ed.: Columbia University Press. 1963 ed.: Penguin Books. pp. 187–188. LCCN 58-4388; OCLC 2904605 (all editions).
1. Part II: Interregnum – V. "Critics of the State" – via Internet Archive (Queen Mary University of London, withdrawn).
2. See Culture and Society
- Wilson, A. N. Hilaire Belloc, Atheneum, 1984 [Rep. by Gibson Square Books, 2003].
- Woodruff, Douglas, ed., For Hilaire Belloc, Sheed & Ward, 1942 [with contributions by Douglas Jerrold, Ronald Knox, Arnold Lunn, C. A. J. Armstrong, Christopher Hollis, Gervase Matthew, David Mathew, J. B. Morton, W. A. Pantin, David Jones].

Parliament of the United Kingdom
Preceded by James Grimble Groves	Member of Parliament for Salford South; 1906–1910	Succeeded by Anderson Montague-Barlow
