= Frank Allaun =

British politician (1913-2002)

Chair of The Labour Party
- In office 1978–1979
- Leader: James Callaghan
- Preceded by: Joan Lestor
- Succeeded by: Lena Jeger

Member of Parliament for Salford East
- In office 26 May 1955 – 13 May 1983
- Preceded by: Edward Arthur Hardy
- Succeeded by: Stan Orme

Personal details
- Born: 27 February 1913 Manchester, England
- Died: 26 November 2002 (aged 89) Manchester, England

Frank Julian Allaun (27 February 1913 – 26 November 2002) was a British Labour politician.

Born in Manchester, Allaun was educated at Manchester Grammar School and worked as an engineer, shop assistant, tour leader, chartered accountant and journalist. He helped to organise the first Aldermaston March in 1958 and was chair of the Labour Peace Fellowship. Allaun was against British membership of the EEC.

Allaun contested Manchester Moss Side in 1951. He was Member of Parliament for Salford East from 1955 to 1983.

He was a veteran of leftwing causes, especially the Campaign for Nuclear Disarmament (CND), of which he was vice president from 1983. He was the first President of the Campaign for Labour Party Democracy in 1973. Allaun wrote several books on nuclear weapons including Stop the H-Bomb Race (1959) and The Wasted 30 Billions (1975).

In his book Next Stop Execution, Oleg Gordievsky stated that's Allaun's work with the peace movement and elsewhere was viewed favourably within the Soviet Union.

Outside the peace movement, his preoccupation was with public housing, and he argued vastly increased expenditure should be paid for by cuts in defence. Despite Allaun's life work, Britain remained a nuclear power.

Frank Allaun retired from the House of Commons in 1983 but continued to be active in politics. This included writing the books Spreading the News: A Guide To Media Reform (1989) and The Struggle for Peace (1992).

His recreations were walking and swimming.

His first wife died in 1986, and on 3 June 1989 he married Millie Bobker, née Greenberg, a widow and retired civil servant.

He died in Manchester in 2002 aged 89. His second wife, son and daughter survived him.

== Notes ==
Parliament of the United Kingdom
Preceded by Edward Arthur Hardy	Member of Parliament for Salford East; 1955–1983	Succeeded by Stan Orme
Political offices
Preceded by Joan Lestor	Chair of The Labour Party; 1978–1979	Succeeded by Lena Jeger
