= Rupert Howorth =

Sir Rupert Beswicke Howorth KCMG KCVO CB JP
- Born: 1880; London, UK
- Died: 1964; London, UK
- Occupations: Barrister; Civil servant
- Relatives: Sir Henry Hoyle Howorth (father)

Sir Rupert Beswicke Howorth KCMG KCVO CB JP (13 July 1880 – 3 January 1964) was a British barrister and senior civil servant.

Howorth was the son of the politician, barrister and historian Sir Henry Hoyle Howorth and Katherine Brierley. Rupert was educated at St Paul's School, London and New College, Oxford where he took a second in Modern History in 1902. He was called to the Bar at Inner Temple in 1903.

He entered the Board of Education in 1908 and transferred to HM Treasury in 1915. In 1919 he was seconded to the Cabinet Office, and he served as the Secretary at the Imperial Conferences of 1923, 1926, 1930 and 1937. He was appointed a Companion of the Order of the Bath (CB) in the 1926 Birthday Honours. In 1930 he became Deputy Secretary to the Cabinet, holding the position until 1942. He was made Knight Commander of the Order of St Michael and St George in 1933. Between 1938 and 1942 he was Clerk of the Privy Council. Howorth was made Knight Commander of the Royal Victorian Order in the 1942 Birthday Honours. He was Secretary of the Commissions of the Peace between 1945 and 1946.

Government offices
Preceded by Sir Maurice Hankey	Clerk of the Privy Council; 1938–1942	Succeeded by Sir Eric Leadbitter
