= Mr. Belloc Objects to "The Outline of History" =

1926 book by H. G. Wells

- First Edition Cover
- Author: H. G. Wells
- Language: English
- Genre: Fiction
- Publisher: Methuen & Co. Ltd.
- Publication date: 1926
- Publication place: United Kingdom
- Media type: Print (Paperback)
- Pages: 55

Mr. Belloc Objects to "The Outline of History" is a 1926 short book written by the British novelist H. G. Wells as a rebuttal of the criticism of historian Hilaire Belloc. In 1926, Belloc published his A Companion to Mr. Wells's "Outline of History" as a critique of Wells's earlier historical textbook, The Outline of History. A devout Roman Catholic, Belloc was deeply offended by Wells' treatment of Christianity in The Outline.

== Conflict ==
Wells published his Outline in 1920 as a universal history – one that deals with more than "reigns and pedigrees and campaigns". Wells had embarked upon his Outline as a result of his work with the League of Nations and a desire to aid world peace by providing the world "common historical ideas". The Outline proved to be an expansive, all-encompassing work. Wells had a panel of specialists at his disposal to review and check his work. Although the panel revealed many inevitable "gaps, misjudgments and misproportions", Wells reserved the right to "maintain his own judgments". As a result, Hilaire Belloc alleged that The Outline contained a number of biased statements, intolerant statements and false assumptions. Materialistic determinism was viewed as a central philosophy underlying The Outline, with Wells portraying human progress to be both a blind and inevitable rise from the darkness of religious superstition to the light of scientific utopia.

Belloc was the most lively and argumentative of Wells's critics to take aim at The Outline. A devout Catholic and staunch defender of the faith, Belloc attacked Wells's portrayal of religion in general and the Catholic Church in particular. He accused Wells of prejudiced provincialism and attacked his tacitly anti-Christian stance, stating that he had devoted more space to the Persian campaign against the Greeks than he had to the figure of Christ. Belloc's anger led him to take personal shots at Wells, accusing the writer of having "the very grievous fault of being ignorant that he is ignorant". He accused Wells of having the "strange cocksuredness of the man who knows only the old conventional textbook of his schooldays and mistakes it for universal knowledge".

Belloc wrote a series of twenty-four articles attacking The Outline, publishing them in Catholic magazines such as Universe, Southern Cross and Catholic Bulletin. In 1926, Belloc assembled the voluminous articles into a single volume entitled A Companion to Mr. Wells's "Outline of History".

Wells responded to Belloc's articles with a series of six of his own, and found little interest in the academic dispute outside the Catholic publications. As an incentive, he offered the Catholic magazines the use of the articles for no payment; they declined. Wells responded to the refusal in a letter to the Universe:

I am sorry to receive your letter of 19 May. May I point out to you that Mr. Belloc has been attacking my reputation as a thinker, writer, an impartial historian and an educated person for four and twenty fortnights in the Universe? He has misquoted; he has misstated. Will your Catholic public tolerate no reply?

A month later, the editor of the Universe offered Wells the opportunity of correcting definite points of fact upon which he might have been misrepresented. The editor added the stipulation that Wells would not be allowed to defend his views or examine Belloc's logic. Wells then turned to secular publications, and found no interest. He then edited his articles and assembled them into a single volume, his Mr. Belloc Objects to "The Outline of History".

Like Belloc, Wells resorted to personal attacks, accusing Belloc of being "the sort of man who talks loud and fast for fear of hearing the other side", and declaring that "his apparent arrogance is largely the protection of a fundamentally fearful man."

Belloc retaliated with Mr. Belloc Still Objects.
