= Eric Leadbitter =

Sir Eric Cyril Egerton Leadbitter KCVO Kt. (/ˈlɛdˌbɪtər/; 8 June 1891 – 25 February 1971) was a British civil servant and novelist.

In 1937, Leadbitter was made Commander of the Royal Victorian Order. In 1942 he became Clerk of the Privy Council, holding the position until 1951. He was made Knight Commander of the Royal Victorian Order in the 1951 Birthday Honours, having been made knight bachelor in 1946.

He married Irene Lloyd in 1918.

== Books ==
- The Road to Nowhere (1916)
- Perpetual Fires (1918)
- Rain Before Seven (1920)
- Shepherd's Warning (1921)
- Dead Reckoning (1922)
- The Evil that Men Do (1923)

Government offices
| Preceded by Sir Rupert Howorth | Clerk of the Privy Council; 1942–1951 | Succeeded by Major Francis Ford Fernau |
