= James Grimble Groves =

British politician

James Grimble Groves (24 October 1854 – 23 June 1914) was a British brewer and Conservative politician.

== Life ==
He was the son of William Peer Groves, of Springbank, Pendleton, near Salford and was educated privately and at Owen's College, Manchester. He became chairman and managing director of Groves and Whitnall Limited, owners of the Regent Road Brewery, Salford.

Groves was the chairman of the Salford Conservative Association, and when the Member of Parliament for Salford South announced his retirement prior to the 1900 general election, he was selected as the party's candidate. He held the seat for the Conservatives.

In November 1900 a number of arsenic poisonings in the Manchester area were traced to beer from the Groves and Whitnall Brewery, and consequently a large amount of the company's stock had to be destroyed. In 1903, he was appointed a deputy lieutenant of Cheshire.

Groves only served one term in the Commons, losing his seat to Hilaire Belloc in the Liberal landslide at the 1906 general election.

He married in 1878, and made his home at Oldfield Hall, Altrincham, Cheshire. He died in June 1914 aged 59, after a long illness. His daughter, Eileen Norah, married Howard Cumming and their daughter was the writer Anne Cumming. One of Groves' son was Robert Marsland Groves, the naval aviation pioneer and senior Royal Air Force commander. Two other sons William Peer Groves and Keith Grimble Groves went on to join the brewery's board.

== Notes and references ==
Parliament of the United Kingdom
| Preceded by Henry Hoyle Howorth | Member of Parliament for Salford South; 1900–1906 | Succeeded by Hilaire Belloc |
