= John Stourton (politician) =

The Honourable John Joseph Stourton (5 March 1899 – 2 February 1992) was a British politician. He served as the Conservative Member of Parliament (MP) for Salford South from 1931 to 1945.

Stourton was born in 1899, the second son of Charles Stourton, 24th Baron Mowbray. He was first elected to Parliament in the 1931 general election. Over the next few years, he made several speeches attacking Jewish immigration and praising the achievements of Adolf Hitler in Nazi Germany. Stourton became a member of the pro-Nazi Right Club in 1939, and retired at the 1945 general election.

He married Kathleen Alice (died 1986), daughter of Robert Louis George Gunther, of 8, Prince's Gardens, S.W., and Parkwood, Englefield Green, Surrey, in 1923; they divorced in 1933, having had two sons and two daughters:

- Mary (24 Sep 1925 – 30 Dec 2018) married Anthony Gerard Edward Noel, 5th Earl of Gainsborough, and had eight children, including the 6th Earl of Gainsborough.
- Maj. Michael Godwin Plantagenet (7 Dec 1926 – 23 Aug 2001) married Lady Joanna Lambart, daughter of Field Marshal Frederick Lambart, 10th Earl of Cavan and Lady Hester Byng. They had to sons, and two daughters.
- Monica Kathleen (18 Jan 1928, d. 8 Dec 2019) married Sir Henry Louis Carron Greig, son of G/Capt. Sir Louis Greig. They had three sons, and a daughter.
- John Ralph (25 Mar 1930 – 5 Jan 2017) married firstly Virginia Hordern, and together had one daughter. He later married Caroline Honor O'Dwyer, and together they had two daughters.

Stourton married secondly Gladys Leila (died 1953), daughter of Sir William James Waldron, in 1934, and divorced in 1947. John Stourton died in 1992 in Eastbourne, Sussex aged 92.

Having been a lieutenant in the 10th Royal Hussars, Stourton subsequently attained the rank of Major in the Royal Norfolk Regiment, and was awarded the Territorial Decoration. He lived at Miniature Hall, Wadhurst, Sussex.

Parliament of the United Kingdom
Preceded by Joseph Toole	Member of Parliament for Salford South; 1931 – 1945	Succeeded by Edward Hardy
