= Anderson Montague-Barlow =

English politician (1868–1951)

Sir Anderson Montague-Barlow Bt KBE
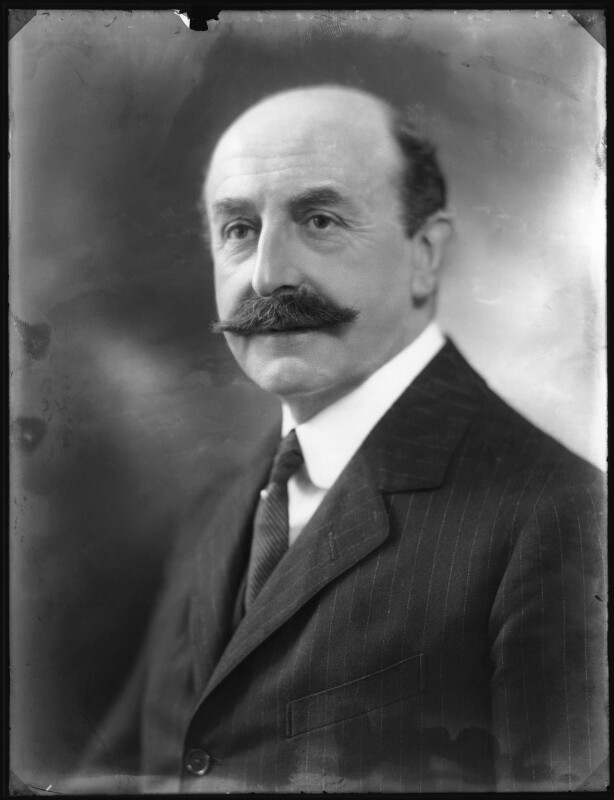
- Montague-Barlow in 1922

Member of Parliament for Salford South
- In office 1910–1923
- Preceded by: Hilaire Belloc
- Succeeded by: Joseph Toole

Minister of Labour of the United Kingdom
- In office 1922–1924
- Preceded by: Thomas Macnamara
- Succeeded by: Tom Shaw

Baronet of Westminster
- In office 1924–1951
- Preceded by: New position
- Succeeded by: Position dissolved

Personal details
- Born: 28 February 1868 St Bartholomew's Vicarage, Clifton, Gloucestershire, England
- Died: 31 May 1951 (aged 83)

Sir Clement Anderson Montague-Barlow, 1st Baronet KBE (28 February 1868 – 31 May 1951) was an English barrister and Conservative Party politician.

== Life ==
Montague-Barlow was born Clement Anderson Barlow at St Bartholomew's Vicarage, Clifton, Gloucestershire, and preferred to be known under his second name, Anderson, rather than his first, Clement. He received a Master's degree and an LL.D. from the University of Cambridge and practised at the bar. Between 1910 and 1923 he represented Salford South in the House of Commons. In 1922 he was admitted to the Privy Council upon becoming Minister of Labour, a position he served in until 1924. He was made a Knight Commander of the Most Excellent Order of the British Empire in 1918 and in 1924 he was created a baronet, of Westminster in the County of London.

In 1937, Neville Chamberlain's government asked Barlow to chair a royal commission into the urban concentration of population and industry, "The Royal Commission on the Distribution of the Industrial Population", which became known as the Barlow Commission. Its report, published in 1940, raised the problem of large towns as a public issue for the first time, and concluded that "planned decentralisation" was favourable. The report was largely ignored at the time, as it came shortly after the outbreak of the Second World War, but its conclusions were a major factor behind the new towns movement after the war, which led to the creation of 27 new towns.

In 1946 Barlow changed his last name to Montague-Barlow.

Montague-Barlow died in May 1951, aged 83, when the baronetcy became extinct.

== See also ==
- Patrick Abercrombie

Parliament of the United Kingdom
Preceded by Hilaire Belloc	Member of Parliament for Salford South; December 1910–1923	Succeeded by Joseph Toole
Political offices
Preceded by Thomas McNamara	Minister of Labour; 1922–1924	Succeeded by Tom Shaw
Baronetage of the United Kingdom
New creation	Baronet (of Westminster); 1924–1951	Extinct
