= William Knight Hall =

British socialist and anarchist activist

William Knight Hall (born 1855) was a British socialist and anarchist activist.

== Biography ==
Born in Buckinghamshire, Hall worked from the age of nine, initially plaiting straw, then as a farm labourer. He also spent time as a navvy, canal boat man, and a tram guard. During a period working in a foundry in Glasgow, he studied at night, learning French and Latin. He read works by Louis Blanc, which led him socialism, and in 1885 he joined the Social Democratic Federation (SDF).

Hall left Glasgow to work as a miner in North Staffordshire, and he then relocated to a pit in Pendleton. He stood for the SDF in the Salford School Board election of 1891, but was not elected. He then stood in Salford South at the 1892 UK general election, Robert Cunninghame-Graham chairing a meeting on his behalf, at which he stresses that Hall was a worker, not a paid activist. Hall came bottom of the poll with 553 votes, which was widely considered to have cost the Liberal Party candidate the seat.

Disappointed by his performance, Hall became a founder of the Manchester Independent Labour Party, but then became interested in anarchism. He moved to Glasgow, then spent time in Edinburgh, where he wrote The Farce of the Ballot Box. He died in the first decade of the 20th century.
