= Joseph Toole (British politician) =

British politician (1887–1945)

Joseph Toole (1887 – 4 June 1945) was a British Labour politician.

Toole was born in 1887, and was the eldest of thirteen children. He began working at the age of 12 as a street scavenger in Manchester by day and as a newspaper vendor by night. He subsequently had various jobs, before establishing his own stationery business. He joined the Labour, and was elected to Manchester City Council in 1919.

In 1923 he was elected as Labour Member of Parliament for Salford South, unseating the sitting Conservative MP. In the following year another election was held, with the Conservatives regaining the seat. At the following election in 1929 Toole was able to regain Salford South for Labour. He was MP for two years before a swing against Labour at the 1931 general election cost him his seat. He stood again, without success, in 1935.

Toole returned to local government as an alderman for the Openshaw ward of Manchester City Council. He was Lord Mayor of the city in 1936/37.

In January 1944 Toole stood as an independent anti-government candidate at a parliamentary by-election in Skipton. Although he only garnered 3,029 votes and lost his deposit, his intervention was enough to enable Hugh Lawson of the Common Wealth Party to defeat the coalition candidate by 221 votes. Toole was promptly expelled from the Labour for breaking the war-time electoral truce between the main political parties.

By the time of his death in June 1945, Toole had moved to Blackpool, where he operated a private hotel. He continued to be a member of Manchester City Council until his death.

Parliament of the United Kingdom
| Preceded by Sir Anderson Montague-Barlow | Member of Parliament for Salford South; 1923 – 1924 | Succeeded by Edmund Ashworth Radford |
| Preceded by Edmund Ashworth Radford | Member of Parliament for Salford South; 1929 – 1931 | Succeeded by John Joseph Stourton |
