= New towns movement =

Urban planning campaign

While purpose-built towns and cities have many precedents in antiquity, beginning with the 195 BC iteration of Chang'an, the New Towns movement refers to an ideologically-driven social campaign. The best-known and possibly most influential of these was a government-driven building and development program which took place in two tranches in the United Kingdom after World War II. Towns were planned and built with two main intentions: to remedy overcrowding and congestion, and to organize scattered ad hoc settlements. An additional purpose was to rehouse people in freshly built, fully planned towns that were completely self-sufficient for the community. Ideological aspects of environmental determinism predominated in this last purpose.

== Aspirations for change ==
In 1817 model communities were proposed by social reformer Robert Owen to address overcrowded towns. Inspired by John Bellers's 1695 proposal for a College of Industry, a colony for the poor enabling disadvantaged people to work and their children to be educated, Owen proposed small, self-contained communities of about twelve hundred people reliant on agriculture but with some other industry. However, his plans "foundered under the heavy weight of revolutionary ideas" Further model community ideas continued to arise but were each dismissed owing to the perception that they were unconvincing as business ventures.

== The "urban disease" ==
In the first decades of the 20th century, urban planning pioneers such as Patrick Geddes facilitated discussion of the relationship between social issues and town planning.

Frederic Osborn referred to urban problems collectively as the "urban disease". The urban disease, a consequence of the industrial revolution, emerged from a cycle where industries settled near population centers, attracting rural migrants seeking employment, leading to further industrialization. This resulted in increased pollution, population density, and declining rural areas. The lack of regulations allowed prosperous families to move to open spaces, while urban centers and rural areas deteriorated. Even those who relocated to new fringe suburbs to escape congestion unintentionally contributed to the process they sought to avoid.

== Garden Cities and New Towns ==
The New Town movement was influenced by Ebenezer Howard, creator of the Garden City Movement. The Garden City idea drew from Anglo-American progressivism and socialism. In 1903, Howard's writings led to the creation of Letchworth Garden City, demonstrating that new towns could be economically viable. This was affirmed by Bernard Shaw, co-founder of the London School of Economics, who referred to his investments in the Garden City Movement as "entirely satisfactory, both economically and morally."

The New Town Movement was derived from the Garden City Movement, based on Howard's writings, and seen as an alternative to the overcrowded, polluted, chaotic and miserable industrial cities that had appeared in Britain. Towards the end of World War I, a group called the "New Townsmen" was formed, including Howard, Osborn, C.B. Purdom and W.G. Taylor. They began advocating for the development of 100 new cities.

== F. J. Osborn ==
Frederic J. Osborn was a champion of the New Towns movement alongside Howard. Osborn was born in 1885 and spent the majority of his life advocating in support of New Towns. Like Howard, he had quite a modest education, having never attended a university. In his early 30s, after meeting Howard through his job at the Howard Cottage Society, he took to the campaign for New Towns. The initial campaigns for the establishment of New Towns failed. Although housing was built, it was often in the form of a "garden suburb", or located on the edge of the existing cities – the antithesis of the Garden City idea. With an increasing lack of faith in the government to take up the flag for public housing and new towns, Howard suggested to Osborn that he was wasting his time lobbying government, and that he would be "as old as Methuselah" waiting for action.

== Beginnings of reform ==
In 1909 a greater understanding of the "urban disease" saw Britain's first town planning legislation created. Although technically opposed to fringe development, the Housing, Town Planning, &c. Act 1909 did not prevent it. Instead, in light of recent success with the development of Hampstead Garden Suburb, the Act, realising that suburbs were easier to develop than towns, held the ethos that good suburbs were better than bad ones. Many planners of the day may have wanted new towns, but were busy dealing with the demand for suburbs: "it is difficult for a technician to earn a living in an ivory tower" Moreover, new towns required government direction, which was beyond the scope of municipal powers alone.

Towards the end of World War I, the Garden City principles were reasserted by the "New Townsmen" (Howard, Osborn, Purdon, and Tayler), who, referring to the success of Letchworth, proposed 100 government-supported new towns to address post-war rebuilding. However, the need for post-war housing resulted in new suburbs being prioritised over towns for the next two decades, with some four million high standard houses built in between the wars. Conversely, some attempts were made at designing rebuilding efforts as satellite towns such as Manchester's Wythenshawe and Liverpool's Speke and Knowsley, which also included provisions for industry. Nonetheless, these were extensions of existing cities and not true New Towns. Furthermore, three-quarters of all the new housing was built privately meaning a default bottom-line approach was adopted into the inter-war development efforts.

During the inter-war years, the government created committees to study the problem of urban concentration. For example, the Committee on Unhealthy Areas (1919-1921), chaired by Neville Chamberlain, recommended the restriction of further industry in London and the relocation of some of the city's existing industry to garden cities. These studies became the origin of Chamberlain's urban decentralisation interests which led to his setting up of the Barlow Commission when he became prime minister. Further important advances included a 1935 Departmental Committee recommendation for the building of new towns in line with garden city principles, and a 1936 Special Areas Report reiterating the idea that no new industry should be allowed in London which gained public and political interest.

== Barlow Royal Commission ==
In 1938, Chamberlain, as the new prime minister, assigned a Royal Commission chaired by Sir Anderson Barlow to study the urban concentration of population and industry. The resulting report raised the problem of large towns as a public issue for the first time and concluded that "planned decentralisation" was favourable for national interests. Due to the war outbreak in 1939, the 1940 publication of the Barlow Report was sidelined. However, it eventually became a turning point for New Towns policy.

The damage brought on by the Second World War provoked significant public interest in what post-war Britain would be like. This was encouraged by the government, who facilitated talk about a "Better Britain" to boost morale. The Barlow Report was quickly turned to as a best practice document.

In 1942, following the report's recommendation, the Government chose to create a central planning authority in the form of the Ministry of Works and Planning, which was commissioned to draft ideas on how to achieve Better Britain from an urban planning perspective. The British government also announced that the report's decentralisation and relocation of population and industry initiatives would be followed.

== Plans and legislation ==
Post-war rebuilding initiatives saw new plans drafted for London, which for the first time addressed the issue of decentralisation. Firstly, the County of London Plan of 1943 recognised that displacement of population and employment was necessary if the city was to be rebuilt at a desirable density. Moreover, the Greater London Plan of 1944 went further by suggesting that over one million people would need to be displaced into a mixture of satellite suburbs, existing rural towns, and new towns.

In 1945, the New Towns Committee was formed to consider the "establishment, development, organisation, and administration" of new towns. Within eight months of its formation, the committee had completed a highly comprehensive study into these issues, resulting in positive recommendations for the construction of new towns. Accordingly, the New Towns Act 1946 (9 & 10 Geo. 6. c. 68) was passed which, coupled with the Town and Country Planning Act 1947, created a "machinery for positive town construction". These Acts resulted in a total of 28 New Towns being constructed in Britain over the following half-century.

== New Towns in Britain ==
It was in 1946 that the work of the "New Townsmen" finally paid off with the passing of the New Towns Act 1946 (9 & 10 Geo. 6. c. 68). Swayed by the need for post-war reconstruction, more housing, and a call to halt any further expansion of London's girth, authorities saw that there was no alternative to the New Town solution. In total, 27 New Towns were built after 1946. These were: Stevenage, Crawley, Hemel Hempstead, Harlow, Hatfield, Basildon, Bracknell, and Milton Keynes outside London; Newton Aycliffe, Peterlee, and Washington in the North East; Skelmersdale and Runcorn in the North West; Corby, Telford, and Redditch in the Midlands; Cwmbran and Newtown in Wales; and in Scotland, East Kilbride, Glenrothes, Cumbernauld, Livingston, and Irvine. Towns that were expanded under the New Towns Act include Peterborough, Northampton, Warrington, Ipswich, and Preston-Leyland-Chorley.

The New Towns Act 1946 (9 & 10 Geo. 6. c. 68) enabled the creation of New Town Development Corporations, whose responsibilities included the management, design and development of New Towns. Stevenage was the first New Town to be designated in 1946. The Stevenage Development Corporation Board existed between 1946 and 1980, when it was dissolved and its planning powers were passed to Stevenage Borough Council. Evelyn Denington, Baroness of Stevenage was the longest-serving chairwoman of the Stevenage Development Corporation, serving between 1966 and 1980, having also been a board member of the Corporation since 1950.

== The New Towns movement in Europe, Asia and the Middle East ==
There were similar problems for New Towns advocates in other areas of the world. In Hong Kong, the new towns were developed as an initiative from the British colonial government. In other areas, although they understood the concept and approved in large numbers, planners had trouble convincing their own governments or agencies of the merits of the proposal.

More than 800 New Towns were founded after the 1917 Revolution in the USSR, but their growth was not constrained by specific limits. For this reason it could be argued that these towns did not meet the criteria for New Towns since planned population and size limitations were an important part of the New Town idea. Other European countries such as France, Germany, Italy and Sweden also had some successes with new towns, especially as part of post-war reconstruction efforts.

The discovery and mass export of oil in the Arabian peninsula region coincided with the New Towns movement in Britain, and this newfound wealth kicked off an unprecedented building boom. Several of the British New Town planners went on to plan new cities in the Arabian peninsula region, particularly Kuwait and Qatar.

== New Towns in Australia ==
Australia was an innovator in the creation of new cities with the commencement of its purpose-designed capital city, Canberra, in 1913. The city's designers, Walter Burley and Marion Mahony Griffin were also employed to design new settlements inland in the New South Wales Riverina district, Griffith and Leeton. Yallourn, a company town designed by Alan La Gerche and built by the State Electricity Commission of Victoria in 1921 evoked design elements from contemporary new towns.

=== Industrial new towns ===
In the years following the Second World War, the Chifley government consolidated a policy to develop a stronger manufacturing base and an immigration program to provide workers. Australian state governments considered ways to attract, and accommodate, workers in proximity to industry.

The South Australian Playford government began planning what was to become the town of Elizabeth, 31 km from central Adelaide, in 1950. It was largely designed by Henry Smith who, Mark Peel writes, 'based his designs on new-town plans and on the American 'Radburn' system of neighbourhood design.' Kwinana, in Western Australia was built contemporaneously with Elizabeth to accommodate workers close to a new oil refinery, and was similarly composed of neighbourhood units. The first of these to be built, Medina was designed by Margaret Feilman.

=== The Department of Urban and Regional Development (DURD) ===
Australia had long had a decentralisation movement and this, amplified by fears amongst social scientists and politicians for the stability and resilience of extant cities, saw campaigns in the more populous Australian states for new city areas to be established. Gough Whitlam made decentralisation a key element of his election campaigns in 1969 and 1972; when the latter was successful, he instituted the Department of Urban and Regional Development, an innovative involvement of Federal government in urban affairs. The Department assisted in the development of state programs such as plans for the combination of the cities of Bathurst and Orange along with the smaller town of Blayney and a new, undeveloped region, Vittoria, to form Bathurst-Orange. It also funded a second South Australian decentralisation project, at Monarto. Its best-known enterprise in the field of decentralisation or 'growth centre' development was Albury-Wodonga, the only one such enterprise to achieve lasting impact. With the demise of the Whitlam government in 1975, the Department of Urban and Regional Development was dismantled.

=== Since the 1970s ===
Subsequent developments superficially in the 'new town' vein, such as the Hamer government's expansion programs for Sunbury and Melton in Victoria are closer to satellite cities in form and concept. In 1988, the ill-fated planned community concept of the Multifunction Polis caused controversy; the final outcome of the 'MFP', the Adelaide suburb of Mawson Lakes is far removed from the original idea.

In the 21st century the private development of Springfield, Queensland is the closest Australia comes to a growing, popular 'new town'.

== New Towns in the United States ==
In the United States, it was not until the 1960s that New Towns policies were put in place, although after World War II grants had been extended for such things as slum clearance, improved and increased housing, and road and highway construction, and in the 1950s, for "comprehensive renewal projects". In addition, the post-war American housing market emphasized the suburbanization of the country, which was bolstered through phenomena like white flight.

=== Privately-funded developments ===
Founded by Robert E. Simon in 1964, Reston, Virginia became the first modern planned American New Town and quickly became a model and supporting argument for New Town expansion. Reston was planned with the intention of preserving greenspace and the surrounding woodlands, while developing dense village centers with unique architectural styles, shops, and things to do. Reston is one of the few success stories from the "New Town" boom, today boasting a population of 61,147 and rated the best place to live in Virginia in 2018. Its "cluster" principle of transit hubs and dense community centers paired with public parks and attractions takes form in many urban planning principles today.

Columbia, Maryland was founded in 1967 by James Rouse and planned with New Town principles. The area 15 miles outside of Washington, D.C., was initially split into six self-contained villages that surrounded the Town Center and mall. Each would have a village center - complete with its own shopping center, high school, and recreation facilities. Also included were interfaith centers to preserve land and host several religious denominations. Rouse was prolific in promoting mixed-use development in this development. Today, Columbia has a population of more than 100,000 and is regarded for its sense of community and early adoption of pedestrian-centric planning.

Reston and Columbia were notable New Towns from this period, though they still underwent financial restructuring or bankruptcy.

=== Publicly-funded developments ===
After relative success in Reston and Columbia, new towns in the United States received federal support and funding after passage of the Housing and Urban Development Act of 1970. This law authorized the Secretary of Housing and Urban Development to finance property acquisition and development for the purpose of building new communities. Taking example from European New Town programs, developers in the United States planned new communities across the country, including: St. Charles, Maryland; Maumelle, Arkansas; The Woodlands, Texas; Soul City, North Carolina; Harbison, South Carolina; Shenandoah, Georgia; Jonathan, Minnesota; Park Forest South, Illinois; Cedar-Riverside, Minneapolis, Minnesota; Riverton, New York; Flower Mound, Texas; San Antonio Ranch, Texas; Gananda, New York; and Newfields, Ohio.

Of the fourteen communities funded under America's Title VII New Towns Program, thirteen went bankrupt. Financial losses, struggles attracting industry, and inadequate state and local involvement led to the program's rapid demise. For the thirteen communities that went bankrupt, loan guarantees of $300 million and assistance of $72 million were provided by the government. The Program was shut down in 1976, just six years after its founding.

== New Towns in the Soviet Union ==
The Soviet Union was a leader in New Town construction during the Cold War period. During the tenure of Nikita Khrushchev, the Soviet Union sought to exceed the United States in terms of efficiency and innovation in housing and improving quality of life. The Soviet Union therefore built Sotsgorod (socialist cities).

Some of these were intended as satellite cities to major urban areas like Moscow and Leningrad. A larger amount were planned as new industrial hubs by the State Planning Committee. More than half of these were built in Siberia.

By 1960, the Soviet Union had built between 900 and 1,000 novy gorod (new towns), which comprised 60% of the Soviet Union's urban area. Approximately 30 million people lived in the Soviet new towns. Industrial new towns typically were linear cities planned according the principles of N.A. Miliutin and other disurbanists.

The Soviet new town approach inspired other efforts in the socialist bloc, including in China.

== New Towns in China ==
China developed a "21st century new town movement". The policy foundation behind the movement is the 1998 constitutional reform (which separated land-use rights from land ownership, which continued to be the state's ownership interest), the 1990 Urban Planning Law, and the 1994 fiscal reform (which changed the division of local and central government revenues and tax). These reforms increased the economic focus on cities and advanced urbanization in China.

The Chinese government and state-owned enterprises have worked with African countries to develop new towns on that continent, such as Quilamba.

== See also ==
- Town and country planning in the United Kingdom
- Urban Planning
- New Urbanism
- Garden City Movement
- Planned Community
- Suburbia
