= The Girl Who Couldn't Say No =

- Directed by: Franco Brusati
- Written by: Franco Brusati; Ennio De Concini
- Starring: Virna Lisi; George Segal; Lila Kedrova; Paola Pitagora; Akim Tamiroff
- Cinematography: Ennio Guarnieri
- Edited by: Franco Arcalli
- Music by: Riz Ortolani
- Release date: 1968
- Country: Italy

Tenderly (internationally released as The Girl Who Couldn't Say No, also known as Il suo modo di fare) is a 1968 Italian comedy film directed by Franco Brusati. It was referred as "a successful attempt to refresh the American sophisticated comedy with themes and sensibilities of today" and its style was compared to Frank Capra's.

== Plot ==
After fifteen years apart, a young, motivated surgeon named Franco (Segal) runs into his childhood friend Yolanda (Lisi) in Rome. They fall in love and travel to Florence together, but Yolanda's unpredictable, often unusual personality makes the future of their relationship highly uncertain.

== Cast ==
- Virna Lisi : Yolanda
- George Segal : Franco
- Lila Kedrova : Yolanda's Mother
- Akim Tamiroff : Uncle Egidio
- Paola Pitagora : Widow
- Mario Brega : Cripple
- Riccardo Billi : Salesman
- Anne Cumming : Franco's mother

== Production ==
It was known during shooting as Runaround.
