= Salford East =

Parliamentary constituency in the United Kingdom, 1950–1997

- Former borough constituency for the House of Commons
- Salford East in Greater Manchester, showing boundaries used from 1983–1997

1950–1997
- Seats: one
- Created from: Salford North and Salford South
- Replaced by: Salford

Salford East was a parliamentary constituency in the City of Salford in Greater Manchester. It returned one Member of Parliament (MP) to the House of Commons of the Parliament of the United Kingdom.

The constituency was created for the 1950 general election, and abolished for the 1997 general election, when it was partially replaced by the new Salford constituency.

== Boundaries ==
Salford East in Lancashire, boundaries used 1974–1983

1950–1983: The County Borough of Salford wards of Albert Park, Crescent, Kersal, Mandley Park, Ordsall Park, Regent, St Matthias, and Trinity.

1983–1997: The City of Salford wards of Blackfriars, Broughton, Claremont, Kersal, Langworthy, Ordsall, and Pendleton.

== Members of Parliament ==
Election	Member	Party
1950	Edward Hardy	Labour
1955	Frank Allaun	Labour
1983	Stan Orme	Labour
1997	constituency abolished: see Salford	

== Elections ==
=== Elections in the 1950s ===
General election 1950: Salford East
Party	Candidate	Votes	%	±%
Labour	Edward Hardy	26,783	54.2	
Conservative	W. Sinclair	18,625	37.6	
Liberal	Sydney Needoff	4,057	8.2	
Majority		8,158	16.6	
Turnout		49,465	81.1	
Labour win (new seat)				

General election 1951: Salford East
Party	Candidate	Votes	%	±%
Labour	Edward Hardy	27,729	57.0	+2.8
Conservative	John E Parkinson	20,951	43.0	+5.4
Majority		6,778	14.0	−2.6
Turnout		48,680	79.7	−1.4
Labour hold		Swing	−1.3	

General election 1955: Salford East
Party	Candidate	Votes	%	±%
Labour	Frank Allaun	20,351	52.2	−4.8
Conservative	John Whiteley	18,623	47.8	+4.8
Majority		1,728	4.4	−9.6
Turnout		38,974	69.8	−9.9
Labour hold		Swing	−4.8	

General election 1959: Salford East
Party	Candidate	Votes	%	±%
Labour	Frank Allaun	20,639	54.6	+2.4
Conservative	John Higham Franks	17,171	45.4	−2.4
Majority		3,468	9.2	+4.8
Turnout		37,810	73.8	+4.0
Labour hold		Swing	+2.4	

=== Elections in the 1960s ===
General election 1964: Salford East
Party	Candidate	Votes	%	±%
Labour	Frank Allaun	19,641	61.1	+6.5
Conservative	John H. Franks	12,498	38.9	−6.5
Majority		7,143	22.2	+13.0
Turnout		32,139	66.8	−7.0
Labour hold		Swing	+6.5	

General election 1966: Salford East
Party	Candidate	Votes	%	±%
Labour	Frank Allaun	18,409	67.2	+6.1
Conservative	Gerald W.G. FitzSimons	9,000	32.8	−6.1
Majority		9,409	34.4	+12.2
Turnout		27,409	61.1	−5.7
Labour hold		Swing	+6.1	

=== Elections in the 1970s ===
General election 1970: Salford East
Party	Candidate	Votes	%	±%
Labour	Frank Allaun	15,853	55.8	−11.4
Conservative	John Bryan Leck	9,583	33.7	+0.9
Liberal	Allan Stewart Bell	3,000	10.6	New
Majority		6,270	22.1	−12.3
Turnout		28,436	62.2	+1.1
Labour hold		Swing	−6.2	

General election February 1974: Salford East
Party	Candidate	Votes	%	±%
Labour	Frank Allaun	14,426	54.5	−1.3
Conservative	Betty Knightly	7,495	28.3	−5.4
Liberal	Howard Watkin	4,536	17.1	+6.5
Majority		6,931	26.2	+4.1
Turnout		26,457	66.4	+4.2
Labour hold		Swing	+2.1	

General election October 1974: Salford East
Party	Candidate	Votes	%	±%
Labour	Frank Allaun	14,276	59.8	+5.3
Conservative	Stephen Reid Latimer	6,440	27.0	−1.3
Liberal	Allan Stewart Bell	3,160	13.2	−3.9
Majority		7,836	32.8	+6.6
Turnout		23,876	59.5	−6.9
Labour hold		Swing	+3.3	

General election 1979: Salford East
Party	Candidate	Votes	%	±%
Labour	Frank Allaun	13,453	63.9	+4.1
Conservative	Stephen Reid Latimer	7,597	36.1	+9.1
Majority		5,856	27.8	−5.0
Turnout		21,050	64.3	+4.8
Labour hold		Swing	−2.5	

=== Elections in the 1980s ===
General election 1983: Salford East
Party	Candidate	Votes	%	±%
Labour	Stan Orme	21,373	53.7	−9.3
Conservative	Simon Cole	11,832	29.7	−6.7
SDP	Adrian C. Williams	6,190	15.6	New
Workers Revolutionary	Stuart Carter	417	1.1	New
Majority		9,541	24.0	
Turnout		39,812	62.3	
Labour hold		Swing		

Note: This constituency underwent major boundary changes for the 1983 election and so changes are based on notional figures.

General election 1987: Salford East
Party	Candidate	Votes	%	±%
Labour	Stan Orme	22,555	58.8	+5.1
Conservative	Charles McFall	10,499	27.4	−2.3
SDP	Patrick Keaveney	5,105	13.3	−2.3
Workers Revolutionary	Stephen Murray	201	0.5	−0.6
Majority		12,056	31.4	+7.4
Turnout		38,360	66.0	+3.7
Labour hold		Swing	+3.7	

=== Elections in the 1990s ===
General election 1992: Salford East
Party	Candidate	Votes	%	±%
Labour	Stan Orme	20,327	60.0	+1.2
Conservative	David A. Berens	9,092	26.8	−0.6
Liberal Democrats	Norman J. Owen	3,836	11.3	−2.0
Green	Mark T. Stanley	463	1.4	New
Natural Law	Christopher C.B. Craig	150	0.4	New
Majority		11,235	33.2	+1.8
Turnout		33,868	64.4	−1.6
Labour hold		Swing	+0.9	
