= Edward Hardy (politician) =

British politician (1884–1960)

Edward Arthur Hardy
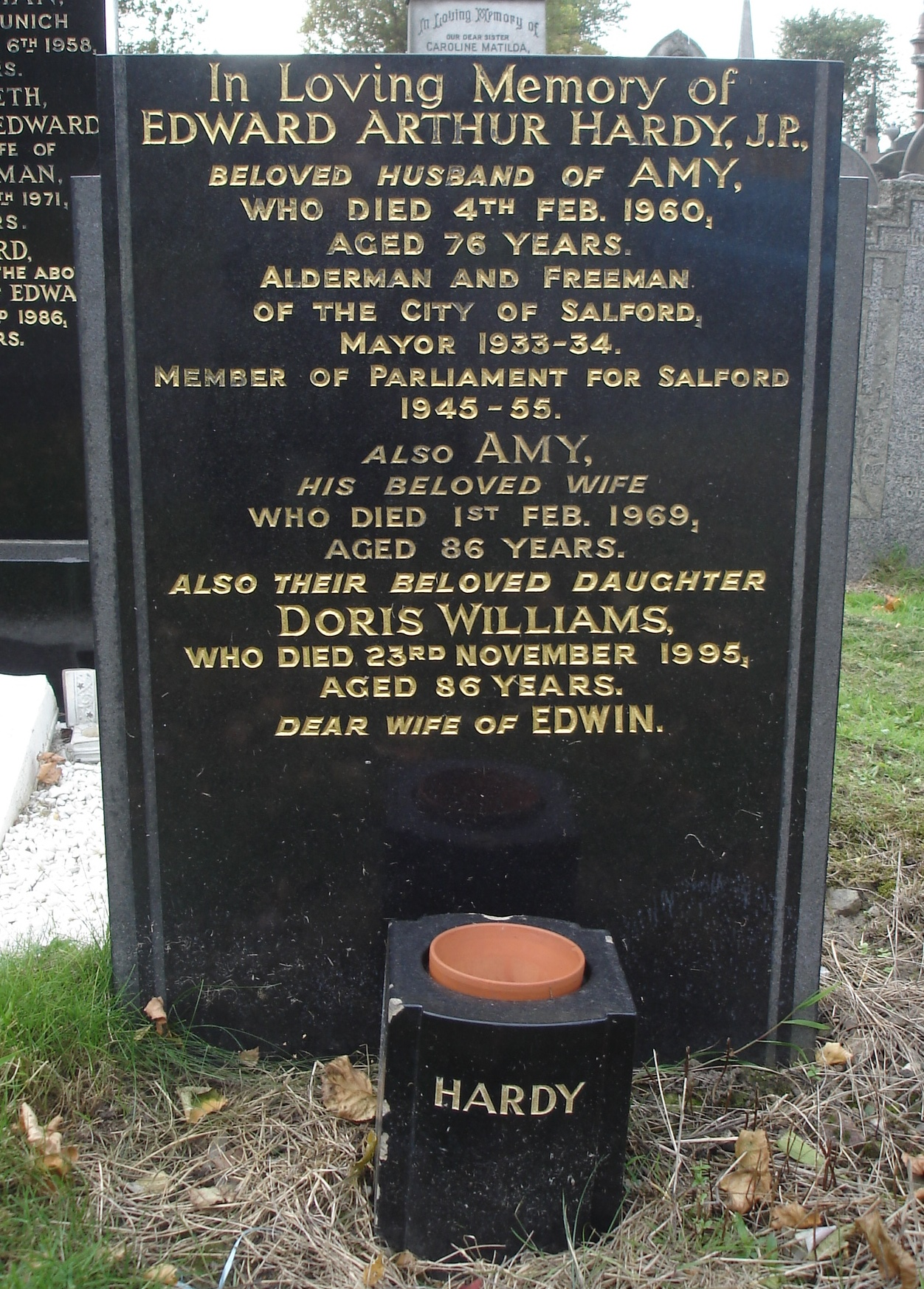
- Edward Arthur Hardy's headstone, Weaste cemetery
- Born: Edward Arthur Hardy; 1884; Nottingham, England
- Died: 4 February 1960 (aged 75–76)

Edward Arthur Hardy (1884 – 4 February 1960) was a British Labour politician.

== Biography ==
Born in Nottingham in 1884, he moved to Salford, Lancashire and was educated at St Clement's Church School before beginning work as a barber's assistant at a young age. He became involved in the local politics, and was elected to Salford City Council. He was Mayor of Salford in 1933/34.

At the 1945 general election he was elected as Labour member of parliament for Salford South. The Salford South constituency was subsequently abolished, and Hardy was elected as MP for the new Salford East constituency in 1950, and re-elected in 1951. He retired from the Commons in 1955.

Hardy returned to Salford council and was an alderman and leader of the council when he was awarded the freedom of the city in October 1959.

He died shortly afterwards in February 1960, aged 75, and was buried in Weaste Cemetery, Salford. He had married Amy Gorman in 1907.

Parliament of the United Kingdom
Preceded by John Joseph Stourton	Member of Parliament for Salford South; 1945 – 1950	Constituency abolished
New constituency	Member of Parliament for Salford East; 1950 – 1955	Succeeded by Frank Allaun
