= Salford South =

Parliamentary constituency in the United Kingdom, 1885–1950

- Former borough constituency for the House of Commons
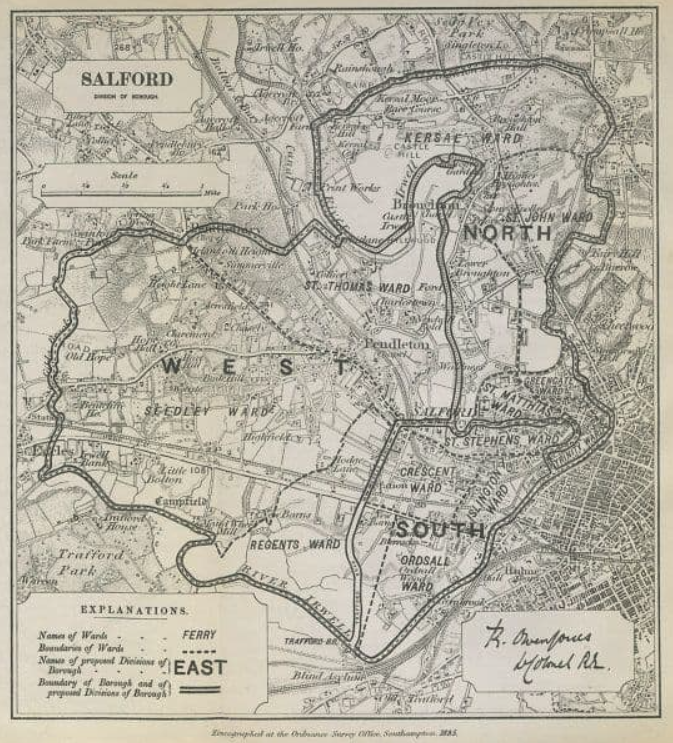
- 1885 map by Robert Owen Jones

1885–1950
- Seats: one
- Created from: Salford
- Replaced by: Salford East and Salford West

Salford South was a parliamentary constituency in the City of Salford in Greater Manchester from 1885 until 1950. It returned one Member of Parliament (MP) to the House of Commons of the Parliament of the United Kingdom.

== History ==
The constituency was created for the 1885 general election by the Redistribution of Seats Act 1885, which split the two-member Salford constituency into three divisions: Salford North, Salford South and Salford West. It was abolished for the 1950 general election.

== Boundaries ==
=== 1885–1918 ===
The constituency of Salford, South Division was created by the Redistribution of Seats Act 1885, and consisted of the following wards of the Borough of Salford: Crescent, Islington, Ordsall, St. Stephen's, and the part of Regent Ward east of the centre of Trafford Road.

=== 1918–1950 ===
The Representation of the People Act 1918 reorganised constituencies throughout Great Britain and Ireland. Salford South was redefined as consisting of seven wards of the county borough of Salford: Crescent, Islington, Ordsall, Regent, Trafford, Trinity and Weaste.

=== Abolition ===
The next redistribution of parliamentary constituencies took place under the Representation of the People Act 1948, and this led to the abolition of the Salford South constituency. Its area was divided between the borough constituencies of Salford East and Salford West.

== Members of Parliament ==
| Election | Member | Party |
|---|---|---|
| 1885 | William Mather | Liberal |
| 1886 | Sir Henry Hoyle Howorth | Conservative |
| 1900 | James Grimble Groves | Conservative |
| 1906 | Hilaire Belloc | Liberal |
| 1910 | Sir Anderson Barlow | Conservative |
| 1923 | Joseph Toole | Labour |
| 1924 | Edmund Ashworth Radford | Conservative |
| 1929 | Joseph Toole | Labour |
| 1931 | John Stourton | Conservative |
| 1945 | Edward Arthur Hardy | Labour |
| 1950 | constituency abolished | |

== Election results ==
=== Elections in the 1880s ===
General election 1885: Salford South
| Party | Candidate | Votes | % | ±% |
|---|---|---|---|---|
| Liberal | William Mather | 3,761 | 50.4 | |
| Conservative | Thomas Gibson Bowles | 3,706 | 49.6 | |
| Majority | | 55 | 0.8 | |
| Turnout | | 7,467 | 85.7 | |
| Registered electors | | 8,717 | | |
| Liberal win (new seat) | | | | |

General election 1886: Salford South
| Party | Candidate | Votes | % | ±% |
|---|---|---|---|---|
| Conservative | Henry Howorth | 3,615 | 50.9 | +1.3 |
| Liberal | William Mather | 3,489 | 49.1 | −1.3 |
| Majority | | 126 | 1.8 | N/A |
| Turnout | | 7,104 | 81.5 | −4.2 |
| Registered electors | | 8,717 | | |
| Conservative gain from Liberal | | Swing | +1.3 | |

=== Elections in the 1890s ===
General election 1892: Salford South
| Party | Candidate | Votes | % | ±% |
|---|---|---|---|---|
| Conservative | Henry Howorth | 3,406 | 46.5 | −4.4 |
| Liberal | Alexander Forrest | 3,369 | 46.0 | −3.1 |
| Social Democratic Federation | William Knight Hall | 553 | 7.5 | New |
| Majority | | 37 | 0.5 | −1.3 |
| Turnout | | 7,328 | 80.9 | −0.6 |
| Registered electors | | 9,060 | | |
| Conservative hold | | Swing | −0.7 | |

General election 1895: Salford South
| Party | Candidate | Votes | % | ±% |
|---|---|---|---|---|
| Conservative | Henry Howorth | 3,384 | 45.1 | −1.4 |
| Liberal | Alexander Forrest | 3,310 | 44.1 | −1.9 |
| Social Democratic Federation | H. W. Hobart | 813 | 10.8 | +3.3 |
| Majority | | 74 | 1.0 | +0.5 |
| Turnout | | 7,507 | 81.5 | +0.6 |
| Registered electors | | 9,215 | | |
| Conservative hold | | Swing | +0.3 | |

=== Elections in the 1900s ===
Mond

General election 1900: Salford South
| Party | Candidate | Votes | % | ±% |
|---|---|---|---|---|
| Conservative | James Grimble Groves | 4,207 | 58.5 | +13.4 |
| Liberal | Alfred Mond | 2,980 | 41.5 | −2.6 |
| Majority | | 1,227 | 17.0 | +16.0 |
| Turnout | | 7,187 | 78.9 | −2.6 |
| Registered electors | | 9,109 | | |
| Conservative hold | | Swing | +8.0 | |

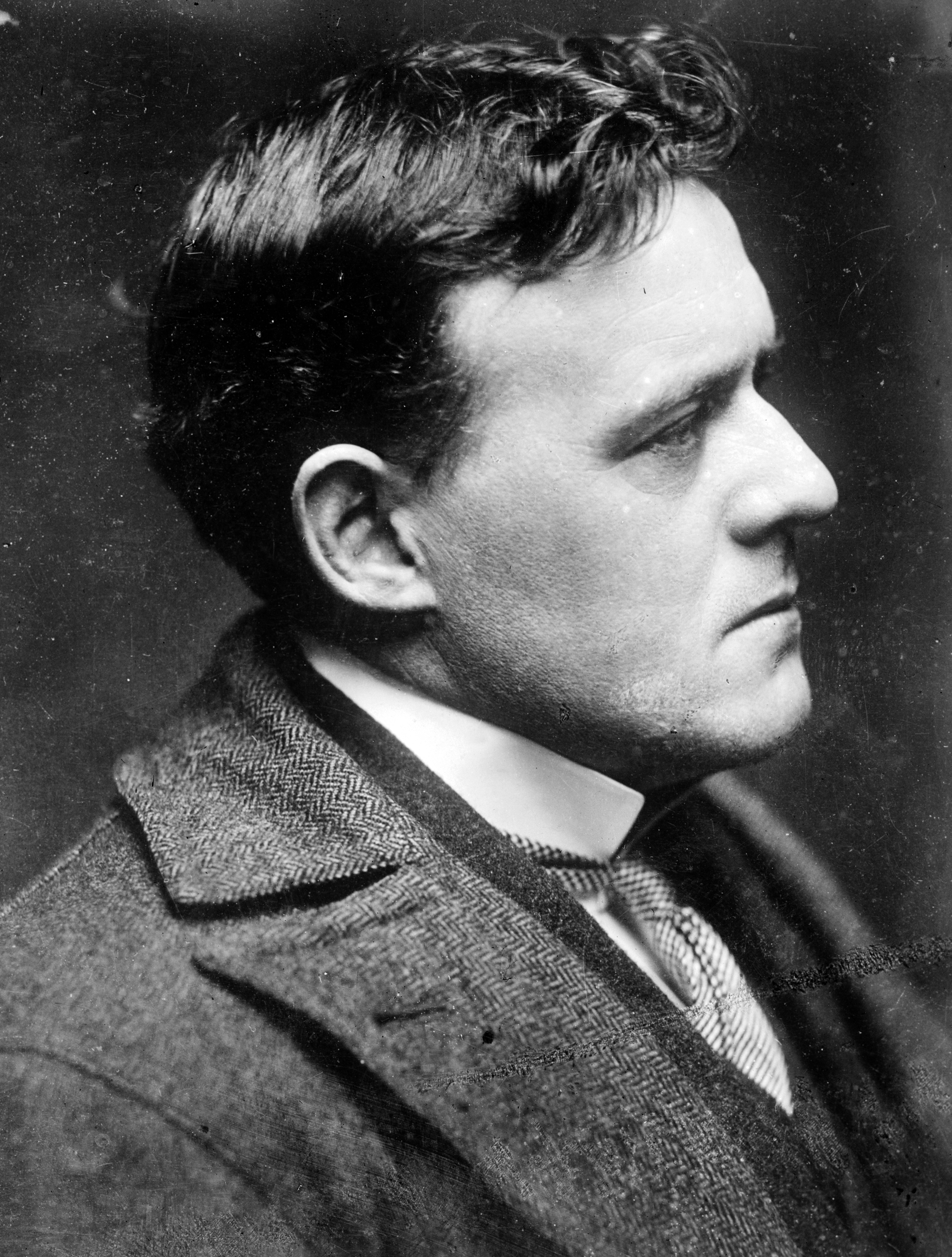
Belloc

General election 1906: Salford South
| Party | Candidate | Votes | % | ±% |
|---|---|---|---|---|
| Liberal | Hilaire Belloc | 4,230 | 55.6 | +14.1 |
| Conservative | James Grimble Groves | 3,378 | 44.4 | −14.1 |
| Majority | | 852 | 11.2 | N/A |
| Turnout | | 7,608 | 88.0 | +9.1 |
| Registered electors | | 8,645 | | |
| Liberal gain from Conservative | | Swing | +14.1 | |

=== Elections in the 1910s ===
General election January 1910: Salford South
| Party | Candidate | Votes | % | ±% |
|---|---|---|---|---|
| Liberal | Hilaire Belloc | 3,952 | 52.1 | −3.5 |
| Conservative | Anderson Barlow | 3,636 | 47.9 | +3.5 |
| Majority | | 316 | 4.2 | −7.0 |
| Turnout | | 7,588 | 90.9 | +2.9 |
| Registered electors | | 8,344 | | |
| Liberal hold | | Swing | −3.5 | |

General election December 1910: Salford South
| Party | Candidate | Votes | % | ±% |
|---|---|---|---|---|
| Conservative | Anderson Barlow | 3,664 | 51.6 | +3.7 |
| Liberal | C. Russell | 3,439 | 48.4 | −3.7 |
| Majority | | 316 | 3.2 | N/A |
| Turnout | | 7,103 | 85.1 | −5.8 |
| Registered electors | | 8,344 | | |
| Conservative gain from Liberal | | Swing | +3.7 | |

General Election 1914–15:

Another General Election was required to take place before the end of 1915. The political parties had been making preparations for an election to take place and by July 1914, the following candidates had been selected;

- Unionist: Anderson Barlow
- Liberal: Francis Benedict Vincent Norris

General election 1918: Salford South
| Party | | Candidate | Votes | % | ±% |
|---|---|---|---|---|---|
| C | Unionist | Anderson Barlow | 14,265 | 71.1 | +19.5 |
| | Labour | James Gorman | 3,807 | 19.0 | New |
| | Liberal | Francis Benedict Vincent Norris | 1,994 | 9.9 | −38.5 |
| Majority | | | 10,458 | 52.1 | +48.9 |
| Turnout | | | 20,066 | 53.8 | −31.3 |
| | Unionist hold | | Swing | +29.0 | |
C indicates candidate endorsed by the coalition government.

=== Elections in the 1920s ===
General election 1922: Salford South
| Party | Candidate | Votes | % | ±% |
|---|---|---|---|---|
| Unionist | Anderson Barlow | Unopposed | N/A | N/A |
| Unionist hold | | | | |

General election 1923: Salford South
| Party | Candidate | Votes | % | ±% |
|---|---|---|---|---|
| Labour | Joseph Toole | 12,097 | 46.0 | New |
| Unionist | Anderson Barlow | 9,366 | 35.6 | N/A |
| Liberal | Edgar Rees Jones | 4,851 | 18.4 | New |
| Majority | | 2,731 | 10.4 | N/A |
| Turnout | | 26,314 | 72.2 | N/A |
| Labour gain from Unionist | | Swing | N/A | |

General election 1924: Salford South
| Party | Candidate | Votes | % | ±% |
|---|---|---|---|---|
| Unionist | Edmund Radford | 15,163 | 51.2 | +15.6 |
| Labour | Joseph Toole | 14,455 | 48.8 | +2.8 |
| Majority | | 708 | 3.4 | N/A |
| Turnout | | 29,618 | 79.6 | +7.4 |
| Unionist gain from Liberal | | Swing | | |

General election 1929: Salford South
| Party | Candidate | Votes | % | ±% |
|---|---|---|---|---|
| Labour | Joseph Toole | 20,100 | 54.4 | +5.6 |
| Unionist | Edmund Radford | 16,846 | 45.6 | −5.6 |
| Majority | | 3,254 | 8.8 | N/A |
| Turnout | | 36,946 | 78.7 | −0.9 |
| Labour gain from Unionist | | Swing | | |

=== Elections in the 1930s ===
General election 1931: Salford South
| Party | Candidate | Votes | % | ±% |
|---|---|---|---|---|
| Conservative | John Stourton | 22,140 | 59.1 | +13.5 |
| Labour | Joseph Toole | 15,302 | 40.9 | −13.5 |
| Majority | | 6,838 | 18.2 | N/A |
| Turnout | | 37,442 | | |
| Conservative gain from Labour | | Swing | | |

General election 1935: Salford South
| Party | Candidate | Votes | % | ±% |
|---|---|---|---|---|
| Conservative | John Stourton | 16,236 | 50.5 | −8.6 |
| Labour | Joseph Toole | 15,932 | 49.5 | +8.6 |
| Majority | | 304 | 1.0 | −17.2 |
| Turnout | | 32,168 | 73.4 | |
| Conservative hold | | Swing | | |

General Election 1939–40

Another General Election was required to take place before the end of 1940. The political parties had been making preparations for an election to take place and by the Autumn of 1939, the following candidates had been selected;

- Conservative: John Stourton
- Labour:

=== Elections in the 1940s ===
General election 1945: Salford South
| Party | Candidate | Votes | % | ±% |
|---|---|---|---|---|
| Labour | Edward Arthur Hardy | 13,941 | 60.4 | +10.9 |
| Conservative | Murrough Richard O'Brien | 9,150 | 39.6 | −10.9 |
| Majority | | 4,791 | 20.8 | N/A |
| Turnout | | 23,091 | 72.6 | −0.8 |
| Labour gain from Conservative | | Swing | | |
