= 2000 in comics =

Notable events of 2000 in comics.

== Events ==
=== Year overall ===
- German website Comicforum goes live
- Rebellion Developments takes over 2000 AD from Fleetway.
- The merger of AOL and Time Warner is announced.
- In Bologna, the cartoonist Igort and the editor Carlo Barbieri found Coconino press, a publishing house specialized in authorial comics; the firm takes its name from the Arizona county, which served as the setting of Krazy Cat’s strips.
- Jeroom creates his gag comic Ridder Bauknecht.

=== January ===
- January 3: The final daily episode of Charles M. Schulz' Peanuts appears in print. The Sunday comics continue one month longer.
- January 4: The British comics magazine Buster ends its run after 40 years.
- The Voronov plot, di Yves Sentie e Andrè Juliard, fourteenth episode of the series Blake and Mortimer.
- Beginning of Apocalypse: The twelve, a cross-over involving all the X-Men comic books.
- Sotto un nuovo sole (Under a new sun) by Alessandro Sisti and Corrado Mastrantuono, marks a turning point for the PKNA series, with the destruction of the evil Evronian empire by the super-heroine Xadhoom and the final sacrifice of the same, for her people's sake. In the following months, the main PKNA storylines end and many characters of the series (allies or enemies) leave the scene.
- B D. Meurtres, by Andrè-Paul Duchateau and Tibet.
- La piste des maudits (The trail of the damned), by Francois Corteggiani and Michel Blanc-Dumont, eleventh episode of La jeunesse de Blueberry.

=== February ===
- February 13:
  - After nearly half a century of publication the final episode of Charles M. Schulz's long-running and best-selling newspaper comic Peanuts is published. Schulz had announced his retirement a month earlier. The episode happens to coincide with Schulz' death, a day before the final episode is published. Both events make headlines all over the world.
  - The state of California declares Peanuts Day.
- The final episode of Daniel Clowes' David Boring is prepublished in Eightball.

=== March ===
- Legion of Super-Heroes vol. 3 is canceled by DC with issue #125.
- The discontinuation of Big Panda results in the formation of Keenspot.
- First issue of Batman: Gotham Knights.
- Edward Reiser, director of the Alpha Agency and superior of Nathan Never, is killed in the album Il patto (The deal), by Antonio Serra and Roberto De Angelis. His death (that in the following years turns out to be a setup) causes significant revelations and changes in the series, with the emerging of the new super-villain Mister Alpha.
- Le prophete, by Morris and Patrick Nordmann.
- In Buffy the vampire slayer, Old friend, by Andi Watson and Cliff Richards, ending of the Bad bloods saga.

=== April ===
- Il figlio del diavolo (The devil's son) by Mauro Boselli and Majo; first issue of the series Dampyr, with the debut of the principal characters (the vampire hunters Harlan Draka and his sidekicks Kurjak and Tesla.) In the following album, La stirpe della notte (The race of the night), the vampyre Draka, nemesis (as well as father) of the hero, makes his debut.
- Shenzhen by Guy Delisle.
- First issue of the limited series The punisher (or Welcome back, Frank), by Garth Ennis.
- First issue of Powers, by Brian Michael Bendis and Michael Avon Oeming.

=== May ===
- May 27:
  - The final episode of Mort Walker's Boner's Ark is published.
  - Dozens of U.S. cartoonists pay tribute to the final episode of Peanuts on the same day. Originally intended as a tribute, it becomes an unintential in memoriam since Schulz died unexpectedly earlier this year.
- May 28: After 87 years of publication Bringing Up Father (originally created by George McManus in 1911) is terminated.
- First issue of Swamp Thing (third series) by Brian K. Vaughan
- Last day in Vietnam, by Will Eisner.
- in the Danish magazine Anders & Co., Riverside Rovers, by Paul Halas and Francisco Rodriguez Peinado; debut of Felicity Fieldmouse, mother of Morty and Ferdie and sister of Mickey Mouse.

=== June ===
- Frontiere sanglante (Bloody frontier) – by Jean Giraud and Michel Rouge, final album of the Marshall Blueberry series.

=== July ===
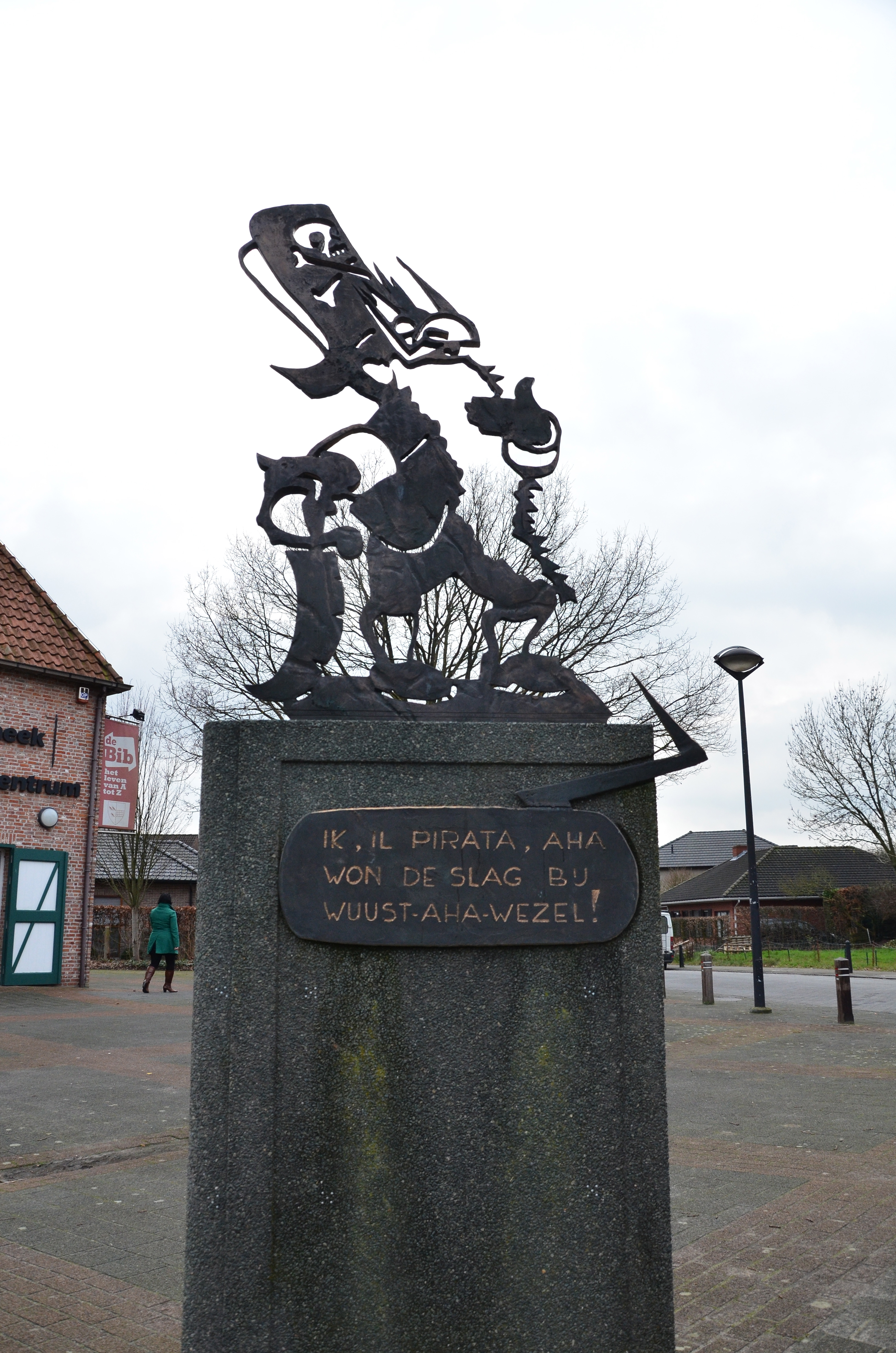
Statue of Abraham Tuizentfloot in Wuustwezel

- July 1: Comics character Abraham Tuizentfloot receives a statue in Wuustwezel, Belgium.
- July 19: The Flemish newspapers Het Laatste Nieuws and De Nieuwe Gazet change the title of their weekly children comics supplement De Plopkrant, based on the popular TV show Kabouter Plop, into De Plopsakrant, based on the theme park Plopsaland.
- I coraggiosi, by Michele Masiero and Lina Buffolente, final adventure of Comandante Mark.
- Reinventing Comics: How Imagination and Technology Are Revolutionizing an Art Form, by Scott McCloud.

=== August ===
- August 1: In the Italian Disney magazine Topolino, the first chapter of the Mickey Mouse story Topolino e le cronache della frontiera (Mickey and the frontier chronicles) by Giorgio Pezzin is published. It's a long space opera starring characters of the Mickey Mouse universe.
- August 25: The death of Donald Duck comics artist Carl Barks makes global headlines, but predominantly in Europe and Latin America where his comics are far more beloved than in his home country.
- August 30: Ring of fire, by Doug Petrie and Ryan Sook.
- Sotto il ponte di pietra (Under the stone bridge) by Mauro Boselli and Luca Rossi; debut of two recurring characters in the Dampyr series, both living in Prague: the angel Caleb Lost and the amiable devil Nikolaus.

=== September ===
- The final issue of the Flemish comics magazine Stipkrant, a weekly children's supplement of the newspapers Het Nieuwsblad, De Standaard, Het Handelsblad, De Gentenaar and De Landwacht, is published.
- First issue of the Italian magazine Euramaster tuttocolori (Eura), focused on the French comics.
- Pedro and me, graphic novel by Judd Winck.
- September 27: The first episode of Kim Duchateau's comics series Esther Verkest is published in P-Magazine.
- September 29: The first episode of Hanco Kolk and Peter de Wit's comic strip S1NGLE appears in the newspaper Het Parool.

=== October ===
- 5 October: In the Danish Disney comics magazine Anders And & Co. the first episode of The Three caballeros ride again! by Don Rosa is published.
- 17 October: In the Italian Disney comics magazine Topolino, the first episode of Paperino e il seguito della storia (Donald and the continuation of the history), by Luciano Bottaro is published. It's a sequel to the 1958 story Il Dottor Paperus..
- 23–24 October: During the Stripdagen in Den Bosch, the Netherlands, cartoonist Willem wins the Stripschapprijs. Karin van Wylick of the library of Rotterdam wins the P. Hans Frankfurtherprijs.
- The story of a childhood, first volume of Persepolis, by Marjane Satrapi (L’association).
- Deogratias: A Tale of Rwanda, by Jean-Philippe Stassen (Dupuis).
- Giles: beyond the pale, by Christopher Golden, Tom Sniegoski and Eric Powell (Dark Horse).
- First issue of Ultimate Spider-Man (Marvel).
- Top secret by Jean Van Hamme and William Vance, fourteenth album of the XIII series.
- La Sorcière... mal aimée (The unloved witch) by André-Paul Duchâteau and Tibet.

=== November ===
- November 10: Quelque part entre les ombres, by Juan Díaz Canales and Juanjo Guarnido, first album of the Blacksad series (Dargaud).
- Dentiblù (nickname of the two authors Stefano Bonfanti and Barbara Barbieri) publishes amateurishly Zannablù e il segreto della besciamella (Blue fang and the secret of the béchamel sauce), first album of Zannablù, an anthropomorphic animals series with demented humor.
- La città gialla (The jellow city) by Alessandro Barbucci and Barbara Canepa, first album of the series Sky Doll.
- In Dylan Dog gigante, L’esercito del male (The army of the Evil), by Robin Wood and Giovanni Freghieri, the longest Dylan Dog story written until then (236 pages).
- Les quatre fleuves (The four rivers) by Fred Vargas and Edmond Baudoin.

=== December ===
- December 8: The kids are alright, by Chynna Clugston Flores (ONI press), first album of the Blue Monday series.
- Minor Miracles, by Will Eisner.
- Cairo! by Jean and Philippe Graton; Michel Vaillant participates in the Dakar rally.
- Golden Gate, by Jean Van Hamme and Philippe Francq.
- Dutch comic artist Peter Pontiac publishes his autobiographical graphic novel Kraut, about his father's past as a Nazi collaborator and his mysterious death several decades later. The book will be updated twice, in 2005 and 2011.

== Publications by release date ==
=== February ===
- Strange Adventures vol. 2, #4, final issue cover-dated February (Vertigo)

=== October ===
- JSA Annual #1 (DC Comics)

== Deaths ==
=== January ===
- January 1: Chon Day, American cartoonist (Brother Sebastian), dies at age 92.
- January 5: Goseki Kojima, Japanese comics artist (co-creator of Lone Wolf and Cub), dies at age 71.
- January 6: Don Martin, American comics artist (Mad, Captain Klutz), dies at age 68.
- January 14: Pat Boyette, American comics artist (co-creator of The Peacemaker), dies at age 76.
- January 19: Antonio Palacios, Spanish-Argentine comics artist (Mac Coy, Garin), dies at age 78.
- January 26: Keith Willingham, American comics artist (Blast Blair), dies at age 74.
- January 31: Gil Kane, Latvian-American comic book artist (Detective Comics, Green Lantern, Mystery in Space, Spider-Man), dies at age 73.

=== February ===
- February 1: Bill Holroyd, British comics artist (Alf Wit the Ancient Brit, Plum McDuff, Wuzzy Wiz, Magic Is His Biz, Screwy Driver, Boy With Iron Hands, Spunky And His Spider, Jack Silver, Wandering Willie, Ding Dong Belle, Danny Longlegs, The Fighting Frasers), dies at age 80.
- February 12: Charles M. Schulz, American comics artist (Peanuts, Young Pillars, It's Only a Game), dies at age 77.
- February 18: Steven Hughes, American comics artist (Chaos! Comics, Lady Death, Evil Ernie), dies at age 46.
- February 18: Will, Belgian comics artist (Isabelle, continued Tif et Tondu), dies at age 72.
- February 19: George Roussos, American comics inker and colorist (DC Comics, EC Comics), dies at age 84.
- February 20:
  - Elliot Caplin, American comics writer (The Heart of Juliet Jones, Dr. Bobbs, Peter Scratch, Big Ben Bolt, Abbie an' Slats, Long Sam, Little Orphan Annie) dies at age 86.
  - Fred Rhoads, American comics artist (Gizmo and Eightball, continued Sad Sack), dies at age 78.
- February 26: György Szitás, Hungarian comics artist and illustrator, dies at age 73.

=== March ===
- March 3: Nicole Van Goethem, Belgian cartoonist, animator and film director (A Greek Tragedy), dies at age 58.
- March 10: John Henry Rouson, American painter, cartoonist and comics artist (Little Sport, Boy and Girl, Ladies Day), dies at age 91.
- March 14: Don Komisarow, American comics artist (The Thropp Family, assisted on Superman, Abbie an' Slats), dies at age 85.
- March 20: Johan Anthierens, Belgian journalist, columnist, critic, writer, publisher and comics writer (De Geheime Avonturen van Kapitein Matthias with Eddy Ryssack), dies from cancer at age 62.

=== April ===
- April 8: Alfredo Alcala, Philippine comics artist (Ukala, Voltar), dies at age 74 from cancer.
- April 15: Edward Gorey, American novelist, illustrator and comics artist (The Doubtful Guest, The Object-Lesson, The Gashlycrumb Tinies) dies at age 75.
- April 16: Jorge Bernuy, Peruvian comic artist (Novac, Yahuar El Guerrero), dies at age 51 or 52.
- April 17: Nikolai Sokolov, Russian painter, illustrator and poster designer (member of the collective Kukryniksy), dies at age 96.
- April 22: Toon Hermans, Dutch comedian and cabaret artist (made humorous cartoons under the title Clownerietjes), dies at age 83.
- April 23: Shigeru Sugiura, Japanese manga artist (Jiraiya the Ninja Boy, Sarutobi Sasuka), dies at age 92.

=== May ===
- May 3: Dario Guzzon, Italian comic artist (member of EsseGesse, co-creator of Captain Miki, Il Grande Blek, Comandante Mark, Kinowa and Alan Mistero), dies at age 74.
- May 10: Dick Sprang, American comics artist (Batman), dies at age 84.
- May 13: Fred Schwab, American comics artist (Lady Luck), dies at age 82.
- May 18: Denis Gifford, British comics writer and artist (Mr. Muscle, Streamline, Tiger-Man), author and historian (The British Comics Catalogue 1874-1974, Stap Me! History of the British Newspaper Strip), dies at age 72.
- May 23: Dwaine B. Tinsley, American comic artist (Chester the Molester), dies at age 54.
- May 25: Elizabeth Durack, Australian painter and comics artist (Nungalla and Jungalla), dies at age 84.

=== June ===
- June 8:
  - Hart Amos, Australian comics artist (The Lost Patrol, continued Devil Doone and Air Hawk and the Flying Doctors), dies at age 86.
  - Jeff MacNelly, American cartoonist and comics artist (Shoe, Pluggers), dies at age 52.
- June 22: Onofrio Bramante, Italian painter and comic artist (Disney comics), dies at age 73.
- June 24: Frans Verschoor, Dutch comics artist (celebrity comics based on Bassie en Adriaan), dies at age 44.
- June 26: Tove Jansson, Finnish novelist, illustrator and comics artist (Moomins), dies at age 86.

=== July ===
- July 14:
  - Bowen, Swedish comics artist (Hörnlands Hylla, continued Tusen Och en Natt), dies at age 71.
  - Alvin Hollingsworth, aka Alvin Holly, American painter and comics artist (worked on Kandy, Martin Keel), dies at age 72.
  - Pepo, Chilean comics artist (Condorito), dies at age 88.
  - Ies Spreekmeester, Dutch comics artist (Pepspotter, Bokwert), dies at age 86.
- July 17: Philippe Vandooren, Belgian novelist, journalist and publisher (chief editor of Spirou 1982–1987), dies at age 65.
- July 28: Chic Stone, American comics artist and inker (inker for Jack Kirby, Archie Comics,...) dies at age 77.
- July 31: Lars Jansson, Finnish comics writer and artist (The Moomins, Sophia), dies at age 73.
- Specific date in July unknown: Anibal Uzál, Argentine comic artist (worked on Terco Thomas, El Apache, Derek, Kabul Bengal, Cybersix, Bull Rockett, Disney comics), dies at an unknown age.

=== August ===
- August 8: Glenn Schmitz, American animator and comics artist (Disney comics, continued Scamp), dies at age 70.
- August 25: Carl Barks, American animator and comics artist (Donald Duck, Uncle Scrooge), dies at age 99.
- August 27: Ante Zaninovic, Croatian animator and comics artist (Kljunko, drew comics based on Professor Balthazar), dies at age 65.

=== September ===
- September 5: Palle Nielsen, Danish illustrator, graphic and comics artist (Orfeus og Eurydike), dies at age 80.
- September 9: Takashi Fukutani, Japanese manga artist (Dokudami Tenement, aka The Tokyo Drifter), dies at age 48 from a pulmonary edema.
- September 10: Ben Wicks, British-Canadian cartoonist and comic artist (The Outcasts), dies at age 73.
- September 12: Rafael Miguel Catalá Lucas, Spanish comics artist, dies at age 73 or 74.
- September 13: Rolf Kauka, German comics artist and animated film director (Fix and Foxi), dies at age 83.
- September 20: Sururi Gümen, Turkish-American comics artist (Canbaba, ghosted Kerry Drake and It's Me Dilly, worked for Cracked and Charlton Comics), dies at age 80.
- September 24: Gabrielle Vincent, Belgian painter, children's book writer, illustrator and comic artist (Ernest & Celéstine), dies at age 72.
- September 29: Wim Bijmoer, Dutch comics artist and illustrator (Oessoef Bontebuis), dies at age 86.

=== October ===
- October 3: John Worsley, British comic artist (worked on Tom of the Walls, continued PC49), dies at age 81.
- October 16: Ed Nofziger, American animator and comics artist (Mildred th' Zoo-Keeper's Daughter, Buenos Dias, Animalogic, Chloe, Sir Lim'rick) and writer (Hanna-Barbera comics, Disney comics), dies at age 87.
- October 28: Irving Phillips, American comics artist, playwright, TV scriptwriter, novelist, illustrator and educator (The Strange World of Mr. Mum), dies at age 95.

=== November ===
- November 2: Carlo Santachiara, Italian comics artist and sculptor (Sordello), dies at age 62.
- November 8: Dupa, Belgian comics artist (Cubitus (aka Wowser), continued Chlorophylle), dies at age 55.
- November 20: Vyacheslav Kotyonochkin, Russian animator and comics artist (Nu, pogodi!, aka Well, Just You Wait!), dies at age 73.
- November 23: Ray Burns, American comics artist and illustrator (assisted Rip Kirby and Gil Thorp), dies at age 66.
- November 27: Dorothy Woolfolk, American comics editor and writer (first female comics editor at DC Comics and co-creator of Kryptonite) dies at age 87.

=== December ===
- December 6: Chrystabel Leighton-Porter, British model (played Jane, the title character from Norman Pett's comic strip Jane in a stage show and live-action film adaptation, also posed as her for Pett's comic strip), dies at age 87.
- December 21: Jan Sanders, Dutch cartoonist and illustrator, dies at age 81.
- December 24: Ray Dirgo, American comics artist (Hanna Barbera comics), dies at age 92.
- December 27: Radovan Devlić, Croatian comics artist (Macchu Picchu, Strossmayer), dies at age 49 or 50.

=== Specific date unknown ===
- John L. Curtis, Australian illustrator and comic artist, dies at age 82 or 83.
- Bill Lacey, British comics artist (Mytek the Mighty, continued Blackshirt), dies at age 82 or 83.
- Charles Gilbert, aka Chargil, Imagil, Atgil, Mac K.B., Aagg, Belgian painter, illustrator and comics artist, dies at age 93 or 94.
- Juan Martínez Osete, Spanish comic artist (worked on Capitán Trueno), dies at age 78 or 79.

== Exhibitions and shows ==
- March 17 - April 30: "Bizarro World! The Parallel Universes of Comics & Fine Art" (Cornell Fine Arts Museum, Rollins College, Winter Park, Florida) — exhibition showing the relationship between high art and comics, curated by Theo Lotz and Ronald Abram. Notable fine artists represented: Renee Cox, Tony Oursler, Philip Guston, Laylah Ali. Notable cartoonists represented: Art Spiegelman, Al Capp, Harvey Kurtzman, Will Eisner, R. Crumb, Daniel Clowes, Charles Burns, Ellen Forney, Chris Ware, Kaz

== Conventions ==
- February 5: Alternative Press Expo (Herbst Pavilion, Fort Mason, San Francisco, California)
- March: Big Apple Comic Book Art, and Toy Show (Church of St. Paul the Apostle Auditorium, New York City)
- March 31–April 1: MegaCon (Orlando Expo Center, Orlando, Florida) — guests include Stan Lee and Joe Quesada
- April 7–9: WonderCon (Oakland Convention Center, Oakland, California)
- April 9–16: Making Waves (Los Angeles) — Comic Book Legal Defense Fund benefit luxury cruise to Mexico; creators include Neal Adams, Kurt Busiek, Zander Cannon, Evan Dorkin, Sarah Dyer, Will Eisner, Neil Gaiman, Gilbert Hernandez, Jaime Hernandez, Linda Medley, Frank Miller, Martin Nodell, Brian Pulido, P. Craig Russell, Jeff Smith, Jill Thompson, Adrian Tomine, Matt Wagner, Mark Waid, Chris Ware, and Judd Winick
- April 15: Small Press and Alternative Comics Expo (Ohio Expo Center, Rhodes Center, Columbus, Ohio) — 49 small press comics artist, writers, and publishers (including Matt Feazell, Carla Speed McNeil, Alex Robinson, and William Messner-Loebs) converge for the first annual S.P.A.C.E. show, organized by Bob Corby and Back Porch Comics
- April 23–24: Comics 2000 (Jurys Bristol Hotel, Bristol, Avon, England, U.K.) — presentation of the Eagle Awards, MC'd by Simon Pegg; guests include Steve Pugh, Jim Valentino, Dave Gibbons, Mike Carlin, Gary Spencer Millidge, Alan Grant, Laura DePuy, Karen Berger, Chris Staros, Dave McKinnon, James Hodgkins, Dez Skinn, Gary Marshall, Al Davison, and Grant Morrison
- April 28–30: Pittsburgh Comicon (Pittsburgh, Pennsylvania) — 10,000 attendees
- May 19–21: Motor City Comic Con I (Novi Expo Center, Novi, Michigan) — guests include James Doohan
- June 9–11: All Time Classic New York Comic Book Convention (Westchester County Center, White Plains, New York) — one-time event focused on Silver Age comics. Guest of honor: Barry Windsor-Smith; other guests include Carmine Infantino, Joe Kubert, Marie Severin, Roy Thomas, Julius Schwartz, and Henry Boltinoff
- June 16–18: Heroes Convention (Charlotte Convention Center, Charlotte, North Carolina) — guests include Jim Amash, Terry Austin, John Beatty, Cliff Biggers, Frank Brunner, Kurt Busiek, Nick Cardy, KC Carlson, Richard Case, Todd Dezago, Johanna Draper Carlson, Steve Epting, Lou Ferrigno, Franchesco, Ron Garney, Drew Geraci, Dick Giordano, Sam Glanzman, Gene Gonzales, Tom Grummett, Jackson Guice, Cully Hamner, Scott Hampton, Tony Harris, Irwin Hasen, Dave Hoover, Adam Hughes, Greg Hyland, Jamal Igle, Stuart Immonen, Carmine Infantino, Georges Jeanty, Nat Jones, Karl Kesel, Barry Kitson, Jim Krueger, Bob Layton, Steve Lieber, Mark Lipka, Nathan Massengill, Angel Medina, Pop Mhan, Philip Moy, Mart Nodell, Phil Noto, George Pérez, Joe Pruett, Joe Quesada, Budd Root, Craig Rousseau, Julius Schwartz, Mike Shoemaker, Steve Skeates, Chris Sprouse, J. David Spurlock, Brian Stelfreeze, Karl Story, Roy Thomas, Tim Townsend, Coy Turnbull, Michael Turner, George Tuska, Dexter Vines, Mark Waid, and Mike Wieringo
- June 23–25: New York Comic and Fantasy Creators Convention (Madison Square Garden, New York City) — 2nd annual show; guests include Jim Starlin, Walt Simonson, Keith Giffen, and John Romita, Jr.
- June 29–July 2: Dragon Con (Hyatt Regency Atlanta/Atlanta Merchandise Mart/Atlanta Apparel Mart, Atlanta, Georgia) — 20,000 attendees
- July 20–23: Comic-Con International (San Diego Convention Center, San Diego, California) — 48,500 attendees; special guests: Kyle Baker, Will Elder, Ric Estrada, Al Feldstein, Phoebe Gloeckner, Jack Kamen, Ben Katchor, Harry Knowles, Harry Lampert, Jeff Loeb, Scott McCloud, Tim Sale, Marie Severin, Kevin Smith, Bryan Talbot, Angelo Torres, Lewis Trondheim, Al Williamson, Gahan Wilson, and Janny Wurts
- August 4–6: Wizard World Chicago (Rosemont Convention Center, Rosemont, Illinois)
- August 12–13: CAPTION: "You Cannot Kill That Which is Already Dead" (Oxford Union Society, Oxford, England)
- August 25–27: Fan Expo Canada (Metro Toronto Convention Centre, Toronto, Ontario, Canada) — 12,763 attendees; guests include Jonathan Frakes, Anthony Head, Roxann Dawson, Hudson Leick, Jeremy Bulloch, Richard Biggs, Peter David, Chris Claremont, Barry Windsor-Smith, Adam Kubert, David Finch (comics), Jae Lee, and Brian Michael Bendis
- August 25–27: Sports Card, Comic Book and Toy Expo (Wildwood Convention Center, Wildwood, Pennsylvania) — guests include William Tucci and Rudy Nebres
- September 14–16: International Comics and Animation Festival (ICAF) / Small Press Expo (SPX) (Holiday Inn Select, Bethesda, Maryland) — guests include Alice Chang, Christian Gasser, Anke Feuchtenberger, Martin tom Dieck, Philippe Dupuy & Charles Berberian, Bill Griffith, Kim Deitch, Will Eisner, Jeff Smith, Henriette Valium, Simon Bossé, Eric Braun, Renée French, Dean Haspiel, Jason Little, Brian Ralph, and Craig Thompson
- October 20–November 5: FIBDA (Amadora, Portugal) — 11th edition of the festival; guests include Rick Veitch, Dave Gibbons, Peter David, Joe Kubert, Jerry Robinson, and Luke Ross
- October 21–22: Motor City Comic Con II (Novi Expo Center, Novi, Michigan) — guests include Dick Ayers, Terri Boyle, Frank Brunner, Sal Buscema, Guy Davis, Dan DeCarlo, Franchesco, Cully Hamner, Adam Hughes, Georges Jeanty, Joseph Michael Linsner, Vince Locke, William Messner-Loebs, Jason Moore, James O'Barr, Mike Okamoto, David Quinn, Greg Rucka, Marie Severin, Brian Stelfreeze, Karl Story, Randy Zimmerman, and Bob May
- November 10–12: National Comic Book, Art, Toy, and Sci-Fi Expo (New York City) — guests include James Doohan, Jerome Blake, Ron Palillo, Apollo Smile, Richard Herd, Pamelyn Ferdin, Carmine Infantino, Jeff Jones, Erik Larsen, Russ Heath, Dick Giordano, Joe Simon, Julie Schwartz, Joe Giella, Frank McLaughlin, Michael Kaluta, Dave Cockrum, Paty Cockrum, Irwin Hasen, Glenn Fabry, John Romita Sr., Jimmy Palmiotti, Amanda Conner, Arnold Drake, Murphy Anderson, Gray Morrow, Mike Esposito, Tom Gill, Andrew Pepoy, Amanda Conner, Jimmy Palmiotti, Mark Texeira, David Wohl, Joseph Michael Linsner, William Tucci, Janet Lupo, Kevin Eastman, Sarah Dyer, Evan Dorkin, Don McGregor, Jim Shooter, Dan DeCarlo, George Tuska, Gill Fox, George Tuska, Graig Weich, Mercy Van Vlack, Ken Gale, Tim Vigil, and David Quinn
- November 24–26: UnCommonCon (Hyatt Regency Hotel-DFW Airport, located by Terminal C at Dallas-Fort Worth International Airport, Dallas, Texas) — 1,200 attendees; guests include author Aaron Allston, author Tracy Hickman, author P.N. Elrod, actor Ted Raimi, Melissa Benson, Babylon 5 actor Jason Carter, The Incredible Hulk actor Lou Ferrigno, actor Victor Lundin, artist Bryan Talbot
- November 25–26: Mid-Ohio Con (Hilton Columbus Hotel at Easton Town Center, Columbus, Ohio)

== First issues by title ==
=== DC Comics ===
Adventures in the Rifle Brigade
Release: October by Vertigo. Writer: Garth Ennis Artist: Carlos Ezquerra.

=== Marvel Comics ===
Midnight Nation
Release: October by Marvel Comics. Writer: J. Michael Straczynski Artist: Gary Frank.

=== Independent titles ===
Requiem Chevalier Vampire
Release: November by Nickel Editions. Writer: Pat Mills Artist: Olivier Ledroit.

== Initial appearances by character name ==
- Nemesis (Soseh Mykros) in JSA annual #1 (October), created by David S. Goyer and Uriel Caton, published by DC Comics.
