= Dope Girls =

2025 British historical drama television series

- Genre: Historical drama
- Created by: Polly Stenham; Alex Warren
- Based on: Dope Girls: The Birth of the British Drug Underground by Marek Kohn
- Written by: Polly Stenham; Alex Warren; Matthew Jacobs Horgan; Amelia Spencer; Roanne Bardsley; Elinor Cook
- Directed by: Shannon Murphy; Miranda Bowen
- Starring: Julianne Nicholson; Eliza Scanlen; Umi Myers; Eilidh Fisher; Geraldine James
- Composer: NYX
- Country of origin: United Kingdom
- Original language: English
- No. of series: 1
- No. of episodes: 6

Production
- Executive producers: Kate Crowther; Jane Tranter; Polly Stenham; Alex Warren; Shannon Murphy; Michael Lesslie
- Producers: Stephen Haren; Ado Yoshizaki Cassuto
- Cinematography: Annika Summerson; Carlos Catalán
- Editors: Stephen Evans; Sara Jones; Jo Smyth; Rebecca Trotman
- Running time: 53–58 minutes
- Production companies: Bad Wolf; Sony Pictures Television

Original release
- Network: BBC One
- Release: 22 February – 29 March 2025

Dope Girls is a six-part historical drama television series based on the nonfiction book Dope Girls: The Birth of the British Drug Underground (1992) by Marek Kohn, developed by Bad Wolf in association with Sony Pictures Television for BBC One. The series was broadcast on BBC One from 22 February to 29 March 2025.

== Premise ==
Set in early 20th-century Soho, the characters and events in the series are based on the lives of Kate Meyrick, Billie Carleton and Edgar Manning.

== Cast and characters ==
- Julianne Nicholson as Kate Galloway
- Eliza Scanlen as Violet Davies
- Umi Myers as Billie Cassidy
- Eilidh Fisher as Evie Galloway
- Sebastian Croft as Silvio Salucci
- Geraldine James as Isabella Salucci
- Rory Fleck Byrne as Luca Salucci
- Dustin Demri-Burns as Damaso Salucci
- Eben Figueiredo as Matteo Rossi Salucci
- Michael Duke as Eddie Cobb
- Ian Bonar as Sgt Frank Turner
- Nabhaan Rizwan as Silas Huxley
- Priya Kansara as Lily Lee
- Jordan Kouamé as Reggie Regbo
- Will Keen as Frederick Asquith-Gore
- Fiona Button as Sophie Asquith-Gore
- Carlos Powell
- Harry Cadby as Jimmy Conville

== Episodes ==
No. overall	No. in season	Title	Directed by	Written by	Original release date	U.K. viewers (millions)
1	1	"When She Was Bad, She Was Very Very Bad"	Shannon Murphy	Polly Stenham; Alex Warren	22 February 2025	N/A
2	2	"Butter Wouldn't Melt"	Shannon Murphy	Polly Stenham; Alex Warren	1 March 2025	N/A
3	3	"A Filthy Little Mole Down a Filthy Little Hole"	Shannon Murphy	Polly Stenham; Alex Warren; Matthew Jacobs Horgan	8 March 2025	N/A
4	4	"Behold the Stars"	Miranda Bowen	Amelia Spencer	15 March 2025	N/A
5	5	"Monster"	Miranda Bowen	Roanne Bardsley	22 March 2025	N/A
6	6	"Rage"	Miranda Bowen	Polly Stenham; Alex Warren; Elinor Cook	29 March 2025	N/A

== Production ==
In March 2023, it was announced the BBC had ordered Dope Girls from Bad Wolf, which the network described as a "spiritual successor" to Peaky Blinders (2013–2022).

Based on Marek Kohn's 1992 non-fiction book, the six-part series is written by Polly Stenham and Alex Warren, with Xiao Tang and Matthew Jacobs Morgan joining them in the writing room. Stenham and Warren executive produce the series with Kate Crowther and Jane Tranter of Bad Wolf, as well as Michael Lesslie.

In November 2023, Julianne Nicholson and Eliza Scanlen joined the cast in lead roles with Umi Myers, Eilidh Fisher, Geraldine James and Sebastian Croft also cast. Deadline Hollywood confirmed filming started in late 2023.

In July 2025, the series was cancelled after one season.

== Release ==
The series was broadcast in the United Kingdom on BBC One from 22 February 2025.

== Reception ==
The review aggregator website Rotten Tomatoes reported a 90% approval rating based on 10 critic reviews.

Barbara Ellen for The Guardian described the atmosphere of the show as "left-field, dreamlike, female-centric, wild. Dope Girls can be overblown and messy, but it’s also passionate and promising", but also said that the series "is scuppered repeatedly by grating production flourishes (scribblings on the screen, and the like) and overcooked symbolism".

Anita Singh in The Daily Telegraph awarded the show three stars and noted that it is "trying very hard not to be a stuffy period drama. Too hard, at times.”
