= Radu Andrei Micu =

Romania actor (born 1982)

- Born: 18 July 1982 (age 43); Iași, Romania
- Occupation: Actor
- Years active: 2004–present

Radu Andrei Micu (born 18 July 1982, Iași) is a Romanian actor.

== Early life ==
Radu Andrei Micu was born on 18 July 1982 in Iași, Romania, into a family with German, Russian and Romanian roots. In 2005, he graduated from the I. L. Caragiale National University of Theatre and Film.

== Career ==
In 2022, he portrayed Dimitrie (right hand of Vlad the Impaler) in the Netflix original docudrama Rise of Empires: Ottoman. That same year, he co-starred with Frida Gustavsson, Stuart Martin and David Morrissey in Italian movie Dampyr.

== Filmography ==
=== Film ===
Year	Title	Role
2004	Madhouse	Royce
2005	BloodRayne	Sleepy Young Man
2007	Catacombs	Nico
2013	The Zero Theorem	Sex Shop Owner
2013	Dead in Tombstone	Washington
2016	Illegitimate	Radu
2016	End of a Gun	Hotel Manager
2016	Contract to Kill	Cabbie
2017	The Crucifixion	Deacon
2022	Dampyr	Lazar

=== Television ===
Year(s)	Title	Role	Notes
2017	The Saint	Tech 2	TV Movie
2017	A Christmas Prince	Ian	TV Movie
2020	Washington	Nathanael Greene	Episode: "Rebel Commander"
2022	Rise of Empires: Ottoman	Dimitrie	6 episodes
