= Freedom of the Seas =

Freedom of the Seas may refer to:

- Freedom of the seas, a legal concept
- Mare Liberum (The Free Sea or The Freedom of the Sea), a book in Latin on international law written by Hugo Grotius
- The Freedom of the Seas (play), 1918 play by Walter Hackett
- Freedom of the Seas (film), a 1934 film based on the play directed by Marcel Varnel
- MS Freedom of the Seas, a cruise ship
