= Reginald de Veulle =

Raoul Reginald "Reggie" de Veulle (c. 1881–1956), was a British actor and fashion costumier. He was the son of a former British vice-consul at Le Mans and was born there, but raised in Jersey. He attended the Kensington School of Art and though he acted in a few West End shows, moved into fashion design.

He is associated with the death of the actress Billie Carleton in 1918, and was convicted of supplying drugs to her, but was acquitted of her manslaughter.

== Early life ==
While an actor in London, de Veulle became involved in a 1911 blackmail trial involving William Cronshaw and John and Rose Powers. The Powers were prosecuted for trying to blackmail Cronshaw by threatening to tell his relatives and directors of his Manchester firm about his relationship with their son, Frederick Powers. It transpired during the court case that Cronshaw had met Frederick Powers through de Veulle, and that he had also given de Veulle large sums of cash. Rose Powers was later acquitted of the blackmail charge.

Via the case notes it appears de Veulle had been travelling and working in America, and while in New York it is said he first developed his cocaine habit. He then arrived in Paris and became a ladies dress designer.

With the outbreak of war in 1914, de Veulle travelled back to London and worked for a Mayfair theatrical costumier. In 1915 he met the actress Billie Carleton when she modelled his creations at Miss Phelps of Albemarle Street. He also supplied her with drugs, mainly sourced from a Scottish woman, Ada Lau Ping, and her husband Yu Lau Ping, who lived in Limehouse causeway, east London.

In 1916, de Veulle married a Parisian woman, Pauline Gay, (1876–1941) who was a seamstress and dress designer.

== Billie Carleton ==
Carleton was becoming something of a star of the stage during the war. De Veulle bought drugs from the Lau Ping's and the actor Lionel Belcher, and supplied his friends and associates. de Veulle also hosted orgies at his Mayfair flat where cocaine and opium (cooked up by Ada Lau Ping) were freely available. These parties were attended by Billie Carleton, Belcher and others.

Though called up for active service in September 1918, de Veulle's drug addictions led him to be declared unfit for duty. In late November 1918, shortly after the Armistice, a Victory Ball was held at the Royal Albert Hall. Carleton wore a dress designed by de Veulle for the occasion, he himself attended in a tight-fitting harlequin's outfit. Carleton retired with friends to her apartment at the Savoy Court Mansions (an annexe of the Savoy Hotel). She was found dead by her maid the following afternoon.

== Court cases ==
At the inquest into Billie Carleton's death the coroner gave clear directions to the jury regarding de Veulle's guilt in supplying the cocaine that caused her death. Malvina Longfellow was a witness at the inquest and testified about Carleton's addiction. However, it took the jury barely 15 minutes to find de Veulle guilty of manslaughter, and he was taken into custody.

When de Veulle's case came to trial, even though the judge gave the jury clear directions to find De Veulle guilty of manslaughter, after 50 minutes of deliberations the jury acquitted him on 4 April. On 7 April, he pleaded guilty to conspiracy (along with Ada Lau Ping) to procure cocaine and was sentenced to eight months without hard labour.

Ada Lau Ping was charged with supplying cocaine and was sentenced to five months with hard labour. She died shortly after release in 1920, aged 29, from tuberculosis. Her Chinese husband, Lau Ping You, was charged with possession and received a lenient £10 fine.

== Post trial life ==
De Veulle is recorded as the costume designer for the May 1926 stage musical Yvonne. De Veulle's designs for the dresses are in the Emile Littler Archive in the V & A Museum, London. In 1933 the Obelisk Press in Paris promised it would soon be releasing '... a book of formidable revelations' by de Veulle, though it was not published.

Raoul R. de Veulle died in Islington, London, in 1956.

== See also ==
- Brilliant Chang
