= Dampyr (film) =

2022 Italian action horror fantasy film

- Italian theatrical release poster
- Directed by: Riccardo Chemello
- Screenplay by: Mauro Boselli; Giovanni Masi; Alberto Ostini; Mauro Uzzeo
- Story by: Mauro Boselli; Maurizio Colombo
- Based on: Dampyr by: Mauro Boselli; Maurizio Colombo
- Produced by: Roberto Proia; Vincenzo Sarno; Andrea Sgaravatti
- Starring: Wade Briggs; Stuart Martin; Frida Gustavsson; Sebastian Croft; Luke Roberts; David Morrissey
- Cinematography: Vittorio Omodei Zorini
- Edited by: Julien Panzarasa
- Music by: Lorenzo Tomio
- Production companies: Sergio Bonelli Editore; Eagle Pictures; Brandon Box
- Distributed by: Eagle Pictures (Italy); Sony Pictures Releasing (International)
- Release date: 28 October 2022
- Country: Italy
- Language: English
- Budget: $15 million

Dampyr is a 2022 English-language Italian fantasy action horror film directed by Riccardo Chemello. It stars Wade Briggs, Stuart Martin, Frida Gustavsson, and David Morrissey in the lead roles. The film is based on the comic series Dampyr, which was co-written by Mauro Boselli and Maurizio Colombo, and published by Sergio Bonelli Editore.

It is the first installment of the Bonelli Cinematic Universe (BCU), a shared universe between movie and television projects by Bonelli Entertainment, division of Sergio Bonelli Editore.

== Plot ==
The woman goes into labor, giving birth to a baby named Dampyr aided by three nurses, but she dies of birth complications. The nurses, revealed to be witches, hold back an approaching knight using their magical barrier. The knight is revealed to be the baby's father and he demands to see his son, but the nurses refuse.

In 1992, during the Bosnian War, soldiers led by commander Emil Kurjak are sent to the town of Yorvolak, where they find the whole town has been massacred. A terrified elderly survivor warns them that they must call the Dampyr, before being shot by Kurjak's callous soldier, Stefan. After Kurjak's soldiers were attacked by the vampires, Lazar and Dejan bring the Dampyr to Yorvolak. The Dampyr – revealed to be Harlan Draka, an alcoholic con artist who performs fake exorcisms and is plagued with his recurring nightmares – was reticent about his past as a vampire hunter and denies their existence but was nonetheless forcefully sent out into the streets by Kurjak to act as their bait. Harlan was ambushed by the vampires as they attack the town, but Harlan's blood easily kills them, forcing the vampires to retreat.

Stefan – upset at the prospect of having to fight against vampires – rebel against Kurjak and locks him up inside the church alongside Harlan, and a lone vampire survivor, Tesla Dubcek, save for Harlan's manager and assistant Yuri, who he was reluctantly sent away to Stefan to keep him safe. Confined inside the church, Tesla reveals that she serves but hates Gorka, a Master of the Night—a much more powerful vampire who can create vampires with his bite and resist sunlight. She explains that Harlan is a true Dampyr, the son of the Master of the Night, whose wife that had died of childbirth was a human and warns that Gorka, who sees him as dangerous, will do anything to exterminate him. Harlan senses Gorka's presence, who attacks the soldiers and capture Yuri. Harlan demands her to take him to Gorka. Tesla, who was told by Gorka to observe Harlan, agrees.

Tesla takes the duo to a war-torn Sarajevo where Gorka hides in an old library. Along the way, the two dispatches Kurjak's transformed soldiers, including Lazar and Dejan, using bullets covered in Harlan's blood. However, Gorka telepathically controls Tesla, forcing her to shoot Harlan. After recuperating themselves for the night, Harlan and Kurjak enter Gorka's hideout. Kurjak succumbs to his hallucinations of his deceased son Mikolos, and was taken captive along with Tesla, who Gorka had her captured for interfering with the vampires from feeding a young woman. A vampiric Stefan tortures Tesla and Kurjak, and in response, as they break free from their restraints, Kurjak torched Stefan to death.

Harlan confronts Gorka, and faces against the now vampiric Yuri, but he kills himself by coming into contact with the friend's blood. Harlan was nearly overpowered by Gorka, but upon hearing the voice from a dark knight telling him to believe in his own blood, he develops new powers that allow him to resist Gorka's abilities and kills him by strangling him with his blood-stained hands.

With Gorka's death, the three enter a room with a book containing the faces of several Masters of the Night, including Draka, Harlan's father, realizing that their war against the vampires is just beginning. In the pre-credits scene, Draka visits the grave of Harlan's birth mother, Velma. He is then visited by the three witches, who tell him that the Dampyr has made his choice. However, Draka warns that his son will soon be consumed by their thirst for blood.

== Cast ==
- Wade Briggs as Harlan Draka / Dampyr
  - Oliver Lepadatu as young Harlan
- Stuart Martin as Emil Kurjak
- Frida Gustavsson as Tesla Dubcek
- Sebastian Croft as Yuri
- Luke Roberts as Draka
- David Morrissey as Gorka
- Radu Andrei Micu as Lazar
- Ionut Grama as Stefan
- Florin Fratila as Dejan
- Madalina Bellariu Ion as Velma

== Production ==
A film adaptation of Dampyr was announced by Sergio Bonelli Editore at 2018 Lucca Comics & Games. Directed by Riccardo Chemello and produced by Bonelli, Eagle Pictures and Brandon Box, filming started in Romania in October 2019. On 1 November 2019, the cast was revealed, with Wade Briggs as Harlan "Dampyr" Draka, the titular character, Stuart Martin and Frida Gustavsson as Dampyr's allies Emil Kurjak and Tesla Dubcek, David Morrissey as the antagonist Gorka, Sebastian Croft as Yuri and Luke Roberts as Draka, Harlan's father.

== Release ==
The film was theatrically released in Italy on 28 October 2022.

The movie was later released in the United States on 8 August 2023 by Sony Pictures Home Entertainment on PVOD, and on 23 November 2023 on Netflix.

== Accolades ==
Dampyr was nominated for an award at the 68th David di Donatello Awards for Best Visual Effects VFX.

Awards and nominations received by Dampyr
Award	Category	Nominee	Result
68th David di Donatello	Best Visual Effects VFX	Alessio Bertotti and Filippo Robino	Nominated

== See also ==
- List of Italian films of 2022
