= Dampyr =

Italian comic book series

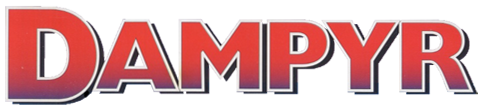
- Logo of the series

Publication information
- Publisher: Sergio Bonelli Editore
- Format: Ongoing series
- Genre: Horror
- Publication date: April 2000 – present
- No. of issues: 288
- Main character(s): Harlan Draka "Dampyr"; Emil Kurjak; Tesla Dubcek

Creative team
- Created by: Mauro Boselli; Maurizio Colombo
- Written by: List: Mauro Boselli Maurizio Colombo Diego Cajelli Luigi Mignacco Alberto Ostini Pasquale Ruju Giovanni Di Gregorio Alessandro Bilotta
- Artist: List: Enea Riboldi (cover artist) Majo Maurizio Dotti Nicola Genzianella Alessandro Baggi Stefano Andreucci Corrado Roi Stefano Casini

Dampyr is an Italian comic book series created by Mauro Boselli and Maurizio Colombo and first published by Sergio Bonelli Editore in 2000.

== Characters ==
- Harlan Draka, also known as "Dampyr", is a Serbian vampire hunter revealed to be a dhampir, son of the Master of the Night Draka.
- Emil Kurjak, a Bosnian soldier and mercenary during the Yugoslav Wars, becomes Harlan's friend and trusted ally.
- Tesla Dubcek, a German girl turned into a vampire, decides to join Harlan in his fight against the Masters of the Night.
- Caleb Lost, human incarnation of the angel Camael, lives in Prague as a special agent against the Masters of the Night.
- Draka, Harlan's father and powerful Master of the Night.
- Nergal, main antagonist and chief of the Secret Police of Hell.

== Publication history ==
The first issue of Dampyr, titled Il figlio del diavolo ("Devil's Son"), was published in Italy by Sergio Bonelli Editore on 14 April 2000.

The series has been published in Serbia by Veseli Četvrtak and occasionally in other territories including Turkey (Oglak), Greece (Jemma Press), Slovenia (Grafart), Finland (Artic Banana), Croatia (Strip Agent), France (Clair de Lune), Germany (Kult Editionen), Spain (Aleta Ediciones) and Brazil (Mythos, Editora 85).

A selection of eight issues was released in the United States by IDW Publishing in 2005.

== Adaptations ==
A feature film adaptation was announced by Sergio Bonelli Editore at 2018 Lucca Comics & Games, as the first installment of the "Bonelli Cinematic Universe". It was directed by Riccardo Chemello and produced by Bonelli, Eagle Pictures and Brandon Box. Filming started in Romania in October 2019. On 1 November 2019 the cast has been revealed, with Wade Briggs as Harlan "Dampyr" Draka, the titular character. Other cast members include Stuart Martin and Frida Gustavsson as Dampyr's allies Emil Kurjak and Tesla Dubcek, David Morrissey as the antagonist Gorka, Sebastian Croft as Yuri and Luke Roberts as Draka, Harlan's father.

On September 21, 2022 the poster and trailer for the movie were released, announcing October 28, 2022 as the release date in Italy.
