= H. R. Oswald =

English coroner

H.R. Oswald
- Born: Henry Robert Oswald; 8 February 1852; Trichnopoly, Madras Presidency
- Died: 1940; Salisbury, Wiltshire, England
- Occupations: Medical Doctor and Barrister of Law
- Known for: Coroner of London

Henry Robert Oswald M.D., M.B., C.M., (8 February 1852 – 1940) was a British barrister and coroner. He was president of the Coroners' Society of England and Wales.

== Early life ==
Oswald was born on 8 February 1852 in Trichnopoly, Madras, India, the son of Surgeon General H.R. Oswald who was serving in the Indian Army. He was privately educated in the Isle of Man and later Edgbaston, Birmingham, before moving on to the Royal High School, Edinburgh. Oswald originally intended to enter the Indian Civil Service but changed his mind and studied medicine at the University of Edinburgh. He then went into practice as a medical doctor, achieving his MD from the University of Edinburgh in 1881. Then, in 1890 he entered the Middle Temple to train as a barrister, being called to the bar in 1894.

== Coroner ==
Oswald became the deputy-coroner in the Central and Western districts of London, and later in the South-Western and Kingston districts. In 1902 he became the coroner for the South-Eastern district. He moved to the Western district in 1919, a post he held until he retired in 1930.

Oswald presided over between 20,000 and 30,000 inquests. Among the notable ones were the first inquest about death from a motor car (1904), a case involving Ronald True, the death of Freda Kempton from a drug overdose in which the dealer Brilliant Chang was implicated (1922), and deaths caused by the 1928 Thames flood of London.

His reminiscences were published in 1936 by Stanley Paul as Memoirs of a London County Coroner.

== Family life ==
Oswald married twice, firstly to Jean Moir-Byres with whom he had a daughter. Jean died in 1907. He married again in 1908 to Ethel Mary Cundell. Oswald died in early 1940 in the Salisbury district of Wiltshire.
