= Eilidh Fisher =

Scottish actress

- Education: American Academy of Dramatic Arts
- Occupation: Actress
- Years active: 2019-

Eilidh Fisher is a Scottish film and television actress.

== Early life ==
From the Scottish island of Stronsay in the Orkney Islands where her mother was a doctor. Her father, also a doctor resides in Yorkshire. She studied Kirkwall Grammar School and at the American Academy of Dramatic Arts in Los Angeles, and also lived in London.

== Career ==
In 2019 she featured in the long-running BBC One series Call the Midwife. In 2020, she could be seen in Netflix historical miniseries The English Game, about the origins of association football in Victorian England.

Her film roles have included appearing in Christopher Smith horror film Consecration alongside Jena Malone in 2023. In 2024, she appeared alongside Saoirse Ronan in The Outrun film. This role had a special appeal to her as she had read and loved the book as a teenager.

She also had a role in dystopian television series The Power and has a lead role in British female-led crime drama Dope Girls for BBC One (2025).

== Filmography ==
| Year | Title | Role | Notes |
|---|---|---|---|
| 2019 | Farmland | Clementine | Short |
| 2019 | Call the Midwife | Effie Tolmie | 1 episode |
| 2020 | The English Game | Moira Suter | 2 episodes |
| 2020 | The Nest | Claire | 1 episode |
| 2023 | Consecration | Sister Meg | Feature film |
| 2023 | The Power | Bailey | 2 episodes |
| 2024 | The Outrun | Evie | Feature film |
| 2025 | Dope Girls | Evie Galloway | Lead role |
| 2026 | Alice and Steve | Rome | 6 episodes |
