= Dröm =

Swedish television series

Dröm is a Swedish TV series from 2019 aimed primarily at young people. Amir Chamdin directs all of season one, and is the conceptual director for season two. All eight episodes in season two are directed by Kirke Ailio Rodwell. Johan Rudolphie is responsible for the idea and framework.

== Plot ==
The series is about thirteen-year-old Thea (played by Ylvali Rurling in childhood and by Swedish super-model Frida Gustavsson in adulthood), who moves to a new city with her mother. First showing was in the autumn of 2019, the second in the spring of 2021. Ylvali Rurling talked about the series and her role in it in an interview by Nora Fernstedt, published on August, 16, 2019.

== Action ==
Newly moved in, Thea begins to dream intensely when a mysterious blue shimmering stone suddenly crashes into the bedroom. After a couple of days, she learns that more people have the same type of stone, and that they dream of their own future. Through the dreams, she and her friends learn in advance about bad things that are about to happen. They can prevent a serious accident, but also receive information about what they believe is another one, which will be significantly more difficult to avoid.
