= Umi Myers =

English actress

- Education: Guildhall School of Music and Drama
- Occupation: Actress
- Years active: 2020–present

Umi Myers is a British stage, television and film actress.

== Career ==
Whilst a student at the Guildhall School of Music and Drama she appeared with her final-year acting student peers in a full-scale performance of Pod available to be live-streamed during the Coronavirus pandemic lockdown in 2020. She graduated in 2021, and made her television debut on long-running BBC One crime drama Silent Witness. On stage, she appeared in the original production of Hilary Mantel's The Mirror and the Light at the Gielgud Theatre in London in 2021 for the Royal Shakespeare Company.

In 2024, she could be seen portraying musician and beauty queen Cindy Breakspeare in musical biopic Bob Marley: One Love. That year, she began filming Māori Gothic horror Mārama, alongside Toby Stephens and Ariāna Osborne in New Zealand.

She had a lead role as Billie Cassidy in BBC One historical drama series Dope Girls.

== Filmography ==
Year	Title	Role	Notes
2023	Silent Witness	Emma Pryor	Series 26; episode 8: "Hearts of Darkness: Part 2"
2024	Bob Marley: One Love	Cindy Breakspeare	Feature film
2024	Truth Serum	Sandy	Short film
2024	Get Millie Black	Natalie Danvers	Episode 5: "Curtis"
2025	Dope Girls	Billie Cassidy	Episodes 1–6
2025	Mārama	Peggy	Feature film
TBA	Bare	TBA	Filming
