= Billie Carleton =

British actor and singer

- Carleton in The Freedom of the Seas, 1918
- Born: Florence Leonora Stewart; 4 September 1896; Bloomsbury, London, England
- Died: 28 November 1918 (aged 22); London, England
- Known for: Acting

Billie Carleton (4 September 1896 – 28 November 1918) was an English musical comedy actress during the First World War. She began her professional stage career at age 15 and was playing roles in the West End by age 18. She appeared in the hit musical The Boy (1917), which led to a starring role in The Freedom of the Seas in 1918. At the age of 22, she was found dead, apparently of a drug overdose.

== Life and career ==
Born Florence Leonora Stewart in Bloomsbury, London, daughter of a chorus singer named Margaret Stewart and an unknown father, Carleton was raised by her aunt, Catherine Joliffe. Carleton left home at 15 to work on the stage and received her first break when the impresario C.B. Cochran promoted her from the chorus to a role in his 1914 revue Watch Your Step. According to Cochran, despite having a weak voice, Carleton had a good stage presence, and her delicate beauty charmed the audience. When he was informed during the run of the show that Carleton was attending opium parties, Cochran fired her. He gave her another chance in 1917, when she took over the leading role from Gertie Millar in his show Houp La! She made little impression in the part, which she took on only a week before the show closed.

Carleton soon appeared for André Charlot in another revue Some More Samples! Although the critics again noted her weak voice, she had better success in this, and was engaged for the part of Joy Chatterton, a flapper in the hit musical farce The Boy when it opened at the Adelphi Theatre in August 1917. In May 1918, she appeared in Fair and Warmer, this time playing a maid to Fay Compton's flapper. Then in August, she took the starring role of Phyllis Harcourt in The Freedom of the Seas at the Haymarket Theatre, briefly becoming the youngest leading lady in the West End.

== Death and scandal ==
On 27 November 1918, she left the theatre after performing and, wearing a daringly diaphanous outfit designed by her friend Reggie de Veulle, attended the Victory Ball at the Royal Albert Hall. It was one of many such events held to commemorate the end of the war earlier in the month, but being under the patronage of a large number of aristocratic ladies, it was a particularly long and splendid affair, lasting into the small hours. The next day Carleton's maid found her dead in bed in her Savoy Hotel suite, apparently killed by an overdose of cocaine.

A coroner's inquest found that Carleton had died of a cocaine overdose "supplied to her by Reginald de Veulle in a culpable and negligent manner". De Veulle was charged with manslaughter and conspiracy to supply a prohibited drug under Regulation 40b of the Defence of the Realm Act 1914, which had been passed in 1916 and made possession of both cocaine and opium illegal for the first time in Britain. The trial was held before Mr Justice Salter, with Sir Richard Muir for the prosecution. De Veulle was acquitted of the first charge but pleaded guilty to the second, and was sentenced to eight months in prison.

Reports of the trial exposed details of Carleton's private life and those of her friends, particularly de Veulle, who previously had been involved in a homosexual blackmail case and had dressed in women's clothes. Although the milieu in which she moved was stigmatised as immoral and sordid, and although she had been the kept mistress of a man twenty years her senior, Carleton was seen largely as an innocent victim.

Ada Song Ping You was a Scotswoman who had married a Chinese man (Song Ping You) from whom she learned to use opium. After Carleton's death, You was sentenced to five months in jail with hard labour for preparing opium for smoking and supplying it to Carleton. The author Marek Kohn, however, argues that Carleton did not die from cocaine but from legal depressants taken to deal with her cocaine hangover.

== In art and literature ==
Noël Coward, who had known both Carleton and de Veulle, acknowledged her story as a source for his first successful play, The Vortex. In Sax Rohmer's novel Dope, the main character, Rita Dresden, is based on Carleton.

== See also ==
- Brilliant Chang
