= Bare (upcoming film) =

- Directed by: Lorna Tucker
- Screenplay by: Lorna Tucker
- Based on: Bare by Lorna Tucker
- Produced by: Gillian Berrie; Savannah Power; Marcus Warren; Christian Moore
- Starring: Florence Hunt; Isla Fisher; Colin Firth; Ruaridh Mollica; Séamus McLean Ross; Mirren Mack; Lewis Gribben; Tut Nyuot; Clay Milner Russell; Umi Myers
- Cinematography: Seamus McGarvey
- Production company: Consortium Pictures
- Countries: United States; Monaco
- Language: English

Bare is an upcoming drama film written and directed by Lorna Tucker, and based on the book of the same name by Tucker.

== Cast ==
- Florence Hunt as Sophie
- Isla Fisher
- Colin Firth
- Ruaridh Mollica
- Séamus McLean Ross
- Mirren Mack
- Lewis Gribben
- Tut Nyuot
- Clay Milner Russell
- Umi Myers
- Sky Frances
- Shane Walker
- Nicholas Pinnock
- Fatboy Slim

== Production ==
In April 2026, principal photography began in London, on a drama film by filmmaker Lorna Tucker that was based on the book of the same name by Tucker. Florence Hunt, Isla Fisher, Colin Firth, Ruaridh Mollica, Séamus McLean Ross, Mirren Mack, Lewis Gribben, Tut Nyuot, Clay Milner Russell, Umi Myers, Sky Frances, Shane Walker, and Fatboy Slim joined the cast. In May, Nicholas Pinnock joined the cast, Seamus McGarvey was revealed as the cinematographer, Amanda McArthur as he production designer, and Jessica Schofield as the costume designer.
