= Babylon (TV series) =

British comedy-drama TV series

- Genre: Comedy drama
- Created by: Danny Boyle; Robert Jones; Jesse Armstrong; Sam Bain
- Written by: Sam Bain; Jesse Armstrong; Jon Brown
- Directed by: Danny Boyle; Sally El Hosaini; Jon S. Baird
- Starring: Brit Marling; James Nesbitt; Bertie Carvel; Paterson Joseph; Nicola Walker; Ella Smith; Daniel Kaluuya; Jonny Sweet; Adam Deacon; Jill Halfpenny; Cavan Clerkin; Andrew Brooke; Stuart Martin; Nick Blood
- Composers: Rick Smith (Main theme and pilot); Stuart Earl (series 1)
- Country of origin: United Kingdom
- Original language: English
- No. of series: 1
- No. of episodes: 7

Production
- Executive producers: Robert Jones; Jesse Armstrong; Sam Bain; Danny Boyle
- Producers: Robert Jones; Derrin Schlesinger
- Editors: Jon Harris; Mark Davies; Iain Kitching
- Running time: 90 minutes (pilot); 60 minutes (series)
- Production company: Nightjack Ltd.

Original release
- Network: Channel 4
- Release: 9 February – 18 December 2014

Babylon is a British comedy-drama television series co-created by Danny Boyle, Robert Jones, Jesse Armstrong and Sam Bain for Channel 4, and produced by Nightjack Ltd.

The series is set in London, and follows various characters working for the Metropolitan Police Service, police officers on the streets, who are responding to incidents, as well as the top management and PR department at New Scotland Yard, who try to counter any backlash from such incidents.

== Plot ==
The series follows the new Director of Communications, the American Liz Garvey (Brit Marling), who has been headhunted by the Police Commissioner Richard Miller (James Nesbitt) to drag the force into the new media age, and her conflicts with her own department and legal bureaucracy. This is intercut with the happenings within a team in the Territorial Support Group and a team of authorised firearms officers in the Specialist Firearms Command.

== Cast ==
- Brit Marling as Liz Garvey, Director of Communications
- James Nesbitt as Sir Richard Miller, Commissioner
- Bertie Carvel as Finn Kirkwood, Communications Deputy
- Ella Smith as Mia Conroy, Communications staff member
- Paterson Joseph as Charles Inglis, Assistant Commissioner, later Commissioner
- Jonny Sweet as Tom Oliver, Superintendent and Personal Aide to the Commissioner
- Nicola Walker as Sharon Franklin, Assistant Commissioner
- Jill Halfpenny as PC Davina Bancroft, TSG officer, married to SCO19 officer Banjo
- Cavan Clerkin as PC Damien "Clarkey" Clarke, TSG officer
- Owain Arthur as PC Paul "Nobbo" Norrington, TSG officer
- Adam Deacon as PC Robbie Vas, TSG officer who moves over to SCO19
- Andrew Brooke as PC Neil "Banjo" Bancroft, SCO19 officer, married to TSG officer Davina
- Stuart Martin as PC Tony Forbes, SCO19 officer
- Nick Blood as PC Warwick Collister, SCO19 officer
- Daniel Kaluuya as Matt Coward, documentary film maker
- Ralph Brown as Grant Delgado, Deputy Mayor of London

== Production ==
Channel 4 originally announced that Babylon had been commissioned for Autumn 2014 on 23 December 2013. They further announced the six-part series had begun filming, in Liverpool and London on 17 April 2014.

Danny Boyle directed the pilot episode, while Jon S. Baird directed the first three episodes of Series 1 with Sally El Hosaini directing the last three.

Episode two was partly filmed at the Metropolitan Police Training Ground in Gravesend, Kent and features in the scenes where Robbie (Adam Deacon) trains at the firing range. Episode six, the series finale, recreated the London Riots of 2011.

In a 2015 interview with Radio Times magazine, Sam Bain stated that it was unlikely Babylon would return for a further series, with Jesse Armstrong explaining that "getting everyone back together seemed like it would be extraordinarily complicated, so we haven't pursued it".

== Episodes ==
=== Pilot (2014) ===
Total no.	No. in series	Title	Directed by	Written by	Original release date	UK viewers (millions)
1	-	"Pilot"	Danny Boyle	Sam Bain; Jesse Armstrong	9 February 2014	1.99
A sniper is on the prowl, assassinating random people in London, including a Police Community Support Officer. It's a hectic first day for new Director of Communications, Liz Garvey.

=== Series 1 (2015) ===
Total no.	No. in series	Title	Directed by	Written by	UK Original air date	UK viewers (millions)	US Original air date	US viewers (millions)
2	1	"Episode One"	Jon S. Baird	Jesse Armstrong	13 November 2014	1.05	8 January 2015	0.091
The Territorial Support Group (TSG) is dispatched to a riot held by the Youth Offenders Institution. Robbie hopes for a last quiet day in the field before firearms training. Police documentary director Matt may have noticed dangerous communications within the police ranks. The police release footage of AFO Warwick's shooting, involving an unarmed suspect, leaving Warwick with anxiety. Due to the footage, Warwick's AFO colleagues Tony and Banjo think of a plan to relieve his anxiety of the situation. Meanwhile a PR plan direct from Scotland Yard hits turmoil, tensions arise between Police Commissioner Miller and Deputy Mayor Grant Delgado.
3	2	"Episode Two"	Jon S. Baird	Jon Brown	20 November 2014	Under 1.06	15 January 2015	0.063
Director of Communications Liz Garvey introduces her creation of 'Metwork', a brand new news channel for the use of the force and Liz's PR/Communication department. Liz continues to receive backlash from her deputy, Finn, who is determined to stop the 'Metwork' from going ahead. AFO Warwick's mental state is desperately deteriorating whilst on duty, and AFO trainee Robbie plans to improve his attitude towards the job in hand.
4	3	"Episode Three"	Jon S. Baird	Sam Bain	27 November 2014	Under 0.92	22 January 2015	0.061
Richard is asked to oversee an operation into a possible bomb threat on a Money expo at the Thameside centre, but continuing problems in his personal life begin to cloud his judgement. A robot is sent in to inspect a suspicious package that has been left in a coffee bar, and when the package is found to be harmless, the operation is scaled down. However, minutes after leaving the scene, a bomb explodes resulting in a small number of casualties. With a high-flying journalist breathing down Richard's neck over his extra-marital affairs, the situation soon becomes too much to bear, and whilst dealing with the ensuing fall-out from the explosion, Liz ignores a call from Richard.
5	4	"Episode Four"	Sally El Hosaini	Sam Bain	4 December 2014	Under 0.93	29 January 2015	0.017
The search for the Thameside bomber gets underway, while the fall-out from Richard's death is felt throughout the department. Finn seizes his chance to try and extradite Liz, while Inglis shines in a moment of glory having been made acting commissioner. Clarkey and Davina's personal life gets in the way during the search for the bomber and they fail to search the house where the bomber is living. Luckily, Sharon is able to defuse the situation, which gives Liz an idea. Meanwhile, whilst continuing to cover up Warwick's absence, Robbie gets a little too gung-ho with an old friend from school, but when the unit are called to a possible firearms incident outside a nightclub, Warwick hesitates.
6	5	"Episode Five"	Sally El Hosaini	Jon Brown	11 December 2014	Under 0.86	5 February 2015	0.073
The fall-out from the teen shooting sees Banjo, Tony, Warwick and Robbie being interviewed by an inquest panel over their involvement, and it's not long before Banjo is forced to dish the dirt on Warwick's recent troubles. A troubled Robbie admits to Matt that he faked the crime scene by placing the gun in the boy's hand, unaware that Matt has recorded him on video. Meanwhile, Finn continues to make things difficult for Liz, but when a search for a missing boy gets underway, Liz uses the opportunity to highlight Sharon's adept qualities at making commissioner, fully aware that Sharon being appointed commissioner would get Finn off her back, and eliminate Inglis at the same time.
7	6	"Episode Six"	Sally El Hosaini	Jesse Armstrong	18 December 2014	Under 0.92	12 February 2015	0.055
Footage of Banjo trashing a wheelie bin goes viral. Sharon's proposals of turning PCSO's into actual police officers results in unauthorised strike action across the two police units. Robbie, Tony and Banjo perform an off-the-record raid on Matt's flat to retrieve the evidence of Robbie's confession, but Tony has a crisis of conscience and offers the footage up to Liz. Word spreads of the TSG and ARV's unsanctioned strike action, resulting in widespread rioting and looting across London. Banjo fails to keep his cool and attacks Clarkey. Meanwhile, when word spreads of Sharon's policy for 'cops to arrest cops' leaks out, Liz decides it's time to back a new horse and pulls out all of the strings for Inglis' bid to become commissioner.

== Reception ==
Review aggregator Rotten Tomatoes gave the show a 74% "fresh" rating with an average rating of 7.2/10 based on 19 reviews. The critical consensus states: "Babylon successfully combines two genres into one show, adding great actors and timely subject matter to stealthy wit and hard-hitting drama." Metacritic, which uses a weighted average, assigned a score of 67 out of 100, based on 14 critics, indicating "generally favorable reviews".

== International broadcast ==
Babylon premiered on SundanceTV in the United States on 8 January 2015. In Australia, the series premiered on 28 September 2015 on BBC First.
