= Mārama (film) =

2025 film by Taratoa Stappard

- Promotional poster
- Directed by: Taratoa Stappard
- Written by: Taratoa Stappard
- Produced by: Sharlene George; Rickylee Russell-Waipuka; Rouzie Hassanova
- Starring: Ariāna Osborne; Umi Myers; Evelyn Towersey; Errol Shand; Jordan Mooney; Mihi Te Rauhi Daniels; Turia Schmidt Peke; Toby Stephens
- Cinematography: Gin Loane
- Edited by: Dan Kircher
- Music by: Karl Sölve Steven; Rob Thorne
- Production company: Sweetshop Entertainment
- Distributed by: Vendetta Films
- Release dates: 5 September 2025 (TIFF); 12 February 2026 (New Zealand)
- Running time: 89 minutes
- Country: New Zealand
- Languages: English; Māori
- Box office: $125,785

Mārama is a 2025 New Zealand gothic horror film written and directed by Taratoa Stappard in his directorial debut. It stars Ariāna Osborne, Umi Myers, Evelyn Towersey, Errol Shand, Jordan Mooney, Mihi Te Rauhi Daniels, Turia Schmidt Peke, and Toby Stephens.

The film premiered at the 2025 Toronto International Film Festival, and was theatrically released in New Zealand on 12 February 2026. It was selected as the New Zealand entry for the Best International Feature Film at the 99th Academy Awards.

== Premise ==
Upon receiving a letter from a mysterious stranger claiming to have information about her parents, orphan Mary Stevens (Mārama) arrives in Yorkshire, England to find out more about her whakapapa.

On her arrival at Hawsker Manor, she is eagerly met by Nathanial Cole, who offers her a position as governess for his granddaughter Anne, but the house does not feel right.

== Plot ==
Mary Stevens (Mārama), a young Māori woman, arrives in Whitby, Yorkshire. She travelled from Wellington after receiving a letter from a stranger, Thomas Boyd, claiming to have information about her deceased parents.

Peggy, a servant at Hawsker Manor, takes Mary to meet Nathanial Cole, the master of the house. In a mirror that night, Mary sees a ghostly reflection: a haggard woman identical to her, who screams.

The next morning, Cole implores Mary to stay and work as a governess for his granddaughter Anne. He speaks te reo Māori and claims admiration for Māori culture. He tells her Boyd has been dead for months.

Anne shows Mary a garden containing a traditional wharenui marked with ancestral carvings, to Mary's horror. As she approaches the building, she collapses. Unconscious, she has a vision of a young Māori woman in a whaler's coat singing on a beach.

Mary returns to the wharenui. She explains its significance to Anne and tells her her Māori name, Mārama. That evening, Cole tells Mary that he raised Anne's late mother Emilia as his daughter, but married her to her adoptive brother, Arthur. He shows her a photo; Emilia is identical to Mary. Cole reveals that she was Mary's twin sister. Mary later finds a photograph of a heavily pregnant Emilia dated only one year prior, though Cole told her Emilia died giving birth to Anne.

At Cole's birthday party, his friend Jack Fenton, a white man with tā moko facial tattoos, wears a mockery of Māori dress to perform a racist parody of a Māori chant and a song about raping Māori women. Mary is furious and performs a haka to challenge him to fight. The party attendees clap and cheer, thinking she is part of the entertainment.

Mary has a vision of Cole in the wharenui beating her grandmother Arorangi and her mother Hinemoana to death in front of the infant Mary and Emilia. Cole takes Emilia away, leaving Mary for dead beneath Arorangi's corpse; Thomas Boyd rescues her. In the present, Arthur warns her to take Anne and leave the house, but Fenton drags him away by force.

That night, Cole slits Arthur's wrist with a razor, killing him. Fenton chloroforms Peggy and abducts Anne. Mary has a vision of Arorangi tattooing Hinemoana's chin with tā moko. Arorangi tells her to avenge her mother and take them all home. She says that Emilia's Māori name was Te Haeata.

Mary finds Arthur's body and is attacked by Fenton. Mary cuts his throat with the razor Cole used on Arthur. She enters a tunnel hidden behind a tukutuku-patterned door, which leads to the locked wharenui where Cole is waiting. He reveals the preserved heads of Arorangi and Hinemoana on display. He tells Mary that he is Emilia's and her father, and that Anne is also his child. He takes Emilia's head out of a box and places it beside the others. Mary stabs and decapitates him with a sword and harpoon mounted on the wall. She gathers the women's heads, sets the wharenui on fire, and escapes.

Peggy and Anne find Mary the next morning. Mary renames Anne with the Māori name Anahera. An epilogue shows Mārama, Peggy, and Anahera on a beach in Aotearoa New Zealand. A joint headstone for Arorangi, Hinemoana, and Te Haeata reads "Wāhine Māori" (Māori women).

== Cast ==
- Ariāna Osborne as Mary Stevens / Mārama and Emilia Cole / Te Haeata
- Toby Stephens as Nathanial Cole
- Umi Myers as Peggy
- Erroll Shand as Jack Fenton
- Evelyn Towersey as Anne / Anahera
- Jordan Mooney as Arthur Cole
- Mihi Te Rauhi Daniels as Hinemoana
- Turia Schmidt Peke as Arorangi
- Elliot Blakely as Thomas Boyd

== Production ==
The film is from writer-director Taratoa Stappard, with Sharlene George producing for The Sweetshop. Ricky Russell-Waipuka and Rouzie Hassanova are also producing with Paraone Gloyne as Māori language and culture producer. Executive Producers include Victoria Dabbs and Gal Greenspan for Sweetshop Entertainment, Jill Macnab and Phil Bremner for Vendetta Films and Badie Ali, Hamza Ali and Greg Newman for MPI Media.

The cast is led by Ariāna Osborne, Toby Stephens, and Umi Myers and also features Erroll Shand and Jordan Mooney.

The film was developed with support from Te Tumu Whakaata Taonga (The New Zealand Film Commission), imagineNATIVE, The Black List, Toronto International Film Festival, the Zurich Film Festival and the Berlinale Co-Production Market. The film is made in association with the New Zealand Film Commission, NZ On Air, Whakaata Māori and Images & Sound. Principal photography took place in late-2024 in Auckland and in the Otago region.

== Release ==
Mārama had its world premiere at the 2025 Toronto International Film Festival on 5 September. Before the premiere, North American rights were negotiated by Dark Sky Films and Watermelon Pictures, with a release set for the first quarter of 2026. It was theatrically released in New Zealand by Vendetta Films on 12 February 2026, followed by a limited release in the United States by Dark Sky Films and Watermelon Pictures on 17 April.

=== Home media ===
Mārama was made available to rent exclusively on Letterboxd Video Store for video on demand on 25 May 2026. It was made available on other streaming platforms on 9 June.

== Reception ==
=== Critical response ===
On the review aggregator website Rotten Tomatoes, 100% of 49 critics' reviews are positive. The website's consensus reads: "Thoughtfully informed by Māori culture and the legacy of colonialism, Mārama is an unsettling gothic horror told with invigorating flair."

=== Accolades ===
During the 2026 New Zealand Screen Awards on 19 November 2026, Mārama won three awards: "Best Cinematography - Feature Film" (Gin Loane), "Best Production Design - Feature" (Nick Williams) and "Best Costume Design - Feature" (Sarah Voon).

== See also ==
- List of submissions to the 99th Academy Awards for Best International Feature Film
- List of New Zealand submissions for the Academy Award for Best International Feature Film
