= Horrible Histories: The Movie – Rotten Romans =

2019 British historical comedy film

- Theatrical release poster
- Directed by: Dominic Brigstocke
- Screenplay by: Jessica Swale; Giles Pilbrow; Caroline Norris
- Based on: Horrible Histories by Terry Deary
- Produced by: Will Clarke; Caroline Norris
- Starring: Emilia Jones; Sebastian Croft; Nick Frost; Craig Roberts; Kate Nash; Rupert Graves; Alex Macqueen; Lee Mack; Warwick Davis; Sanjeev Bhaskar; Alexander Armstrong; Chris Addison; Derek Jacobi; Kim Cattrall
- Cinematography: John Sorapure
- Edited by: Nigel Williams
- Music by: Richie Webb; Matt Katz; Iain Farrington
- Production companies: Altitude Film Entertainment; Amazon Prime Video; Ingenious Media; Silver Reel; CBBC; BBC Films; Citrus Films; Scholastic Entertainment; Lion Television
- Distributed by: Altitude Film Distribution
- Release date: 26 July 2019 (United Kingdom)
- Running time: 92 minutes
- Country: United Kingdom
- Language: English
- Box office: $3.8 million

Horrible Histories: The Movie – Rotten Romans is a 2019 British historical comedy film directed by Dominic Brigstocke, based on the book series of the same name by author Terry Deary, and the television series of 2009 and 2015 on CBBC. The film production, of one of the stories, was announced in March 2016. The film is a co-production, between Altitude Film Entertainment, BBC Films and Citrus Films. It was released on 26 July 2019 to mixed reviews.

In the film, a Roman teenager is exiled to Roman Britain because one of his schemes angered the Roman emperor Nero. To his horror, the youth has to serve as a soldier against the Boudican revolt.

== Synopsis ==
Atti, a Roman teenager with brains but no muscle, is always coming up with schemes, but one of these upsets Emperor Nero. For his punishment, he is sent to the cold wet province of Roman Britain on the fringe of the Roman Empire.

Whilst in Britain, he is captured by Orla, a feisty Celt, but they eventually come to an understanding, but to Atti's horror, when he is returned to his regiment, he finds himself pitted against Orla and her tribe at the Boudican revolt's Battle of Watling Street.

== Cast ==
- Emilia Jones as Orla
- Sebastian Croft as Atti
- Nick Frost as Arghus
- Craig Roberts as Emperor Nero
- Kim Cattrall as Agrippina the Younger
- Kate Nash as Boudicca
- Rupert Graves as Governor Suetonius Paulinus
- Alex Macqueen as Sycophantus
- Derek Jacobi as Emperor Claudius
- Lee Mack as Decimus
- Chris Addison as Traffic reporter
- Samantha Spiro as Mrs Felix
- Sanjeev Bhaskar as Mr. Felix
- Tony Gardner as Antonius
- Katherine Jakeways as Julia
- Tim Downie as the British legate
- Ella Smith as Mrs. Dougal
- Alexander Armstrong as Procurator Catus Decianus
- Dustin Demri-Burns as Crazy Cedric
- Warwick Davis as Gladiator Trainer
- Lucy Montgomery as Birte (Third New Recruit)
- Tom Stourton as Percy
- Jessica Ransom as Drusilla
- Ncuti Gatwa as Timidius
- Dominique Moore as Traveller
- Dimitris Konstantinou-Hautecoeur as Palace Guard
- Richard David-Caine as Soothsayer
- Sarah Hadland as Irene the Iceni
- Joanna Bacon as Brenda
- Roy Martin Thorn as Roman Soldier
- Jalaal Hartley as Weedy messenger
- Jordan Scowen as Celcius
- Katy Wix as Watling Street Presenter
- Jamie Demetriou as Dimidius
- Mike Wozniak as Owen Bowen
- John Eccleston as Rattus Rattus (voice)

== Production ==
The rights to a film were optioned from the Horrible Histories author, Terry Deary. The project was filmed in Bulgaria and the United Kingdom, including in the Roman villa and Iron Age village at Butser Ancient Farm in Hampshire, and Iron Age roundhouses at Celtic Harmony in Hertfordshire.

== Reception ==
=== Box office ===
Rotten Romans opened to $754,973 in the United Kingdom. As of 1 November 2019, the film has earned a total of $3.7 million, at the box office.

=== Critical response ===
On Rotten Tomatoes, the film holds an approval rating of 69%, based on 29 reviews, with an average rating of 5.7/10. The website's consensus says, "Charmingly broad and appropriately goofy, Horrible Histories: The Movie – Rotten Romans lands its punchlines often enough to entertain its target audience."

Peter Bradshaw gave the film three out of five stars. He describes Derek Jacobi reprising the role which made him famous in 1976 as the Emperor Claudius, as the film's most sensational coup. Bradshaw calls the film "a decent bit of school holiday entertainment" although he felt the broad humour was aimed at (very young) audiences, and not as good as the film Bill, which was produced by the writers and actors from the television series of Horrible Histories.

Wendy Ide gave the film two out of five stars, and felt that the film lacked some of the "essential rottenness", as the linear format of the film rather than the skit-based structure of the series led to a loss of "the punchy hit rate of gung ho, gross out that made the series such a deliciously uncouth pleasure".
