= The Freedom of the Seas (play) =

Play by Walter Hackett

- Original language: English
- Written by: Walter Hackett
- Genre: War comedy

Premiere
- Date: 24 July 1918
- Place: Royalty Theatre

The Freedom of the Seas is a 1918 British comedy play by Walter Hackett. A downtrodden London clerk joins the Royal Navy during the First World War. Given command of a tramp steamer he rises to the occasion and thwarts the plans of a German spy. It appeared at the Royalty Theatre before transferring to the Theatre Royal, Haymarket where the cast included Dennis Eadie, Billie Carleton, Tom Reynolds, Marion Lorne, Randle Ayrton, Sydney Valentine and James Carew.

== Adaptation ==
In 1934 it was made into a film Freedom of the Seas by British International Pictures. Directed by Marcel Varnel it starred Clifford Mollison and Wendy Barrie.

== Bibliography ==
- Goble, Alan. The Complete Index to Literary Sources in Film. Walter de Gruyter, 1999.
- Maunder, Andrew, Smith, Angela K., Potter, Jane & Tate, Trudi . British Literature of World War I, Volume 5, Volume 5. Routledge, 2017.
