= UnCommonCon =

Former comic book convention

- Status: Inactive
- Genre: Multi-genre
- Venue: Hyatt Regency Hotel-DFW Airport
- Locations: Dallas, Texas
- Country: United States
- Inaugurated: 2000
- Most recent: 2001
- Attendance: 1,200 in 2000
- Organizer: James Echols, Uncommon Solutions
- Filing status: For Profit
- Website: http://www.uncommoncon.com/

UnCommonCon was a short-lived comics and science fiction convention held in the Dallas, Texas, area on Thanksgiving weekend. James Echols was the show chairman and president of event sponsor Uncommon Solutions. This combination of media, comics, and literary guests with gaming, art, anime, and film was an ambitious attempt to create a large convention with regional and national appeal. UnCommonCon suffered financial collapse just before the 2001 event.

== History ==
=== Dates and guests ===
The first UnCommonCon, UnCommonCon 2000, was held November 24–26, 2000, at the Hyatt Regency Hotel-DFW Airport located by Terminal C at Dallas/Fort Worth International Airport. Guests included author Aaron Allston, author Tracy Hickman, author P.N. Elrod, actor Ted Raimi, Melissa Benson, Babylon 5 actor Jason Carter, "Hulk" actor Lou Ferrigno, actor Victor Lundin, artist Bryan Talbot, and many more. Screenings included Babylon Park and Laughing Boy. Organizers were reported to have expected attendance of around 4000 but only 1200 people actually attended.

The second UnCommonCon, UnCommonCon 2001, was scheduled to be held November 23–25, 2001, at the Wyndham Anatole Hotel in Dallas, Texas. Scheduled guests included author Aaron Allston, artist Sergio Aragones, author Lee Martindale, and author Michael Stackpole. The first major auction by Heritage Auctions was scheduled to be held in conjunction with the convention. There were several factors, including a sharp drop in domestic travel after 9/11, that led to cancellation of the event roughly two weeks before the second convention was to occur but organizers publicly blamed slow dealer tables sales and their failure to meet room block commitments resulting in a $60,000 invoice from the hotel.

=== Demise/aftermath ===
When UnCommonCon failed unexpectedly due to financial difficulties, A-Kon sponsors Phoenix Entertainment stepped in with Itzacon. This event was hurriedly put together and "inherited" a number of guests from the UnCommonCon roster who had already completed travel plans for this Thanksgiving weekend. Con organizer Meri Hazlewood later claimed a paid attendance of "about 540 people (not counting dealers and staff)."

Heritage Comic Auctions held its "million dollar" comics and movie poster auction, as scheduled, at the Wyndham Anatole. They provided free vendor space to vintage comics and art dealers to advertise the now-smaller event and encourage more people to attend the auction in person. 703 of the 845 lots sold at auction bringing in a total of $960,649.05
