= Edgar Manning =

Jamaican jazz musician and criminal

Edgar (Eddie) Manning (1889 or 1890 – 8 February 1931), was a Jamaican jazz musician and criminal who became known as the "dope-king" of 1920s London.

Manning was born in Jamaica but had settled in London by 1916.

== See also ==
- Brilliant Chang
