= Sebastian Croft =

English actor (born 2001)

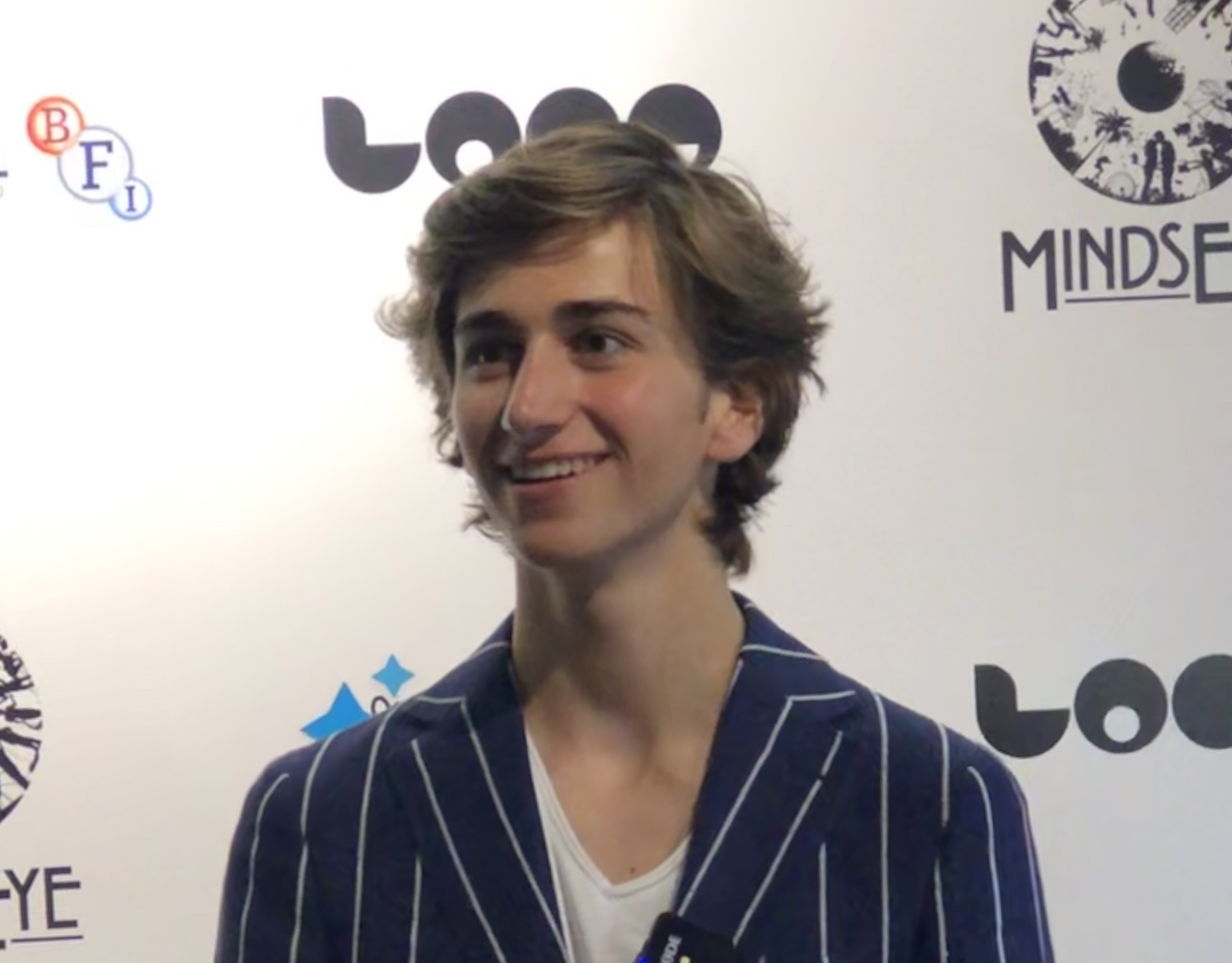
- Croft in July 2019
- Born: Sebastian Theodore Kemble Croft; 16 December 2001 (age 24); Oxford, England
- Education: Chandlings Prep School; Dragon School; St Edward's School, Oxford; Mander Portman Woodward
- Occupations: Actor; musician
- Years active: 2007–present

Sebastian Theodore Kemble "Bash" Croft (born 16 December 2001) is an English actor and musician. He began his career as a child actor on stage before making his television debut as Young Ned Stark in Game of Thrones (2016). He earned a BAFTA Children's Award nomination for his role in Horrible Histories: The Movie – Rotten Romans (2019). He has since starred in the Netflix series Heartstopper (2022–2024) and took part in the second series of The Celebrity Traitors, which he won alongside Romesh Ranganathan.

Croft's voice work includes the film Where Is Anne Frank (2021), "Ice", an instalment of the Netflix anthology Love, Death & Robots (2021) and the game Hogwarts Legacy.

== Early life and education ==
Croft was born on 16 December 2001 in Oxford to an English father and a Greek Cypriot mother. Croft was named after Sebastian Flyte, one of the main characters of Evelyn Waugh's novel Brideshead Revisited. He began taking acting classes at the Abingdon-on-Thames branch of Stagecoach when he was seven and at Michael Xavier's MX Masterclass, of which Croft is now a patron.

Croft was privately educated at Chandlings Prep School, the Dragon School and St Edward's School, Oxford. He completed A-Levels at Mander Portman Woodward in English, Philosophy and Film.

== Career ==
=== Theatre ===
Croft made his first West End stage appearance in 2010 in Sam Mendes' production of Oliver! (Theatre Royal Drury Lane). In 2011, he was cast as Gavroche in Les Misérables (Queen's Theatre). Croft was later handpicked by producer Cameron Mackintosh to return to Oliver! this time playing the title role in the UK touring company for eighteen months. In 2013, Croft played Tommy in the Royal Shakespeare Company production of Matilda (Cambridge Theatre). His final musical performance as a juvenile was in the title role of the world premiere production of The Secret Diary of Adrian Mole (Leicester Curve). Prominent musical theatre workshops include: I Can't Sing, The Secret Diary of Adrian Mole, Bumblescratch, Danny Hero and The Braille Legacy. Prominent one night concerts and performances include: Rags: The Musical (Lyric Theatre) and A Charity Concert With Emeli Sande and Laura Wright. In June 2016 Croft appeared in the West End Live presentation of Bumblescratch in Trafalgar Square.

In 2014, Croft's vocals were featured in the National Theatre Live's production of Coriolanus (Donmar Warehouse) with Tom Hiddleston. Croft workshopped the play Emil and The Detectives (National Theatre) in the title role of Emil Tischbein. In 2016, Croft was cast in the role of Prince Arthur in Sir Trevor Nunn's production of Shakespeare's King John (Rose Theatre) for which Croft received high praise from the national press.

In 2023, in his first stage appearance in eight years, Croft appeared in Amy Herzog's play 4000 Miles at the Minerva Theatre at Chichester Festival Theatre, with Dame Eileen Atkins.

=== Film and television ===
In 2016, Croft appeared in the ITV and Fox series Houdini and Doyle and the Sky Atlantic and Showtime series Penny Dreadful. Croft rose to prominence portraying the role of a young Eddard Stark (portrayed by Sean Bean as an adult and Robert Aramayo as a young adult) in the sixth series of the HBO series Game of Thrones.

Croft made his feature film debut in 2017 as a Young David Logan in The Hippopotamus. He appeared in the 2019 films Music, War and Love and Horrible Histories: The Movie – Rotten Romans as Young Robert Pulaski and Atti respectively, the latter of which earned him a BAFTA Children's Award nomination in the Young Performer category.

Croft voiced Peter van Daan in the animated fantasy film Where Is Anne Frank, which premiered at the 2021 Cannes Film Festival. He lent his voice to Volume II of the Netflix animated anthology Love, Death & Robots in the episode "Ice". Croft and Ty Tennant were cast as the Dead Boy Detectives Charles Rowland and Edwin Paine respectively in series 3 of the DC Universe series Doom Patrol.

In April 2021, it was announced Croft would play Ben Hope in the 2022 Netflix series Heartstopper, an adaptation of the webcomic and graphic novel of the same name by Alice Oseman. Later that year, he was part of the cast of the horror-fantasy film Dampyr released in Italy on 28 October 2022. Croft co-starred with Charithra Chandran in the young adult romantic comedy How to Date Billy Walsh for Amazon Prime.

In August 2023, it was confirmed that Croft would not be returning for the third series of Heartstopper as Ben Hope, given his character's storyline had finished in the second series's seventh episode.

In November 2023, it was announced Croft would star in the film Get Away (originally titled Svalta) with Nick Frost and Aisling Bea. The same month, Croft joined the cast of the BBC crime drama series Dope Girls.

Croft appeared on the second series of The Celebrity Traitors in October 2026. He reached the final where he won the series with Romesh Ranganathan.

=== Music ===
On 7 November 2025, Croft independently released his debut single "Tokyo" after teasing snippets weeks before. On 4 March 2026, he released his second single "Better than ever".

In October 2026, Croft released two singles, "Pretty People", on October 2nd and "Good Light" on October 16th.

== Personal life ==
Croft has dyslexia. He identifies as queer and gay, and has said that he was outed at school by a male classmate he was in a relationship with. For Pride Month in 2022, Croft tweeted that he had created a t-shirt design of "two gay dinosaurs kissing, reminding everyone that Queer has always been here." All of the money from sales of the shirt was to go to Choose Love and Rainbow Railroad – two charities helping LGBTQ refugees.

== Acting credits ==
=== Film ===
Key
†	Denotes films that have not yet been released

Year	Title	Role	Notes
2017	The Hippopotamus	Young David Logan	
2019	Horrible Histories: The Movie – Rotten Romans	Atti	Nominated for Best Young Performer BAFTA Award
2019	I'll Find You	Young Robert Pulaski	Formerly titled Music, War and Love
2021	Where Is Anne Frank	Peter van Daan	Voice role
2021	School's Out Forever	Pugh	
2022	Dampyr	Yuri	
2023	Wonderwell	Daniele	
2024	How to Date Billy Walsh	Archibald "Archie" Arnold	
2024	Get Away	Sam	

=== Television ===
Key
†	Denotes television productions that have not yet been released

Year	Title	Role	Notes	Ref.
2016	Houdini & Doyle	Newsie	Episode: "Spring-Heel'd Jack"	
2016	Game of Thrones	Young Eddard Stark	2 episodes	
2016	Penny Dreadful	Boy Familiar	4 episodes	
2021	Love, Death & Robots	Fletcher	Episode: "Ice"	
2021	Doom Patrol	Charles Rowland	Episode: "Dead Patrol"	
2022–2023	Heartstopper	Ben Hope	13 episodes	
2025	Dope Girls	Silvio Salucci	6 episodes	
2026	Celebrity Traitors	Himself (contestant)	Series 2	

=== Music video ===
Year	Song	Artist	Ref.
2014	"Baby, It's Cold Outside"	Michael Bublé and Idina Menzel	
2025	"Tokyo"	Himself	
2026	"Better than ever"	Himself	
2026	"Questions"	Maisie Peters	
2026	"Pretty People"	Himself	

=== Radio and audio ===
Year	Title	Role	Writer	Broadcast	Ref
2023	A Single Act	Ben Vane	A. L. Kennedy	BBC Radio 4 audio drama	
2025	Open, Heaven	Narrator	Seán Hewitt	Audiobook	

=== Video games ===
Year	Video game	Character	Ref
2023	Hogwarts Legacy	Protagonist (male voice)	

== Discography ==
=== Extended plays ===
Title	Details
The Great Forever	Released: 13 November 2026; Label: Flyte Productions; Formats: Digital download, streaming, CD

=== Singles ===
Year	Title	Album
2025	"Tokyo"	The Great Forever
2026	"Better Than Ever"	Non-album single
2026	"Pretty People"	The Great Forever
2026	"Good Light"	The Great Forever
2026	"Everything Always Now"	The Great Forever

== Awards and nominations ==
Year	Award	Category	Nominated work	Result	Ref.
2019	British Academy Children's Awards	Young Performer	Horrible Histories: The Movie – Rotten Romans	Nominated	
