= Freedom of the Seas (film) =

- Directed by: Marcel Varnel
- Written by: Roger Burford
- Based on: Freedom of the Seas by Walter Hackett
- Produced by: Walter C. Mycroft
- Starring: Clifford Mollison; Wendy Barrie; Zelma O'Neal
- Cinematography: Otto Kanturek
- Edited by: Sidney Cole
- Production company: British International Pictures
- Distributed by: Wardour Films
- Release date: 17 September 1934
- Running time: 74 minutes
- Country: United Kingdom
- Language: English

Freedom of the Seas is a 1934 British comedy war film directed by Marcel Varnel and starring Clifford Mollison, Wendy Barrie and Zelma O'Neal. It was adapted by Roger Burford from the West End play of the same name by Walter Hackett.

== Production ==
Produced by British International Pictures, the film was shot at Elstree Studios with sets designed by the art director Cedric Dawe. It was French director Varnel's first film in Britain following a spell in Hollywood. He went on to be a prominent maker of comedies during the following decade, working with Will Hay, George Formby and others. It is also notable as David Lean's first film credit, as focus puller.

== Plot ==
Smith, a mild-mannered clerk, unexpectedly becomes one of the first among his colleagues to sign up on the declaration of World War I. Undashing but courageous, he foils a German sabotage plot.

== Cast ==
- Clifford Mollison as Smith
- Wendy Barrie as Phyllis Harcourt
- Zelma O'Neal as Jennie
- H. F. Maltby as Harcourt
- Tyrell Davis as Cavendish
- James Carew as Bottom
- Cecil Ramage as Berkstrom
- Henry Wenman as Wallace
- Frederick Peisley as Jackson
- Frank Atkinson as O'Hara
- Charles Paton as Gamp

== Bibliography ==
- Goble, Alan. The Complete Index to Literary Sources in Film. Walter de Gruyter, 1999.
