= Comicforum =

Internet forum

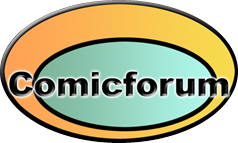
Comicforum logo in 2020

Comicforum is an internet forum with a focus on comics that was founded in 2000.

== Development and content ==
When the forum went online in 2000, it was the only comics-related discussion forum. Various large comic publishers like Carlsen, Egmont Ehapa, and Panini Comics opened official forums.

Carlsen left Comicforum in 2002 and opened new official forums at Comics in Leipzig. In 2004, Panini left as well and opened its own Panini Comics Forum. Carlsen returned to Comicforum in March 2009. However, the Carlsen Manga-Forum remained at Comics in Leipzig until January 2012. Egmont Ehapa abandoned social media and left the Comicforum at the end of 2017. At this time, alongside the large publisher Carlsen, there are many comic publishers located at Comicforum. Also, there is a large area for artists.

The Comicforum of today is not only a forum for comics, but also for games, books, films, and music. Currently, there are 35,000 registered members of which about 800 are active every day.

The subject areas in the part of the forum dedicated to comics are:

- Official publisher forums
- Retailers and support (for example the collectors software Comickeeper)
- Magazines (forums of comic magazines, online and printed)
- Fan pages and fan forums
- Fairs and contacts
- Themes (for example: albums, anime, and manga)
- Artist area (presentation- and critic-forum, job market for illustrators)
- Marketplace

== Awards ==
For its artist area, Comicforum received the ICOM Sonderpreis 2004. The Interessenverband Comic, which awards this independent comic prize, explained this with the connecting effect the forum has for the comic fans. Additionally, they note the creation of networks for artists, which influence later publications, and call Comicforum a factor the German comic landscape can no longer be imagined without.
