= Mauro Boselli (writer) =

Italian comic book writer & editor (born 1953)

- Born: 30 August 1953 (age 72); Milan, Lombardy, Italy
- Occupations: Comic book and movie writer, editor, novelist
- Writing career
- Years active: 1984–present
- Genres: Horror, western, adventure
- Notable works: Dampyr; Tex Willer
- Notable awards: Micheluzzi Award; U Giancu's Prize (2005)

Mauro Boselli (born 30 August 1953 in Milan) is an Italian comic book writer and editor. He is also a novelist, screenwriter, and essayist.

== Career ==
He joined the staff of Sergio Bonelli Editore in 1984, writing for popular comics titles such as Mister No and Zagor. He became chief editor of the latter in 1993. In 2000 he co-created together with Maurizio Colombo the horror series Dampyr.

Ha has been chief editor of Tex since 2012 and launched a new series titled Tex Willer in 2018.

In 2022, he wrote with Mauro Uzzeo, Giovanni Masi and Alberto Ostini the film adaptation of Dampyr, directed by Riccardo Chemello.

== Works ==
=== Comics ===
Title	Series	Issue(s)	Ref.
Mister No	Almanacco dell'avventura	1994 ed.	
Zagor	Zagor (regular series)	#334–36, 345–50, 353–59, 362–67, 376–79, 386–91, 397–400, 411–14, 420–24, 427–35, 469–71, 479–82, 490–93, 552–56, 573–77, 586–88	
Zagor	Almanacco dell'avventura	ed. 1997, 2001	
Zagor	Speciale Zagor	#4, 6, 8–9, 11–12	
Tex Willer	Tex (regular series)	#309–10, 407–09, 416–18, 420–22, 435–40, 445–46, 452–54, 458–60, 463–65, 467–70, 473–74, 478–79, 483–84, 488–89, 497–99, 506–07, 523–25, 528–29, 538–39, 544–47, 556–57, 563–64, 569–74, 576–80, 583–84, 593–95, 600–03, 606–08, 611–15, 618–20, 627–28, 633–44, 649–53, 658–61, 668–70, 673–75, 678–79, 682–83, 695–700, 705–07, 716–18	
Tex Willer	Almanacco del west	ed. 1997, 1998, 2000, 2003, 2007, 2011, 2013	
Tex Willer	Maxi Tex	#5, 17, 21	
Tex Willer	Speciale Tex	#12, 23–24, 27–28, 32–36	
Tex Willer	Color Tex	#1, 3–6, 8, 10, 12, 14, 16	
Tex Willer	Tex. Romanzi a fumetti	#2–3, 6–7	
Tex Willer	Tex Magazine	#1, 4, 7	
Tex Willer	Tex Willer (second series)	#1–13, 18–28	
Tex Willer	Speciale Tex Willer	#1	
Dampyr	Dampyr (regular series)	#1–3, 5–8, 12, 14–17, 20–23, 25, 27–31, 33–38, 40–41, 43–47, 49–55, 57–59, 62, 64–66, 70, 73, 75, 77–78, 81–82, 84, 86–91, 93–94, 97–105, 107, 111–12, 116, 119, 121, 126–27, 130, 133–36, 139, 143–46, 148, 150–53, 157–58, 161–63, 168, 173–74, 177–78, 180, 182–83, 185–88, 192–93, 196–202, 209, 211, 217–19, 222, 224–25, 230–35, 241, 243–44, 246–47, 252	
Dampyr	Speciale Dampyr	#1–2, 4–6, 9, 16	
Dampyr	Maxi Dampyr	#2, 10	
Dampyr	Dampyr Magazine	#1	
Dylan Dog	Dylan Dog (regular series)	#165	
Dylan Dog	Dylan Dog Color Fest	#9	
Le Storie	Le Storie (regular series)	#35	
Le Storie	Speciale Le Storie	#2, 6	

=== Novels ===
- Tex Willer - Il romanzo della mia vita (Mondadori, 2011)

== Filmography ==
Film
Year	Title	Writer	Notes
2022	Dampyr	Yes	
