= Frida Gustavsson =

Swedish model

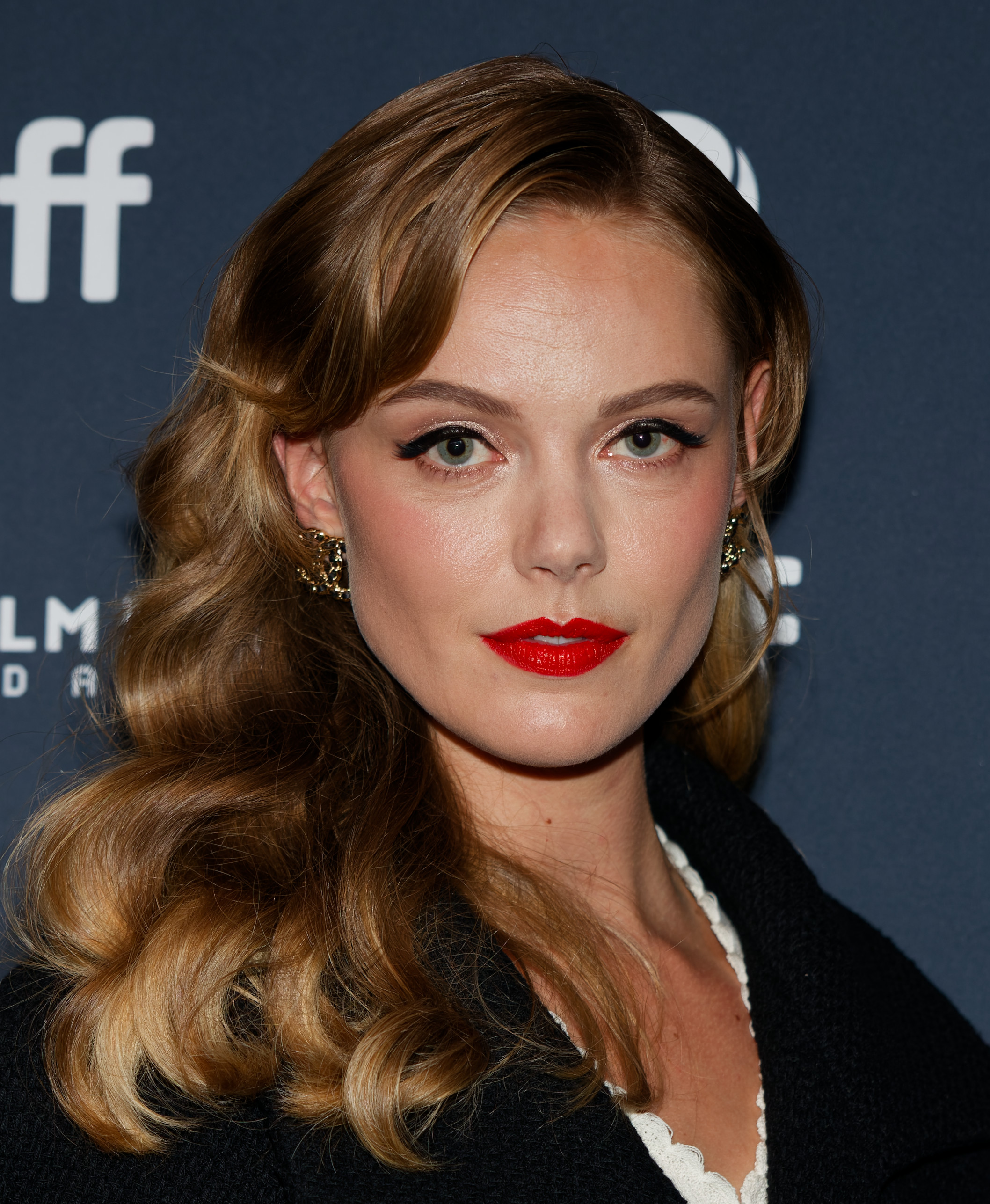
- Gustavsson at TIFF 2024
- Born: 6 June 1993 (age 33); Stockholm, Sweden
- Occupations: Model; actress
- Years active: 2008–present
- Spouses: Hjalmar Rechlin (m. 2015, divorced); Marcel Engdahl (m. 2022)
- Modeling information
- Height: 6 ft 2 in (188cm)
- Hair color: Blonde
- Eye color: Blue/Grey

Frida Gustavsson (born 6 June 1993) is a Swedish actress and former model, best known for playing Freydís Eiríksdóttir in the Netflix historical drama series Vikings: Valhalla.

== Early life and education ==
Frida Gustavsson was born in Stockholm on 6 June 1993 and raised in a suburb of the city. Her mother worked as a teacher, and her father worked as a salesman.

In June 2011, she graduated from St. Martins Gymnasium in Sundbyberg, Sweden.

Throughout her childhood, Gustavsson was active in athletics. She was a runner, hurdler, and a long jumper. She dreamed of competing in the Olympics, but a knee injury at age 14 prevented her from pursuing her goal.

== Career ==
=== Modelling ===
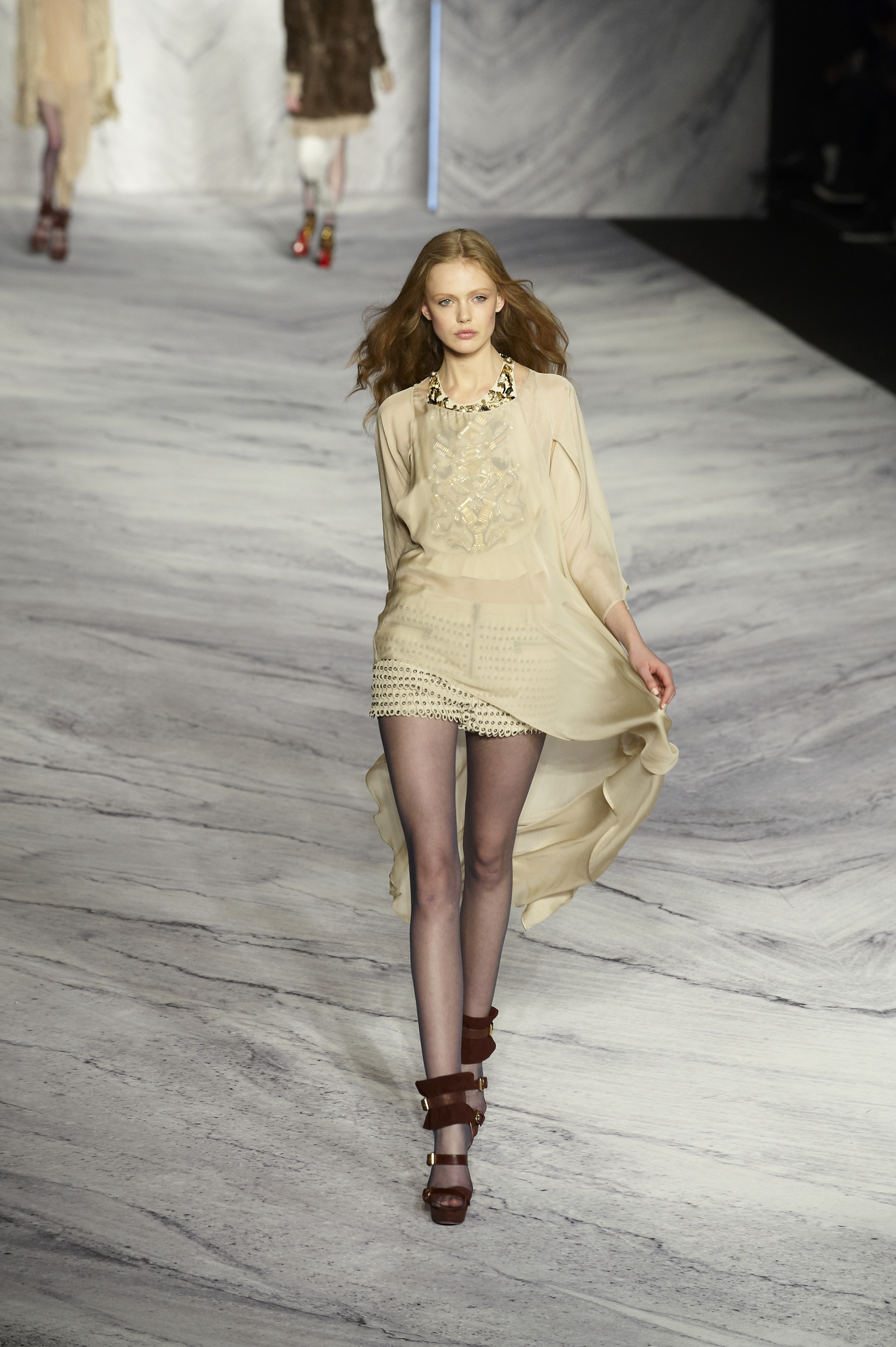
Gustavsson walking the runway for 3.1 Phillip Lim in 2010

Frida Gustavsson in 2026

Gustavsson was scouted at age 10 when she was at an IKEA with her father. She began modeling locally in 2008, and in the same year she moved to Japan to pursue modelling. She opened the Valentino Haute Couture fall 2012 show in Paris. She has walked shows for dozens of fashion brands such as Fendi, Christian Dior, Alexander McQueen, Marc Jacobs, Michael Kors, Calvin Klein, Oscar de la Renta, Hermès, Jean Paul Gaultier, Dolce & Gabbana, Yves Saint Laurent, Ralph Lauren, and Versace. She also walked in the Victoria's Secret Fashion Show 2012. In 2013, Gustavsson was announced as the face of Maybelline, and appeared in their ads and commercials. She was the fourth most requested model of the spring 2010 season, behind Kasia Struss, Liu Wen, and Constance Jablonski.

Gustavsson has appeared in the magazines Elle, W, Numéro, American, Italian, French, British, German, and Japanese Vogue, L'Officiel, Crash, and others. In March 2010, she appeared on the cover of the German Vogue. She has appeared in advertising campaigns for Marc Jacobs, Jill Stuart, Anna Sui, H&M, Max Mara, Tiger of Sweden and Prada. Gustavsson won Elle Sweden's Model of the Year award in 2011.

She has appeared in adverts for Nina Ricci.

After five years of a break from modeling, she walked for Jean Paul Gaultier Haute Couture Spring 2020 Show.

=== Acting ===
Gustavsson began her acting career in 2014, when she auditioned for the role of Rey for Star Wars: The Force Awakens but did not get the part.

In 2019, Gustavsson appeared in the first season of the fantasy drama television series The Witcher as Visenna, the mother of protagonist Geralt of Rivia.

From 2022 to 2024, she starred as the great Viking warrior Freydís Eiríksdóttir in the Netflix series Vikings: Valhalla.

She plays the young version of the character Marianne in the 2025 television drama series Faithless (Trolösa), based on the 2000 feature film Faithless, directed by Tomas Alfredson. His co-stars include Gustav Lindh as her lover David, as well as Lena Endre, Jesper Christensen, and August Wittgenstein. The series premiered on SVT on 26 January 2025, and was scheduled to be released on other platforms, including Apple TV.

== Personal life ==
In 2015, she married photographer Hjalmar Rechlin. The couple have since divorced.

In 2022, she married Marcel Engdahl at the Storkyrkan Church in Stockholm.

== Filmography ==
=== Film ===
Year	Title	Role	Notes
2013	Nina L'eau	Self	Branded short film
2019	Swoon	Ninni Nilsson	
2020	Unblinded	Emma	Short film
2021	Tigers	Vibeke	
2022	Dampyr	Tesla Dubcek	Feature film
2025	Icefall	Sirena	

=== Television ===
Year	Title	Role	Notes
1998	När karusellerna sover	Pupil	S1.E1
2012	Love Advent	Self	S2.E16
2015	Arne Dahl: Aftershock	Jenna Svensson	Mini series, 2 episodes
2019	Dröm	Adult Thea / Thea 33	13 episodes
2019	The Witcher	Ma / Visenna	(Geralt's mother), S1.E8
2019	The Inspector and the Sea	Luna Akkers	S1.E26
2020	De utvalda	Alex	6 episodes
2020–2022	Partisan	Clara	5 episodes
2022–2024	Vikings: Valhalla	Freydís Eiríksdóttir	26 episodes
2025	Faithless (Trolösa)	Marianne Vogler	Mini-series, 6 episodes
2026	Bytet (A Couple of Lies)	Helene Wester	Mini series, 4 episodes
