= Stuart Martin =

Scottish actor (born 1986)

- Martin at the 2026 Toronto International Film Festival
- Born: 8 January 1986 (age 40); Ayr, Scotland
- Occupation: Actor
- Years active: 2009–present
- Spouse: Lisa McGrillis (m. 2015)
- Children: 2

Stuart Martin (born 8 January 1986) is a Scottish actor. He is known for his roles in the Channel 4 comedy-drama Babylon (2014), as well as the historical dramas Medici: Masters of Florence (2016), Jamestown (2017–2019), and Miss Scarlet and The Duke (2020–2024).

== Early life ==
Martin studied drama at the Royal Conservatoire of Scotland.

== Career ==
Martin portrayed Tony in the comedy-drama television series Babylon in 2014, and Lorenzo de Medici in the historical drama Medici: Masters of Florence in 2016. From 2017 to 2019, he played Silas Sharrow in the drama television series Jamestown. Martin next starred as Detective Inspector William Wellington in the period crime drama Miss Scarlet and The Duke for four seasons from 2020 to 2024.

== Personal life ==
Martin met his wife, actress Lisa McGrillis, at a Christmas party in the National Theatre bar. They have two children.

== Filmography ==
=== Film ===
Year	Title	Role	Notes
2010	Robin Hood	Messenger	
2011	Late Bloomers	Nurse	
2011	A Thousand Kisses Deep	Gangster 2	
2014	50 Kisses	Thomas	
2014	My Accomplice	Frank	
2015	Slow West	Callum	
2018	Only You	Shane	
2019	Our Ladies	Terry Mooney	
2021	Army of Thieves	Brad Cage	
2022	Dampyr	Emil Kurjak	
2023	Rebel Moon	Den	
2024	Rebel Moon – Part Two: The Scargiver	Den	
2026	The Last Photograph	Ethan Black	

=== Television ===
Year	Title	Role	Notes
2009	Taggart	Jamie Revie	Episode: "So Long Baby"
2011–2012	River City	Lorne McKay	2 episodes
2012	Hatfields & McCoys	Wounded Rebel Soldier	2 episodes
2013	The Field of Blood	DC Dan Burns	2 episodes
2013	Hebburn	Lindsay	4 episodes
2014	Game of Thrones	Lannister Soldier	Episode: "Two Swords"
2014	Babylon	PC Tony Forbes	7 episodes
2015	Crossing Lines	Luke Wilkinson	12 episodes
2015	Silent Witness	Jason Simons	Episodes: "One of Our Own" Parts 1 & 2
2015	A Song for Jenny	Colin	Television film
2016	Medici: Masters of Florence	Lorenzo de Medici	8 episodes
2017–2019	Jamestown	Silas Sharrow	24 episodes
2020–2024	Miss Scarlet and The Duke	Detective Inspector William Wellington	Main role
2021	Crime	Stuart Lennox	4 episodes
2024	Twilight of the Gods	Leif (voice)	8 episodes
2025	In Flight	Cormac Kelleher	6 episodes
TBA	Sutherland	Logan	Upcoming six-part drama
