= Marek Kohn =

British science writer and journalist

- Education: University of Sussex; University of Brighton
- Occupation: Science journalists
- Spouse: Sue Matthias Kohn
- Writing career
- Language: English
- Genre: Science

Marek Kohn is an English science writer on evolution, biology and society.

== Early life and education ==
Kohn was born to a Polish father and a British mother. Kohn holds an undergraduate degree in neurobiology from the University of Sussex, a PhD from the University of Brighton and has held fellowships at both schools. He is currently an honorary research fellow with the latter. His articles have appeared in The Independent, New Scientist, Prospect, Financial Times, and The Guardian, and he writes frequently for the New Statesman.

== Career ==
His first two books were on drugs, their cultural history, and their politics. He is the author of seven books and hundreds of articles.

Kohn's book, A Reason for Everything (2004), has received widespread praise, including Steve Jones' stating in his Nature review that "every evolutionist should read it," and Andrew Brown, author of the Darwin Wars, writing in his Guardian review, "one of the best science writers we have."

In 1999, Kohn had proposed, together with the archaeologist Steven Mithen, the "sexy hand-axe hypothesis." This hypothesis proposes that pressures related to sexual selection could result in men making symmetric hand axes to demonstrate their cognitive and physiological fitness.

Following the publication of his name in a list of persons invited to participate in Steve Sailer's Human Biodiversity Institute discussion pages, Kohn wrote to Lynn Conway to dissociate himself from many of the participants' scientific and political views.

Kohn has also written about the possible future effects of climate change on Britain's landscape and society; health inequalities; the evolutionary psychology of trust; and Poles in British society. Kohn is also the author of a guide to the Wellcome Collection.

In December 2014, Kohn also contributed to the BBC Radio 4 Live Documentary: Palace of Great War Varieties presented by Matthew Sweet.

== Personal life ==
Kohn resides in Brighton with his wife, Sue Matthias Kohn; the couple have a son.

== Books ==
- Narcomania: On Heroin (1987)
- Dope Girls: The Birth of the British Drug Underground (1992; re-released 2003)
- The Race Gallery: The Return of Racial Science (1995; re-released 1996)
- As We Know It: Coming to Terms with an Evolved Mind (1999)
- A Reason For Everything: Natural Selection and the English Imagination (2004)
- Trust: Self-Interest and the Common Good (2008)
- Turned Out Nice: How the British Isles will Change as the World Heats Up (2010)
- A Guide for the Incurably Curious (2012)
- Four Words for Friend: Why Using More Than One Language Matters Now More Than Ever (2019)
- The Stories Old Towns Tell: A Journey Through Cities at the Heart of Europe (2023)
