= Hilaire Belloc bibliography =

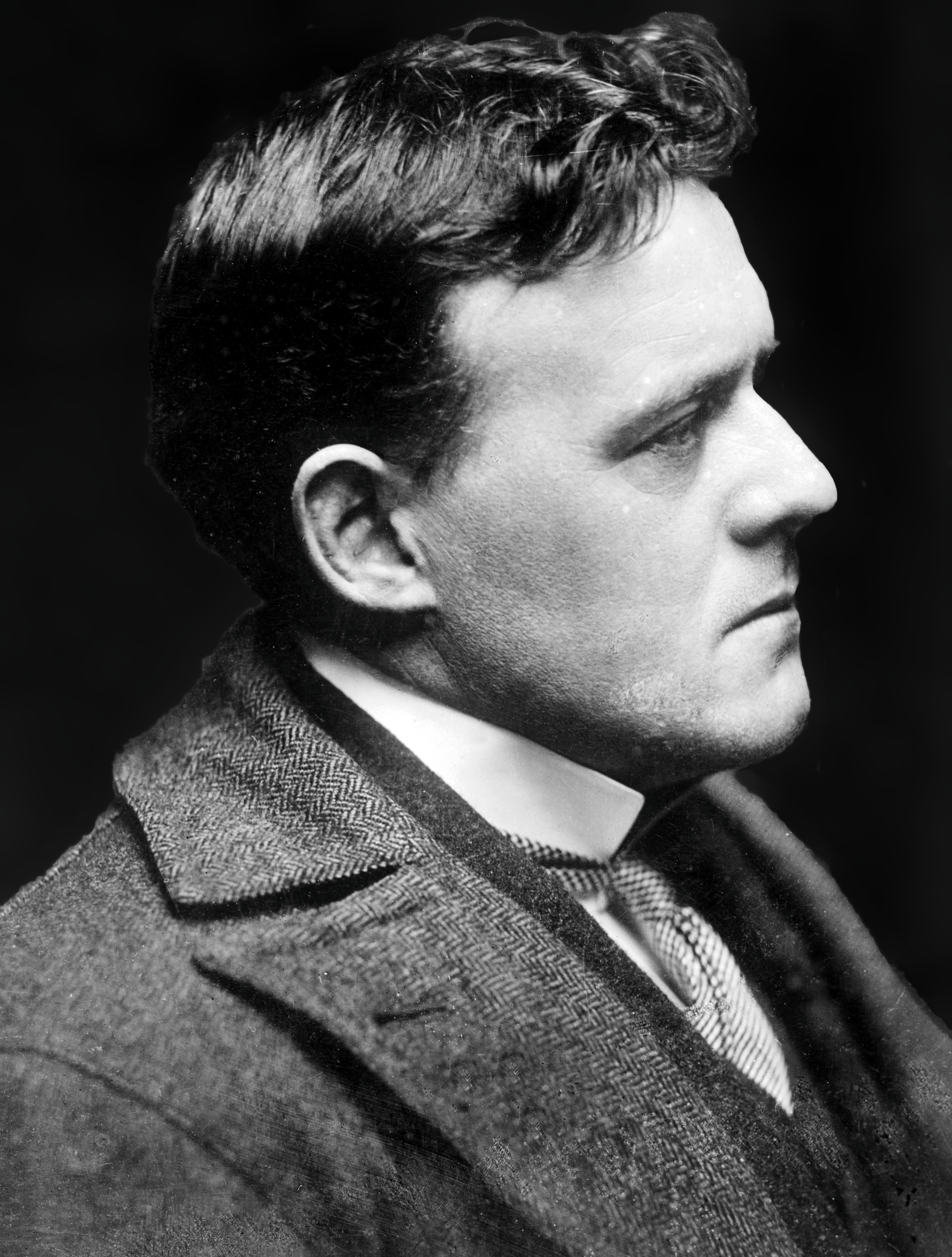
Belloc in 1910

This is a chronological bibliography of books (with a few pamphlets) and a general bibliography of articles by the author Hilaire Belloc. His books of verse went through many different editions, and are not comprehensively covered.

== To 1909 ==
- Verses and Sonnets, poems (London: Ward and Downey, 1896).
- The Bad Child's Book of Beasts (The Camelot Press Limited, 1896) poems, Basil Temple Blackwood (B.T.B.) illustrator
- More Beasts for Worse Children (1897) poems, B. T. B. illustrator
- The Modern Traveller (1898) poems, B. T. B. illustrator
- Danton: A Study (New York: Charles Scribner's Sons, 1899)
- Paris, Its Sites, Monuments and History with Maria Hornor Lansdale (Philadelphia: John C. Winston Company, 1898)
- A Moral Alphabet (1899) poems, B. T. B. illustrator
- Paris (1900)
- Lambkin's Remains (1900)
- Robespierre (London: Nisbet, 1901)
- The Path to Rome (London: Longmans, Green & Co., 1902) non-fiction (a travel book with numerous digressions and personal vignettes) (Note: Belloc walked from Toul, France in Lorraine over the mountains into Italy to make a pilgrimage to the Vatican.)
- The Great Inquiry; faithfully reported by Hilaire Belloc and ornamented with sharp cuts drawn on the spot by G. K. Chesterton (London: Duckworth, 1903)
- Caliban's Guide to Letters, or: The Aftermath; or, Gleanings from a busy life. Called upon the outer cover, for purposes of sale, Caliban's Guide to Letters, etc. (Humorous sketches.) (London: Duckworth, 1903)
- The Romance of Tristan and Iseult (London: George Allen, 1913) translation of Joseph Bédier's 1900 work
- Emmanuel Burden, Merchant (London: Methuen, 1904) novel
- Avril: Essays on the French Renaissance (London: Duckworth, 1904) criticism
- The Old Road: from Canterbury to Winchester (London: A. Constable, 1905)
- Hills and the Sea (London: Methuen, 1906)
- Sussex (London: A. & C. Black, 1906) illustrations by Wilfrid Ball
- Esto Perpetua: Algerian Studies and Impressions (London: Duckworth, 1906) travel
- Cautionary Tales for Children (London: Eveleigh Nash, 1907) poems, B. T. B. illustrator
- The Historic Thames (London: J. M. Dent & Sons, 1907)
- Mr. Clutterbuck's Election (1908) novel
- On Nothing and Kindred Subjects (London: Methuen, 1908) essays
- On Everything (1909) essays
- The Eye-Witness (London: Eveleigh Nash, 1908)
- A Change in the Cabinet (London: Methuen, 1909) novel
- Marie Antoinette (London: Methuen, 1909) non-fiction
- The Pyrenees (1909)

== 1910 – 1919 ==
- Pongo and the Bull (London: Constable, 1910) novel
- Catholicism and Socialism: Second Series (London: Catholic Truth Society, 1910) essays, with Joseph Rickaby and others
- On Anything (1910) essays
- On Something (London: Methuen, 1910; New York : E.P. Dutton, 1911) essays
- Verses (1910)
- The Party System (London: Stephen Swift, 1911) non-fiction (with Cecil Chesterton)
- More Peers (London: Stephen Swift, 1911) poems, B. T. B. illustrator
- The Four Men: A Farrago (London: Thomas Nelson & Sons, 1911) novel
- The French Revolution (New York: Henry Holt and Company, 1911; London: Williams & Norgate, 1914) non-fiction
- The Girondin (London: Thomas Nelson and Sons, 1911) novel
- First and Last (London: Methuen, 1911) essays
- British Battles (London, Stephen Swift & Co.; Hugh Rees, 1911–1913): Blenheim (1911) Turcoing (1912), Crécy (1912), Waterloo (1912), Malplaquet, Poitiers (1913); as Six British Battles (London: Arrowsmith, 1931; 1951)
- The Servile State (London and Edinburgh: T.N. Foulis, 1912) politics/economics
- The Green Overcoat (Bristol: J. W. Arrowsmith: 1912) novel
- The River of London (London: T.N. Foulis, 1912) with "illustrations reproduced from oil paintings by John Muirhead"
- This and That and the Other (1912) essays
- The History of England, from the First Invasion by the Romans to the Accession of William and Mary in 1688 (New York: The Catholic Publication Society, 1912) with John Lingard, 11 volumes, and later versions in the 1920s
- Warfare in England (London: Williams & Norgate, 1912)
- The Stane Street: a monograph (London:Constable, 1913) illustrated by William Hyde
- The Book of the Bayeux Tapestry (London: Chatto & Windus, 1914)
- Land & Water [...] The World's War : Special Articles by Hilaire Belloc, A. H. Pollen &c. &c. (London: The County Gentleman Publishing Co., 1914- ) magazine (multiple volumes), also in hard covers
- The Two Maps of Europe, and Other Aspects of the Great War (London: C. Arthur Pearson, 1915) non-fiction
- A General Sketch of the European War, the First Phase (London: Thomas Nelson & Sons, 1915)
- A Picked Company, being a selection from the writings of H. Belloc (London: Methuen, 1915), ed. E. V. Lucas
- At the Sign of the Lion (1916) essays (US)
- The Last Days of the French Monarchy (London: Chapman & Hall, 1916)
- A General Sketch of the European War, the Second Phase (Paris: Thomas Nelson & Sons, 1916, Nelson's Continental Library)
- The Free Press (1918)

== 1920 – 1929 ==
- Europe and the Faith (London: Constable, 1920) non-fiction
- The House of Commons and Monarchy (London: George Allen & Unwin, 1920)
- The Jews (London: Constable, 1922) later editions 1928, 1937
- The Mercy of Allah (London: Chatto & Windus, 1922)
- The Road (Hobson Press, 1923)
- The Contrast (London: J. W. Arrowsmith, 1923) i.e. the contrast between Europeans and Americans
- On (1923) essays
- Economics for Helen (London: J. W. Arrowsmith, 1924) distributism (Note: Marketed in the United States as Economics For Young People)
- The Cruise of the Nona (Boston: Houghton, Mifflin, 1925)
- This and That and the Other (1925) essays
- Mr. Petre (1925) novel, with 22 drawings by G. K. Chesterton
- The French Revolution (1925)
- Miniatures of French History (London: Thomas Nelson & Sons, 1925)
- Napoleon's Campaign of 1812 and the Retreat from Moscow (New York and London: Harper & Bros., 1926)
- A Companion to Mr. Wells's "Outline of History" (London: Sheed and Ward, 1926)
- Mr. Belloc Still Objects (London: Sheed & Ward, 1926)
- The Catholic Church and History (New York: Macmillan, 1926)
- Short Talks with the Dead and Others (London: The Cayme Press, 1926; Oxford: Basil Blackwell, 1926)
- The Emerald of Catherine the Great (London: Arrowsmith, 1926; New York: Harper, 1926) with 21 drawings by G. K. Chesterton
- Essays of Today and Yesterday (1926)
- Mrs. Markham's New History of England being an Introduction for Young People to the Current History and Institutions of Our Time (Kensington, London: The Cayme Press, 1926) illustrations by Hester Sainsbury
- The Highway and its Vehicles (London: Studio Ltd., 1926) edited by Geoffrey Holme
- Augustan Books of Modern Poetry: Hilaire Belloc (London: Ernest Benn, n.d. but c. 1926)
- The Catholic Church and History (London: Burns, Oates & Washbourne, and New York: Macmillan, 1926; The Calvert Series, series editor: Hilaire Belloc)
- Oliver Cromwell (London: Duckworth, 1927) non-fiction
- The Haunted House (London: Arrowsmith, 1927) novel, with drawings by G. K. Chesterton
- Towns of Destiny (New York: Robert M. McBride & Co., 1927)
- Do We Agree?: A Debate Between G. K. Chesterton and Bernard Shaw, with Hilaire Belloc in the Chair (London: Cecil Palmer, 1928)
- Many Cities (London: Constable, 1928) travel
- M. Wells et Dieu. Des poèmes et des essais (Paris: Plon, 1928, Collection Roseau d'or) with Maurice Beerblock, A. Beucler, Pierre Colle, Elie Gothchaux, Robert Honnert, Georges Hugnet, Mercédès de Gournay, Max Jacob, Jean de Menasce, Eugenio d'Ors, Paul Sabon
- James II (1928) non-fiction
- But Soft - We Are Observed! (London, Arrowsmith, 1928) novel (Shadowed! US)
- How the Reformation Happened (London: Jonathan Cape, 1928)
- Belinda: A Tale of Affection in Youth and Age (Life and Letters, 1928) novel
- A Conversation with an Angel: and Other Essays (London: Jonathan Cape, 1928)
- The Chanty of the Nona (London: Faber and Gwyer, 1928) Ariel Poems, #9
- The Missing Masterpiece (London: Arrowsmith, 1929) novel with 41 drawings by G. K. Chesterton
- Richelieu: A Study (Philadelphia: J. B. Lippincott Company, 1929) non-fiction
- Survivals and New Arrivals: The Old and New Enemies of the Catholic Church (London: Sheed & Ward, 1929) non-fiction
- Joan of Arc (London: Cassell, 1929)

== 1930 – 1939 ==
- The Man Who Made Gold (London: Arrowsmith, 1930) novel
- Wolsey (London: Cassell, 1930) non-fiction
- New Cautionary Tales (London: Duckworth, 1930) poems, pictures by Nicolas Bentley
- Essays of a Catholic Layman in England (London: Sheed & Ward, 1931)
- A Conversation with a Cat: and others (London: Cassell, 1931)
- Cranmer (London: Cassell, 1931) non-fiction
- On Translation: the Taylorian Lecture, 1931 (Oxford: Clarendon Press, 1931)
- One Hundred and One Ballades (London: Cobden-Sanderson, 1931) with E. C. Bentley, G. K. Chesterton, C.K. Scott-Moncrieff, Winifred Agar, Sidney Allnutt, Maurice Baring, Cecil Chesterton, Geoffrey Howard, Diggory King, and H. S. Mackintosh
- Nine Nines or Novenas from a Chinese Litany of Odd Numbers (Oxford: Basil Blackwell, 1931), illustrations by Thomas Derrick
- Napoleon (1932) non-fiction
- The Postmaster-General (London: Arrowsmith, 1932; Philadelphia: J. B. Lippincott, 1932) novel, drawings by G. K. Chesterton
- Saulieu of the Morvan (New York: Ludowici-Celadon, 1932, The Tuileries Brochures series)
- The Question and the Answer (New York: Bruce Publishing Co., 1932, Science and Culture Series)
- Ladies and Gentlemen: For Adults Only and Mature at That (London: Duckworth, 1932) verses, pictures by Nicolas Bentley
- An Heroic Poem in Praise of Wine (London: Peter Davies, 1932)
- Charles the First, King of England (London: Cassell, 1933)
- William the Conqueror (London: Peter Davies, 1933)
- The Tactics and Strategy of the Great Duke of Marlborough (London: Arrowsmith, 1933)
- How We Got The Bible (London: Catholic Truth Society, 1934) pamphlet
- A Shorter History of England (New York: Macmillan, 1934)
- Milton (1935) non-fiction
- Hilaire Belloc (London: Methuen, 1935, Methuen's Library of Humour, edited by E. V. Knox)
- Characters of the Reformation (London: Sheed & Ward, 1936) non-fiction, portraits by Jean Charlot
- The Restoration of Property (London: The Distributist League, 1936) non-fiction
- The Hedge and the Horse (London: Cassell, 1936) with illustrations by G. K. Chesterton
- The Battleground: Syria and Palestine, The Seedplot of Religion (Philadelphia: J. B. Lippincott, 1936)
- The County of Sussex (London: Cassell, 1936)
- The Crisis Of Our Civilisation (London: Cassell, 1937) non-fiction
- The Crusades: The World's Debate (Milwaukee: Bruce Publishing Co., 1937)
- An Essay on the Nature of Contemporary England (London: Constable, 1937; New York: Sheed & Ward, 1937) (cover title of U.S. edition: What England Really Is)
- Stories, Essays, Poems (1938) edited by Ernest Rhys
- Monarchy: A Study of Louis XIV (London: Cassell, 1938)
- Return to the Baltic (London: Constable, 1938)
- The Great Heresies (London: Sheed & Ward, 1938)
- The Church and Socialism (London: Catholic Truth Society, 1934) reprint of undated first edition of 1909
- The Case of Dr. Coulton (London: Sheed & Ward, 1938)
- On Sailing the Sea: A Collection of Seagoing Writings (1939) selected by W. N. Roughead

== 1940 – 1953 ==
- The Last Rally: A Story of Charles II (London: Cassell, 1940) non-fiction
- On the Place of Gilbert Chesterton in English Letters (1940); Spanish translation: Un gran escritor ingles G.K. Chesterton (Buenos Aires: La espiga de oro, 1942)
- The Catholic and the War (London: Burns, Oates, 1940)
- The Silence Of The Sea and Other Essays (London: Cassell, 1941)
- Elizabethan Commentary: Creature of Circumstance (New York: Harper & Brothers, 1942)
- Places (New York: Sheed & Ward, 1942)
- Sonnets and Verse (New York: Sheed & Ward, 1944)
- The Romance of Tristan and Iseult by Joseph Bedier (New York: Doubleday, 1945) translated by Belloc and Paul Rosenfeld
- Selected Essays of Hilaire Belloc (London: Methuen, 1948) edited by J. B. Morton
- The Alternative: An Article Originally Written During Mr. Belloc's Parliamentary Days, For "St. George's Review" and Since Revised (London: Distributist Books, c. 1950) distributist pamphlet, original version published under title: An Examination of Socialism
- Hilaire Belloc: An Anthology of his Prose and Verse (London: Rupert Hart-Davis, 1951) selected by W. N. Roughead
- World Conflict (London: Catholic Truth Society, 1951) booklet
- Songs of the South Country (London: G. Duckworth, 1951) selected poems

== Posthumous ==
- Belloc Essays (London: Methuen, 1955) edited by Anthony Forster
- The Verse of Hilaire Belloc (London: Nonesuch Press, 1954) edited W. N. Roughead
- One Thing and Another. A Miscellany from his Uncollected Essays selected by Patrick Cahill (London: Hollis & Carter, 1955)
- Collected Verse (Harmondsworth: Penguin, 1958, Penguin Poets series, 44) with an introduction, etc. by Ronald Knox
- Letters From Hilaire Belloc (London: Hollis & Carter, 1958) selected by Robert Speaight
- Advice (London: Harvill Press, 1960) Hilaire Belloc's advice on wine, food and other matters
- Complete Verse, including Sonnets and Verse, Cautionary Verses, the Modern Traveller (London: Duckworth, 1970)
- Belloc: A Biographical Anthology (London: Allen & Unwin, 1970) edited by Herbert Van Thal and Jane Soames Nickerson
- Hilaire Belloc's Prefaces, Written for Fellow Authors (Chicago: Loyala University Press, 1971) editor J. A. De Chantigny
- Distributist Perspectives: Essays On Economics of Justice and Charity (Norfolk, VA: IHS Press, 2003–2004) with Herbert W. Shove, George Maxwell, G. K. Chesterton, Arthur J. Penty, H. J. Massingham, Eric Gill, and Harold Robbins
- Cautionary Tales for Children (New York: Harcourt, Inc., 2002) illustrated by Edward Gorey
- The Way Out (Catholic Authors Press, 2006) introduction by Robert Phillips

== Articles ==
- "A Last Word on Calderon," The Irish Monthly, Vol. 19, No. 219, Sep. 1891.
- "A Conscript's View of the French Army," The Contemporary Review, Vol. LXIII, June 1893.
- "The Liberal Tradition." In Essays in Liberalism, Cassell & Company, 1897.
- "'Democracy and Liberty' Reviewed," The Catholic World, Vol. LXVI, October 1897/March 1898.
- "The Historian," The Living Age, Vol. IX, October/December 1900.
- "The Sea-Fight of Ushant," Scribner's, Vol. XXXIV, No. 2, August 1903.
- "The Cambridge History of the French Revolution," The Bookman, Vol. XXVI, No. 156, September 1904.
- "The Protectionist Movement in England," The International Quarterly, Vol. X, October 1904/January 1905.
- "The Young Napoleon," The Bookman, Vol. XXVIII, No. 166, July 1905.
- "Napoleon II," The Bookman, Vol. XXIX, No. 170, November 1905.
- "Catholics and the Education Bill" 1906.
- "Ten Pages of Taine," The International Quarterly, Vol. XII, October 1905/January 1906.
- "Contemporary France," The Bookman, Vol. XXIX, No. 173, February 1906.
- "Thoughts About Modern Thought," The New Age, Vol. II, No. 6, 7 December 1907.
- "Limits of Direct Taxation," The Contemporary Review, Vol. XCIII, February 1908.
- "Not a Reply," The New Age, Vol. II, No. 15, 8 February 1908.
- "A Question," The New Age, Vol. II, No. 21, 21 March 1908.
- "The Inflation of Assessment," The Dublin Review, Vol. CXLII, No. 284-285, January/April 1908.
- "The Recess and the Congo," The New Age, Vol. III, No. 15, 8 August 1908.
- "The Taxation of Rent," The Dublin Review, Vol. CXLV, No. 290-291, July/October 1909.
- "The International. I. The Ferrer Case," The Dublin Review, Vol. CXLVI, No. 292-293, January/April 1910.
- "The International. II. The Motive Case," The Dublin Review, Vol. CXLVI, No. 292-293, January/April 1910.
- "The French Revolution," as part of "The Home University Library of Modern Knowledge," Henry Holt and Company, 1911
- "Lord Acton on the French Revolution," The Nineteenth Century and After, Vol. LXIX, January/June 1911.
- "The Economics of 'Cheap'," The Dublin Review, Vol. CXLVIII, No. 296-297, January/April 1911.
- "The Catholic Conscience of History," The Catholic World, Vol. XCII, October 1910/March 1911.
- "What was the Roman Empire?," The Catholic World, Vol. XCII, October 1910/March 1911.
- "What was the Church in the Roman Empire?," The Catholic World, Vol. XCII, October 1910/March 1911.
- "What was the 'Fall' of the Roman Empire?," The Catholic World, Vol. XCII, October 1910/March 1911.
- "The Beginnings of the Nations," The Catholic World, Vol. XCII, October 1910/March 1911.
- "What Happened in Britain," Part II, The Catholic World, Vol. XCIII, April/September 1911.
- "The Middle Ages," The Catholic World, Vol. XCIII, April/September 1911.
- "The Dark Ages," The Catholic World, Vol. XCIII, No. 556, April/September 1911.
- "On a Method of Writing History," The Dublin Review, Vol. CXLIX, No. 298-299, July/October 1911.
- "Catholicism and History," The Dublin Review, Vol. CXLIX, No. 298-299, July/October 1911.
- "What was the Reformation?," Part II, The Catholic World, Vol. XCIV, October 1911/March 1912.
- "The Results of the Reformation," Part II, The Catholic World, Vol. XCIV, October 1911/March 1912.
- "The Entry Into the Dark Ages," The Dublin Review, Vol. CL, No. 300-301, January/April 1912.
- "On a Very Special Calling," The Century Magazine, Vol. LXXXIV, No. 1, May 1912.
- "The Fairy Omnibus," The Century Magazine, Vol. LXXXIV, No. 3, July 1912.
- "On the Secret of Diplomatic Success," The Century Magazine, Vol. LXXXIV, No°. 6, October 1912.
- "The Servile State," Everyman, Vol. I, No. 7, 29 November 1912.
- "On a Great Wind." In A Century of Great Essays, J. M. Dent & Sons, 1913.
- "Should Lloyd George Imitate Napoleon?," Everyman, Vol. I, No. 23, 21 March 1913.
- "The Battle of Waterloo," Everyman, Vol. II, No. 27, 18 April 1913.
- "Professor Bury's History of Freedom of Thought," The Dublin Review, Vol. CLIV, No. 308-309, January/April 1914.
- "The Church and French Democracy," Part II, Part III, Part IV, Part V, The Catholic World, Vol. XCVIII, October 1913/March 1914; Part VI, Vol. XCIX, April/September 1914.
- "The Modern French Temper," The Dublin Review, Vol. CLV, No. 310-311, July/October 1914.
- The Historic Thames, Wayfarers Library, J.M. Dent & Sons, 1914.
- "The Geography of the War," The Geographical Journal, Vol. 45, No. 1, Jan. 1915.
- "High Lights of the French Revolution," The Century Magazine, Vol. LXXXVIII, No. 5, September 1914; Part II, No. 6, October 1914; Part III, Vol. LXXXIX, No. 2, December 1914; Part IV, N°. 4, February 1915; Part V, N°. 6, April 1915.
- "The Economics of War," The Dublin Review, Vol. CLVI, No. 312-313, January/April 1915.
- "Certain Social Tendencies of the War," The New Age, Vol. XIX, No. 8, 1916, pp. 174–175.
- "A Page of Gibbon," The Dublin Review, Vol. CLIX, No. 314-315, July/October 1916.
- "The Re-creation of Property," The New Age, Vol. XX, No. 6, 1916, pp. 125–127.
- "The Present Position and Power of the Press," The New Age, Vol. XX, No. 7, 1916, pp. 150–151.
- "The Present Position and Power of the Press," The New Age, Vol. XX, No. 8, 1916, pp. 173–175.
- "The Present Position and Power of the Press," The New Age, Vol. XX, No. 9, 1916, pp. 197–199.
- "The Present Position and Power of the Press," The New Age, Vol. XX, No. 10, 1917, pp. 221–222.
- "The Press," The New Age, Vol. XX, No. 10, 1917, p. 237.
- "The Present Position and Power of the Press," The New Age, Vol. XX, No. 11, 1917, pp. 245–246.
- "The Present Position and Power of the Press," The New Age, Vol. XX, No. 12, 1917, pp. 271–272.
- "The Present Position and Power of the Press," The New Age, Vol. XX, No. 13, 1917, p. 294.
- "The Present Position and Power of the Press," The New Age, Vol. XX, No. 14, 1917, pp. 317–318.
- "A Landmark," The New Age, Vol. XX, No. 22, 1917, pp. 509–510.
- "Socialism and the Servile State," The Catholic World, Vol. CV, April/September 1917.
- "The Priest," The Catholic World, Vol. CV, April/September 1917.
- "A Preface to Gibbon," Studies: An Irish Quarterly Review, Vol. 6, No. 24, Dec. 1917.
- "A Political Survey," Land & Water, Vol. LXX, No. 2904, January 1918.
- "The Prime Minister's Speech," Land & Water, Vol. LXX, No. 2905, January 1918.
- "The New State in Europe," Part III; Part IV, Land and Water, No. 2909, February 1918.
- "Enemy Reinforcement," Land and Water, Vol. LXX, No. 2910, February 1918.
- "The Meaning of Ukraine," Land and Water, Vol. LXX, No. 2911, February 1918.
- "German War Medals," Land and Water, Vol. LXX, No. 2911, February 1918.
- "The Public Mood," Land and Water, Vol. LXX, No. 2912, February 1918.
- "The German Offer," Land and Water, Vol. LXX, No. 2913, March 1918.
- "East and West," Land and Water, Vol. LXX, No. 2914, March 1918.
- "The Great Battle," Land and Water, Vol. LXX, No. 2916, March 1918; Part II, Vol. LXXI, No. 2917, April 1918.
- "The Continued Battle," Land and Water, Vol. LXXI, No. 2918, April 1918.
- "Battle of the Lys," Land and Water, Vol. LXXI, No. 2919, April 1918.
- "The American Effort," Land and Water, Vol. LXXI, No. 2921, May 1918.
- "The Delay and the Attack," Land and Water, Vol. LXXI, No. 2925, May 1918.
- "Battle of the Tardenois," Land and Water, Vol. LXXI, No. 2926, June 1918.
- "Battle of the Matz," Land and Water, Vol. LXXI, No. 2929, June 1918.
- "The Distributist State," Part II, The Catholic World, Vol. CVI, October 1917/March 1918.
- "Gibbon and the True Cross," Studies: An Irish Quarterly Review, Vol. 7, No. 26, Jun. 1918.
- "Gibbon and the Temporal Power," Studies: An Irish Quarterly Review, Vol. 7, No. 27, Sep. 1918.
- "On the Word 'Christianity'," The Catholic World, Vol. CVII, April/September 1918.
- "State Arbitration in Peril." In The Limits of State Industrial Control, J. M. Dent & Son Ltd., 1919.
- "The Recovery of Europe," The Lotus Magazine, Vol. 10, No. 1, Jan. 1919; Part II, Vol. 10, No. 2, February 1919.
- "A Visit to Strassburg," The Living Age, Vol. XIV, No. 693, April 1919.
- "Vanished Towns," The Living Age, Vol. 14, No. 709, May 1919.
- "Paris and London – A Study in Contrasts," The Living Age, September 1919.
- "Three British Criticisms of Ludendorff," The Living Age, November 1919.
- "Gibbon and Julian the Apostate," Studies: An Irish Quarterly Review, Vol. 8, No. 32, Dec. 1919.
- "An Essay on Controversy," The Living Age, March 1920.
- "Cursing the Climate," The Living Age, March 1920.
- "The House of Commons," The New Age, Vol. XXVI, No. 12, 1920, pp. 183–184.
- "The House of Commons: II," The New Age, Vol. XXVI, No. 13, 1920, pp. 197–199.
- "The House of Commons: III," The New Age, Vol. XXVI, No. 14, 1920, pp. 216–218.
- "The House of Commons: IV," The New Age, Vol. XXVI, No. 15, 1920, pp. 233–235.
- "The House of Commons: V," The New Age, Vol. XXVI, No. 16, 1920, pp. 249–250.
- "The House of Commons: VI," The New Age, Vol. XXVI, No. 17, 1920, pp. 265–267.
- "The House of Commons: VIII," The New Age, Vol. XXVI, No. 18, 1920, pp. 285–287.
- "The House of Commons: IX," The New Age, Vol. XXVI, No. 20, 1920, pp. 316–318.
- "The House of Commons: X," The New Age, Vol. XXVI, No. 21, 1920, pp. 333–335.
- "The House of Commons: XI," The New Age, Vol. XXVI, No. 22, 1920, pp. 348–340.
- "The House of Commons: XII," The New Age, Vol. XXVI, No. 23, 1920, pp. 364–365.
- "The House of Commons: XIII," The New Age, Vol. XXVI, No. 24, 1920, pp. 380–383.
- "The House of Commons: XIV," The New Age, Vol. XXVII, No. 2, 1920, pp. 21–24.
- "The Led," The New Age, Vol. XXVII, No. 4, 1920, pp. 52–53.
- "An Example," The New Age, Vol. XXVII, No. 9, 1920, pp. 133–134.
- "On Accent," The Living Age, June 1920.
- "An Analysis of the 'Lettres Provinciales'," Studies: An Irish Quarterly Review, Vol. 9, No. 35, Sep. 1920.
- "Madame Tussaud and Her Famous Waxworks," The Living Age, September 1920.
- "On Progress," Studies: An Irish Quarterly Review, Vol. 9, No. 36, Dec. 1920.
- "The Mowing of a Field." In Modern Essays, Harcourt, Brace & Company. New York, 1921.
- "The Death of St. Martin," The Living Age, February 1921.
- "Dante the Monarchist," The Catholic World, Vol. CXIII, September 1921.
- "On Foreign Affairs," The New Age, Vol. XXIX, No. 22, 1921, pp. 257–258.
- "On Foreign Affairs: II," The New Age, Vol. XXIX, No. 23, 1921, pp. 268–269.
- "On Foreign Affairs: III," The New Age, Vol. XXIX, No. 24, 1921, pp. 279–280.
- "On Foreign Affairs: IV," The New Age, Vol. XXIX, No. 25, 1921, pp. 291–293.
- "Question and Answer," The New Age, Vol. XXIX, No. 26, 1921, p. 304.
- "Gibbon and the Ebionites," The Dublin Review, Vol. CLXIX, No. 339, October/December 1921.
- "On the Approach of an Awful Doom." In Modern English Essays, J. M. Dent & Sons. London, 1922.
- "On a Unknown Country." In Modern English Essays, J. M. Dent & Sons. London, 1922.
- "On Kind Hearts Being More Than Coronets," The Living Age, July 1922.
- "Al Wasal, or the Merger," The Living Age, Vol. CCCXV, No. 4093, 16 December 1922.
- "The Jews," 1922.
- "The American Alliance," The Living Age, June 1923.
- "On the Cathedral at Seville and 'The Misantrophe'," The Bookman, Vol. LVIII, No. 4, December 1923.
- "Hoko and Moko," The Living Age, February 1924.
- "A Catholic View of Religious America," The Century Magazine, April 1924.
- "Wash Day – British and American Style," The Outlook, April 1924.
- "A Pedestrian in Spain," The Living Age, November 1924.
- "Gibbon and the First Council of Ephesus," Studies: An Irish Quarterly Review, Vol. 13, No. 51, Sep. 1924; Part II, Vol. 13, No. 52, Dec. 1924.
- "Nordic or Not?," The Living Age, April 1925.
- "A Chinese Litany of Odd Numbers," The Living Age, June 1925.
- "Mrs. Piozzi's Rasselas," The Saturday Review, Vol. II, No. 3, August 1925.
- "The Reproof of Gluttony," The Forum, Vol. LXXVI, No. 3, September 1926.
- "Vathek," The Saturday Review, Vol. IV, No. 12, October 1927.
- "A Remaining Christmas"
- "Carlyle's French Revolution." In Modern Essays, Selected by Norman G. Brett-James, Dutton, 1930.
- "The Peril to Letters," The Living Age, January 1930.
- "Advice to a Young Man," The Living Age, March 1930.
- "Mark My Words!," The Saturday Review, Vol. VII, No. 34, March 1931.
- "On Translation," The Living Age, September/October 1931.
- "Machine versus Man," The Living Age, June 1932.
- "Britain's Secret Policy," The Living Age, December 1932.
- "The Restoration of Property," The American Review, April–November 1933.
- "Man and the Machine." In Science in the Changing World, George Allen & Unwin Ltd., 1933.
- "Science and Religion," The American Review, Vol. II, No. 4, February 1934.
- "Parliament and Monarchy," The American Review, Vol. II, No. 5, March 1934.
- "Dimnet and the French Mind," The Saturday Review, Vol. XI, No. 36, March 1935.
- "Gilbert Keith Chesterton," The Saturday Review, Vol. XVI, No. 10, July 1936.
- "G. K. Chesterton and Modern England," Studies: An Irish Quarterly Review, Vol. 25, No. 99, Sep. 1936.
- "The New League," The American Review, Vol. VIII, No. 1, November 1936.
- "A Letter to Bernard Shaw," The American Review, Vol. VIII, No. 3, January 1937.
- "English Monarchy," The American Review, Vol. VIII, No. 4, February 1937.
- "Two Texts," The American Review, Vol. IX, No. 1, April 1937.
- "Neither Capitalism Nor Socialism," The American Mercury, Vol. XLI, No. 163, July 1937.
- "The Way Out," Social Justice, February 1938.
- "The Problem Stated," Social Justice, March 1938.
- "The Wage Worker," Social Justice, March 1938.
- "Insufficiency and Insecurity," Social Justice, March 1938.
- "Ruin of the Small Owner," Social Justice, March 1938.
- "Ruin of the Small Store Keeper," Social Justice, April 1938.
- "The Proletarian Mind," Social Justice, April 1938.
- "Usury," Social Justice, April 1938.
- "The Disease of Monopoly," Social Justice, April 1938.
- "Capitalism Kills Its Own Market," Social Justice, May 1938.
- "The Suppressed Truth," Social Justice, May 1938.
- "The End Is Slavery," Social Justice, May 1938.
- "The Way Out," Social Justice, June 1938.
- "Communism – the Theory," Social Justice, June 1938.
- "Communism Is Wicked," Social Justice, June 1938.
- "Communism Has Failed," Social Justice, June 1938.
- "Property," Social Justice, July 1938.
- "Secured Capitalism," Social Justice, July 1938.
- "The Way Out," Social Justice, July 1938.
- "The Way Out: The Differential Tax," Social Justice, July 1938.
- "The Way Out: The Guild System," Social Justice, August 1938.
- "The Way Out: The Small Producer," Social Justice, August 1938.
- "The Small Distributor," Social Justice, August 1938.
- "The Way Out: The Functions of the State," Social Justice, August 1938.
- "The Way Out: Summary and Conclusion," Social Justice, August 1938.
- "Prussia Not Hitler Must Perish," The Living Age, January 1940.
- "An English Need," The Irish Monthly, Vol. 68, No. 804, Jun. 1940.
- "Hitler Loses Round One," The Living Age, December 1940.

=== Miscellany ===
- James Anthony Froude, Essays in Literature and History, with an introduction by Hilaire Belloc, J.M. Dent & Sons, 1906.
- Thomas Carlyle, The French Revolution: A History, with an introduction by Hilaire Belloc, J.M. Dent & Sons, 1906.
- Johannes Jörgensen, Lourdes, with a preface by Hilaire Belloc, Longmans, Green & Co., 1914.
- Hoffman Nickerson, The Inquisition, with a preface by Hilaire Belloc, John Bale, Sons & Danielsson Ltd., 1923.
- P. G. Wodehouse, (ed.), "On Conversations in Trains." In A Century of Humour, Hutchinson & Co., 1934.
- Brian Magee, The English Recusants, with an introduction by Hilaire Belloc, Burns Oates & Washbourne Ltd., 1938.
- C. John McCloskey, (ed.), The Essential Belloc: A Prophet for Our Times, Saint Benedict Press, 2010.
