= The Epiplectic Bicycle =

1969 book by Edward Gorey

- 1969 dust jacket
- Author: Edward Gorey
- Illustrator: Edward Gorey
- Language: English
- Genre: Literary nonsense
- Publisher: Dodd, Mead & Co.
- Publication date: 1969
- Publication place: United States
- Media type: Print (Hardcover)
- Pages: 64
- OCLC: 30530

The Epiplectic Bicycle (Note: The title uses the word epiplectic, not epileptic, an adjective derived from epiplexis. Reviewer J. D. O'Hara traced the term to the Oxford English Dictionary, which defines epiplexis as a figure "which endeavors to convince by a kind of upbraiding".) is a 1969 book written and illustrated by American author Edward Gorey, first published by Dodd, Mead & Co. The story follows two children who take a strange ride on a bicycle that steers itself. When first published, reviewers commented on the book's spare text and Gorey's draftsmanship. Gorey once told biographer Alexander Theroux it was a favorite among his own books.

== Synopsis ==
On "the day after Tuesday and the day before Wednesday", an autonomous bicycle carries Embley and Yewbert, a brother and sister, across empty flatlands, past turnip fields and "a lengthy puddle". Atypically for Gorey, the characters have dialogue. The book ends with the children pondering their own mortality, triggered by an obelisk "raised to their memory 173 years ago".

== Publication history ==
The Epiplectic Bicycle was first published in 1969 by Dodd, Mead & Co., and priced at $3 (equivalent to $26 in 2025). It was later republished by Congdon & Weed in 1983, Harcourt Brace in 1997, and by Bloomsbury in the UK in 1999.

The book was translated into German by Urs Widmer as Das epiplektische Fahrrad (Diogenes, 1981), into French by Patrick Mauriès as La bicyclette épileptique (Note: Unlike the German and Italian titles, which translate to Gorey's epiplectic, the French title translates to "The Epileptic Bicycle".) (Le Promeneur, 1994), and into Italian as La bicicletta epiplettica (Adelphi, 2005). A second German translation, by Clemens J. Setz, was published by Lilienfeld Verlag in 2026.

== Reception ==
In his 2018 biography of Gorey, Mark Dery described The Epiplectic Bicycle as nonsense, mixing "slapstick, head-scratching non sequiturs, and mock moral instruction", and found Gorey's cartoonish illustrations fitting for the material. He raised questions about whether the bicycle ride represents the journey of life and whether the children are ghosts who never learned they had died. He called the book "hopped up and cartoony" in comparison to Gorey's other 1969 book, The Iron Tonic.

In a contemporaneous review for The Washington Post, J. D. O'Hara called it "classy Gorey" but judged The Deranged Cousins the superior work. He likened Gorey's verse to that of Dr. Seuss, "if Dr. Seuss were mad and vaguely homicidal", and described Gorey's narrative voice as that of a "cultured Edwardian uncle" telling a ghost story. O'Hara noted that the narration runs to only eleven sentences and explains little.

San Francisco Examiner called it a work of "vague Victorian surrealism" where nothing of interest happens along the way. It quoted Gorey's own mock-grand description of it as "an intrepid voyage of epic proportion with a hero unequaled in the annals of literature", described the protagonists as "two loathsome children", and called the book "delightful, instructive and peculiar".

In Harper's Magazine, John Hollander found the book's "louche, stunted" siblings instantly recognizable as Gorey children, drawn against the stark empty white that Gorey began using in The Curious Sofa. He praised Gorey's precise writing, citing the book's line "they rapidly ate a quantity of berries", and observed that Gorey's drawing had grown from being a "parodic adaptation of nineteenth-century wood engraving" into his own, distinctive visual style.

== Adaptations ==
The Japanese company Puppet Theatre Hitomi-za adapted The Epiplectic Bicycle with another Gorey picture book, The Hapless Child, into a puppet play titled The Bicycle. The production was staged in 2008 at the Hong Kong Cultural Centre as part of the International Arts Carnival.

A 2010 stop-motion adaptation by Lauren Horoszewski was screened at the 2019 International Cycling Film Festival.
