= Pomegranate (publisher) =

Publishing and printing company

Pomegranate Communications
- Founded: 1968
- Founder: Thomas F. Burke
- Country of origin: United States
- Headquarters location: Portland, Oregon
- Publication types: Books, gift products
- Nonfiction topics: Art
- Official website: pomegranate.com

Pomegranate Communications is a publishing and printing company formerly based in Petaluma, California, having moved to Portland, Oregon in 2013. The company, founded by Thomas F. Burke, began by publishing works of psychedelic art from San Francisco in 1968 under the name ThoFra Distributors. It distributed posters for concerts at Avalon Ballroom and The Fillmore.

Anchored in visual arts, Pomegranate was active in book publishing in the past as well, especially during the 1990s. Adjustments in that sector caused it to reduce involvement accordingly. Currently calendars - long a mainstay - remain a strong part of their catalog, along with coloring books for all ages, nature books and puzzles.

In its current form, Pomegranate is best described as a museum publisher, collaborating with institutions such as the National Gallery of Art, the Library of Congress, the British Library, the Smithsonian Museum of American Art, the Sierra Club, the Frank Lloyd Wright Foundation, and the Museum of Fine Arts, Boston. It is the licensee for artists M. C. Escher, Edward Gorey, Charley Harper, Wolf Kahn, Georgia O'Keeffe, and Gustave Baumann. Its monograph by Elizabeth Murray - Monet’s Passion has been reprinted extensively, and Irene Hardwicke Olivieri's Closer to Wildness has thrived.

== Selected publications ==
- Visions, introduction by Walter Hopps (1977) ISBN 978-0-917556-00-5, with works by Cliff McReynolds, Bill Martin, Thomas Akawie and Gage Taylor.
- The Fantod Pack: Interpreted by Madame Groeda Weyrd, 2007 ISBN 978-0-7649-4224-2, by Edward Gorey
- The Addams Family: An Evilution, 2010 ISBN 978-0-7649-5388-0, by H. Kevin Miserocchi, with works by Charles Addams (illustrator)
