= Clemens J. Setz =

Austrian writer and translator

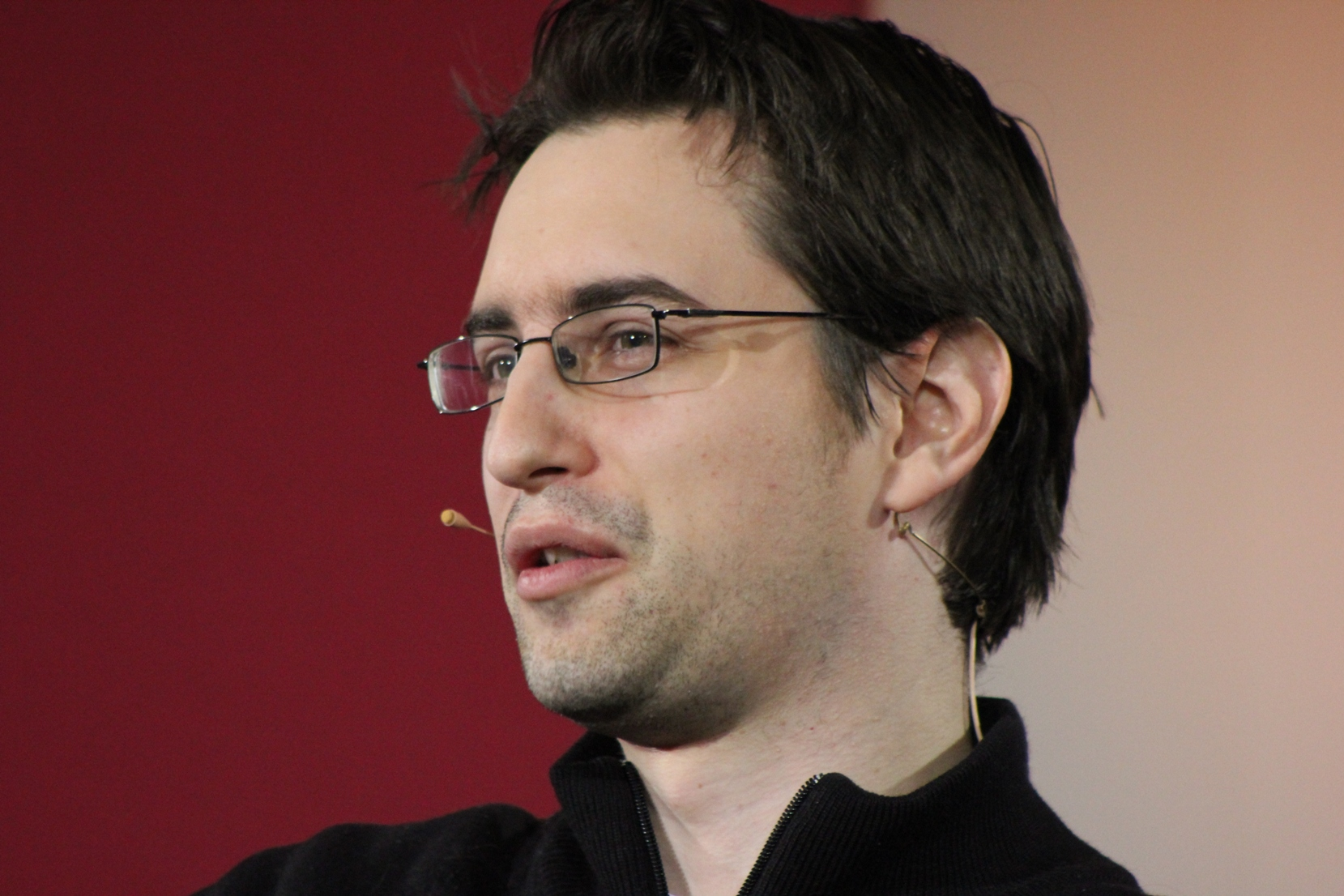
Setz in 2012

Clemens J. Setz (born 15 November 1982, in Graz) is an Austrian writer and translator.

He debuted in 2007 with the novel Söhne und Planeten. His second novel, Die Frequenzen, was shortlisted for the German Book Prize. He won the 2011 Leipzig Book Fair Prize for the short story collection Die Liebe zur Zeit des Mahlstädter Kindes. In 2012 he was again shortlisted for the German Book Prize for the novel Indigo, and in 2015 he received the Wilhelm Raabe Literature Prize for Die Stunde zwischen Frau und Gitarre.

He published literature translations into German of John Leake (Entering Hades), Edward Gorey (The Utter Zoo; The Hapless Child; The Osbick Bird; The Epiplectic Bicycle) and Scott McClanahan (Sarah).

In 2020 he was awarded the Jakob-Wassermann-Literaturpreis and the prestigious Kleist Prize, in 2021 the Georg Büchner Prize.

Clemens J. Setz lives and works in Vienna.

== List of works ==
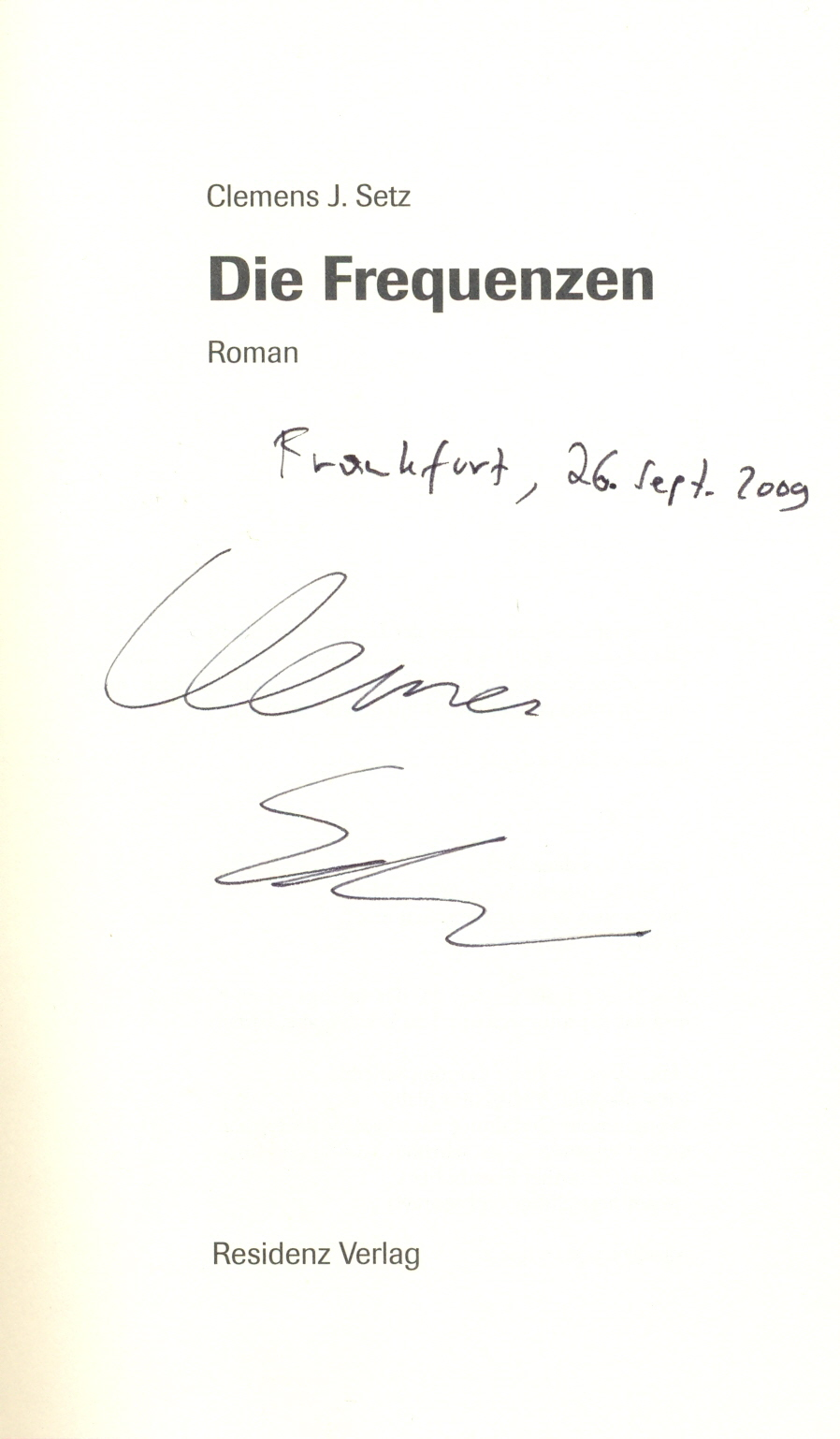
Autogramm

- Söhne und Planeten. Novel. Residenz, St. Pölten 2007. ISBN 978-3-7017-1484-1
- Die Frequenzen. Novel. Residenz, St. Pölten 2009. ISBN 978-3-7017-1515-2
- Die Liebe zur Zeit des Mahlstädter Kindes. Short stories. Suhrkamp, Berlin 2011. ISBN 978-3-518-42221-2
- Zeitfrauen. (Schöner Lesen Nr. 112.) SuKuLTuR, Berlin 2012. ISBN 978-3-941592-34-6
- Indigo. Novel. Suhrkamp, Berlin 2012. Published in English in 2014. ISBN 978-3-518-42324-0
- Die Vogelstraußtrompete. Poems. Suhrkamp, Berlin 2014. ISBN 978-3-518-42416-2
- Glücklich wie Blei im Getreide. Retellings. Suhrkamp, Berlin 2015. ISBN 978-3-518-46587-5
- Die Stunde zwischen Frau und Gitarre. Novel. Suhrkamp, Berlin 2015. ISBN 978-3-518-42495-7
- Verweilen unter schwebender Last. (Tübinger Poetik-Dozentur 2015, with Kathrin Passig), Essays, Lectures, Speeches. Swiridoff, Künzelsau 2016. ISBN 978-3-89929-336-4
- Der Trost runder Dinge. Short stories. Suhrkamp, Berlin 2019. ISBN 978-3-518-42852-8
- Die Bienen und das Unsichtbare, Suhrkamp, Berlin 2020. ISBN 978-3-518-42965-5
