= Cautionary Tales for Children =

1907 book by Hilaire Belloc

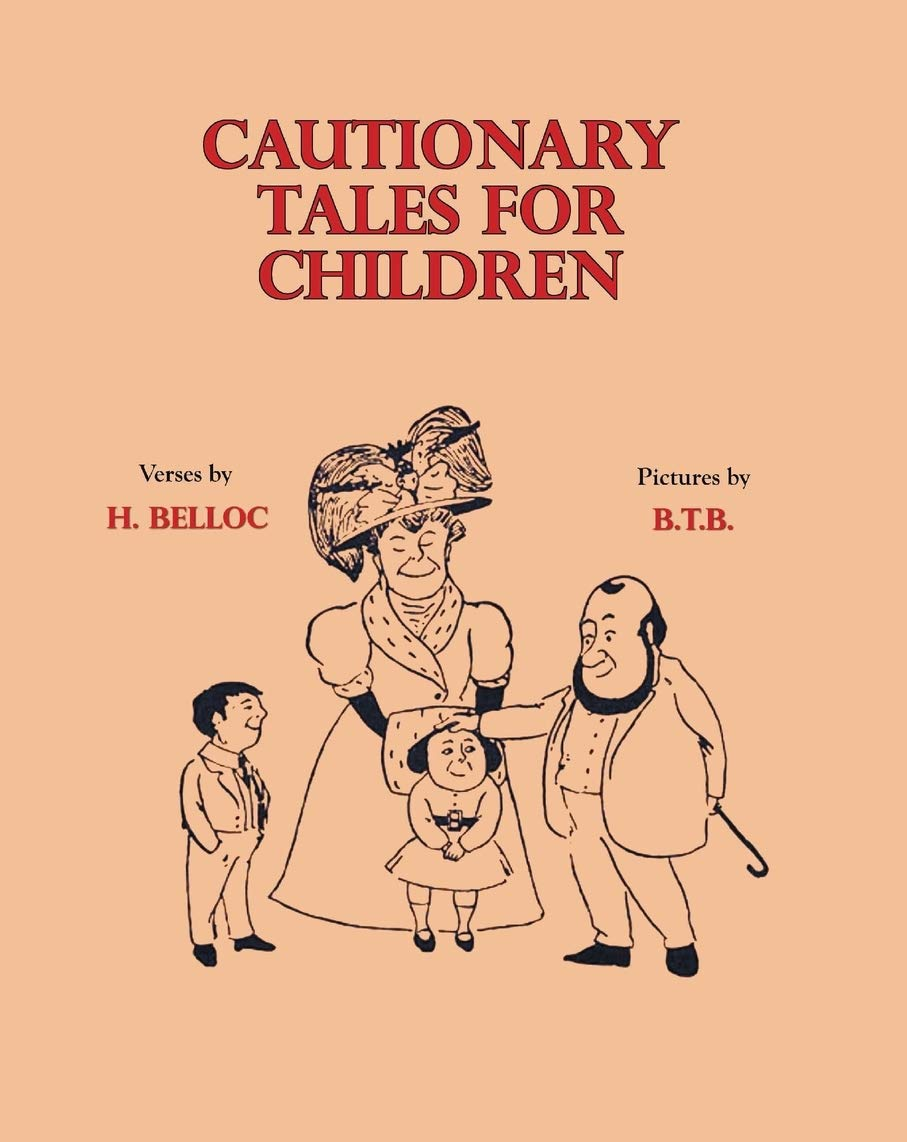
- Author: Hilaire Belloc
- Illustrator: Basil Temple Blackwood
- Language: English
- Genre: Children's literature
- Publisher: Eveleigh Nash
- Publication date: 1907
- Publication place: United Kingdom
- Followed by: New Cautionary Tales: Verses, Duckworth, 1930.

Cautionary Tales for Children: Designed for the Admonition of Children between the ages of eight and fourteen years is a 1907 children's book written by Hilaire Belloc. It is a parody of the cautionary tales that were popular in the 19th century. The poems are a sardonic critique of Victorian era upper class society. The work is in the public domain in the United States.

Illustrated by Belloc's friend from Oxford, Basil Temple Blackwood, it is similar in style to The Bad Child's Book of Beasts, which had brought Belloc public acclaim and commercial success a decade earlier. The book contains an introduction and eleven tales, all written in rhyming couplets.

- "Introduction: Upon being asked by a Reader whether the verses contained in this book were true."
- "Jim: Who ran away from his Nurse, and was eaten by a Lion."
- "Henry King: Who chewed bits of string, and was early cut off in Dreadful agonies."
- "Matilda: Who told Lies, and was Burned to Death."
- "Franklin Hyde: Who caroused in the Dirt and was corrected by His Uncle."
- "Godolphin Horne: Who was cursed with the Sin of Pride, and, Became a Boot-black."
- "Algernon: Who played with a Loaded Gun, and, on missing his Sister, was reprimanded by his Father."
- "Hildebrand: Who was frightened by a Passing Motor, and was brought to reason."
- "Lord Lundy: Who was too Freely Moved to Tears, and thereby ruined his Political Career."
- "Rebecca: Who Slammed Doors for Fun and Perished Miserably."
- "George: Who played with a Dangerous Toy, and suffered a Catastrophe of considerable Dimensions."
- "Charles Augustus Fortescue: Who Always Did what was Right, and so Accumulated an Immense Fortune."

Four of the Cautionary Tales were set to music by Liza Lehmann in 1909; the famous contralto Clara Butt sang the piece in a successful tour of Britain in the same year.

Caedmon Records released 'The Bab Ballads of WS Gilbert and Cautionary Verses of Hilaire Belloc', in 1959, on: Caedmon TC-1104. The 'Ballads' were read by Stanley Holloway; and the 'Tales', by Joyce Grenfell.

The British actor Stephen Fry recorded a selection of the verses as an audiobook in 1992, and the American artist Edward Gorey created 61 new illustrations for the book, which were published posthumously in 2002. Pink Floyd writer and singer Syd Barrett used the book as the basis for the lyrics of the song "Matilda Mother", however Barrett was forced to re-write the lyrics as Belloc's estate did not give permission for his poems to be used. The re-written version appeared on the 1967 album The Piper at the Gates of Dawn; the version with the Belloc lyrics was not officially released until 2007.

== See also ==
- The Gashlycrumb Tinies
- Grizzly Tales for Gruesome Kids
- Struwwelpeter
