= The Fantod Pack =

Card deck by Edward Gorey

"The Bundle", one of the 20 cards in The Fantod Pack, compared by biographer Mark Dery to Man Ray's 1920 work The Enigma of Isidore Ducasse

The Fantod Pack is a set of 20 illustrated divinatory cards created by American author and illustrator Edward Gorey, attributed to "Madame Groeda Weyrd", an anagram of his name.

Gorey began work on the cards in 1959, and they first appeared in Esquire in December 1966. An unauthorized edition followed in the late 1960s, and authorized editions in 1995 and 2007.

== Background ==
Gorey believed in "graphology, also palmistry, the I Ching, the tarot, astrology". Biographer Mark Dery noted that Gorey did not trust cards to predict the future; his interest in divination grew from his fascination with Taoism and surrealism. The Fantod Pack was not intended to be a serious divinatory tool.

== Description ==
In the Esquire feature, the pack is attributed to a fictional clairvoyant, Madame Groeda Weyrd, who is claimed to be the author of such works as Floating Tambourines and The Future Speaks Through Entrails (none of which really exist). The text claims the pack is "of incredible antiquity".

The imagery on the cards includes recurring motifs from Gorey's work: urns, men in fur coats, and ill-fated children. The back of each card depicts Figbash (a recurring Gorey character) on a unicycle, balancing a platter with a skull, a goblet, and a candle.

The word fantod means "state of worry or nervous anxiety, irritability", and each of the 20 cards predicts disaster. Each card is associated with a day of the week or a month, and carries a list of misfortunes, often using obscure vocabulary. For example, "The Child" shows a small skeleton playing with a toy animal; its associated misfortunes include "sexual inadequacy", "breakage", "loss of youth", and "catarrh". "The Feather" includes "blackmail", "loss of eyelashes", "delirium", and "a disagreeable letter". "The Plant" lists "tics", "misplaced confidence", and "worms". The cards' meanings are described as "selective rather than exhaustive, and hints rather than assertions", and the reader is told to rely on their own "imagination of disaster" to interpret the cards in combination.

The final card, known as "The Black Doll", is the only one without a printed title and has no month or list of afflictions. Its text reads: "In the words of the old rhyme: What most you fear / Is coming near."

== Usage ==
The instructions tell the user to stand in a sparsely furnished room, close their eyes, and toss the pack into the air, then select five cards and lay them out in a cross before reading them. Because the cards were first printed on magazine pages rather than as a standalone deck, the Esquire article instructed readers to cut them out and paste them onto cardboard.

== Publication history ==
The Fantod Pack first appeared in a December 1966 Esquire article titled "A Chthonian Christmas", in a section called "The Awful Vista of the Year".

A c. 1969 edition from the Owl Press, published as The Fantod Pack of Edward Gorey, reproduced the images from the Esquire feature without Gorey's involvement. The cards were printed in purple ink on fluorescent green cardstock and came with a yellow fold-out instruction sheet. A blue paper band held the pack together.

The first authorized edition was published by Manhattan's Gotham Book Mart in 1995.

In 2007, Pomegranate produced an authorized edition of laminated cards with a booklet reproducing the interpretive text from Esquire.

== Reception ==
Cynthia Rose compared "The Child" to a Max Beerbohm caricature of Aubrey Beardsley walking a dog. Dery interpreted "The Ancestor" card of a Victorian gentleman with a fur collar and a missing face as a possible reference to Gorey's relationship with his father. He compared "The Bundle", a package tied in rope, to Man Ray's 1920 surrealist work The Enigma of Isidore Ducasse, noting that while Man Ray's wrapped object conceals a known sewing machine, Gorey's contents remain permanently unknowable.

The Movable Book Society has argued that the pack functions as a kind of movable book: by combining the text associated with each card, "it is possible to achieve a story with more variations than Gorey claimed for The Helpless Doorknob".
