= Cliff McReynolds =

American painter

Cliff McReynolds is an American visionary painter from California. Active since the 1950s and popularly known from the 1970s on, his work has been seen in one man shows and group exhibits in New York City, Chicago, Washington, D.C., Minneapolis, Milwaukee, San Jose, San Francisco, Los Angeles, San Diego, Oslo, Norway, New Delhi, India, and Tokyo, Japan. Since 1976, Pomegranate Publications has produced and distributed his work worldwide on posters, prints, cards, calendars, books and as picture puzzles. He has been listed in Who's Who in American Art since 1978.

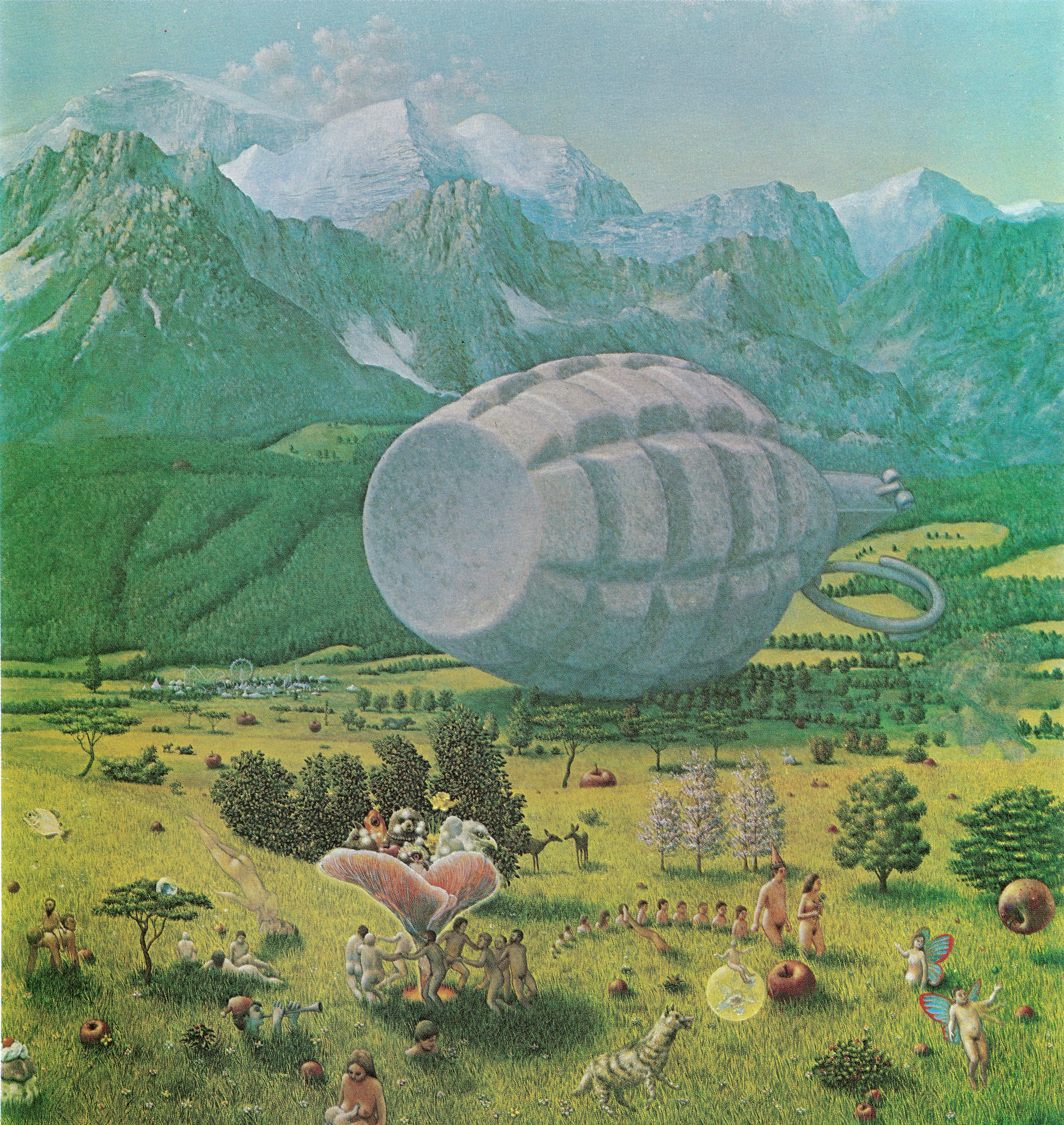
"Landscape With Hand Grenade" by Cliff McReynolds

== Bibliography ==
- Visions, introduction by Walter Hopps (Pomegranate, 1977) ISBN 0-917556-00-3, including works by Bill Martin, Thomas Akawie and Gage Taylor.
- Revelation Art: All Things New by Cliff McReynolds (Pomegranate, 1980) ISBN 9780917556043.
- Art Now: Give My Liberty or Give Me License by Cliff McReynolds ("Hill Courier", February, 1985).
- Wonders of the Visible World by Cliff McReynolds ("In Critique of America" February, 1988).
- State of the Arts by Dr. Gene Veith (Crossway Books, 1991).
- Making Art and Eating Too by Cliff McReynolds ("The Forum" 1993).
- The Truest Lie; Cliff McReynolds, Skewed Perspectives by Karen L. Mulder ("Inklings" Magazine, June 1998).
