= Lithuanian Typewriter =

Lithuanian Typewriter may refer to:

- A fictional sexual activity in The Curious Sofa by Edward Gorey
- Keyboard layouts used for the Lithuanian language: see List of QWERTY keyboard language variants#Lithuanian and Keyboard layout#ĄŽERTY (Lithuanian)
