= The Gashlycrumb Tinies =

1963 alphabet book by Edward Gorey

- Author: Edward Gorey
- Illustrator: Edward Gorey
- Cover artist: Edward Gorey
- Language: English
- Series: The Vinegar Works
- Genre: Alphabet book
- Published: 1963
- Publisher: Simon & Schuster
- Publication place: United States
- Media type: Print (hardcover)
- OCLC: 908411515

The Gashlycrumb Tinies: or, After the Outing is an alphabet book written by Edward Gorey that was first published in 1963 as the first of a collection of short stories called The Vinegar Works, the eleventh work by Gorey. The book tells the tale of 26 children (each representing a letter of the alphabet) and their untimely deaths. It is one of Edward Gorey's best-known books and is the most notorious amongst his roughly half-dozen mock alphabets. It has been described as a "sarcastic rebellion against a view of childhood that is sunny, idyllic, and instructive". The morbid humor of the book comes in part from the mundane ways in which the children in the story die, such as falling down the stairs or choking on a peach. Far from illustrating the dramatic and fantastical childhood nightmares, these scenarios instead poke fun at the banal paranoias that come as a part of parenting.

Gorey has stated the book to be inspired by "those 19th-century cautionary tales, I guess, though my book is punishment without misbehavior".

== Description ==
The book tells of the deaths of twenty-six children in thirteen rhyming dactylic couplets, accompanied by the author's distinctive black-and-white illustrations. The book incorporates several elements common to alphabet books, such as naming each child in the book after a letter in the English alphabet and including illustrations for each entry. It describes the cause of death for each child, such as being set on fire, run over by a train or attacked by wild animals.

== Legacy ==
While reading The Gashlycrumb Tinies, Sue Grafton was inspired to write a series of crime novels with titles each starting with a letter of the alphabet. The first novel was "A" Is for Alibi and the final novel before her death was "Y" Is for Yesterday.

In December 2018, satire magazine Mad ran a parody titled "The Ghastlygun Tinies" by Marc Palm and Matt Cohen. The subject is a parody of "The Gashlycrumb Tinies" themed around a school shooting. Palm and Cohen were nominated for an Eisner Award for the publication.

== See also ==
- Cautionary Tales for Children
- A Series of Unfortunate Events
