= The Vinegar Works: Three Volumes of Moral Instruction =

Book by Edward Gorey

- Cover of first edition (hardcover)
- Author: Edward Gorey
- Language: English
- Genre: Literary nonsense, Gothic fiction, Picture books
- Publisher: Simon & Schuster
- Publication date: 1963
- Publication place: United States
- Media type: Print (Hardcover & Paperback)
- Preceded by: The Beastly Baby
- Followed by: The Wuggly Ump

The Vinegar Works: Three Volumes of Moral Instruction is a set of three heavily illustrated books by Edward Gorey that was sold as a set encased in an illustrated slip-case. It was first published by Simon and Schuster in 1963. It was Gorey's eleventh work.

The books included in the set are: The Gashlycrumb Tinies, The Insect God, and The West Wing. The set was written with the intention to "instruct, appall and amuse", in the Gothic fiction tradition.

The Vinegar Works and its three constituent books can be found in the first of the four collections comprising Gorey's work, Amphigorey: Fifteen Books (1972).

== Books ==
The Gashlycrumb Tinies (possibly Gorey's most famous work) is an abecedarium, or inscription of the English alphabet. It is stylised as a poem describing the deaths of 26 children, with the initials of their first names corresponding with each consecutive letter of the alphabet. (For instance, "A is for Amy who fell down the stairs." and "D is for Desmond thrown out of a sleigh.") The book's instructive quality is in teaching the alphabet using a mnemonic device.

The Insect God is the only book in the collection with a clear-cut narrative. It follows a little girl who is alone outside and is abducted by anthropomorphic insects in a black motorcar, who then whisk her away and present her to the "Insect God" as a human sacrifice. The story is meant as a warning against strangers.

The West Wing is harder to explain than its predecessors in the collection. It contains no clear "instruction" for anything. Besides an inscription of the name "the west wing" above a door, the book has no words. It is a numbered sequence of images from a possibly haunted building. Some of the images are mundane, like doors opening onto a hallway, and others ghostlier. These images create a moody, unsettled atmosphere.

== Inspiration ==
It has been said that The West Wing was written in response to literary critic Edmund Wilson, to whom it is dedicated. Wilson wrote letters to Gorey complaining that his pictures were a lot more impressive than his text. Hence, Gorey gave him a book to review that had no text.

== Title ==
"The Vinegar Works" was first introduced in The Willowdale Handcar: Or, the Return of the Black Doll, published the previous year, in which the three main characters, travelling by handcar, come across the institution in their travels, after it has been ruined by an unexplained disaster.
