= The Object-Lesson =

1958 picture book by Edward Gorey

- Cover of first edition (hardcover)
- Author: Edward Gorey
- Language: English
- Genre: Literary nonsense
- Publisher: Doubleday
- Publication date: 1958
- Publication place: United States
- Media type: Print (Hardcover & Paperback)
- Pages: 30 pp
- ISBN: 978-0-15-100709-7

The Object-Lesson (1958) is a picture book by Edward Gorey. A work of surrealist art and literature, it is typical of Gorey's avant-garde style of storytelling, with Victorian and Edwardian-esque line drawings and settings, each described with a sentence fragment which adds to a larger continuous narrative. The pictures and text combine to tell a strange and obscure story. Although internally consistent, coherent, and structured, the story has a disjointed and disorienting quality, with melancholic and morbidly humorous effects.

The book is collected in Gorey's first compilation, Amphigorey.

== Title ==
Object lessons were a teaching method popular in the Victorian era, where an example of a physical object is used when teaching facts and speculation about that class of object.

== Story ==
The story begins with a search for an aristocrat's artificial limb, a search that, implicitly, has endured for days by this point. Another man then leaves the house and gives "the Throbblefoot Spectre" a length of string, before going to the statue of "Corrupted Endeavour" to wait for autumn. After this, the story stays outside the house, and we see several characters enacting their own obscure dramas (including a woman who throws herself from a parapet, and three people in a dinghy on a lake to whom Echo (not depicted) speaks), in a panoramic and seemingly endless rural landscape.

The story ends as three people visit a "kiosk" (depicted much like a bandstand) for tea and cakes. The tea urn, however, is empty, save for a card on which is written the book's last word: "Farewell". (In the last picture, the three stand facing a setting sun.)

== Adaptations ==
In 1976 jazz composer Michael Mantler released the album The Hapless Child (Watt/ECM) with Robert Wyatt, Terje Rypdal, Carla Bley, and Jack DeJohnette, containing a musical adaptation of The Object Lesson and six other Gorey stories. The track has been described as "a recitative laid on an extraordinary altar of guitar, bass, and drums".
