= Peter Neumeyer =

German-born American academic (1929–2026)

Peter F. Neumeyer
- Born: August 4, 1929; Munich, Bavaria, Germany
- Died: April 2, 2026 (aged 96)
- Education: University of California, Berkeley (B.A. 1951; M.A. 1955; Ph.D. 1963)
- Occupation: Literary scholar · Children's literature specialist · Poet · Educator
- Years active: 1955–2004
- Organizations: Harvard University; SUNY Stony Brook; West Virginia University; San Diego State University
- Known for: Pioneering academic children’s literature courses; extensive scholarship on E. B. White, Edward Gorey, Kafka studies
- Notable work: The Annotated Charlotte’s Web (1994); collaborated with Edward Gorey on *Donald and the ...*; Floating Worlds: The Letters of Edward Gorey & Peter F. Neumeyer (2011)
- Spouse: Helen Snell Neumeyer
- Children: Three

Peter Florian Neumeyer (August 4, 1929 – April 2, 2026) was a German-born American academic, literary scholar, poet and children's literature expert. He is best known for his contributions to the study of children's literature, his extensive writings on authors such as E.B. White and Franz Kafka, and his collaboration with illustrator Edward Gorey.

== Early life and education ==
Peter Florian Neumeyer was born in Munich, Bavaria, Germany on August 4, 1929. His father, Alfred Neumeyer, was an art historian, and his mother came from a family who owned textile mills. In 1936, he and his family emigrated to the United States, fleeing the Nazi persecution of Jews. He pursued his higher education at the University of California, Berkeley, where he earned his undergraduate degree in 1951, master's degree in 1955, and, in 1963, a doctorate in English.

== Academic career ==
Neumeyer began his academic career at Harvard University, where he taught until 1969. At Harvard, he created one of the first literary courses on children's books in North America. He later held teaching positions at the State University of New York, Stony Brook and West Virginia University. Additionally, he taught summer courses on children's literature at Columbia University and lectured in Sweden and Finland.

In 1978, Neumeyer joined the faculty at San Diego State University (SDSU), where he developed what became the largest children's literature program in North America. He retired from SDSU in 1993.

== Research and scholarship ==
Neumeyer published extensively on children's literature, particularly on the works of E.B. White, including The Annotated Charlotte's Web. His scholarly work also includes studies on Franz Kafka, Tove Jansson, Richard Kennedy, and Randall Jarrell.

Beyond academia, he collaborated with Edward Gorey on the Donald and the... series of children's books. In addition to his scholarly contributions, Neumeyer was a poet, with numerous poems published in literary journals. Following his retirement, he became a reviewer of children's books, writing for publications such as Prodigy, Mothering Magazine, Parent's Choice, San Diego Home and Garden, and the Los Angeles Times.

== Personal life and death ==
Neumeyer was married to the editor and writer Helen Snell Neumeyer, and had three children. He later lived in Santa Rosa, California.

Neumeyer died on April 2, 2026, at the age of 96.

== Awards and recognition ==
In 2005, Neumeyer received the Children's Literature Association's Anne Deveraux Jordan Award in recognition of his significant contributions to the field of children's literature.

== Publications ==
- Donald and the .... (Capra Press, 1969). ISBN 9780884962038 (with Edward Gorey)
- Why We Have Day and Night. (Young Scott Books, 1970). ISBN 9780764958861 (with Edward Gorey)
- The Faithful Fish. (Young Scott Books, 1971). ISBN 9780824000004 (with Edward Gorey)
- Homage to John Clare : A Poetical and Critical Correspondence. (Peregrine Smith, 1980). ISBN 9780879050566
- The Phantom of the Opera (Peregrine Smith, 1980). ISBN 9780879053307
- The Annotated Charlotte's Web. (HarperCollins Publishers, 1994). ISBN 9780060243876
- Donald has a Difficulty. (Harry N. Abrams, 2004). ISBN 9780810948358 (with Edward Gorey)
- Floating Worlds : The letters of Edward Gorey & Peter F. Neumeyer. (Pomegranate Press, 2011). ISBN 9780764959479 (with Edward Gorey)
