= Bill Martin (artist) =

American painter

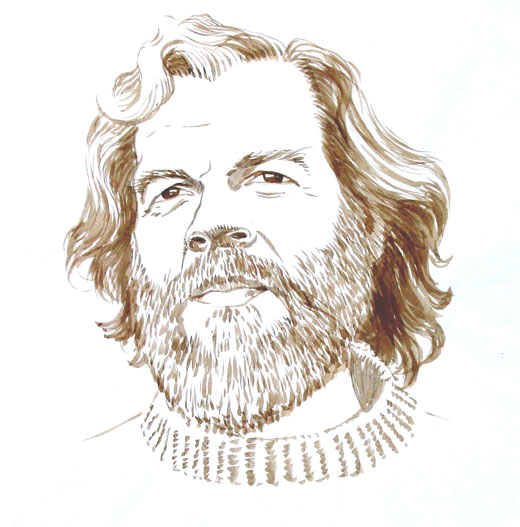
- Self portrait

Bill Martin (January 22, 1943, South San Francisco, California — October 28, 2008, Stanford, California, age 65) was a realist and visionary artist. "Bill Martin's images possess an inexplicable compelling power," wrote Walter Hopps, the Smithsonian Institution's Curator of the 20th Century American Art Collection.

== Career ==
Martin's work has been shown at the New York Museum of Modern Art, the Solomon R. Guggenheim Museum, the Smithsonian, the Whitney Museum in New York, the Biennale de Paris, the Art Institute of Chicago and the San Francisco Museum of Modern Art (where he was at the center of the popular Baja exhibition). Martin began his career in the San Francisco Bay Area and lived much of his life in Mendocino, California.

== Legacy ==
The distinguished art critic Thomas Albright reviewed Martin's work in Rolling Stone, writing:

The landscapes Martin does are the kinds of paintings it takes months — sometimes even a year — to finish: an exacting craftsman, and perfectionistic taskmaster, he will spend weeks on a painting that may seem already near completion to a less exacting eye…. Martin’s specialty is circular, tondo-shaped canvases filled with a profusion of plants, trees, animals, cascades and freshets, painted in bright, vivid colors and with the meticulous precision of medieval illumination or Persian miniature art. More so than any other contemporary visionary, his paintings fulfill the pre-Raphaelite ideal of nature seen through "eyes without lids."

Albright continued that Martin's art "seems to carry nature worship and ideal of Adamic man that found expression not only in Pre-Rafaelite art, but also in the Hudson River and Rocky Mountain schools of American landscape painting, and particularly in the transcendental allegories of Thomas Cole." Martin himself acknowledged the influence of the Hudson River School masters in his work: "They were doing what I wanted to do. I was impressed by the scale of their paintings and their ability to create depth and luminescence. I didn’t want to just paint pretty pictures. I was looking for something more." Martin later described the motivation behind his work: "There seem to be two distinct but compatible directions in my art. The first is concerned with the depiction of imagined realities. The other is the depiction of perceived realities. By observing the existing subjects that I am drawn to paint I find new underlying currents in my own subconscious. Thus in my art I explore the conscious, subconscious, and the intercommunication between."

San Francisco Chronicle art critic Kenneth Baker wrote that Martin had "one artistic foot in Surrealism and the other in the tradition of light-soaked 19th century American landscape painting," practicing "a representational style so fastidious that everything he paints takes on a preternatural clarity." Martin often painted on round or semicircular canvases, about which Baker wrote:

The half tondo format gives his picture spaces a dome-like curvature that makes them feel to the eye like complete worlds. Although perhaps only Photo-Realism can compare to Martin's paintings in their degree of finish, his work has nothing to do with the camera. It manifests an intensity of imagination we all wish we could summon at times…. His half-tondo images are obsessive declarations of love for painting's capacity to objectify — and exaggerate — sensations of space and light.

Whitney Museum curator Robert Doty wrote that Martin's work creates "visions of Arcadian splendor, meticulously rendered landscapes which suggest a nostalgia for Eden and the availability of peace and joy through an expanded awareness of the beauty inherent in the land." Stephen Prokopoff, director of the Museum of Contemporary Art in Chicago, said, "Bill Martin paints allegories that center upon our earth as a site for generation, for the continuing process of change and renewal…". In the introduction to Lost Legends, Michael Babcock wrote:

Martin takes powerful, ancient images with a life all their own and presents them so that they seem new again and again. Looking at a piece drawn from Martin's imagination, we find it startlingly familiar, as if it existed in our own mind before he drew it out and put it on canvas.

Artweek's David Clark estimated that Martin's reproductions (and those of his contemporary Gage Taylor), "are on millions of walls throughout the western world."

== Education ==
Martin earned his bachelor's degree and masters in fine arts at the San Francisco Art Institute. Martin later taught at the Art Institute, as well as the University of California, Berkeley, Academy of Art College, San Jose State University and College of the Redwoods.

== Bibliography ==
- Paintings: 1969-1979 (Pomegranate Books, 1979) ISBN 0517538962
- The Joy of Drawing (Watson-Guptill, 1993) ISBN 1422366022
- Lost Legends (Pomegranate Books, 1995) ISBN 0876544839
- Visions, introduction by Walter Hopps (Pomegranate Books, 1977) ISBN 0-917556-00-3, including works by Bill Martin, Cliff McReynolds, Gage Taylor and Thomas Akawie.
- Art in the San Francisco Bay Area, 1945-1980: An Illustrated History, Thomas Albright. University of California Press, 1985, page 178 ISBN 0520051939
