= The Headless Bust =

1999 book by Edward Gorey

- First edition
- Author: Edward Gorey
- Original title: The Headless Bust: A Melancholy Meditation on the False Millennium
- Illustrator: Edward Gorey
- Cover artist: Edward Gorey
- Language: English
- Published: 1999
- Publisher: Harcourt Brace & Company
- Publication place: United States
- Media type: Print (hardcover)
- ISBN: 978-0-15-100514-7
- Preceded by: The Haunted Tea Cozy

The Headless Bust: A Melancholy Meditation on the False Millennium is an illustrated book by American author/illustrator Edward Gorey, and is a sequel to his The Haunted Tea-Cosy dedicated to the memory of Lancelot Brown. The story features the Bahhumbug throughout its 30 illustrated panels colored in black, white, brown, yellow and light blue. In rhyming verse it explores the baffling human condition, leaving the characters as well as the reader with more questions than answers.
