= The Doubtful Guest =

1957 book by Edward Gorey

- Author: Edward Gorey
- Illustrator: Edward Gorey
- Cover artist: Edward Gorey
- Language: English
- Publisher: Doubleday
- Publication date: 1957
- Publication place: United States
- Media type: Print (hardcover)
- OCLC: 1943473

The Doubtful Guest is a short, illustrated book by Edward Gorey, first published by Doubleday in 1957. It is the third of Gorey's books and shares with his others a sense of the absurd, meticulous cross-hatching, and a seemingly Edwardian setting. The book begins with the sudden appearance of a strange, penguin-like creature in a turn-of-the-century manor house. An aristocratic family struggles to coexist with the creature, who is by turns despondent and mischievous. By the final page, the guest has stayed for seventeen years, and shows "no intention of going away".

== Description ==
Like Gorey's other works, The Doubtful Guest follows the traditions of surrealism and nonsense verse. It contains fourteen pages, each with an image and a rhyming couplet. Gorey began sketches and notes for The Doubtful Guest around 1955, referring to the story as "A Peculiar Visitor". The title eventually became "The Visit", and finally "The Doubtful Guest". Gorey claimed the book was intended for children, although Doubleday declined to release it as a children's book.

== Reception ==
Edmund Wilson, in the 1959 New Yorker article that first introduced Gorey to a wide readership, wrote that The Doubtful Guest was the first of Gorey's books to give a full picture of "the morbid Edwardian household". Wilson described the "black-bearded, towering" head of the family, the Master, whose authority comes into conflict with the visiting creature, "a kind of flat-headed bird, with short legs and penguin wings". The conflict, however, is never resolved: "there is no outcome to the story of the Doubtful Guest".

== Legacy ==
In 1976, Michael Mantler included a musical version of The Doubtful Guest on his avant-garde album The Hapless Child and Other Inscrutable Stories, with Robert Wyatt singing the lead vocal. In 2008, the Hoipolloi theatre company adapted The Doubtful Guest for the stage, performing first at the Watford Palace Theatre. The Guardian called the production "childlike, but not childish".
