= Mark Dery =

American journalist (born 1959)

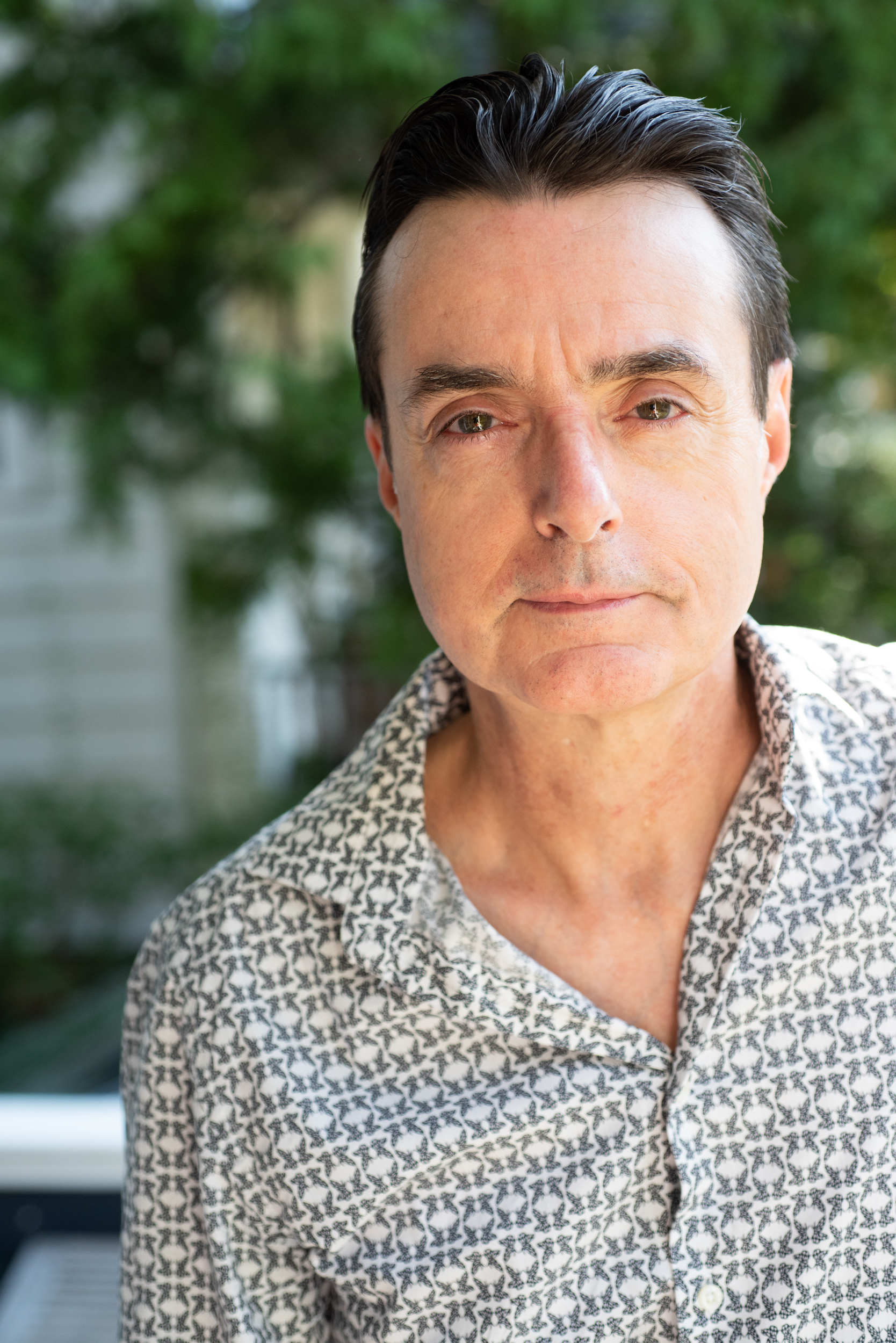
- Dery in 2018
- Born: December 24, 1959 (age 66); Braintree, Massachusetts
- Occupations: Cultural critic, freelance journalist, lecturer
- Website: www.markdery.com

Mark Dery (born December 24, 1959) is an American author, editor, lecturer and cultural critic. An early observer and critic of online culture, Dery helped to popularise the term "culture jamming". He coined the term "Afrofuturism" in his essay "Black to the Future", later reprinted in the anthology Flame Wars: The Discourse of Cyberculture. Dery writes about media and visual culture, especially fringe elements of culture for a wide variety of publications, including The New York Times, Wired, Rolling Stone and BoingBoing.

== Early life ==
Dery was born in Boston, Massachusetts. He grew up in Chula Vista, California. He earned a B.A. from Occidental College in 1982. He is of Anglo-Irish-Scottish descent with some distant French ancestry.

== Teaching ==
From 2001 to 2009, Dery taught media criticism, literary journalism, and the essay in the Department of Journalism at New York University.

In January 2000, he was appointed Chancellor's Distinguished Fellow at the University of California, Irvine. In the summer of 2009, he was a scholar in residence at the American Academy in Rome, Italy. In 2017, he taught "Dark Aesthetics" (the Gothic, the Grotesque, the Uncanny, the Abject, and other transgressive aesthetics) at Yale University.

== Writing career ==
An early contributor to the study of cyberculture and the cultural effects of the digital age, Dery has written for The New York Times Magazine, The Atlantic Monthly, The Washington Post, Lingua Franca, The Village Voice, Rolling Stone, Spin, Wired, Salon.com, BoingBoing, and Cabinet, among other publications. Dery’s books include monographs such as Escape Velocity: Cyberculture at the End of the Century (1996) as well as the edited anthology Flame Wars: The Discourse of Cyberculture (1994) and a collection of essays, I Must Not Think Bad Thoughts: Drive-By Essays on American Dread, American Dreams (2012). Both Escape Velocity and I Must Not Think Bad Thoughts have been translated into other languages.

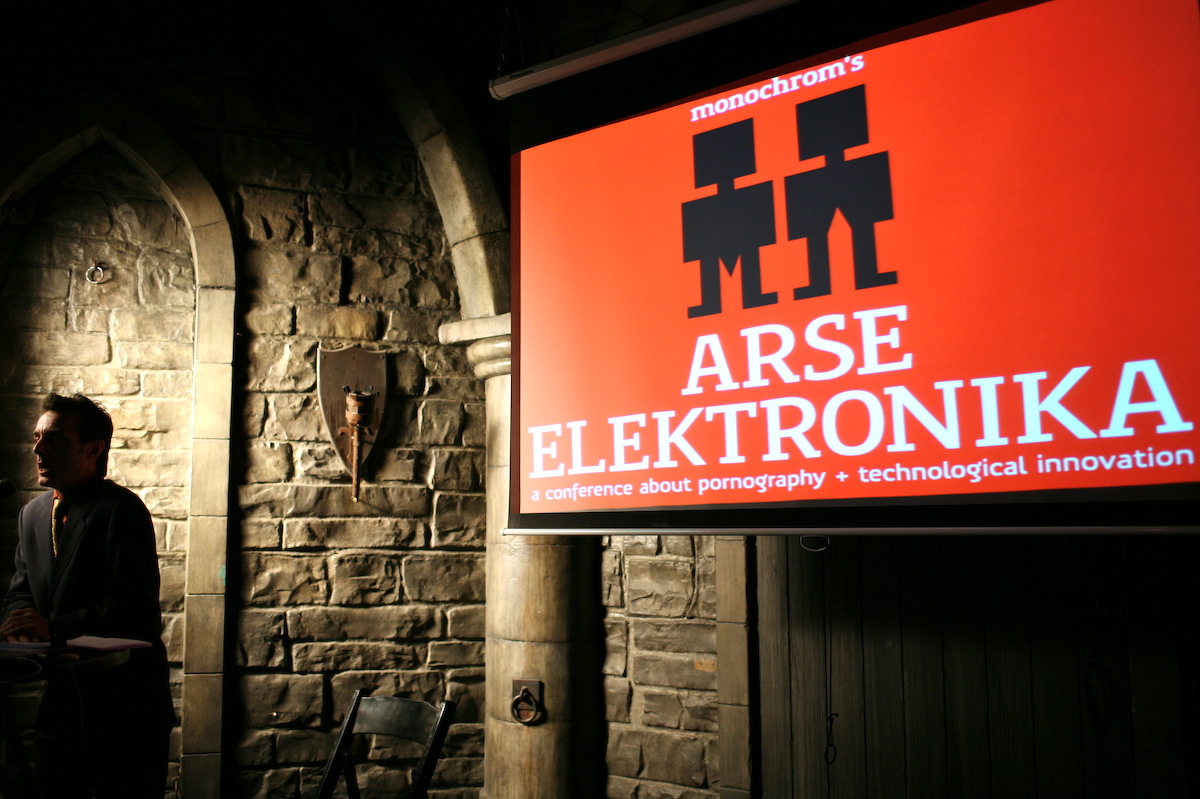
Mark Dery talking at monochrom's Arse Elektronika 2007

In 1990, Dery's New York Times article "The Merry Pranksters and the Art of the Hoax" offered an early discussion in the mainstream media of the practice of "cultural jamming" by an emergent generation of activists.

In Flame Wars, Dery wonders, in an essay titled "Black to the Future," why "so few African-Americans write science fiction, a genre whose close encounters with the Other – the stranger in a strange land – would seem uniquely suited to the concerns of African-American novelists?" In the piece, Dery interviews three African-American thinkers — science fiction writer Samuel R. Delany, writer and musician Greg Tate, and cultural critic Tricia Rose — about different critical dimensions of Afrofuturism, and it is in his introductory essay to "Black to the Future" that Dery coins the term 'Afrofuturism', which now figures prominently in studies of black technoculture. He defines it as:

Speculative fiction that treats African-American themes and addresses African-American concerns in the context of twentieth- century technoculture — and, more generally, African-American signification that appropriates images of technology and a prosthetically enhanced future — might, for want of a better term, be called Afro futurism.

Dery's essay "Cotton Candy Autopsy: Deconstructing Psycho Killer Clowns" in The Pyrotechnic Insanitarium: American Culture on the Brink (1999) is his close reading of the "evil clown" meme.

In 2018, Dery released a biography of the artist and illustrator Edward Gorey, entitled Born to Be Posthumous: The Eccentric Life and Mysterious Genius of Edward Gorey. Widely reviewed, the book is the first biography of the eccentric figure, putting Gorey's idiosyncratic creations into a more personal context.

== Books ==
- Culture Jamming: Hacking, Slashing and Sniping in the Empire of Signs. Open Magazine Pamphlet Series, 1993.
- Flame Wars: The Discourse of Cyberculture (ed.). Duke University Press, 1994. ISBN 978-0-8223-1540-7.
- Escape Velocity: Cyberculture at the End of the Century. Grove Press, 1996. ISBN 978-0-8021-3520-9.
- The Pyrotechnic Insanitarium: American Culture on the Brink. Grove Press, 1999. ISBN 978-0-8021-3670-1.
- I Must Not Think Bad Thoughts: Drive-By Essays on American Dread, American Dreams. University of Minnesota Press, 2012. ISBN 978-0-8166-7773-3.
- Born to Be Posthumous: The Eccentric Life and Mysterious Genius of Edward Gorey. Little, Brown and Company, 2018. ISBN 978-0-316-18854-8.
- England My England: Anglophilia Explained, Thought Catalog, 2018, B0792JKQQC.
