= Basil Temple Blackwood =

British lawyer and artist

Lord Basil Hamilton-Temple-Blackwood
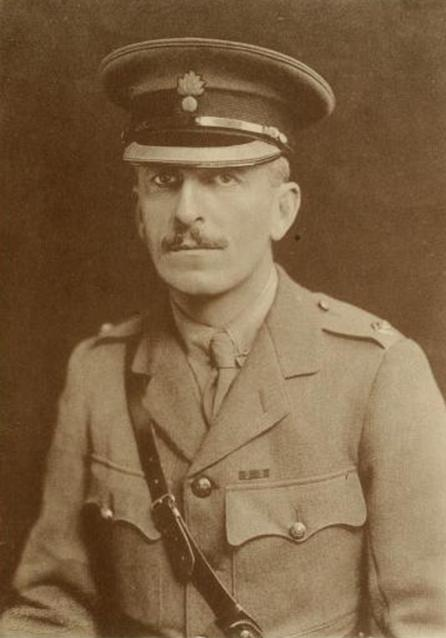
- Lord Basil Temple Blackwood in the uniform of the Grenadier Guards in 1916
- Born: 4 November 1870; Clandeboye, Ireland
- Died: 3 July 1917 (aged 46); Boesinghe, Ypres salient, Belgium
- Occupations: Lawyer, Administrator, Civil servant, Soldier
- Parent(s): Frederick Hamilton-Temple-Blackwood, 1st Marquess of Dufferin and Ava; Hariot Rowan-Hamilton

Lord Ian Basil Gawaine Hamilton-Temple-Blackwood (4 November 1870 – 3 July 1917), known as Lord Basil Temple Blackwood, was a British lawyer, civil servant and book illustrator.

== Early life ==
Temple Blackwood was the third son and fifth child of Frederick Hamilton-Temple-Blackwood, 1st Marquess of Dufferin and Ava and Hariot Hamilton-Temple-Blackwood. He was born in Clandeboye, Ireland. After spending part of his childhood in Canada, where his father was Governor General, he attended Harrow School. He went up to Balliol College, Oxford in 1891, but never graduated. Whilst at Oxford, he became friends with Hilaire Belloc, with whom he would enjoy long walks and canoeing trips.

== Illustrations ==
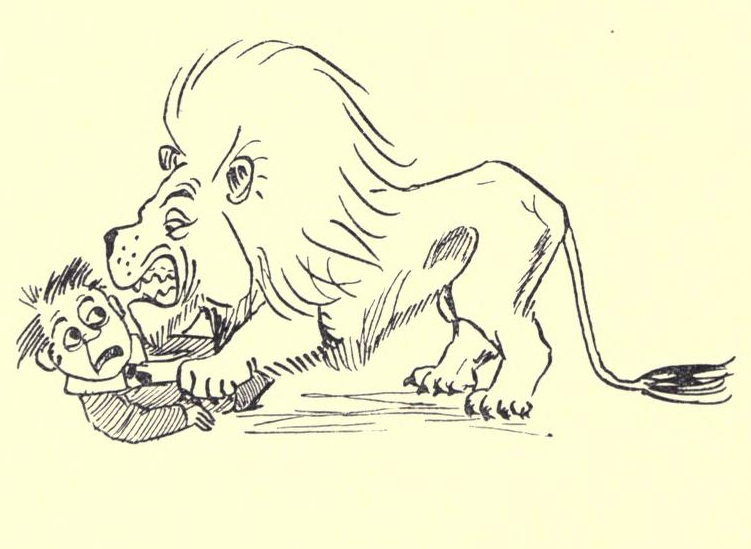
Illustration by Basil Temple Blackwood for Cautionary Tales for Children by Hilaire Belloc. This is "Jim, who ran away from his Nurse, and was eaten by a Lion".

In 1896, Belloc approached Blackwood to illustrate his book of humorous children's verse, The Bad Child's Book of Beasts. Blackwood's amusing pen and ink sketches were in a style which has been described as "German expressionism", and were credited only to "B.T.B.". The book was an immediate success. Blackwood went on to illustrate several more of Belloc's books, including: The Modern Traveller (1898), A Moral Alphabet (1899), More Peers (1900), Cautionary Tales for Children (1907) and More Beasts for Worse Children (1910). In the rhyming introduction to the Cautionary Tales, Belloc describes Blackwood's drawings as "...the nicest things you ever saw". Some critics claim that there is anti-Semitism in Blackwood's drawings.

== "Milner's Kindergarten" ==
Blackwood studied law and was called to the Bar in 1896. In 1900, he was taken to South Africa by Lord Milner, who had been appointed High Commissioner of South Africa in 1897 and assembled a body of talented young assistants who became known as "Milner's Kindergarten". Blackwood was employed in the Judge Advocate's Department for a year, then was Assistant Colonial Secretary of Orange River Colony from 1901 to 1907. He became Colonial Secretary of Barbados in 1907 and returning to England in 1910, was appointed Assistant Secretary of the Land Development Commission.

== Military service ==
On the outbreak of World War I, Blackwood obtained a commission as a 2nd Lieutenant in the 9th Lancers, at the age of 44. He served as a "galloper" at the Battle of Mons and was severely wounded in October 1914 and returned to the United Kingdom. While not yet fit for active service, he served in the Intelligence Corps, and was Private Secretary to the Lord Lieutenant of Ireland in 1916; but had recovered sufficiently to become a Lieutenant in the Grenadier Guards in the same year. Blackwood was killed in action in a night raid at Boesinghe near Ypres on 4 July 1917. His name is inscribed on the Menin Gate Memorial to the Missing.
