= The Iron Tonic =

1969 book by Edward Gorey

- Author: Edward Gorey
- Original title: The Iron Tonic: Or, A Winter Afternoon in Lonely Valley
- Illustrator: Edward Gorey
- Language: English
- Genre: Surrealist fiction
- Published: 1969
- Publisher: Albondocani Press
- Publication date: 1969
- Publication place: United States
- Media type: Print (Hardcover)
- Pages: 14 panels

The Iron Tonic: Or, A Winter Afternoon in Lonely Valley is a surrealist country-house mystery by Edward Gorey that presents a series of unresolved clues. The work features Gorey's characteristic fine-lined, 19th-century engraving style.

The work consists of 14 illustrated panels with accompanying rhyming text written in iambic pentameter. The narrative depicts a remote manor house inhabited by elderly and infirm residents.

The work is dedicated to the memory of Gorey's maternal great-grandmother, Helen St. John Garvey (1834–1907).

== Publication ==
The Iron Tonic was first published in 1969 by Albondocani Press in a limited edition of 226 copies. It was later republished for the trade market by Harcourt, Inc. in the form of a small, hardbound book illustrated on both front and back covers.

== Literary reception ==
Wim Tigges described the book as "a compilation of hardly related couplets," in which nonsense objects "are seen to be falling unaccountably out of the sky." Tigges notes it uses a device commonly used in Gorey's writing, "the unexplained recurrence of an irrelevant object".
