= Gage Taylor =

American artist (1942–2000)

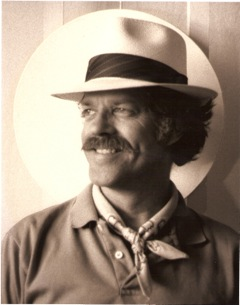
Gage Taylor, Age 42

Gage Taylor (1942 – 2000) was a visionary artist known for his psychedelic-inspired landscapes. Art critic Thomas Albright wrote, "Taylor's landscape fantasies combined profuse detail with heavier, painterly surfaces and achieved a 'naive' and nostalgic flavor, like the work of a visionary Grandma Moses."

== Career ==
Taylor's art has been exhibited at the Whitney Museum in New York; the Paris Biennalle; the Smithsonian; the Museum of Contemporary Art, Chicago; the National Museum of American Art; and the San Francisco Museum of Modern Art. Some of Taylor's psychedelic works were printed as posters, including Mescaline Woods and The Road, and Artweek's David Clark estimated that Taylor's reproductions (and those of his compeer Bill Martin), "are on millions of walls throughout the western world." Taylor created the album cover art for The New Riders of the Purple Sage's Brujo, as well as Larry Coryell's Fairyland. Of his own work, Taylor said, "I'm not outwardly political, but I consider my painting to be about the social revolution."

=== Baja exhibition ===
In 1974, Taylor and his peer Robert Moon returned from a short tour of Baja, Mexico, “exulting about the fantastic wilderness they had seen,” according to the Village Voice’s Howard Smith. From that experience, Taylor and Moon submitted a proposal which was accepted by the San Francisco Museum of Art to take a monthlong expedition back to Baja along with four contemporaries: Robert Fried, Gerald Gooch, Bill Martin, and Richard Lowenberg. What resulted was the San Francisco Museum of Modern Art's exhibition, Baja, which Artweek's Clark heralded as "a popular success."

== Education ==
Taylor received his BFA from University of Texas in 1965 and his MFA from Michigan State University in 1967.

== Personal life ==
Gage Taylor resided in Woodacre, California until 1983. He married his apprentice of four years, artist Uriel Dana, and they collaborated under the name Taylor-Dana for 17 years. Gage Taylor and Uriel Dana exhibited their collaborative work at the Illuminarium Gallery and Isis Rising Galleries in Mill Valley, Corte Madera, Santa Monica, and Tampa; Center Art Galleries in Honolulu, Hawaii and multiple locations on Maui, Hawaii. Dyansen Galleries, Maui, HI. Their work was also sold through Addi Galleries on Maui, HI and Fine Art Collections in Kona, HI. During this time Gage Taylor and Uriel Dana were also Art Ambassadors for the Arts America Program for the USIA (State Department) and toured the Caribbean in this invitational post assisting the creative community. Gage Taylor and Uriel Dana lived in the Hawaiian Islands three years. They moved back to Sausalito, CA in 1990, three months after their work due to the 1989 Loma Prieta earthquake. Their work arrived one hour before the quake en route to Hanson Galleries where Taylor and Dana were represented in Sausalito, LaJolla, and Carmel, CA. Gage Taylor and Uriel Dana collaborative work was also sold at Eaton Galleries Sausalito, and Sierra Galleries, Tiburon with work still being represented on Maui, HI by Addi Galleries. From 1991 onward Gage Taylor and Uriel Dana was represented by Conacher Galleries on Maiden Lane in San Francisco until Don Conacher's death. A major exhibit of their collaborative work was held at the Rosicrucian Egyptian Museum in San Jose, CA in 1991. The exhibit was entitled The Mythic Image and the first poster for the museum was printed after 75 years of their painting Honoring the Goddess.
