= The Curious Sofa =

1961 illustrated book by Edward Gorey

- Author: Edward Gorey (Ogdred Weary)
- Illustrator: Edward Gorey (Ogdred Weary)
- Cover artist: Edward Gorey (Ogdred Weary)
- Publisher: I. Obolensky
- Publication date: 1961
- ISBN: 978-0-396-07861-6 (1980 reprint)
- OCLC: 1943444

The Curious Sofa is a 1961 book by American illustrator and writer Edward Gorey, published under the anagrammatic pen name Ogdred Weary. According to the cover, the book is a "pornographic illustrated story about furniture." While the book contains no explicit content, it uses visual innuendo, such as urns, tree branches, and drapery, to suggest sexual situations. The New York Times Book Review referred to it as "Gorey's naughty, hilarious travesty of lust." Gorey stated that the work was intended as a satire of the erotic novel Story of O.

The Curious Sofa was later included in the 1972 anthology Amphigorey.

The German translation was banned in Austria in 1966 on the grounds that it "is therefore suitable for deleteriously influencing the moral, mental and health development of young people, particularly by stimulating lustfulness and misleading the sex drive."
