= The Bad Child's Book of Beasts =

1896 children's book by Hilaire Belloc

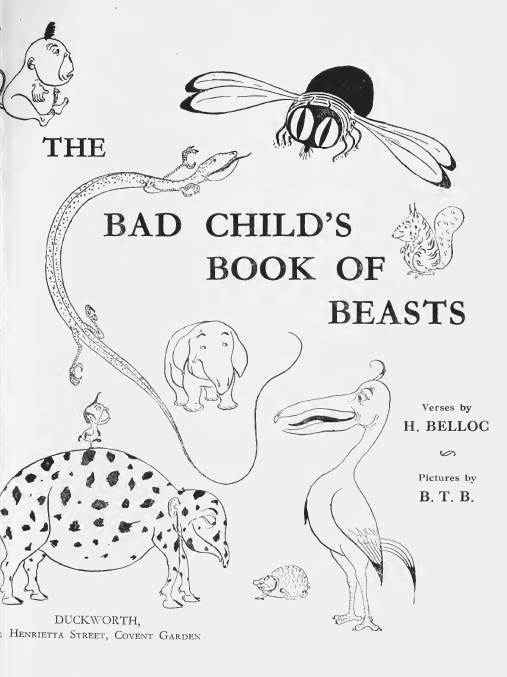
- Cover of the 1918 edition
- Author: Hilaire Belloc
- Illustrator: Basil Temple Blackwood
- Language: English
- Genre: Children's literature
- Publisher: The Camelot Press Limited
- Publication date: 1896
- Followed by: More Beasts for Worse Children
- Text: The Bad Child's Book of Beasts at Wikisource

The Bad Child's Book of Beasts is an 1896 children's book written by Hilaire Belloc. Illustrated by Basil Temple Blackwood, the superficially naive verses give tongue-in-cheek advice to children. In the book, the animals tend to be sage-like, and the humans dull and self-satisfied. Within the first three months of its publication, The Bad Child's Book of Beasts sold 4,000 copies.

Lord Alfred Douglas accused Belloc of plagiarizing his work Tales with a Twist, which, although published two years after The Bad Child's Book of Beasts, was, according to Douglas, written before Belloc's work.

Belloc's friend Donald Tovey had composed musical settings of some of the verses by 1899 and played them in public. In 1911 Belloc expressed an interest in seeing them published. However, Tovey never got around to producing a final score, and the settings are now lost.

The illustrations have also drawn comparison to the works seen in Dr. Seuss books.

== Example poem ==
The Dodo

The Dodo used to walk around,

And take the sun and air.

The sun yet warms his native ground –

The Dodo is not there!

The voice which used to squawk and squeak

Is now for ever dumb –

Yet may you see his bones and beak

All in the Mu-se-um.
