= Edward Gorey =

American writer and illustrator (1925–2000)

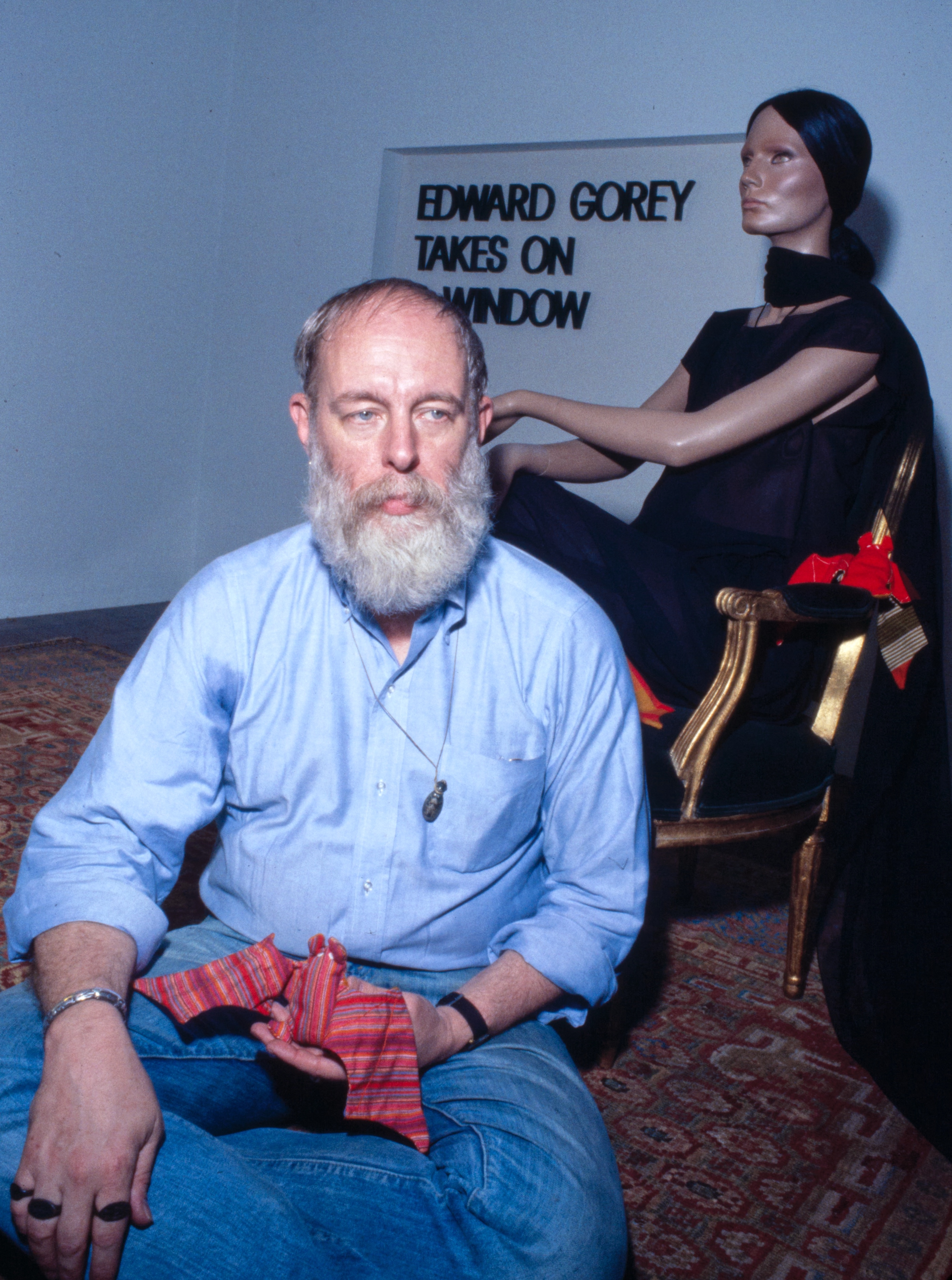
- Gorey setting up mannequins in Henri Bendel's window, 1978
- Born: Edward St. John Gorey; February 22, 1925; Chicago, Illinois, U.S.
- Died: April 15, 2000 (aged 75); Cape Cod Hospital, Hyannis, Massachusetts, U.S.
- Education: Art Institute of Chicago (attended); Harvard University (BA)
- Known for: Writer, illustrator, poet, costume designer
- Notable work: The Gashlycrumb Tinies, The Doubtful Guest, Mystery!
- Movement: Literary nonsense, surrealism
- Awards: Tony Award for Best Costume Design; Deutscher Jugendliteraturpreis

Edward St. John Gorey (February 22, 1925 – April 15, 2000) was an American writer, Tony Award-winning costume designer, and artist, noted for his own illustrated books as well as cover art and illustration for books by other writers. His characteristic pen-and-ink drawings often depict vaguely unsettling narrative scenes in Victorian and Edwardian settings.

== Early life ==
Gorey was born in Chicago. His parents, Helen Dunham (née Garvey) and Edward Leo Gorey, divorced in 1936 when he was 11. His father remarried in 1952 when he was 27. His stepmother was Corinna Mura (1910–1965), a cabaret singer who had a small role in Casablanca as the woman playing the guitar while singing "La Marseillaise" at Rick's Café Américain. His father was briefly a journalist. Gorey's maternal great-grandmother, Helen St. John Garvey, was a nineteenth-century greeting card illustrator, from whom he claimed to have inherited his talents. Gorey was a child prodigy who began drawing pictures at eighteen months old and taught himself to read by the time he was three.

From 1934 to 1937, Gorey attended public school in the Chicago suburb of Wilmette, Illinois (although he skipped several grades), where his classmates included Charlton Heston, Warren MacKenzie, and Joan Mitchell. Some of his earliest preserved work appears in the Stolp School yearbook for 1937. Afterward, he attended the Francis W. Parker School in Chicago. He spent 1944 to 1946 in the Army at Dugway Proving Ground in Utah. He then attended Harvard University, beginning in 1946 and graduating in the class of 1950; he studied French and roomed with poet Frank O'Hara in Eliot House. Starting in 1951, Gorey illustrated poetry books by Merrill Moore for Twayne Publishers including Case Record from a Sonnetorium (many illustrations by Gorey, 1951), and More Clinical Sonnets (1953).

In the early 1950s, Gorey, with a group of recent Harvard and Radcliffe alumni including Alison Lurie (1947), John Ashbery (1949), Donald Hall (1951), and Frank O'Hara (1950), amongst others, founded the Poets' Theatre in Cambridge, which was supported by Harvard faculty members John Ciardi and Thornton Wilder.

He frequently stated that his formal art training was "negligible"; Gorey studied art for one semester at the School of the Art Institute of Chicago in 1943.

== Career ==
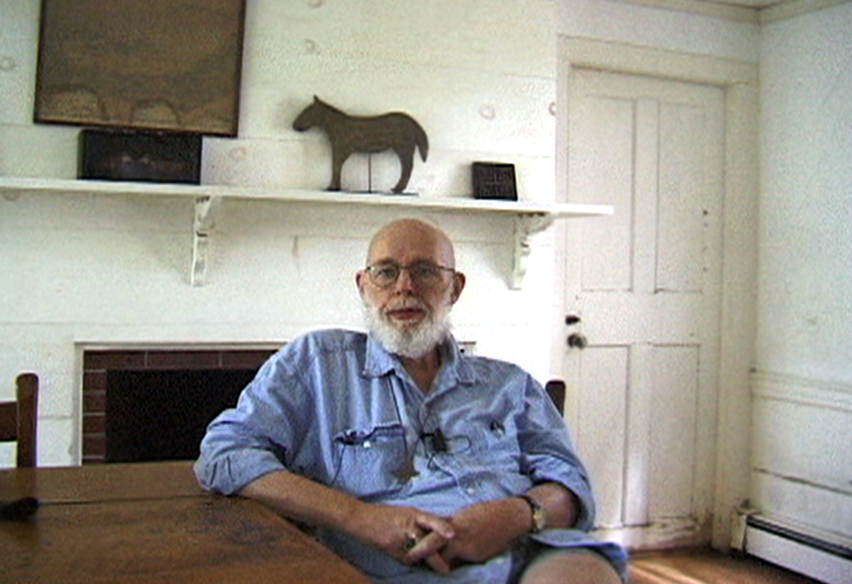
Gorey in the kitchen of his home in Yarmouth, Cape Cod, 1999

From 1953 to 1960, he lived in Manhattan and worked for the Art Department of Doubleday Anchor, where he illustrated book covers, added illustrations to text, and provided typographic design. He illustrated works as diverse as Bram Stoker's Dracula, H. G. Wells' The War of the Worlds, and T. S. Eliot's Old Possum's Book of Practical Cats. Throughout his career, he illustrated over 200 book covers for Doubleday Anchor, Random House's Looking Glass Library, Bobbs-Merrill, and as a freelance artist. In later years he produced cover illustrations and interior artwork for many children's books by John Bellairs, as well as books begun by Bellairs and continued by Brad Strickland after Bellairs' death.

His first independent work, The Unstrung Harp, was published in 1953. He also published under various pen names, some of which were anagrams of his first and last names, such as Ogdred Weary, Dogear Wryde, Ms. Regera Dowdy, and dozens more. His books also feature the names Eduard Blutig ("Edward Gory"), a German-language pun on his own name, and O. Müde (German for O. Weary).

At the prompting of Harry Stanton, an editor and vice president at Addison-Wesley, Gorey collaborated on a number of works (and continued a lifelong correspondence) with Peter F. Neumeyer.

The New York Times credits bookstore owner Andreas Brown and his store, the Gotham Book Mart, with launching Gorey's career: "It became the central clearing house for Mr. Gorey, presenting exhibitions of his work in the store's gallery and eventually turning him into an international celebrity."

Poster for the 1977 Broadway revival of Dracula, art by Gorey. He won the Tony Award for Best Costume Design and was nominated for the Tony Award for Best Scenic Design for the production.

Gorey's illustrated (and sometimes wordless) books, with their vaguely ominous air and ostensibly Victorian and Edwardian settings, have long had a cult following. He made a notable impact on the world of theater with his designs for the 1977 Broadway revival of Dracula, for which he won the Tony Award for Best Costume Design and was nominated for the Tony Award for Best Scenic Design. In 1980, Gorey became particularly well known for his animated introduction to the PBS series Mystery! In the introduction of each Mystery! episode, host Vincent Price would welcome viewers to "Gorey Mansion".

Because of the settings and style of Gorey's work, many people have assumed he was British; in fact, he only left the U.S. once, for a visit to the Scottish Hebrides. In later years, he lived year-round in Yarmouth Port, Massachusetts, on Cape Cod, where he wrote and directed numerous evening-length entertainments, often featuring his own papier-mâché puppets, an ensemble known as Le Theatricule Stoique. The first of these productions, Lost Shoelaces, premiered in Woods Hole, Massachusetts, on August 13, 1987. The last was The White Canoe: an Opera Seria for Hand Puppets, for which Gorey wrote the libretto, with a score by the composer Daniel James Wolf. The opera, which was based on Thomas Moore's poem The Lake of the Dismal Swamp, was performed under the direction of Carol Verburg, a close friend and neighbor of the artist, after Gorey died. Herbert Senn and Helen Pond, two renowned set designers, created a puppet stage for the opera. In the early 1970s, Gorey wrote an unproduced screenplay for a silent film, The Black Doll.

After Gorey's death, one of his executors, Andreas Brown, turned up a large cache of unpublished work, both complete and incomplete. Brown described the find as "ample material for many future books and for plays based on his work".

== Personal life ==
Gorey was devoted to the New York City Ballet, attending every performance and some rehearsals for 25 years.

Critic David Ehrenstein, writing in Gay City News, argues that Gorey was discreet about his sexuality in the "Don't Ask/Don't Tell era" of the 1950s. "Stonewall changed all that—making gay a discussable mainstream topic," writes Ehrenstein. "But it didn't change things for Gorey. To those in the know, his sensibility was clearly gay, but his sexual life was as covert as his self was overt."

Alexander Theroux writes that when Gorey was asked about his sexual orientation by "a rude Boston Globe reporter," he replied, "I don't even know." Theroux is referring to Lisa Solod's September 1980 Boston magazine interview ("Edward Gorey: The Cape's master teller of macabre tales discusses death, decadence, and homosexuality"). Gorey's exact words were: "Well, I'm neither one thing nor the other particularly. I suppose I'm gay. But I don't really identify with it much. I am fortunate in that I am apparently reasonably undersexed or something. I do not spend my life picking up people on the streets. I was always reluctant to go to the movies with one of my friends because I always expected the police to come and haul him out of the loo at one point or the other. I know people who lead really outrageous lives. I've never said I was gay, and I've never said I wasn't. A lot of people would say that I wasn't because I never do anything about it." Shortly thereafter, he says, "What I'm trying to say is that I am a person before I am anything else."

The remark "I suppose I'm gay" was omitted when the interview appeared in Ascending Peculiarity, a collection of interviews edited by art critic Karen Wilkin.

From 1995 until his death in April 2000, Gorey was the subject of a cinéma vérité–style documentary directed by Christopher Seufert. (As of 2026, the accompanying book and soundtrack have both been released and the film is in advanced post-production.)

Gorey took art classes at Cape Cod Community College and volunteered as a camera operator at the local public access station, Cape Cod Community Television, where he designed illustrations and bulletin graphics.

Gorey left the bulk of his estate to a charitable trust benefiting cats and dogs, as well as other species, including bats and insects.

=== Edward Gorey House ===
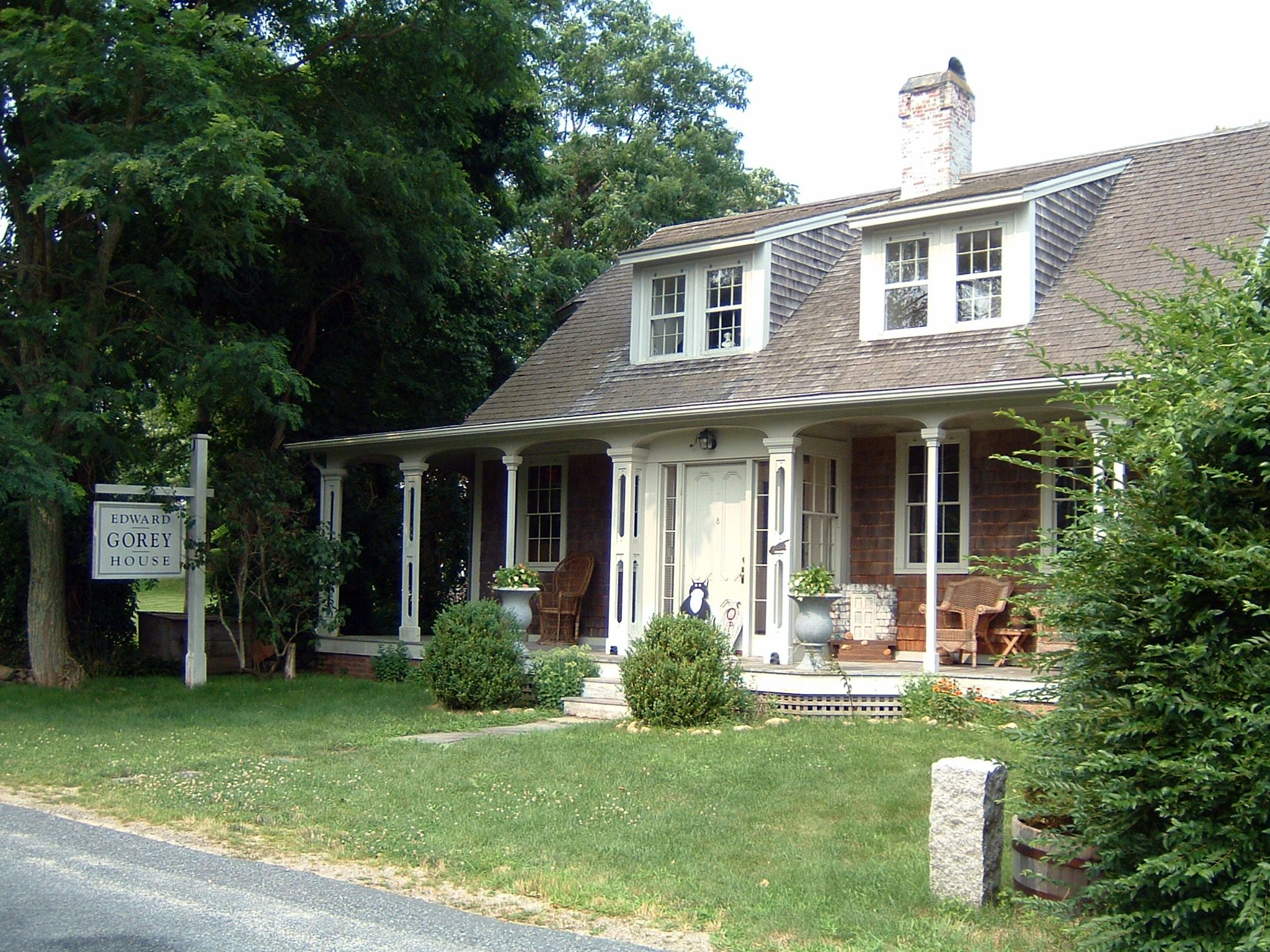
Edward Gorey House, Yarmouth Port, Massachusetts (2006)

Gorey's former home in Yarmouth Port, Massachusetts, is the subject of two photography books: Elephant House: Or, the Home of Edward Gorey by Kevin McDermott and Memento Gorey: The Last Interviews with Edward Gorey by Christopher Seufert.

The house is now the Edward Gorey House Museum.

== Style ==
Cover of The Willowdale Handcar (1962)

Gorey is typically described as an illustrator. His books may be found in the humor and cartoon sections of major bookstores, but books such as The Object Lesson have earned serious critical respect as works of surrealist art. His experimentation—creating books that were wordless, books that were literally matchbox-sized, pop-up books, books entirely populated by inanimate objects—complicates matters still further. As Gorey told Lisa Solod of The Boston Globe, "Ideally, if anything were any good, it would be indescribable." Gorey classified his own work as literary nonsense, the genre made most famous by Lewis Carroll and Edward Lear.

In response to being called gothic, he stated, "If you're doing nonsense it has to be rather awful, because there'd be no point. I'm trying to think if there's sunny nonsense. Sunny, funny nonsense for children—oh, how boring, boring, boring. As Schubert said, there is no happy music. And that's true, there really isn't. And there's probably no happy nonsense, either."

== Bibliography ==
Gorey illustrated an estimated 500 books by other authors, including Merrill Moore, Samuel Beckett, Edward Lear, John Bellairs, H. G. Wells, Alain-Fournier, Charles Dickens, T. S. Eliot, Hilaire Belloc, Muriel Spark, Florence Parry Heide, John Updike, John Ciardi, Felicia Lamport, and Joan Aiken.

Gorey himself authored 116 books.

- The Unstrung Harp, Brown and Company, 1953
- The Listing Attic, Brown and Company, 1954
- The Doubtful Guest, Doubleday, 1957
- The Object-Lesson, Doubleday, 1958
- The Bug Book, Looking Glass Library, 1959
- The Fatal Lozenge: An Alphabet, Obolensky, 1960
- The Curious Sofa: A Pornographic Work by Ogdred Weary, Astor-Honor, 1961
- The Hapless Child, Obolensky, 1961
- The Willowdale Handcar: Or, the Return of the Black Doll, Bobbs-Merrill Company, 1962
- The Beastly Baby, Fantod Press, 1962
- The Vinegar Works: Three Volumes of Moral Instruction, Simon & Schuster, 1963
  - The Gashlycrumb Tinies
  - The Insect God
  - The West Wing
- The Wuggly Ump, Lippincott, 1963
- The Nursery Frieze, Fantod Press, 1964
- The Sinking Spell, Obolensky, 1964
- The Remembered Visit: A Story Taken from Life, Simon & Schuster, 1965
- Three Books from Fantod Press (1), Fantod Press, 1966
  - The Evil Garden
  - The Inanimate Tragedy
  - The Pious Infant
- The Gilded Bat, Cape, 1967
- The Utter Zoo, Meredith Press, 1967
- The Other Statue, Simon & Schuster, 1968
- The Blue Aspic, Meredith Press, 1968
- The Epiplectic Bicycle, Dodd and Mead, 1969
- The Iron Tonic: Or, A Winter Afternoon in Lonely Valley, Albondocani Press, 1969
- Three Books from the Fantod Press (2), Fantod Press, 1970
  - The Chinese Obelisks: Fourth Alphabet
  - Donald Has a Difficulty
  - The Osbick Bird
- The Sopping Thursday, Gotham Book Mart, 1970
- Three Books from the Fantod Press (3), Fantod Press, 1971
  - The Deranged Cousins
  - The Eleventh Episode
  - The Untitled Book
- The Awdrey-Gore Legacy, 1972
- Leaves from a Mislaid Album, Gotham Book Mart, 1972
- The Abandoned Sock, Fantod Press, 1972
- A Limerick, Salt-Works Press, 1973
- The Lavender Leotard, Gotham Book Mart, 1973
- CatEgorY, Gotham Book Mart, 1973
- The Lost Lions, Fantod Press, 1973
- The Green Beads, Albondocani Press, 1978
- The Glorious Nosebleed: Fifth Alphabet, Mead, 1975
- The Grand Passion: A Novel, Fantod Press, 1976
- The Broken Spoke, Mead, 1976
- The Loathsome Couple, Mead, 1977
- Gorey Games, Troubadour Press, 1979 (games designed by Larry Evans)
- Dancing Cats and Neglected Murderesses, Workman, 1980
- The Water Flowers, Congdon & Weed, 1982
- The Dwindling Party, Random House, 1982
- Gorey Cats, Troubadour Press, 1982 (with Malcolm Whyte and Nancie West Swanber)
- The Prune People, Albondocani Press, 1983
- Gorey Stories, 1983
- The Tunnel Calamity, Putnam's Sons, 1984
- The Eclectic Abecedarium, Adama Books, 1985
- The Prune People II, Albondocani Press, 1985
- The Improvable Landscape, Albondocani Press, 1986
- The Raging Tide: Or, The Black Doll's Imbroglio, Beaufort Books, 1987
- Q. R. V. (later retitled The Universal Solvent), Anne & David Bromer, 1989
- The Stupid Joke, Fantod Press, 1990
- The Fraught Settee, Fantod Press, 1990
- The Doleful Domesticity; Another Novel, Fantod Press, 1991
- La Balade Troublante, Fantod Press, 1991
- The Retrieved Locket, Fantod Press, 1994
- The Unknown Vegetable, Fantod Press, 1995
- The Just Dessert: Thoughtful Alphabet XI, Fantod Press, 1997
- Deadly Blotter: Thoughtful Alphabet XVII, Fantod Press, 1997
- The Haunted Tea-Cosy: A Dispirited and Distasteful Diversion for Christmas, Harcourt, Brace, Jovanovich, 1998
- The Headless Bust: A Melancholy Meditation on the False Millennium, Harcourt, Brace, Jovanovich, 1999

The Gashlycrumb Tinies (1963)

=== Other works ===
- The Fantod Pack, a divination card deck, first published in Esquire (December 1966)

=== Anthologies ===
Many of Gorey's early works were published obscurely, making them rare and expensive. He published four omnibus editions that collect as many as 15 of his books into one volume:

- Amphigorey, 1972 (ISBN 978-0-399-50433-4) – contains The Unstrung Harp, The Listing Attic, The Doubtful Guest, The Object-Lesson, The Bug Book, The Fatal Lozenge, The Hapless Child, The Curious Sofa, The Willowdale Handcar, The Gashlycrumb Tinies, The Insect God, The West Wing, The Wuggly Ump, The Sinking Spell, and The Remembered Visit
- Amphigorey Too, 1975 (ISBN 978-0-399-50420-4) – contains The Beastly Baby, The Nursery Frieze, The Pious Infant, The Evil Garden, The Inanimate Tragedy, The Gilded Bat, The Iron Tonic, The Osbick Bird, The Chinese Obelisks (bis), The Deranged Cousins, The Eleventh Episode, [The Untitled Book], The Lavender Leotard, The Disrespectful Summons, The Abandoned Sock, The Lost Lions, Story for Sara [by Alphonse Allais], The Salt Herring [by Charles Cros], Leaves from a Mislaid Album, and A Limerick
- Amphigorey Also, 1983 (ISBN 978-0-15-605672-4) – contains The Utter Zoo, The Blue Aspic, The Epiplectic Bicycle, The Sopping Thursday, The Grand Passion, Les Passementeries Horribles, The Eclectic Abecedarium, L'Heure bleue, The Broken Spoke, The Awdrey-Gore Legacy, The Glorious Nosebleed, The Loathsome Couple, The Green Beads, Les Urnes Utiles, The Stupid Joke, The Prune People, and The Tuning Fork
- Amphigorey Again, 2006 (ISBN 978-0-15-101107-0) – contains The Galoshes of Remorse, Signs of Spring, Seasonal Confusion, Random Walk, Category, The Other Statue, 10 Impossible Objects (abridged), The Universal Solvent (abridged), Scenes de Ballet, Verse Advice, The Deadly Blotter, Creativity, The Retrieved Locket, The Water Flowers, The Haunted Tea-Cosy, Christmas Wrap-Up, The Headless Bust, The Just Dessert, The Admonitory Hippopotamus, Neglected Murderesses, Tragedies Topiares, The Raging Tide, The Unknown Vegetable, Another Random Walk, Serious Life: A Cruise, Figbash Acrobate, La Malle Saignante, and The Izzard Book

== Pseudonyms ==
Gorey was very fond of word games, particularly anagrams. He created many of his works under pseudonyms that usually were anagrams of his own name (most famously Ogdred Weary). Some of them are listed below, with the corresponding book title(s). Eduard Blutig is also a word game: "Blutig" is German (the language from which these two books purportedly were translated) for "bloody" or "gory".

- Ogdred Weary – The Curious Sofa, The Beastly Baby
- Mrs. Regera Dowdy – The Pious Infant, The Izzard Book
- Eduard Blutig – The Evil Garden (translated from Der Böse Garten by Mrs. Regera Dowdy), The Tuning Fork (translated from Der Zeitirrthum by Mrs. Regera Dowdy)
- Raddory Gewe – The Eleventh Episode
- Dogear Wryde – The Broken Spoke/Cycling Cards
- E. G. Deadworry – The Awdrey-Gore Legacy and his grandson G.E. Deadworry
- D. Awdrey-Gore – The Toastrack Enigma, The Blancmange Tragedy, The Postcard Mystery, The Pincushion Affair, The Toothpaste Murder, The Dustwrapper Secret and The Teacosy Crime (Note: These books, although attributed to Awdrey-Gore in Gorey's book The Awdrey-Gore Legacy, were not really written). She is a parody of Agatha Christie.
- Waredo Dyrge – The Awdrey-Gore Legacy parody of Hercule Poirot
- Edward Pig – The Untitled Book
- Wardore Edgy – SoHo Weekly News
- Madame Groeda Weyrd – The Fantod Pack
- Dewda Yorger – "The Deary Rewdgo Series for Intrepid Young Ladies (D.R. on the Great Divide, D.R. in the Yukon, D.R. at Baffin Bay, etc.)"
- Garrod Weedy – The Pointless Book

== Legacy ==
Gorey has become an iconic figure in the goth subculture. Events themed on his works and decorated in his characteristic style are common in the more Victorian-styled elements of the subculture, notably the Edwardian costume balls held annually in San Francisco and Los Angeles, which include performances based on his works. The "Edwardian" in this case refers less to the Edwardian period of history than to Gorey, whose characters are depicted as wearing fashion styles ranging from the mid-nineteenth century to the 1930s.

Among the authors influenced by Gorey's work is Daniel Handler, who, under the pseudonym "Lemony Snicket", wrote the gothic children's book series A Series of Unfortunate Events. Shortly before Gorey's death, Handler sent a copy of the series' first two novels to him, with a letter "saying how much I admired his work, and how much I hoped that he would forgive what I'd stolen from him."

Director Mark Romanek's music video for the Nine Inch Nails song "The Perfect Drug" was designed specifically to resemble a Gorey book, with familiar Gorey elements including oversized urns, topiary plants, and glum, pale characters in full Edwardian costume. Also, Caitlín R. Kiernan has published a short story entitled "A Story for Edward Gorey" (Tales of Pain and Wonder, 2000), which features Gorey's black doll.

A more direct link to Gorey's influence on the music world is evident in The Gorey End, an album recorded in 2003 by The Tiger Lillies and the Kronos Quartet. This album was a collaboration with Gorey, who liked previous work by The Tiger Lillies so much that he sent them a large box of his unpublished works, which were then adapted and turned into songs. Gorey died before hearing the finished album.

In 1976, jazz composer Michael Mantler recorded an album called The Hapless Child (Watt/ECM) with Robert Wyatt, Terje Rypdal, Carla Bley, and Jack DeJohnette. It contains musical adaptations of The Sinking Spell, The Object Lesson, The Insect God, The Doubtful Guest, The Remembered Visit, and The Hapless Child. The last three songs also have been published on his 1987 Live album with Jack Bruce, Rick Fenn, and Nick Mason.

The opening titles of the PBS series Mystery! were original art by Gorey, in an animated sequence co-directed by Derek Lamb.

In the last few decades of his life, Gorey merchandise became quite popular, with stuffed dolls, cups, stickers, posters, and other items available at malls around the United States. In 2002, a book of his interviews entitled Ascending Peculiarity: Edward Gorey on Edward Gorey was released by author Karen Wilkin.

In 2007, The Jim Henson Company announced plans to produce a feature film based on The Doubtful Guest to be directed by Brad Peyton. No release date was given and there has been no further information since the announcement. The project was later announced again in 2021, with it now also being produced by Amblin Entertainment.

The online journal Goreyesque publishes artwork, stories, and poems in the spirit of Edward Gorey's work. The journal is co-sponsored by the Department of Creative Writing at Columbia College Chicago and Loyola University Chicago. Goreyesque was launched in tandem with the Chicago debut of two Gorey collections: Elegant Enigmas: The Art of Edward Gorey and G Is for Gorey. The collections were shown at the Loyola University Museum of Art (LUMA) in Chicago, Illinois from February 15 to June 15, 2014. Goreyesque features the work of both emerging talents and seasoned professionals, such as writers Sam Weller and Joe Meno.

In 2018, Seattle based cartoonist Marc Palm illustrated "The Gashlygun Tinies" for the October issue of Mad Magazine. Palm drew direct inspiration from Gorey's work "The Gashlycrumb Tinies" for this comic strip style parody riffing directly on Gorey's macabre illustration style and dark storyline. While the original work by Gorey lists in alphabetical order a string of horrible deaths of young children from A-Z; in this more recent parody version, Marc Palm uses Gorey's intricate black and white line-work heavy illustrative style and works alongside comedy writer Matt Cohen who applies Gorey's iconic poetically alliterative narrative framework as a commentary on gun violence and school shootings.

== See also ==
Contemporary American cartoonists with similar macabre style include:

- Charles Addams
- Gary Larson
- Angus Oblong
- Gahan Wilson
