= Deaths in March 1991 =

The following is a list of notable deaths in March 1991.

Entries for each day are listed alphabetically by surname. A typical entry lists information in the following sequence:

- Name, age, country of citizenship at birth, subsequent country of citizenship (if applicable), reason for notability, cause of death (if known), and reference.

== March 1991 ==
=== 1 ===
- Katherine Blake, 67 or 69, British actress (Anne of the Thousand Days, Within These Walls, Hammer the Toff).
- Mamie Geraldine Neale Bledsoe, 91, American educator and civil rights activist.
- Frank Esler-Smith, 42, English keyboardist, AIDS.
- Eugen Kamber, 66, Swiss Olympic cyclist (1948).
- Edwin H. Land, 81, American inventor and businessman (Polaroid Corporation).
- Leonid Markov, 63, Soviet actor, stomach cancer.
- Marie Rossi, 32, U.S. Army pilot, helicopter crash one day after Operation Desert Storm.
- Louis Saguer, 83, German-French composer.

=== 2 ===
- Arthur Attwell, 70, British Anglican prelate.
- Elmer Bischoff, 74, American artist.
- Serge Gainsbourg, 62, French musician, heart attack.
- Frank S. Giles Jr., 75, American politician.
- Mary Howard, 83, British novelist.
- Clark R. Mollenhoff, 69, American journalist, cancer.
- Josef Stalder, 72, Swiss Olympic gymnast (1948, 1952).
- John Stephens, 93, American baseball player.
- Lou Sullivan, 39, American author and transgender activist, AIDS.
- Eduard Vanaaseme, 92, Estonian Olympic weightlifter (1924).
- Ranjan Wijeratne, 59, Sri Lankan politician, explosion.

=== 3 ===
- Nikolai Bagley, 54, Soviet Olympic basketball player (1964).
- James Fullerton, 81, American ice hockey coach.
- Howard Head, 76, American aeronautical engineer.
- Joop van der Leij, 92, Dutch Olympic javelin thrower (1928).
- Arthur Murray, 95, Hungarian-American businessman.
- Sal Nistico, 50, American saxophonist.
- William Penney, Baron Penney, 81, English mathematician.
- Johnny Revolta, 79, American golfer.
- Dizzy Royal, 76, American baseball player.
- John Spotton, 64, Canadian filmmaker, drowned.
- Antoine Tassy, 66, Haitian football player.

=== 4 ===
- Vance Colvig, 72, American actor and voice actor (The Yogi Bear Show, UHF, The Quick Draw McGraw Show), cancer.
- Michael Hardwick, 66, English author.
- Pepe Iglesias, 76, Argentine comedian.
- Ellamae Ellis League, 91, American architect.
- Kenneth Lindsay, 93, British politician.
- Jean Loubignac, 89, French film director and screenwriter.
- Gready McKinnis, 77, American baseball player.

=== 5 ===
- Brian Batsford, 80, English politician.
- Steve Calvert, 74, American actor, heart attack.
- August de Schryver, 92, Belgian politician.
- Ian McLellan Hunter, 75, English screenwriter (Roman Holiday), heart attack.
- Helmut Sick, 81, German-Brazilian ornithologist.

=== 6 ===
- Habib Chatty, 74, Tunisian politician and diplomat.
- Tan Chye Cheng, 80, Singaporean politician, heart failure.
- Keith Collin, 54, English Olympic diver (1960).
- Herm Lee, 59, American football player (Pittsburgh Steelers, Chicago Bears).
- Horace Winchell Magoun, 83, American medical researcher.
- Larry Olsonoski, 65, American football player (Green Bay Packers).
- Salvo Randone, 84, Italian actor.
- Phoebe Blair-White, 95, Irish tennis player and Olympian (1924).

=== 7 ===
- John Bartha, 76, Hungarian actor (The Good, the Bad and the Ugly).
- Cool Papa Bell, 87, American Hall of Fame baseball player.
- Morton Fine, 74, American television writer (I Spy, Bold Venture, The Streets of San Francisco).
- Raymond Joseph Gallagher, 78, American Roman Catholic prelate.
- John Harris, 74, British novelist.
- Al Klink, 75, American saxophonist.
- Jean Piveteau, 91, French paleontologist.
- Josef Páleníček, 76, Czech pianist and composer.
- Bruno Venturini, 79, Italian football player and Olympian (1936).

=== 8 ===
- John Bellairs, 53, American author (The House with a Clock in Its Walls, The Face in the Frost, The Lamp from the Warlock's Tomb), cardiovascular disease.
- Michel d'Ornano, 66, French politician, struck by vehicle.
- Maria Eisner, 82, Italian-American photographer.
- Ludwig Fischer, 75, German racing driver.
- Donald M. Frame, 79–80, American literary scholar.
- Ernesto Minetto, 56, Italian cyclist.
- Roman Brother, 29, American Thoroughbred racehorse, horse colic.

=== 9 ===
- Ely do Amparo, 69, Brazilian footballer.
- Esther Blackie, 75, New Zealand cricketer.
- Jack Meyer, 85, English cricket player and educator.
- Max Fourny, 86, French art collector and racing driver.
- Paul Killeen, 87, Australian rules footballer.
- Jim Hardin, 47, American baseball player (Baltimore Orioles, New York Yankees, Atlanta Braves), plane crash.
- Tomojirō Ikenouchi, 84, Japanese composer, cerebral hemorrhage.
- Fritz Neumark, 90, German economist.

=== 10 ===
- Mildred Eldridge, 81, British artist.
- Antônio Giusfredi, 82, Brazilian Olympic hurdler (1932).
- Fumio Ito, 51, Japanese racing motorcyclist.
- Etheridge Knight, 59, American poet, lung cancer.
- Jock Morison, 76, Australian rules footballer.
- Elie Siegmeister, 82, American composer.
- Paul Ukena, 69, American opera singer, heart failure.

=== 11 ===
- Eric Brochon, 85, Swiss Olympic water polo player (1928).
- Robert A. Cook, 78, American academic and radio broadcaster.
- Hector Crawford, 77, Australian entrepreneur.
- Felix Fernström, 74, Swedish Olympic bobsledder (1952).
- Abul Kashem, 70, Bangladeshi linguist.
- Nikolaos Matussi, 91, Greek politician and Aromanian paramilitary leader during World War II.
- Maria Reining, 87, Austrian singer.

=== 12 ===
- José Maria Antunes, 77, Portuguese football player and a manager.
- LeRoy Collins, 82, American politician, governor of Florida (1955–1961), cancer.
- Ralph Henry Carless Davis, 72, British historian.
- Étienne Decroux, 92, French actor and mime artist.
- Ragnar Granit, 90, Finnish-Swedish physiologist, Nobel Prize recipient (1967).
- William Heinesen, 91, Faroese writer.
- Michael Langdon, 70, British opera singer.
- Muhammad Musa, 82, Pakistani general.
- Nicola Rossi-Lemeni, 70, Turkish-American opera singer.

=== 13 ===
- Donald Kaberry, Baron Kaberry of Adel, 83, British politician, homicide.
- Josef Manger, 77, German weightlifter and Olympic champion (1936).
- Jimmy McPartland, 83, American cornetist, lung cancer.
- Max Poll, 82, Belgian ichthyologist.
- Walter Presch, 80, Austrian football player.
- Göran Strindberg, 74, Swedish cinematographer.

=== 14 ===
- Howard Ashman, 40, American lyricist (Beauty and the Beast, Little Shop of Horrors, The Little Mermaid), Oscar winner (1990, 1992).
- Roy Hall, 71, American racing driver.
- John Jones, 91, Australian cricketer.
- Ebenezer Joshua, 82, Vincentian politician.
- Doc Pomus, 65, American blues musician, lung cancer.
- Margery Sharp, 86, English writer (The Rescuers).
- Maurice Zolotow, 77, American writer and biographer.

=== 15 ===
- G. Aravindan, 56, Indian filmmaker, musician, cartoonist, and painter, heart attack.
- Larry Bleach, 78, American baseball player.
- Miodrag Bulatović, 61, Yugoslav novelist.
- Robert Busnel, 76, French basketball player, traffic collision.
- George Eastman, 87, English cricketer.
- Bud Freeman, 84, American jazz musician.
- Robin Hill, 91, British biochemist.
- Stanisław Lorentz, 91, Polish art historian.
- Eileen Sedgwick, 92, American silent film actress, pneumonia.
- Vladimir Seleznev, 62, Soviet realist painter.
- George Sherman, 82, American filmmaker.
- Gerd Völs, 81, German Olympic rower (1936).
- Cloyd Webb, 49, Canadian football player.

=== 16 ===
- Chris Austin, 27, American country musician, plane crash.
- Jean Bellette, 82, Australian artist.
- Urbain Caffi, 74, Italian-French racing cyclist.
- Rowland Baring, 3rd Earl of Cromer, 72, British diplomat.
- Raymond Fletcher, 69, British politician and alleged spy.
- Roland Frank, 58, British-Kenyan Olympic field hockey player (1956).
- James Darcy Freeman, 83, Australian Roman Catholic cardinal.
- Trude Herr, 63, German actress.
- Walter Georg Kühne, 80, German paleontologist.
- Jan Herman van Roijen Jr., 85, Dutch diplomat.
- Armas Valste, 85, Finnish Olympic athlete (1928).

=== 17 ===
- Carl Aarvold, 83, English barrister.
- Pilar Primo de Rivera, 83, Spanish politician.
- Carlo Donat-Cattin, 71, Italian politician.
- Edward Gedge, 95, British Olympic pentathlete (1920).
- Peter Gordon, 69, New Zealand politician.

=== 18 ===
- Aladár Bitskey, 85, Hungarian Olympic swimmer (1928).
- Vilma Bánky, 90, Hungarian-American silent film actress, cardiopulmonary failure.
- Landis Gores, 71, American architect.
- Will Inge, 83, English cricketer.
- Carl Jensen, 81, Danish Olympic boxer (1932).
- Dezider Kardoš, 76, Czechoslovak composer.
- Narda Onyx, 59, Estonian-American actress.
- Herbert Sandberg, 82, German artist.
- Karl Schubert, 82, German Olympic swimmer (1928).
- Henry Tröndle, 85, German Olympic cyclist (1932).
- John D. Voelker, 87, American judge and author.

=== 19 ===
- Justus Buchler, 76, American philosopher.
- Godfred Bysheim, 81, Norwegian footballer.
- Richard Hawkey, 67, English cricket player.
- Bruno Kessler, 67, Italian politician.
- István Sugár, 86, Hungarian Olympic sprinter (1928).
- Russ Thomas, 66, American football player (Detroit Lions).
- Sunday Wilshin, 86, British actress and radio presenter.

=== 20 ===
- Billy Butler, 66, American guitarist.
- George Friedrichs, 51, American Olympic sailor (1968).
- George W. Grider, 78, American politician, member of the U.S. House of Representatives (1965–1967).
- David Marshall Lang, 66, British historian and academic.
- John Palmer MacBeth, 69, Canadian politician.
- Minatullah Rahmani, 77, Indian Islamic scholar.
- Nick Vanoff, 61, American theatre producer, cardiac arrest.

=== 21 ===
- Almé Z, 24, French sport horse.
- Nan Britton, 94, American secretary, mistress of Warren G. Harding.
- Vedat Dalokay, 63, Turkish politician and architect, traffic collision.
- Leo Fender, 81, American musician and businessman (Fender), Parkinson's disease.
- Oscar Heidenstam, 80, British bodybuilder.
- Bill Sweeney, 54, Canadian ice hockey player (New York Rangers).
- Harry Townley, 86, Australian rules footballer.

=== 22 ===
- Léon Balcer, 73, Canadian politician.
- Jimmy Boyd, 83, Scottish football player.
- Paul Engle, 82, American writer.
- Dave Guard, 56, American musician, lymphoma.
- Gloria Holden, 87, English-American actress, heart attack.
- Adrie Lasterie, 47, Dutch Olympic swimmer (1964).
- Albert McKinley Rains, 89, American politician, member of the U.S. House of Representatives (1945–1965).
- R. L. Ryan, 44, American actor (The Toxic Avenger, Birdy, Street Trash), heart attack.

=== 23 ===
- Elisaveta Bagriana, 97, Bulgarian poet.
- Susumu Fujita, 79, Japanese actor (The Hidden Fortress, The Human Condition, Mothra vs. Godzilla), liver cancer.
- Bill Gunn, 59, Australian football player.
- Guy Benton Johnson, 90, American sociologist.
- Mona Maris, 87, Argentine film actress, lung disease.
- Neta Snook Southern, 95, American aviation pioneer.
- Innozenz Stangl, 80, German Olympic gymnast (1936).
- Pauline Vanier, 92, Canadian humanitarian and academic.
- Lars Wolfbrandt, 62, Swedish Olympic sprinter (1948, 1952).

=== 24 ===
- Godfrey Bryan, 88, English cricket player.
- Doug Davies, 60, Australian rules footballer.
- Maudie Edwards, 84, Welsh actress (Welsh Rarebit, Coronation Street).
- Albert Järvinen, 40, Finnish guitarist, heart attack.
- Sir John Kerr, 76, Australian politician, governor-general (1974–1977), brain cancer.
- Max Truex, 55, American long-distance runner and Olympian (1956, 1960).
- Adrie Zwartepoorte, 74, Dutch Olympic cyclist (1936).

=== 25 ===
- Rusty Bryant, 61, American jazz musician.
- Robert Duis, 77, German Olympic basketball player (1936).
- Arthur Duncan, 78, Australian rules footballer.
- Margaret Hoffman, 79, American Olympic swimmer (1928, 1932).
- Vitaliy Holubyev, 65, Soviet football player.
- Eileen Joyce, 83, Australian pianist.
- Marcel Lefebvre, 85, French Roman Catholic prelate, bone cancer.
- Wolfgang Müller-Wiener, 67, German architecture historian, archaeologist and Byzantinist.
- Mohammed Ahmed Sadek, 73, Egyptian general.
- Sandy Williams, 84, American trombonist.

=== 26 ===
- Karel Burkert, 81, Czechoslovak footballer.
- Warren Chappell, 86–87, American illustrator and teacher, heart failure.
- Herbert Dörner, 60, German footballer.
- Riccardo Fellini, 70, Italian film actor.
- Paul Gayten, 71, American musician.
- Angus Charles Graham, 71, Welsh sinologist.
- Horse Hagerty, 85, American football player (Brooklyn Dodgers).
- Doug Herland, 39, American Olympic rower (1984).
- Henri Lhote, 88, French ethnographer and explorer.
- P. L. A. Somapala, 69, Sri Lankan singer.
- R. Sudarsanam, 76, Indian composer.

=== 27 ===
- Ralph Bates, 51, English actor, pancreatic cancer.
- Alfredo Campoli, 84, Italian-British violinist.
- Jack Davis, 74, Canadian politician.
- Heinrich Gerlach, 82, German soldier and author.
- Helmut Kronsbein, 76, German footballer.
- Aldo Ray, 64, American actor (Pat and Mike, The Marrying Kind, The Secret of NIMH), throat cancer.
- Hans-Henning Freiherr von Beust, 77, German Luftwaffe officer during World War II.

=== 28 ===
- Griffith Buck, 75–76, American horticulturist.
- Fernando Fernandes, 70, Portuguese Olympic hurdler (1952).
- Maude Hutchins, 92, American artist.
- Carlos Montalbán, 86, Mexican-American actor (The Harder They Fall, Bananas, The Out-of-Towners), heart failure.
- Lyall Wilkes, 76, English politician.

=== 29 ===
- Karl Aletter, 84, German Olympic rower (1928, 1932).
- Lee Atwater, 40, American political consultant, chairman of the Republican National Committee (1989–1991), brain cancer.
- Guy Bourdin, 62, French photographer, cancer.
- John Daniel Hayes, 89, American naval admiral and historian.
- Mikaela, 55, Spanish singer, leukemia.
- Hans Stark, 69, German war criminal.
- John Stradling Thomas, 65, Welsh politician.

=== 30 ===
- Günter Jochems, 62, German Olympic ice hockey player (1956).
- Silvia Monfort, 67, French actress, lung cancer.
- Sid Schacht, 73, American baseball player (St. Louis Browns, Boston Braves).
- Bud Taylor, 74, American golfer, suicide by carbon monoxide poisoning.
- Nikola Todev, 62, Bulgarian actor.
- Cheng Zihua, 85, Chinese politician.

=== 31 ===
- Emilian Bratu, 86, Romanian chemical engineer.
- John Carter, 61, American jazz musician.
- Stanley Diamond, 69, American poet and anthropologist.
- Consuelo Frank, 78, Mexican actress.
- Josip Jović, 21, Yugoslav Croatian police officer, shot.
- A. W. Lawrence, 90, British archaeologist.
