= Anthony Monday (series) =

American book series, 1978 to 1992, fantasy or horror for children or young adults

Anthony Monday is a fictional 14-year-old American boy featured in a series of four children's gothic horror novels by John Bellairs that were published from 1978 to 1992. Anthony and his friends generally overcome evil forces bent on ending the world. Alternatively, Anthony Monday is the book series, as in ISFDB. Brad Strickland, who has completed Bellairs' works posthumously and written new novels based on his characters, has noted that Anthony Monday was disliked by those in charge of publishing and any book ideas with Anthony as the character were rejected. This is why there has not been an Anthony Monday book since John Bellairs died.

== Novels in the Anthony Monday series ==
=== The Treasure of Alpheus Winterborn (1978) ===
Dedication: "For Keetah, who liked it when others didn't."

After stumbling upon a clue in the public library, Anthony searches for the treasure long rumored to have been hidden by a wealthy, eccentric citizen of their small town.

=== The Dark Secret of Weatherend (1984) ===
Dedication: "For Toby, a good editor and a good friend."

Fourteen-year-old Anthony Monday of Hoosac, Minnesota, and his friend Myra Eells, the Hoosac librarian, try to stop an evil wizard from turning the world into an icy wasteland.

=== The Lamp from the Warlock's Tomb (1988) ===
Anthony Monday and Myra Eells recover a magic lamp that was stolen from a warlock’s tomb and is spreading evil to further the wicked ends of the thief.

=== The Mansion in the Mist (1992) ===
While spending the summer in an old house on a desolate Canadian island owned by Emerson Eells, Anthony Monday and Myra Eells discover a chest that can transport them to another world, and a maniacal group who are plotting the destruction of people on Earth.

== Series bibliography ==
#	Title	Month	Year	Chapters	Pages	Writer	Illustrator
01	The Treasure of Alpheus Winterborn	May	1978	17	180	John Bellairs	Judith Gwyn Brown
02	The Dark Secret of Weatherend	Jul	1984	15	182	John Bellairs	Edward Gorey
03	The Lamp from the Warlock's Tomb	May	1988	14	168	John Bellairs	Edward Gorey
04	The Mansion in the Mist	Aug	1992	17	170	John Bellairs	Edward Gorey

== See also ==
- Lewis Barnavelt (series)
- Johnny Dixon (series)
