= Childermass =

Childermass can refer to:

- the feast of the Holy Innocents on December 28
- the first part (1928) of The Human Age, a trilogy by Wyndham Lewis
- Professor Roderick Random Childermass, a character in several books by John Bellairs
- John Childermass, Norrell's cunning and surly servant in the novel Jonathan Strange & Mr Norrell by Susanna Clarke
