= Phil Leeds =

American actor (1916–1998)

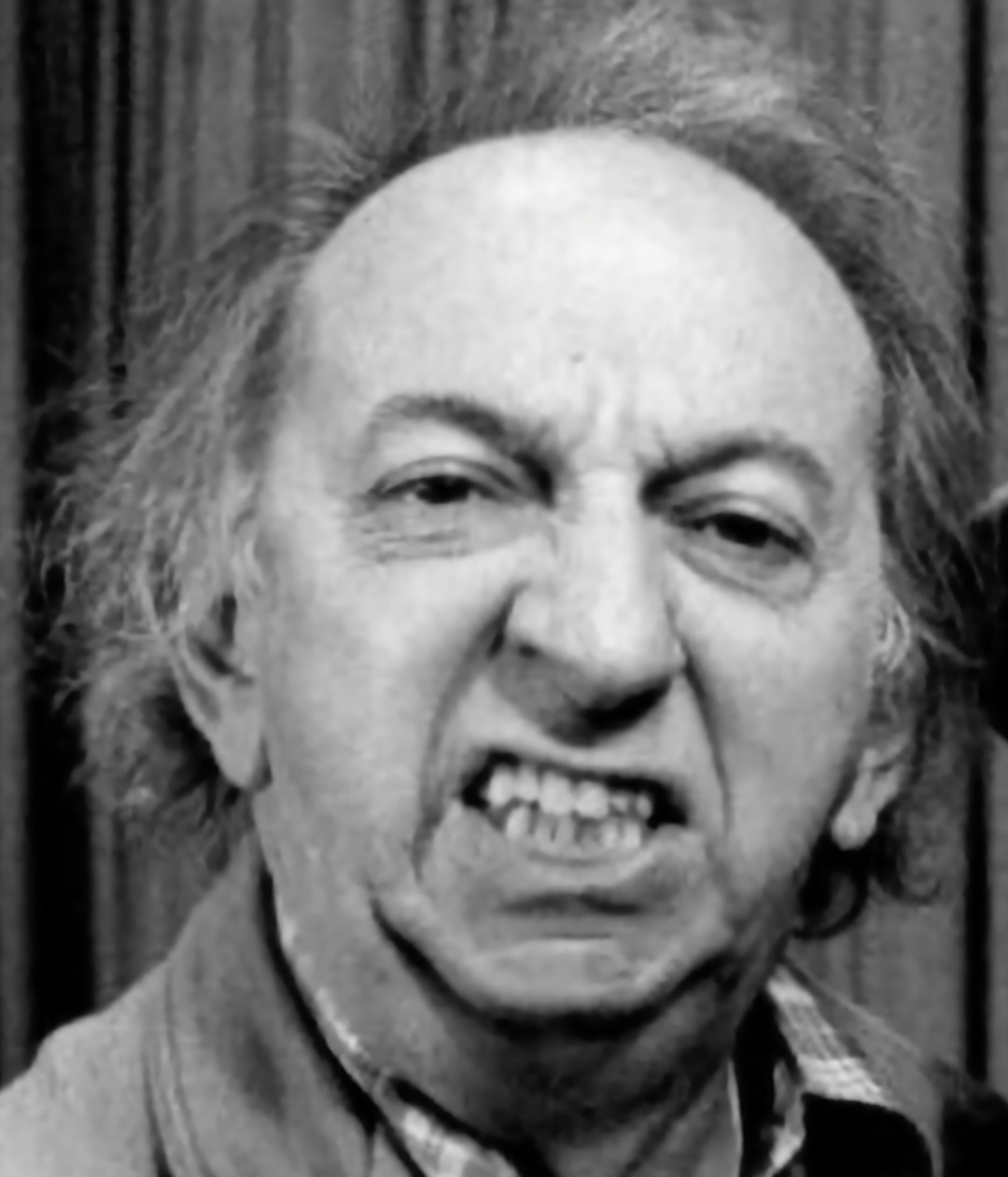
- Leeds in 1976
- Born: Philip Lebowitz; April 6, 1916; New York City, U.S.
- Died: August 16, 1998 (aged 82); Los Angeles, California, U.S.
- Occupation: Actor
- Years active: 1949–1998
- Spouse: Toby Brandt (m. 1934; died 1987)

Phil Leeds (April 6, 1916 – August 16, 1998) was an American character actor. He appeared in many movies and television series, including guest appearances on The Dick Van Dyke Show, Maude, The Monkees, Friends, Barney Miller, The Golden Girls, Everybody Loves Raymond, Boy Meets World and more.

== Early life ==
Leeds was born in New York City to Benjamin and Anna Lebowitz on April 6, 1916. His father was a post office clerk. Raised in the Bronx, he was a peanut vendor for some time at Yankee Stadium and Manhattan's Polo Grounds. He was a student at City College of New York and worked in Army special services in World War II.

== Career ==
He began his career as a standup comedian when he was in his 20s and then went on to appear in several films, including Rosemary's Baby, Ghost, and Beaches; and on sitcoms, such as, All in the Family, Three's Company, Night Court, Wings, Ally McBeal, Everybody Loves Raymond, The Larry Sanders Show, Barney Miller, Car 54, Where Are You?, The Patty Duke Show, The Monkees, The Odd Couple, Happy Days, ALF, Friends, Roseanne, Mad About You, The Dick Van Dyke Show, The Golden Girls, and Double Rush.

At age 80, he appeared on the 1996 Halloween episode of Roseanne, "Satan, Darling", in which Roseanne finds herself drawn into a parody version of Rosemary's Baby (Leeds had played Dr. Shand in the original 1968 film). His final role was a brief scene in Lost & Found (1999).

Leeds's Broadway credits included Of V We Sing (1942), Let Freedom Sing (1942), Make a Wish (1951), Can-Can (1953), The Matchmaker (1955), Romanoff and Juliet (1957), The Girls Against the Boys (1959), Christine (1960), Nowhere to Go But Up (1962), Sophie (1963), Here's Love (1963), Nobody Loves an Albatross (1963), Dinner at Eight (1966), Little Murders (1967), Inquest (1970), Two Gentlemen of Verona (1971), and Hurry, Harry (1972).

=== Blacklist ===
Leeds was blacklisted during the McCarthy era after pleading the fifth when examined by the House Un-American Activities Committee.

== Personal life ==
Leeds was married to fellow character actress Toby Brandt for 53 years (1934–1987) until her death. Leeds was Jewish.

== Death ==
Leeds died of pneumonia on August 16, 1998, at Cedars-Sinai Medical Center in Los Angeles at age 82. "Happy Trails", an episode of Ally McBeal, featured footage of his prior appearances on the show, eulogizing his character.

== Filmography ==
- Rosie (1960, TV pilot) as Rosie
- The Dick Van Dyke Show (1962, TV series) as Blackie Sorrell
- The Monkees (1966, TV series) as Bernie Class ("I've Got a Little Song Here")
- Mannix (1967) S1 E7 "Warning Live Blueberries" as "turned on" hippie guru Professor Wilson
- Rosemary's Baby (1968) as Dr. Shand
- Don't Drink the Water (1969) as Sam Blackwell
- The Odd Couple (1972) as Salty Pepper
- Maude (1973, TV series) as Principal Fishman
- Happy Days (TV series) as J. Jackie Silver
- Mastermind (1976) as Israeli Agent #2
- Won Ton Ton, the Dog Who Saved Hollywood (1976) as Dog Catcher
- Silent Movie (1976) as Waiter (uncredited)
- Three's Company (1979) as Lyle Wormwold
- History of the World, Part I (1981) as Chief Monk for the Spanish Inquisition
- CBS Children's Mystery Theatre (1981, episode The Haunting of Harrington House) as Uncle Max
- Frankenstein's Great Aunt Tillie (1984) as Banker Schlockmocker
- Night Court (1984, TV series) as Norm, God 2 and Arnold Koppelson
- Saturday the 14th Strikes Back (1988) as Leonard
- Beaches (1988) as Sammy Pinkers
- Cat Chaser (1989) as Jerry Shea
- Enemies, A Love Story (1989) as Pesheles
- Ghost (1990) as Emergency Room Ghost
- Coach (1990, TV series) as Man
- He Said, She Said (1991) as Mr. Spepk
- Soapdish (1991) as Old Man
- Frankie and Johnny (1991) as Mr. DeLeon
- All I Want for Christmas (1991) as Mr. Feld
- Mad About You (1992) as Vacky, a peanut vendor
- Matlock (1993, TV series) as Marty Willis
- Roseanne (TV Series) Tooth or Consequences (1993) as Jeffery, Leon Carp’s Boss
- Clean Slate (1994) as Landlord
- The Larry Sanders Show (1994) as Sid Bessel, Hank's agent
- Double Rush (1995, TV series) as "The Kid"
- ER (1995, TV series) as "Husband"
- Two Much (1996) as The Lincoln Brigade
- Friends (1996) as Mr. Adelman
- Everybody Loves Raymond (1996–1998) as Uncle Mel
- Wings (1996, TV series) as Lou
- Murphy Brown (1997, TV series) as Old Man
- Krippendorf's Tribe (1998) as Dr. Harvey
- Lost & Found (1999) as Mr. Elderly Couple (final film role)
- Boy Meets World as Phil/Milton
- Barney Miller as Arthur Bloom
- Ally McBeal (1997–2002, TV series) as Judge Happy Boyle
