= The Clue According To Sherlock Holmes =

1980 American TV episode

- Genre: Mystery
- Written by: Kimmer Ringwald; John Bellairs (uncredited); Sir Arthur Conan Doyle (uncredited)
- Directed by: Murray Golden
- Starring: Dody Goodman; Keith Coogan
- Country of origin: United States
- Original language: English

Production
- Producers: Diane Asselin; Paul Asselin
- Running time: 35 minutes

Original release
- Network: CBS
- Release: December 26, 1980

The Clue According to Sherlock Holmes (stylized as The Clue According To SHERLOCK HOLMES), also known as The Treasure of Alpheus T. Winterborn, is the first installment of the anthology series CBS Children's Mystery Theatre. It originally aired on December 26, 1980. It is directed by Murray Golden. It is based on the 1978 novel The Treasure of Alpheus Winterborn by John Bellairs.

== Plot summary ==
The episode is presented by Sherlock Holmes and his assistant Watson, who discuss that the ability to reason is the principle difference between men and beasts. As an example, they present the story of Anthony Monday, a boy who attempts to solve the mystery of a hidden treasure in his hometown.

== Cast ==
- Dody Goodman – Myra Eels
- Keith Coogan (billed as Keith Richards) – Anthony Monday
- Keith McConnell – Sherlock Holmes
- Laurie Main – Dr. Watson

== Production ==
The Clue According to SHERLOCK HOLMES was the first of five installments of The CBS Children's Mystery Theatre. The intent of the series was to teach children problem solving skills, specifically, the use of deductive reasoning. It was followed by The Haunting of Harrington House.

The story is based on part of a four-book series of children's novels featuring the character Anthony Monday, written by John Bellairs.
