= List of Lewis Barnavelt novels =

The Lewis Barnavelt series is a set of juvenile mystery fiction novels starring the fictional American boy Lewis Barnavelt.

The first three titles in the series were written by John Bellairs. Following his death in 1991, his estate commissioned Brad Strickland to write three more based on notes and manuscripts left by Bellairs. Strickland went on to write six more original novels in the series.

== List of novels ==
#	Title	Month	Year	Writer	Illustrator	Ref
01	The House with a Clock in Its Walls	Jun	1973	John Bellairs	Edward Gorey	
02	The Figure in the Shadows		1975	John Bellairs	Mercer Mayer	
03	The Letter, the Witch, and the Ring	Jan	1976	John Bellairs	Richard Egielski	
04	The Ghost in the Mirror	Apr	1993	John Bellairs and Brad Strickland	Edward Gorey	
05	The Vengeance of the Witch-finder	Sep	1993	John Bellairs and Brad Strickland	Edward Gorey	
06	The Doom of the Haunted Opera	Sep	1995	John Bellairs and Brad Strickland	Edward Gorey	
07	The Specter from the Magician's Museum	Mar	1998	Brad Strickland	Edward Gorey	
08	The Beast Under the Wizard's Bridge		2000	Brad Strickland	Edward Gorey	
09	The Tower at the End of the World	Sep	2001	Brad Strickland	S. D. Schindler	
10	The Whistle, the Grave, and the Ghost	Aug	2003	Brad Strickland	S. D. Schindler	
11	The House Where Nobody Lived	Oct	2006	Brad Strickland	Bart Goldman	
12	The Sign of the Sinister Sorcerer	Oct	2008	Brad Strickland	Bart Goldman	

== Film adaptations ==
#	Title	Year	Director	Distribution studio
01	The House with a Clock in Its Walls	2018	Eli Roth	Universal Pictures

== See also ==
- Johnny Dixon (series)
- Anthony Monday (series)
