= Johnny Dixon (series) =

Children's gothic horror series by John Bellairs

Johnny Dixon is a fictional American boy featured in a series of twelve children's gothic horror novels, 1983 to 1999, written by John Bellairs or his successor Brad Strickland. In each book, 12-year-old Johnny and his group of friends face and overcome evil forces usually bent on ending the world. Alternatively, Johnny Dixon is the book series ("Johnny Dixon and the Professor" in ISFDB).

The series is set in the early 1950s. Johnny lives with his paternal grandparents in fictional Duston Heights, Massachusetts. His mother has died of cancer some time prior to the beginning of the series, and his father is a fighter pilot in the United States Air Force during the Korean War. Johnny's best friend, history professor Roderick Childermass, lives across the street. In The Mummy, the Will and the Crypt, Johnny meets a boy his own age, Byron Q. "Fergie" Ferguson, at a Boy Scouts camp. Thenceforth, Johnny, Fergie, and Professor Childermass (who is typically referred to as simply "the professor") are the three principal characters of the series.

== Series bibliography ==
#	Title	Month	Year	Chapters	Pages	Writer	Illustrator
01	The Curse of the Blue Figurine	May	1983	12	200	John Bellairs	Edward Gorey
02	The Mummy, the Will, and the Crypt	Nov	1983	16	168	John Bellairs	Edward Gorey
03	The Spell of the Sorcerer's Skull	Nov	1984	11	170	John Bellairs	Edward Gorey
04	The Revenge of the Wizard's Ghost	Nov	1985	15	147	John Bellairs	Edward Gorey
05	The Eyes of the Killer Robot	Oct	1986	17	167	John Bellairs	Edward Gorey
06	The Trolley to Yesterday	Jul	1989	18	183	John Bellairs	Edward Gorey
07	The Chessmen of Doom	Nov	1989	16	155	John Bellairs	Edward Gorey
08	The Secret of the Underground Room	Mar	1990	13	127	John Bellairs	Edward Gorey
09	The Drum, the Doll, and the Zombie	Sep	1994	15	153	John Bellairs (outline) and Brad Strickland (written by) †	Edward Gorey
10	The Hand of the Necromancer	Sep	1996	18	168	Brad Strickland	Edward Gorey
11	The Bell, the Book, and the Spellbinder	Oct	1997	16	149	Brad Strickland	Edward Gorey
12	The Wrath of the Grinning Ghost	Sep	1999	15	166	Brad Strickland	Edward Gorey
13	The Stone, the Cipher, and the Shadows	Oct	2022	17	207	Brad Strickland	(not illustrated)

† One Johnny Dixon book was outlined by Bellairs and completed by Strickland.

== See also ==
- Lewis Barnavelt (series)
- Anthony Monday (series)
