= Finding ʻOhana =

2021 family adventure film directed by Jude Weng

- Official release poster
- Directed by: Jude Weng
- Written by: Christina Strain
- Produced by: Ian Bryce
- Starring: Kea Peahu; Alex Aiono; Lindsay Watson; Owen Vaccaro; Kelly Hu; Branscombe Richmond; Chris Parnell; Marc Evan Jackson; Ricky Garcia; Ke Huy Quan
- Cinematography: Cort Fey
- Edited by: Priscilla Nedd Friendly
- Music by: Joseph Trapanese
- Production company: Ian Bryce Productions
- Distributed by: Netflix
- Release date: January 29, 2021
- Running time: 123 minutes
- Country: United States
- Language: English

Finding ʻOhana is a 2021 American family adventure film by Jude Weng in her directorial debut and written by Christina Strain. The film stars Kea Peahu, Alex Aiono, Lindsay Watson, Owen Vaccaro and Kelly Hu. This marks Ke Huy Quan's return to acting. It premiered on Netflix on January 29, 2021.

== Plot ==
Hawaiian siblings Pili and Ioane "E" were New York–raised in Brooklyn. An avid geocaching fan, she wins a competition that earns her free tuition to a summer camp in the Catskills. Pili can't go in the end as they temporarily relocate from New York to Oʻahu with their mother Leilani to help her father, Kimo as his health and financial issues are becoming serious.

As Pili is so into geocaching, her malaise at being separated from her beloved New York is assuaged by secretly liberating an old diary from her grandfather's art studio, set up in an old bus. Just as she's sneaking off the bus, she meets local boy Casper, who helps cover for her.

That night, as Pili is trying to secretly read the diary, E catches her. He explains the term Night Marchers to her, trying to scare her, explaining they are ghosts of fallen warriors who protect the island.

Meanwhile, E is distracted from his own search for a better internet signal by local girl Hana, who is Casper's friend. She, on the other hand, is not impressed by his attitude towards the younger kids.

In the diary of the ship the Peruvian's quartermaster Monks, he documented Robinson and Brown's excursion on the island. The privateers had mutinied, burned their ship, and taken the treasure ashore. Monks stayed to protect the treasure while his superiors died. He gave the diary to Pili's ancestors for saving his life.

Kimo catches Pili with the diary. Initially angry, he ends up taking the enthusiastic girl to see some of the landmarks in it. He falls, breaking a rib. While Leilani is distracted with Kimo in the hospital, Pili and Casper sneak off to seek the lost pirate treasure. E and Hana follow close behind.

They end up having to follow the instructions in the diary as all four slide inwards of a cave too far to back out. They have to crawl through a narrow tunnel called "The Jaws of Death", which is lined with stalactites. Fearing a deadly spider, E hurries frantically out of the tunnel, leaving behind the ship journal as it is inside Casper's backpack as it collapses. Finding a mini rope bridge over a lava-filled crevice, they realize it is too deteriorated to cross, but Pili and Casper inch around it on a narrow ledge. E helps Hana maneuver around it, partially by distracting her singing a favorite song.

E confides in Casper that the brown violin spider bit him, leaving him with a huge blister, possibly indicating necrosis. To not alarm the others, he covers it with duct tape. Arriving to a pool, they realize the next tunnel is filled with rain water. Pili gets through it piggybacking on E.

Arriving at "ground zero", Pili and Casper go in search of the treasure while E talks with Hana. He tries to convince her to send in her application to Juilliard, but she fears it might change her too much. Pili and Casper examine the complex pulley and rope system they had remembered from the journal. Realizing one of the counterweights is down, they deduce they can access the treasure room by putting all of their weight on the severed rope.

Once in, as they all are collecting large amounts of gold and jewels, Hana spots a religious statuette indicating they are in a type of tomb. Realizing the treasure is an offering, she insists they can't take anything without waking the Night Marchers. When E refuses to believe it, they awaken.

All four drop their treasure and head for the pools below using the banyan roots. Everyone makes it, although E has to be resuscitated. As they move away from the mountain Leilani catches up with them. The Night Marchers approach them as they seek shelter in a shed. Pili makes an offering with a few treasures she'd kept. They are bowing down and averting their eyes when their father Kua steps out. He had died 11 years ago while enlisted. Leilani, Pili, and E have a brief moment before Kua and the other Night Marchers disappear into the ocean.

Leilani calls a family meeting and proposes they decide as a group if they all stay in Hawaiʻi or go back to Brooklyn, they decide to stay and start to live a better life.

== Cast ==
- Kea Peahu as Pili, a tomboyish and adventurous girl who is loane's younger sister
- Alex Aiono as Ioane "E", Pili's older brother
- Lindsay Watson as Hana, a local girl who E has feelings for
- Owen Vaccaro as Casper, a nerdy but big-hearted boy who is friends with Hana
- Kelly Hu as Leilani
- Branscombe Richmond as Kimo
- Ke Huy Quan as Kioki
- Brad Kalilimoku as Kua Kawena
- Chris Parnell as Brown
- Marc Evan Jackson as Robinson
- Ricky Garcia as Monks
- Ryan Higa as Ryan
- Mapuana Makia as Nurse Tina
- X Mayo as Melody
- Kyndra Sanchez as Yoli Greenburg

== Production ==
In September 2019, it was announced Netflix had picked up the rights to Jude Weng's feature film debut. Christina Strain would write, with the film being "a Goonies-esque adventure movie starring mostly Datas". Ian Bryce of Ian Bryce Productions would produce the film with Irene Yeung and JJ Hook executive producing and Katie Malott associate producing. Kea Peahu and Alex Aiono would star as the two main siblings with Marc Evan Jackson, Lindsay Watson, Owen Vaccaro, Kelly Hu, Ricky Garcia, Ryan Higa, Mapuana Makia, Brad Kalilimoku, X Mayo, and Kyndra Sanchez in the ensemble cast, as well as original The Goonies star Ke Huy Quan in his first role in 19 years.

Finding ʻOhana was shot in Brooklyn, Hawaii, Korea, and in the Dominican Republic.

== Reception ==
On review aggregator Rotten Tomatoes, the film holds an approval rating of 81% based on 21 critic reviews, with an average rating of 7/10. According to Metacritic, which sampled seven critics and calculated a weighted average score of 69 out of 100, the film received "generally favorable" reviews.
