= TimeGate =

Science fiction convention

- Status: Active
- Genre: Science fiction
- Venue: Holiday Inn Select
- Location: Atlanta, Georgia
- Country: United States
- Inaugurated: 2005
- Organizer: Stargate Atlanta; Atlanta Gallifreyans
- Website: http://www.timegatecon.org

TimeGate is an Atlanta-based science fiction convention dedicated to Doctor Who and Stargate fandom, though general SF/F interests are also represented.

== History ==
TimeGate began life as a one-day mini-con held March 26, 2005, at a local Elks Lodge. The Lodge had already been rented for another event, which fell through. Since the deposit on the Lodge was non-refundable, the presidents of Atlanta Gallifreyans and Stargate Atlanta made the decision to plan an alternate event, one dedicated to Stargate and Doctor Who. Even with only two weeks to plan and promote the new event, 80 people attended.

That year, two additional TimeGates were held, in July and in November. Each time, a slight change to the formula was tried, while the basic 'ingredients' remained unchanged.

2006 saw only one TimeGate, but it drew record attendance and was the first to feature professional guests. The following year TimeGate V was the first to feature guests directly related to the two focus shows: Louis Robinson, a singer-songwriter who had been a film editor on Doctor Who in the 1970s, and Keith Adams, who designs special effects shots for the current Stargate shows.

With attendance having grown to the point where the original venue became too small, TimeGate has scheduled a move to a hotel location and a transition to a full-fledged full-weekend convention in 2008. The 2008 convention featured John Levene and Tony Amendola and other notable guests including Louis Robinson and Dr. Kevin Grazier.

In 2009, TimeGate reached out to fans again inviting Mary Tamm (Romana of Doctor Who) and Brad Greenquist as Guests of Honour and expanding programming to three portals, or tracks. The Gallifrey (Doctor Who Universe), the Abydos (the Stargate Universe), and the Otherworlds portal which focused on other genres such as Star Trek, Star Wars and science. Attendance in 2009 reached a new high with over 400 people attending.

In 2010, TimeGate expanded the function space and their programming, adding in a fourth track for Main programming, and new space for gaming and the video room. Also, the cabaret, started in 2008, brought in the most money ever for Atlanta Habitat for Humanity.

== Past conventions ==
- TimeGate I – Held March 26, 2005 at the Elks Lodge #78 in Tucker, Georgia. By sheer coincidence, this was the same day that the first episode of the new Doctor Who series aired on BBC. Notable programming included Stargate panels, screenings of select Stargate episodes, a Stargate baby shower, Doctor Who panels, documentaries, and a screening of the first episode of the new Doctor Who series. The event also featured live music by Hyperdrive, a buffet, a costume contest, plus open and tournament gaming.
- TimeGate II – Held July 9, 2005 at the Elks Lodge. Programming expanded with more gaming, more videos, more panels, a Hyperdrive concert, and a group game of "Scene It."
- TimeGate III – Held November 19, 2005 at the Elks Lodge. Notable new programming included fannish Jeopardy!, a costume contest, and a Klingon feast.
- TimeGate IV – Held October 7, 2006 at the Elks Lodge. Notable programming included a performance by the Atlanta Radio Theatre Company, a workshop on Dalek building, a LaserTag event, and a Team Trivia event.
- TimeGate V – Held July 14, 2007 at the Elks Lodge. Guests included Louis Robinson, former BBC Film Editor who'd worked on many shows including Doctor Who, and Keith Adams, Visual Effects Designer for both Stargate series. Notable programming included Prof. Satyre's Sci-Fried Side Show.
- TimeGate VI – Held May 23–26, 2008 at the Holiday Inn Select Perimeter. Guests included John Levene, who played Sergeant Benton on Doctor Who; Tony Amendola, who played Master Bra'tac on Stargate SG-1; Dr. Kevin Grazier from NASA's JPL and science advisor on Battlestar Galactica and Eureka; Lars Pearson, owner of Mad Norwegian Press, publisher of Doctor Who reference guides; Louis Robinson, former BBC Film Editor who'd worked on many shows including Doctor Who; Fantasy author Jana Oliver; and Game developer and publisher David Harmer. Notable programming included performances by the Atlanta Radio Theater Company, Prof. Satyre's Sci-Fried Side Show, and Hyperdrive.
- TimeGate VII – Held May 22–24, 2009 at the Holiday Inn Select Perimeter. Guests included Mary Tamm, who played Romana on Doctor Who; Brad Greenquist, who played Dr. Keffler on Stargate SG-1; Terrance Dicks, whose body of work for Doctor Who began in 1968 as a script editor; Lars Pearson, owner of Mad Norwegian Press, publisher of Doctor Who reference guides; Louis Robinson, former BBC Film Editor who worked on many shows including Doctor Who and emceed the cabaret; Fantasy author Jana Oliver; and young adult authors Berta Platas and Michelle Roper. Notable programming included video commentary by guests, a cabaret, and a masquerade.
- TimeGate VIII – Held May 28–30, 2010 at the Holiday Inn Select Perimeter. Guests included Dominic Glynn, Carmen Argenziano, Diana Botsford, David Read, Louis Robinson, Kelly Yates and young adult authors Berta Platas and Michelle Roper. Notable programming included video commentary by guests, a cabaret, and a masquerade.
- TimeGate IX – May 27–29, 2011 at the Holiday Inn Select, Atlanta-Perimeter. Guests included: Sophie Aldred, "Ace" on Doctor Who 1987 to 1989; Doctor Who screenwriter and novelist Andrew Cartmel; Doctor Who writer Ben Aaronovitch (Remembrance of the Daleks and Battlefield); Comic book artist Kelly Yates (Doctor Who: The Forgotten); Stargate: Atlantis Novelist Melissa Scott; Former Doctor Who film editor and BBC writer / producer Louis Robinson; and Gateworld representative David Read.
- TimeGate X – May 25–27, 2012 at the Holiday Inn Select, Atlanta-Perimeter. Guests included David Nykl (Stargate Atlantis), Paul Kasey & Paul Marc Davis (Doctor Who, Torchwood, Sarah Jane Adventures), Nalini Krishan (Star Wars: Attack of the Clones), Debbie Viguié (Young Adult Fantasy novelist), Jackson Pearce (Young Adult Fantasy novelist) and John Jackson Miller (Star Wars novelist and comic book writer).
- TimeGate XI – May 24–26, 2013 at the Holiday Inn Select, Atlanta-Perimeter. Guests included Colin Baker and Andrew Cartmel.
- TimeGate XII – May 23–25, 2014 at the Holiday Inn Select, Atlanta. Guests included Terrance Dicks and Gareth David-Lloyd.
- TimeGate XIII – May 22–24, 2015 at the Marriott Century Center. Guests included Michelle Gomez, Katy Manning, Nick Robatto (Dr. Who props master) and Dr. Kevin Grazier.

TimeGate's next convention was going to be held on May 27–29, 2016. Announced guests included: Paul McGann, Terry Molloy, Nicholas Briggs, and Jason Haigh-Ellery (Executive Producer, Big Finish Productions).
