= The Treasure of Alpheus Winterborn =

1978 children's novel by John Bellairs

- First edition
- Author: John Bellairs
- Illustrator: Judith Gwyn Brown
- Cover artist: Judith Gwyn Brown
- Series: Anthony Monday
- Publisher: Houghton Mifflin Harcourt
- English publication date: 1978
- Media type: Print
- Pages: 180pp
- ISBN: 0-15-289936-7
- OCLC: 3516181
- LC Class: PZ7.B413Tr
- Followed by: The Dark Secret of Weatherend

The Treasure of Alpheus Winterborn is a 1978 children's mystery novel written by John Bellairs and illustrated by Judith Gwyn Brown. The book was adapted for television in 1980 by CBS.

== Plot summary ==
Anthony Monday and his family live in the fictional town of Hoosac, Minnesota, in the 1950s. While not poor, the family has been suffering from financial difficulties. To make matters worse, Anthony's father suffers a series of heart attacks, keeping him from working and further straining the family's resources.

Desperate to help with expenses, Anthony accepts a part-time job from Myra Eells, the elderly librarian of Hoosac Public Library. Working at the library allows Anthony to earn a little money, as well as learn more about Alpheus Winterborn, the wealthy and eccentric man who built the library.

Winterborn was rumored to have found something on an archeological dig many years before, and hidden it for safekeeping inside the library. Despite being told that no one actually believes the tale to be true, Anthony cannot resist becoming intrigued.

During his chores around the building, Anthony ultimately finds a clue hinting that the treasure does exist and, if the clues written by Winterborn himself are followed correctly, they will lead the one to the prize. Anthony knows that finding the treasure will result in money that can help with family finances. But soon Anthony runs afoul of the greedy bank vice-president, Hugo Philpotts, a descendant of the Winterborn family. The two commence dueling searches for the treasure.

Eventually, during a fierce storm, Anthony finds the treasure, a golden statue worth hundreds of thousands of dollars. He sells the statue, giving half of the money to Ms. Eells and keeping half for himself.

== Television adaptation ==
In 1980, as part of the series CBS Children's Mystery Theatre, the story was adapted for television.
