= Atlanta Radio Theatre Company =

The Atlanta Radio Theatre Company. (ARTC) is a 501(c)(3) non-profit organization dedicated to preserving, promoting, performing, and educating people about the art of audio theatre (radio drama).

== Activities ==
ARTC performs live audio drama at a wide variety of events, often with a very specific focus on science fiction, Horror or Fantasy. They have been performing roughly 24 years, and have performed at such notable venues as DragonCon, Mythic Journeys, Stone Mountain, and the World Fantasy Convention.

Some of their more noteworthy adaptations include several works by H. P. Lovecraft including The Call of Cthulhu, The Dunwich Horror, and At the Mountains of Madness. They have also performed adaptations of works by H. G. Wells including The Invisible Man, The Island of Dr. Moreau, and The Time Machine. However, several authors who do not have work in the public domain have also given permission either personally or through their estate, including Robert A. Heinlein for adaptations of All You Zombies, The Man Who Traveled in Elephants and The Menace From Earth; Margaret Weis and Tracy Hickman for an adaptation of Lord Durndrun's Party; Henry Lee Forest's Special Order and James P. Hogan's Zap Thy Neighbor.

Over the years, various members of ARTC have participated in or taught classes for various workshops, including the MidWest Radio Theatre Workshop and its successor organization National Audio Theatre Festival, The Himan Brown Workshop at the University of Georgia, and in Macon and Cartersville, Georgia. Their writers continue to teach radio drama writing at science fiction conventions around the country.

== History ==
A brief overview of the history of the Atlanta Radio Theatre Company.

=== Founding (1984-1992) ===
ARTC was founded in 1984 by radio personality William L. Brown and actor/director Patrick Stansbury. They procured underwriting from a local bank to sponsor a weekly, one-hour program on WGST-AM. The first shows were produced in Brown's home studio. Atlanta playwright Thomas E. Fuller was enlisted as principal writer, and numerous actors from the local theatrical community were cast in the productions. Soon Henry Howard, owner of Audio Craft, made his facility available to ARTC and came on board as a producer. ARTC produced a full 13-week schedule for WGST in summer of 1984. That fall ARTC moved to WABE-FM, the local Public Radio station, and ran a full season of thirteen shows. Then the next year they produced the SouthernAire Workshop for Peach State Public Radio (now Georgia Public Broadcasting. Most of the shows were performed "live" or "live-on-tape" in-studio.

In the summer of 1987 ARTC began performing live at science fiction conventions. Their first live performance was at the first DragonCon. The play was H. P. Lovecraft's "The Call of Cthulhu" as adapted by Gerald W. Page.

Also in 1987 ARTC introduced the Centauri Express Audio Magazine—the first audio magazine. It ran for five issues and contained plays, reviews of other audio products, and news of interest to the SF audience. Centauri Express was funded with a grant from the 1986 World Science Fiction Convention, ConFederation, held in Atlanta.

=== Explosion (1992-2002) ===
Under Fuller's leadership, ARTC established a troupe of professional and semi-professional actors, writers, directors, and technicians, to create live and in-studio productions of audio drama.

In 1993 and 1994, they began performing monthly at a coffee house in the Little Five Points district in Atlanta. This theater experience allowed for the development of new writers, gave the actors more radio experience, and allowed for experimentation with new formats and styles. These coffee house shows created many new stand-alone plays as well as radio series in the style of the programs from the golden age of radio.

After the coffee house closed, the live performance troupe continued to find venues for live audio theatre. They performed at a few live music venues, the Decatur Arts Festival, Callanwolde, and several libraries and bookstores. They also expanded the number of science fiction conventions at which they performed.

Even during this period ARTC continued to create in-studio audio drama on cassette tape and eventually CDs. Their 1996 production of H. G. Wells' The Island of Doctor Moreau won a silver Mark Time award for excellence in science fiction audio drama. It was the first of several awards from the Mark-Time award committee to the Atlanta Radio Theatre Company.

In 1995, ARTC's first web page was posted.

For several years during this period ARTC performed live every Halloween night on Peach State Public Radio – performing and broadcasting from one of the Georgia Public Television studios.

Starting in 1996 with permission from Mrs. Virginia Heinlein to adapt her husband's The Menace from Earth into an audio play, the company has continued to negotiate with contemporary writers for permission to create adaptations of their work. Among the writers whose work has been adapted by ARTC are: Robert A. Heinlein, James P. Hogan, Brad Linaweaver, Gerald W. Page, John Ringo, Brad Strickland, and Margaret Weis and Tracy Hickman.

=== Post-Fuller (2002-present) ===
In November 2002 Fuller died from a heart attack. The Atlanta Radio Theatre Company had lost its leader, its head writer, and its voice. ARTC attracted new writers, new actors, and new leaders. It continued to expand the number of places where it performed and new productions.

ARTC continued to perform at many science fiction conventions. Additionally it began searching for a permanent stage home for regular performances. From 2002 through 2003 it mounted several productions at Stone Mountain Park. Then in 2006 it began a full theatrical season at Stage Door Players in Dunwoody, Georgia. In 2009 it moved its theatrical home to the Academy Theatre in Avondale Estates, Georgia.

In August 2006, ARTC began to podcast programming gathered from previous live performances. The podcasts include new material, old fan favorites, and rare performances.

== Studio Recordings ==
=== The Dean's List ===
Stories by Robert A. Heinlein. Adapted with permission of Mrs. Virginia Heinlein.

- The Man Who Traveled in Elephants
  by Robert A. Heinlein
  adapted by Brad Linaweaver
- The Menace From Earth
  by Robert A. Heinlein
  adapted by William Alan Ritch
- Solution Unsatisfactory
  by Robert A. Heinlein
  adapted by Daniel S. Taylor

=== SF by Gaslight ===
Classic 19th century literature brought to life.

- The Brides of Dracula
  by Thomas E. Fuller
  inspired by Dracula by Bram Stoker
- Hour of the Wolf
  by Thomas E. Fuller
- The Island of Doctor Moreau
  by H. G. Wells
  adapted by Thomas E. Fuller
- The Passion of Frankenstein
  by Thomas E. Fuller
  inspired by Frankenstein by Mary Shelley
- The Strange Case of Doctor Jekyll and Mister Hyde
  by Robert Louis Stevenson
  adapted by Daniel S. Taylor
- The Time Machine
  by H. G. Wells
  adapted by Thomas E. Fuller?

=== Into the Labyrinth ===
Original horror and dark fantasy

- All Hallows' Moon
  by Thomas E. Fuller
- Ghost Dance & Armada Rising
  by Thomas E. Fuller
- The Last Dragon to Avondale & Chronos Beach
  by Thomas E. Fuller
- Special Order
  by Henry Lee Forest
  adapted by Daniel S. Taylor
- A Case of Abuse
  by Ron N. Butler

=== H. P. Lovecraft ===
Stories by H. P. Lovecraft.

- At the Mountains of Madness
  by H. P. Lovecraft
  adapted by Brad Strickland
- The Call of C'thulhu
  by H. P. Lovecraft
  adapted by Ron N. Butler
- The Color Out of Space
  by H. P. Lovecraft
  adapted by Ron N. Butler
- The Dunwich Horror
  by H. P. Lovecraft
  adapted by Thomas E. Fuller
- The Rats in the Walls
  by H. P. Lovecraft
  adapted by Brad Strickland
- The Shadow Over Innsmouth
  by H. P. Lovecraft
  adapted by Gregory Nicoll

=== H. Beam Piper ===
- He Walked Around the Horses
  by H. Beam Piper
  adapted by Ron N. Butler
- Omnilingual
  by H. Beam Piper
  adapted by Ron N. Butler
- Time and Time Again
  by H. Beam Piper
  adapted by Ron N. Butler

=== Centauri Express ===
The first audio magazine.

- Adventures on the Backroads of Time
  Terry Sanders and Clair Whitworth Kiernan
- The Happy Man
  by Gerald W. Page
- The Competitor
  by Brad Linaweaver
  adapted by William Alan Ritch

=== An ARTC Christmas ===
Christmas stories and other seasonal celebrations.

- An Atlanta Christmas
  by Thomas E. Fuller
  adapted by Daniel S. Taylor

=== Aurora ===
Romance.

- The Hoyden
  by Berta Platas
- Kissed by a Stranger
  by Fiona Karanina Leonard

== Live performances ==
=== Conventions ===
- 221B Con 2015
- AnachroCon 2011, 2013
- Antares 1995
- AtomiCon 1993
- Birmingham Radio Theater Workshop 2001
- Burroughs Dum-Dum 1994
- ConFederation 1986
- Costume-Con 2004
- DeepSouthCon 1994, 1996
- DragonCon 1987–2015
- Friends of Old-Time Radio 1997
- Gaylaxicon 2007 (in Atlanta)
- Libertarian Party of Georgia Convention 2001
- Heinlein Centential 2007
- LibertyCon 2005–2011
- NecronomiCon 1994–1998
- OASIS 1998–1999
- PhoenixCon 1993
- Mythic Journeys 2006
- Sci-Fi Summer 2001–2006
- Southeast Antique Radio Show 1998
- TimeGate 2006, 2008
- Under Construction 1994–1995
- World Fantasy Convention 1992
- World Horror Convention 1995, 1999

=== Theatres ===
- Cartersville Radio Theater 1994
- Dad's Garage Theatre Company 2002
- Little Five Points Coffeehouse 1993–1994
- Stage Door Players 2006–2007
- Academy Theatre [2008–present]

=== Other Venues ===
- Atlanta Science Fiction Society 2002
- Callanwolde 1993
- Camp Willoway 2006
- Eddie's Attic 1997
- Gwinnett History Museum 1999
- Props Restaurant 1994
- Stone Mountain Park 2002–2005, 2007

==== Bookstores and Libraries ====
- Atlanta Public Library 1995, 1996, 1997
- Barnes & Noble Bookstore 1995–2007
- Tut's Book Emporium 2006–2007

==== Schools ====
- DeKalb School of the Arts 2004
- Parkview High School 2000–2001
- Georgia Tech DramaTech 2000
- University of Georgia, Athens 1994

==== Special events ====
- Decatur Arts Festival 1996–2000
- Echo Lounge 2000
- Fellowship of Reason 2003
- Festival of Trees 2001
- Somber Reptile 2000

== People ==
=== Writers ===
A list of writers whose work has been adapted for audio by ARTC.

- Robert A. Heinlein
- L. Ron Hubbard
- James P. Hogan
- Rudyard Kipling
- Katherine Kurtz
- Brad Linaweaver
- H. P. Lovecraft
- Greg Nicoll
- Gerald W. Page
- H. Beam Piper
- Terry Pratchett
- John Ringo
- Mary Shelley
- Robert Louis Stevenson
- Bram Stoker
- Brad Strickland
- A. E. van Vogt
- Margaret Weis and Tracy Hickman
- H. G. Wells

=== Celebrities ===
Celebrities who have acted on stage or in the studio with ARTC.

- Matt Anderson
  DragonCon 2004 – "Rory Rammer, Space Marshal: Slaves of the Zombie-Tron" by Ron N. Butler
- Robert Asprin
  LibertyCon 2005
- Michael Brady
  DragonCon (many, many years)
  Sci-Fi Summer
- Peter David
  DragonCon 2001 – "Solution Unsatisfactory" by Robert A. Heinlein
- John Rhys-Davies
  DragonCon 2001 – "Guards, Guards" by Terry Pratchett
- Harlan Ellison
  DragonCon 1990 – "The Rats in the Walls" by H. P. Lovecraft
  DragonCon 1998 – "The Man Who Traveled in Elephants" by Robert A. Heinlein
  ... and in the studio production.
  DragonCon 2004 – "The Shadow Over Innsmouth" by H. P. Lovecraft
- Lisa Getto
  Sci-Fi Summer, several years
- Jonathan Harris
  DragonCon 1998 – "Rory Rammer, Space Marshal: The Cosmic Cycloplex" by Ron N. Butler
- Richard Hatch
  DragonCon 2005 – "The Weapons Shop" by A. E. van Vogt
- James Charles Leary
  DragonCon 2004 -
- Tamara Morton
  DragonCon 2004 – "The Menace from Earth" by Robert A. Heinlein
- Ted Raimi
  DragonCon 2000 – "Rory Rammer, Space Marshal: Queen of the Spaceways" by Ron N. Butler
- Michael Sinelnikoff
  DragonCon 2000 – "Most Pierced Man" by Ron N. Butler
- Jewel Staite
  DragonCon 2004 – "The Menace from Earth" by Robert A. Heinlein
- Claire Stansfield
  DragonCon 2000 – "Rory Rammer, Space Marshal: Queen of the Spaceways" by Ron N. Butler
- Brinke Stevens
  NecronomiCon 1996 – "The Menace from Earth" by Robert A. Heinlein
  DragonCon 1998 – "The Man Who Traveled in Elephants" by Robert A. Heinlein
  The studio production of "A Real Babe" by Brad Linaweaver
- Robert Trebor
  DragonCon 1999 – "Rory Rammer, Space Marshal: The Phantom Menace" by Ron N. Butler
- Alexandra Tydings
  DragonCon 2000 – "Rory Rammer, Space Marshal: Queen of the Spaceways" by Ron N. Butler

== Awards ==
2020 Norman Corwin Award given to The Atlanta Radio Theatre Company by the National Audio Theater Festivals for excellence in audio drama.

Awards are given by the American Society For Science Fiction Audio for the best science fiction, fantasy, and horror audio dramas of the year. There are two awards: the Mark Time Awards for the best science fiction and the Ogle Awards for the best fantasy/horror.

- 2004 Mark-Time Special Award – Best Adaptation
  "The Menace From Earth" by Robert A. Heinlein,
  adapted by William Alan Ritch
- 1998 Ogle Silver Award
  "All Hallows Moon" by Thomas E. Fuller.
- 1997 Mark-Time Special Award, Best Horror-Fantasy Production
  "The Brides of Dracula" by Thomas E. Fuller.
- 1996 Mark-Time Silver Award
  "The Island of Dr. Moreau" by H. G. Wells
  adapted by Thomas E. Fuller.
