= Of V We Sing =

1942 Broadway musical revue

Of V We Sing is a Broadway musical revue with lyrics by Alfred Hayes and a book by Mel Tolkin, Sam Locke, and Al Geto. It premiered at the Elysee Theatre on February 11, 1942, and ran for 76 performances before closing on April 25 that year. The show marked the Broadway debuts of both Betty Garrett and Phil Leeds.

== Production ==
The show was originally put on by the American Youth Theatre under the name V For Victory in September 1941 at the Malin Studio Theater. By October, it was running under the name Of V We Sing.

The Broadway production was directed by Perry Bruskin and produced by Alexander H. Cohen.

A condensed version of the show, with a cast of ten people, played at the La Conga Club in New York City for two weeks in September 1942. Four members of the original cast performed in this version: Eleanor Bagley, Lee Barrie, Connie Baxter, and Adele Jerome. New cast members were Kay Dowd, Ty Kearney, Ray Long, Marty Ritt, and Shelley Winters.

== Synopsis ==
The show consisted of two acts of songs and sketches. Some of the show's content addressed World War II, while other parts touched on topics closer to home, like unions, Mother's Day, and the Brooklyn Dodgers.

=== Act I ===
- "You Can't Fool the People"
- "News Story"
- "NBC Goes to Broadcast"
- "Sisters Under the Skin"
- "Rhumba"
- "One Way Passage"
- "Red, White and Blues"
- "Mother Love"
- "Brooklyn Cantata"
- "Take a Poem"
- "Victory Conga"

=== Act II ===
- "Priorities"
- "News Story (Again)"
- "Ivan the Terrible"
- "Queen Esther"
- "Hy'a Joe"
- "Gertie, the Stool Pigeon's Daughter"
- "You've Got to Appease with a Strip Tease"
- "Belinda Blue"
- "We Have a Date"
- "Juke Box"
- "Prologue to Finale"
- "Of V We Sing"

== Broadway cast ==
- Eleanor Bagley
- Lee Barrie
- Connie Baxter
- Perry Bruskin
- Curt Conway
- Lou Cooper
- Diane Davis
- John Fleming
- Ann Garlan
- Betty Garrett
- Adele Jerome
- Phil Leeds
- Byron Milligan
- Daniel Nagrin
- Susanne Remos
- Robert Sharron
- Letty Stever
- Mary Titus
- John Wynn
- Buddy Yarus
