= St. Fidgeta and Other Parodies =

Book by John Bellairs

St. Fidgeta & Other Parodies
- Title page for St. Fidgeta and Other Parodies (1966)
- Author: John Bellairs
- Illustrator: Marilyn Fitschen
- Cover artist: Marilyn Fitschen
- Language: English
- Publisher: Macmillan Publishers
- Publication date: 1966
- Publication place: United States
- Media type: Print (Hardback)
- Pages: 123 pp

St. Fidgeta & Other Parodies, a mostly uncategorizable spoof of 1960s Catholicism, was the first published work by John Bellairs. The original St. Fidgeta article first appeared in the Chicago-based Catholic magazine, the Critic. It describes the putative life of fictional Catholic saint St. Fidgeta ("Quieter of the giggly / Steadier of the wiggly"), a seven year-old martyr and the patroness of unmanageable children. A subsequent book appeared with eleven other vignettes that offered sardonic comment on the Vatican II era. Long out of print, St. Fidgeta was re-released in the 2009 anthology, Magic Mirrors, published by the New England Science Fiction Association press.

== Author's Note ==
The work includes the following: "I would like to thank my friends, Dale and Marilyn Fitschen, for all their help. They suffered through endless readings from the Urtext and gave me many suggestions and ideas. I would also like to thank my friend Bernard Kent Markwell, to whom St. Fidgeta first appeared on a rainy day in front of the Oriental Institute in Chicago. He was struck to the ground by the vision, and after he had rolled about for a bit, he got up and told me what he had seen. He also gave me many ideas: In fact, if you do not like some part of this book, you may attribute it to him."

== Contents ==
This work follows the typical format of a devotional of a Catholic saint, using it as a framework to satirize such works. The piece first recounts the life of the saint as a martyr in the 400s, then details a religious order founded in her name in the 1200s, and subsequent miracles attributed to her. It ends with "The St. Fidgeta Devotional" prayer.

The first part recounts the life of St. Fidgeta, who is called "the patron saint of nervous and fidgety children", starting with her birth in 482 AD and ending with her martyrdom in 490 AD. She was martyred by her grammar school teacher, "the notorious pagan skeptic" Putricordes, whom she outraged by her "unremitting and unrelenting piety" until he slapped her to death.

Among the tales of miracles St. Fidgeta performed centuries after her death are the saving of the city of Pinsk from certain destruction by a Turkish army in 1450. Appearing as a fluffy pink cloud on the Pinsk walls, she "induced in the heathen army a state of uneasiness", forcing the soldiers of the Prophet to retreat.
