= The Haunting of Harrington House =

1981 made for television film

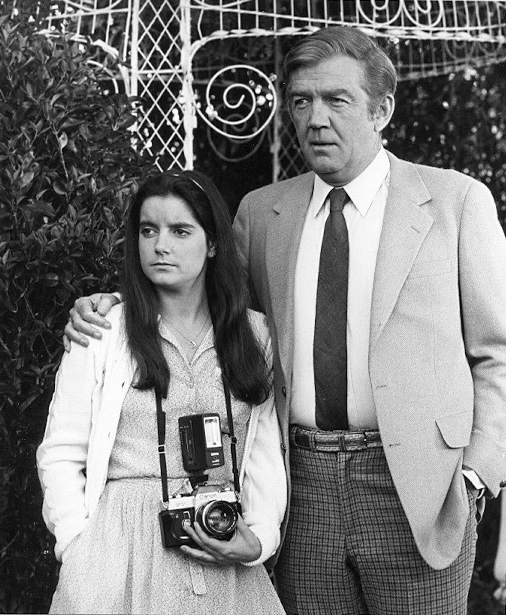
- Dominique Dunne and James T. Callahan
- Genre: Mystery
- Written by: Chris Manheim
- Directed by: Murray Golden
- Starring: Dominique Dunne; Roscoe Lee Brown; Edie Adams
- Country of origin: United States
- Original language: English

Production
- Producers: Diane Asselin; Paul Asselin
- Running time: 60 minutes

Original release
- Network: CBS
- Release: September 8, 1981

The Haunting of Harrington House is a made for TV film and the second installment of the anthology series CBS Children's Mystery Theatre, that aired on September 8, 1981. It is directed by Murray Golden. It stars Dominique Dunne and Roscoe Lee Browne.

== Plot ==
Polly Ames is a fourteen year old girl returning to her father’s hotel, Harrington House, after some time away. Upon arriving home, her father, Walter, tells her that strange events have been occurring, resulting in a loss of clientele. Due to the declining business, he may be forced to sell the hotel. Polly, who is an avid photographer, decides to investigate the mysterious events.

Polly meets a tenant, Diogenes Chase (D.C.), who offers to help her find the source of the disturbances. As a former teacher, D.C. encourages her to follow the clues and use her problem solving skills.

While investigating, Polly finds a loose clothing button next to the scene of one of the disturbances. She deduces that it may be a clue and keeps it. Later, when alone, she is approached by a mysterious figure in a black dress that demands the button be returned. Polly is overwhelmed and faints.

== Cast ==
- Dominique Dunne as Polly Ames
- Roscoe Lee Browne as Diogenes Chase
- Edie Adams as Madame Zenia
- Phil Leeds as Uncle Max
- Vito Scotti as Marco Roselli
- James T. Callahan as Walter Ames

== Production ==
The episode was filmed in a Los Angeles mansion. The mansion required several alterations, as well as lighting and camera techniques, to attain the mysterious atmosphere the director wanted.

Dominique Dunne, who plays a photographer in the film, had also worked professionally as a photographer in the past. Similarly, Vito Scotti, who plays the illusionist Roselli, had also worked as a professional illusionist.

The Haunting of Harrington House was the second of five installments of The CBS Children’s Mystery Theatre. It was preceded by The Clue According To SHERLOCK HOLMES. The intent of the series was to teach children problem solving skills, specifically, the use of deductive reasoning.
