= John Bellairs =

American fantasy novelist (1938–1991)

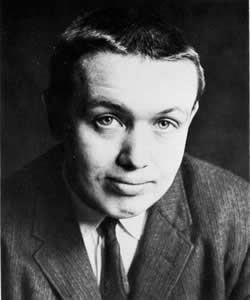
- Born: John Anthony Bellairs; January 17, 1938; Marshall, Michigan, U.S.
- Died: March 8, 1991 (aged 53); Haverhill, Massachusetts, US
- Education: University of Notre Dame (BA); University of Chicago (MA)
- Occupation: Novelist
- Writing career
- Period: 1966–1991
- Genres: Fantasy, horror, humor
- Notable work: The House with a Clock in Its Walls, The Face in the Frost

John Anthony Bellairs (January 17, 1938 – March 8, 1991) was an American author best known for his fantasy novel The Face in the Frost and many Gothic mystery novels for children featuring the characters Lewis Barnavelt, Rose Rita Pottinger, Johnny Dixon, and Anthony Monday. Most of his books were illustrated by Edward Gorey. At the time of his death, Bellairs' books had sold a quarter-million copies in hard cover and more than a million and a half copies in paperback.

== Biography ==
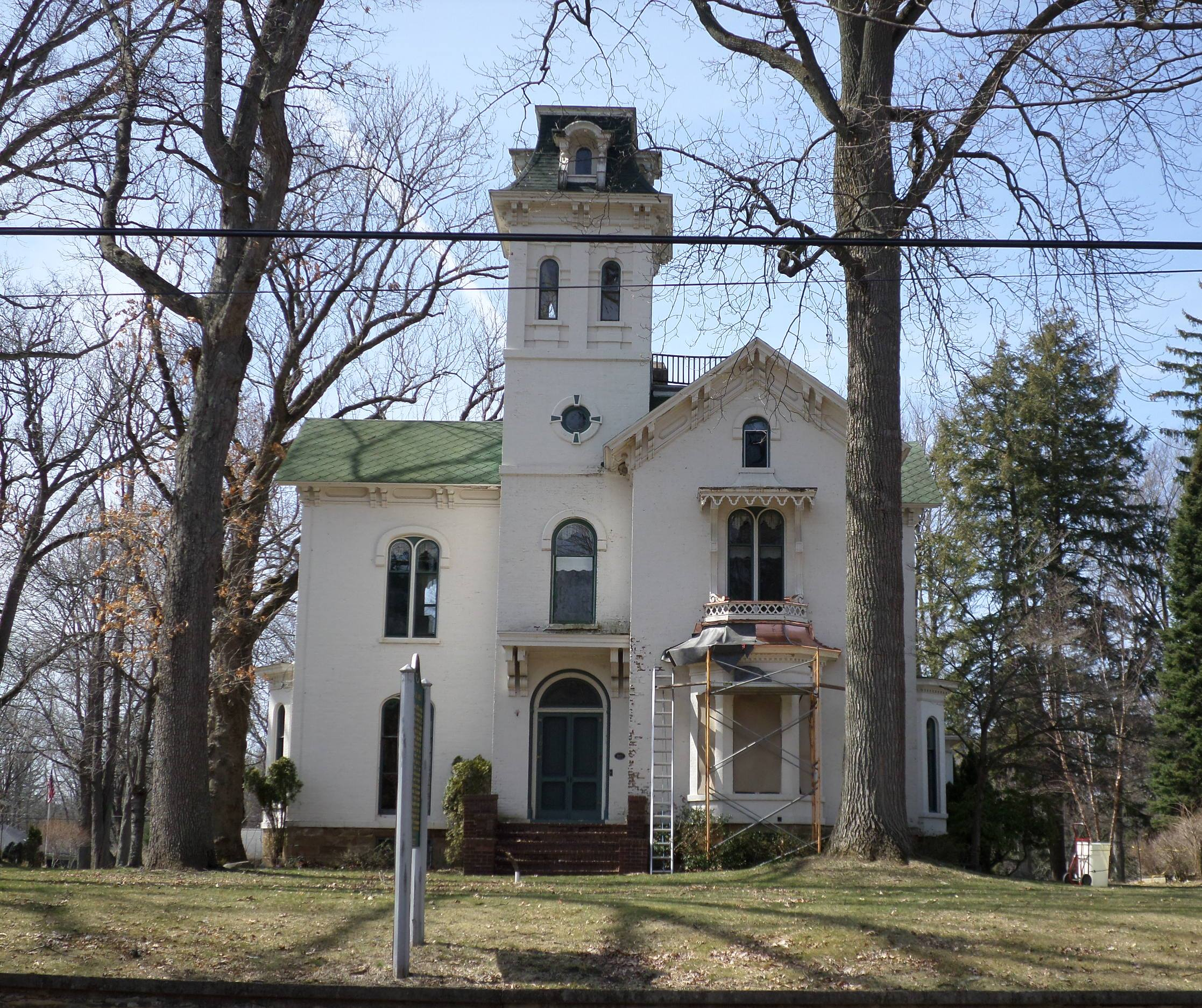
Front view of the Cronin House in Marshall, Michigan, which inspired The House with a Clock in Its Walls

=== Early life and education ===
Bellairs was born in Marshall, Michigan, the son of Virginia (Monk) and Frank Edward Bellairs, who ran a cigar store and bowling alley in Marshall. He was raised a strict Roman Catholic and initially planned to become a priest. His hometown inspired the fictional town of New Zebedee, Michigan, where he set his trilogy about Lewis Barnavelt and Rose Rita Pottinger. Shy, overweight, and often bullied as a child, he had become a voracious reader and a self-described "bottomless pit of useless information" by the time he graduated from Marshall High School and entered the University of Notre Dame in 1955.

Bellairs graduated with a Bachelor of Arts degree in English magna cum laude from the University of Notre Dame in 1959. At Notre Dame, he competed in the College Bowl and wrote a regular humor column for the student magazine Scholastic. Bellairs went on to receive a Master of Arts degree in English from the University of Chicago in 1960. He received a Woodrow Wilson Fellowship in 1959.

=== Career and interests ===
Bellairs taught English at the College of Saint Teresa (1963–65), Shimer College (1966–67), Emmanuel College (1968–69), and Merrimack College (1969–71) before turning full-time to writing in 1971. During the late 1960s, he spent six months living and writing in Bristol, United Kingdom, where he began writing The Face in the Frost. Bristol would later feature in his 1990 novel The Secret of the Underground Room.

His personal interests included archaeology, architecture, history, Latin, baseball, kitschy antiques, bad poetry, visits to the UK, and trivia of all kinds. His favorite authors included Charles Dickens, Henry James, M.R. James, Garrett Mattingly, and C. V. Wedgwood.

Alongside Christopher Tolkien, Bellairs was a guest of honor at the 18th Annual Mythopoeic Conference at Marquette University in 1987, hosted by the Mythopoeic Society.

=== Death and legacy ===
Bellairs died suddenly of cardiovascular disease at his home in Haverhill, Massachusetts, on March 8, 1991, at the age of 53. He was survived by his ex-wife, Priscilla (Braids) Bellairs, whom he had married on June 24, 1968, and their son Frank J. Bellairs. Frank Bellairs died in Cambridge, Massachusetts, on August 19, 1999, at the age of 29. Priscilla Bellairs lives in Newburyport.

In 1992, a historical marker was placed in front of the historic Cronin House in Bellairs's hometown of Marshall, Michigan. Built in 1870 for local merchant Jeremiah Cronin, this imposing Italianate mansion with its 60-foot tower had inspired the titular house of his 1973 book.

Bellairs was inducted into the Haverhill Citizens Hall of Fame in 2000.

== Writings ==
=== Books for adults ===
Bellairs' first published work, St. Fidgeta and Other Parodies (1966), is a collection of short stories satirizing the rites and rituals of Second Vatican Council-era Catholicism. The title story of St. Fidgeta grew out of humorous stories Bellairs made up and shared with friends while living in Chicago. After committing one such story to paper, he sent it to the Chicago-based Catholic magazine The Critic, which published the story in summer 1965. The following year, the hagiography of St. Fidgeta was supplemented by eleven other humorous stories, including an essay on lesser-known popes of antiquity, a cathedral constructed over the course of centuries, and a spoof letter from a modern-day Xavier Rynne about the escapades at the fictional Third Vatican Council. Library Journal hailed St. Fidgeta as "religious burlesque" that delivered "strokes of inspired foolishness." A writer for the National Catholic Reporter called it a "gem."

The Pedant and the Shuffly, his second book, is a short illustrated fable featuring the evil magician Snodrog (the titular pedant), who ensnares his victims with inescapable (and nonsensical) logic until the kindly sorcerer, Sir Bertram Crabtree-Gore, enlists the help of a magical Shuffly to defeat Snodrog. The book was originally published in 1968 and rereleased in 2001 and 2009.

Bellairs undertook his third book, The Face in the Frost (1969), while living in Britain and after reading J.R.R. Tolkien's The Lord of the Rings. Bellairs said of his third book:

"The Face in the Frost was an attempt to write in the Tolkien manner. I was much taken by The Lord of the Rings and wanted to do a modest work on those lines. In reading the latter book I was struck by the fact that Gandalf was not much of a person—just a good guy. So I gave Prospero, my wizard, most of my phobias and crotchets. It was simply meant as entertainment and any profundity will have to be read in."

Writing in 1973, Lin Carter described The Face in the Frost as one of the three best fantasy novels to appear since The Lord of the Rings. Carter stated that Bellairs was planning a sequel to The Face in the Frost at the time. An unfinished sequel titled The Dolphin Cross was included in the anthology Magic Mirrors (New England Science Fiction Association Press, 2009).

=== Books for children ===
Bellairs's next novel was originally written as a contemporary adult fantasy. To improve the novel's marketability, his publisher suggested rewriting it as a young readers' book. The result was The House with a Clock in Its Walls (1973), which was named as one of The New York Times Outstanding Books of 1973 and nominated for other awards.

Following the success of The House with a Clock in Its Walls, Bellairs focused on writing Gothic fantasy adventures aimed at elementary and middle-school children. "I write scary thrillers for kids because I have the imagination of a 10-year-old," remarked Bellairs. "I love haunted houses, ghosts, witches, mummies, incantations, secret rituals performed by the light of the waning moon, coffins, bones, cemeteries and enchanted objects." Bellairs also wrote his hometown influenced his creative bent: “In my imagination I repeatedly walk up and down the streets of the beautiful old Michigan town where I grew up. It’s full of old Victorian mansions and history, and it would work on the creative mind of any kid.”

Writing for The New York Times, Marilyn Stasio characterized Bellairs' children's books as fast-paced, spooky adventures involving "believable and likeable" characters, generally a child and an older person (usually a "lovable eccentric") who are friends and must go on adventures and solve a mystery involving supernatural elements such as ghosts and wicked sorcerers. Beyond these supernatural elements, Bellairs's novels evoked "a child's concern with comfort and security in his real world," addressing childhood fears of abandonment, loneliness, and bullying, as well as coming of age. His stories are described as spooky but ultimately reassuring as the characters conquer evil through friendship.

The books have proved especially popular among middle-grade readers between the ages of 9 and 13 but also have significant young adult and adult readerships.

=== Posthumous sequels ===
On his death in 1991, Bellairs left behind two unfinished manuscripts and two one-page synopses for future adventures. The Bellairs estate commissioned Brad Strickland to complete the two unfinished manuscripts and to write novels based on the two one-page outlines. These became The Ghost in the Mirror; The Vengeance of the Witch-finder; The Drum, the Doll, and the Zombie; and The Doom of the Haunted Opera, respectively. Starting in 1996 with The Hand of the Necromancer, Strickland began writing his own stories based on the established characters.

Strickland announced in spring 2005 that new adventures of the Bellairs' characters were under way, following contract negotiations with the Bellairs' estate and a two-year absence since his last-published novel. The first of these new adventures was The House Where Nobody Lived, which was published on October 5, 2006. All told, thirteen sequels to Bellairs' books have been written by Strickland.

=== Critical analysis ===
Critical attention has focused on The House With the Clock in Its Walls as exemplar of Bellairs' literary merit and style. Critics have argued that Bellairs wrestled with notions of masculinity, femininity, and queerness in his works. Professor Gary D. Schmidt contended that Bellairs' Lewis Barnavelt and Rose Rita Pottinger trilogy traced the "emerging acceptance of self" by the two main characters, who struggled with internalized gender norms. Elizabeth Wein analyzes Bellairs's use of the haunted house motif in The House With a Clock in Its Walls. One of the most substantial academic treatments of Bellairs comes from Dawn Heinecken, professor of women's and gender studies at the University of Louisville. Heinecken situates Bellairs in 1970s-era anxieties about gender and changing discourses around masculinity, which were reflected in the era's children's literature.

Conservative critic William Kilpatrick observed of Bellairs that "While his books are quite frightening, they are well written and undergirded by a moral vision" and recommended them to parents who wish to expose their children to age-appropriate literature that both entertains and edifies. English education instructor Randi Dickson suggested that Bellairs' oeuvre evidenced greater literary merit than the works of R. L. Stine, whose horror fiction appeals to a youthful demographic similar to Bellairs's. Educators have used The House With the Clock in Its Walls as a case study for using storytelling techniques to draw in reluctant readers and assigned The Curse of the Blue Figurine to students in a book club.

Bellairs' books have been translated into Czech, French, German, Japanese, Polish, and Spanish, among other languages.

== Illustrators ==
Edward Gorey provided cover illustrations and frontispieces for all but three of Bellairs's 15 children's novels and continued to illustrate the Strickland novels until Gorey's death in 2000. The novel The Beast Under the Wizard's Bridge featured Gorey's last published artwork before his death. Despite the strong association of the novels with Gorey's illustrations, Bellairs and Gorey never met and probably never even corresponded. The Gorey covers are no longer in print, though some newer editions of the novels still contain interior Gorey illustrations.

S. D. Schindler and Bart Goldman have created cover art for the Strickland books published since 2001.

Marilyn Fitschen provided the covers and illustrations for Bellairs' first three books: St Fidgeta and Other Parodies, The Pedant and the Shuffly, and The Face in the Frost.

== Awards ==
| # | Book Title | Award | Year |
|---|---|---|---|
| 01 | The House with a Clock in Its Walls | American Library Association Children's Books of International Interest Award | 1973 |
| 02 | The House with a Clock in Its Walls | New York Times Outstanding Books of 1973 Award | 1973 |
| 03 | The House with a Clock in Its Walls | South Carolina Children's Book Award Nominee | 1978–1979 |
| 04 | The House with a Clock in Its Walls | Michigan Young Readers Award Nominee | 1980 |
| 05 | The House with a Clock in Its Walls | Maude Hart Lovelace Award Nominee (Minnesota) | 1982 |
| 06 | The Letter, the Witch, and the Ring | South Carolina Children's Book Award Nominee | 1979–1980 |
| 07 | The Letter, the Witch, and the Ring | Utah Children's Fiction Book Award | 1981 |
| 08 | The Treasure of Alpheus Winterborn | Maud Hart Lovelace Award Nominee (Minnesota) | 1983 |
| 09 | The Curse of the Blue Figurine | Utah Children's Fiction Book Award Nominee | 1985 |
| 10 | The Curse of the Blue Figurine | Indian Paintbrush Book Award Nominee (Wyoming) | 1986 |
| 11 | The Curse of the Blue Figurine | Virginia Young Readers Award, Middle School Division | 1986–1987 |
| 12 | The Curse of the Blue Figurine | Read-Aloud Books Too Good to Miss List (Indiana Library Federation) | 1990–1991 |
| 13 | The Mummy, the Will, and the Crypt | Iowa Teen Award Nominee | 1985–1986 |
| 14 | The Dark Secret of Weatherend | Utah Children's Fiction Book Award Nominee | 1987 |
| 15 | The Eyes of the Killer Robot | Rebecca Caudill Young Readers Book Award Nominee (Illinois) | 1991 |
| 16 | The Lamp from the Warlock's Tomb | Edgar Allan Poe Award, Best Juvenile Division, Nominee | 1989 |
| 17 | The Specter from the Magician's Museum | Georgia Author of the Year Award, Young Adult Division | 1998 |
| 18 | The Specter from the Magician's Museum | New York Public Library "Best Books for the Teen Age" Awards | |

== Published books ==
=== Novels ===
| # | Title | Month | Year | Series | Chapters | Pages | Writer | Illustrator |
|---|---|---|---|---|---|---|---|---|
| 01 | St. Fidgeta and Other Parodies | Jun | 1966 | | 12 | 123 | John Bellairs | Marilyn Fitschen |
| 02 | The Pedant and the Shuffly | Feb | 1968 | | NA | 79 | John Bellairs | Marilyn Fitschen |
| 03 | The Face in the Frost | | 1969 | | 11 | 174 | John Bellairs | Marilyn Fitschen |
| 04 | The House with a Clock in Its Walls | Jan | 1973 | Lewis Barnavelt | 11 | 179 | John Bellairs | Edward Gorey |
| 05 | The Figure in the Shadows | | 1975 | Lewis Barnavelt | 13 | 155 | John Bellairs | Mercer Mayer |
| 06 | The Letter, the Witch, and the Ring | Jan | 1976 | Lewis Barnavelt | 13 | 188 | John Bellairs | Richard Egielski |
| 07 | The Treasure of Alpheus Winterborn | May | 1978 | Anthony Monday | 17 | 180 | John Bellairs | Judith Gwyn Brown |
| 08 | The Curse of the Blue Figurine | May | 1983 | Johnny Dixon | 12 | 200 | John Bellairs | Edward Gorey |
| 09 | The Mummy, the Will, and the Crypt | Nov | 1983 | Johnny Dixon | 16 | 168 | John Bellairs | Edward Gorey |
| 10 | The Dark Secret of Weatherend | Jul | 1984 | Anthony Monday | 15 | 182 | John Bellairs | Edward Gorey |
| 11 | The Spell of the Sorcerer's Skull | Nov | 1984 | Johnny Dixon | 11 | 170 | John Bellairs | Edward Gorey |
| 12 | The Revenge of the Wizard's Ghost | Nov | 1985 | Johnny Dixon | 15 | 147 | John Bellairs | Edward Gorey |
| 13 | The Eyes of the Killer Robot | Oct | 1986 | Johnny Dixon | 17 | 167 | John Bellairs | Edward Gorey |
| 14 | The Lamp from the Warlock's Tomb | May | 1988 | Anthony Monday | 14 | 168 | John Bellairs | Edward Gorey |
| 15 | The Trolley to Yesterday | Jul | 1989 | Johnny Dixon | 18 | 183 | John Bellairs | Edward Gorey |
| 16 | The Chessmen of Doom | Nov | 1989 | Johnny Dixon | 16 | 155 | John Bellairs | Edward Gorey |
| 17 | The Secret of the Underground Room | Mar | 1990 | Johnny Dixon | 13 | 127 | John Bellairs | Edward Gorey |
| 18 | The Mansion in the Mist | Aug | 1992 | Anthony Monday | 17 | 170 | John Bellairs | Edward Gorey |
| 19 | The Ghost in the Mirror | Apr | 1993 | Lewis Barnavelt | 13 | 169 | coauthors† | Edward Gorey |
| 20 | The Vengeance of the Witch-finder | Sep | 1993 | Lewis Barnavelt | 15 | 153 | coauthors† | Edward Gorey |
| 21 | The Drum, the Doll, and the Zombie | Sep | 1994 | Johnny Dixon | 15 | 153 | coauthors† | Edward Gorey |
| 22 | The Doom of the Haunted Opera | Sep | 1995 | Lewis Barnavelt | 16 | 153 | coauthors† | Edward Gorey |
| 23 | The Hand of the Necromancer | Sep | 1996 | Johnny Dixon | 18 | 168 | Brad Strickland | Edward Gorey |
| 24 | The Bell, the Book, and the Spellbinder | Oct | 1997 | Johnny Dixon | 16 | 149 | Brad Strickland | Edward Gorey |
| 25 | The Specter from the Magician's Museum | Mar | 1998 | Lewis Barnavelt | 16 | 149 | Brad Strickland | Edward Gorey |
| 26 | The Wrath of the Grinning Ghost | Sep | 1999 | Johnny Dixon | 15 | 166 | Brad Strickland | Edward Gorey |
| 27 | The Beast Under the Wizard's Bridge | Sep | 2000 | Lewis Barnavelt | 15 | 151 | Brad Strickland | Edward Gorey |
| 28 | The Tower at the End of the World | Sep | 2001 | Lewis Barnavelt | 15 | 146 | Brad Strickland | S. D. Schindler |
| 29 | The Whistle, the Grave, and the Ghost | Aug | 2003 | Lewis Barnavelt | 14 | 152 | Brad Strickland | S. D. Schindler |
| 30 | The House Where Nobody Lived | Oct | 2006 | Lewis Barnavelt | 18 | 173 | Brad Strickland | Bart Goldman |
| 31 | The Sign of the Sinister Sorcerer | Oct | 2008 | Lewis Barnavelt | 13 | 168 | Brad Strickland | Bart Goldman |
| 32 | The Stone, the Cipher, and the Shadows | Aug | 2023 | Johnny Dixon | 17 | 167 | Brad Strickland | Open Road Media |

† Some Lewis Barnavelt and Johnny Dixon books were outlined by Bellairs and completed by Strickland, who subsequently created new stories in both series.

=== Publishers ===
| # | Title | Amber | Artist House | Bantam Skylark/BDD | Barnes & Noble | Corgi | Dell Yearling/BDD | Dial/Penguin | Editions du Rocher | Editora Record | Gallimard Jeunesse | Harcourt Brace Jovanovich | Heyne | Macmillan | Mythopoeic Press | NESFA Press | Puffin/Penguin | Shueisha Publishing |
|---|---|---|---|---|---|---|---|---|---|---|---|---|---|---|---|---|---|---|
| 01 | St. Fidgeta and Other Parodies | | | | | | | | | | | | | ✓ | | | | |
| 02 | The Pedant and the Shuffly | | | | | | | | | | | | | ✓ | ✓ | | | |
| 03 | The Face in the Frost | | | | | | | | | | | | | ✓ | | | | |
| 04 | The House with a Clock in Its Walls | ✓ | ✓ | | | | ✓ | ✓ | ✓ | ✓ | ✓ | | ✓ | | | | ✓ | |
| 05 | The Figure in the Shadows | ✓ | ✓ | | | | ✓ | ✓ | ✓ | ✓ | ✓ | | ✓ | | | | ✓ | |
| 06 | The Letter, the Witch, and the Ring | ✓ | ✓ | | | | ✓ | ✓ | ✓ | ✓ | ✓ | | ✓ | | | | ✓ | |
| 07 | The Treasure of Alpheus Winterborn | | | ✓ | | | | | | | | ✓ | | | | | | |
| 08 | The Curse of the Blue Figurine | ✓ | | ✓ | | ✓ | | ✓ | ✓ | | | | | | | | ✓ | |
| 09 | The Mummy, the Will, and the Crypt | ✓ | | ✓ | | ✓ | | ✓ | ✓ | | | | | | | | ✓ | ✓ |
| 10 | The Dark Secret of Weatherend | | | ✓ | | | | ✓ | | | | | | | | | ✓ | |
| 11 | The Spell of the Sorcerer's Skull | ✓ | | ✓ | | ✓ | | ✓ | ✓ | | | | | | | | ✓ | ✓ |
| 12 | The Revenge of the Wizard's Ghost | | | ✓ | | | | ✓ | ✓ | | | | | | | | ✓ | ✓ |
| 13 | The Eyes of the Killer Robot | | | ✓ | | | | ✓ | ✓ | | | | | | | | ✓ | |
| 14 | The Lamp from the Warlock's Tomb | | | ✓ | | | | ✓ | | | | | | | | | ✓ | |
| 15 | The Trolley to Yesterday | | | ✓ | | | | ✓ | ✓ | | | | | | | | ✓ | |
| 16 | The Chessmen of Doom | | | ✓ | | | | ✓ | | | | | | | | | ✓ | |
| 17 | The Secret of the Underground Room | | | | | | | ✓ | ✓ | | | | | | | | ✓ | |
| 18 | The Mansion in the Mist | | | | | | | ✓ | | | | | | | | | ✓ | |
| 19 | The Ghost in the Mirror | ✓ | ✓ | | | | | ✓ | ✓ | | | | ✓ | | | | ✓ | |
| 20 | The Vengeance of the Witch-finder | ✓ | ✓ | | | | | ✓ | ✓ | | | | ✓ | | | | ✓ | |
| 21 | The Drum, the Doll, and the Zombie | | | | | | | ✓ | ✓ | | | | | | | | ✓ | |
| 22 | The Doom of the Haunted Opera | ✓ | ✓ | | | | | ✓ | ✓ | | | | ✓ | | | | ✓ | |
| 23 | The Hand of the Necromancer | | | | | | | ✓ | | | | | | | | | ✓ | |
| 24 | The Bell, the Book, and the Spellbinder | | | | | | | ✓ | | | | | | | | | ✓ | |
| 25 | The Specter from the Magician's Museum | ✓ | ✓ | | | | | ✓ | ✓ | | | | ✓ | | | | ✓ | |
| 26 | The Wrath of the Grinning Ghost | | | | | | | ✓ | | | | | | | | | ✓ | |
| 27 | The Beast Under the Wizard's Bridge | ✓ | ✓ | | | | | ✓ | ✓ | | | | ✓ | | | | ✓ | |
| 28 | The Tower at the End of the World | | | | | | | ✓ | ✓ | | | | | | | | ✓ | |
| 29 | The Whistle, the Grave, and the Ghost | | | | | | | ✓ | | | | | | | | | | |
| 30 | The House Where Nobody Lived | | | | | | | ✓ | | | | | | | | | | |
| 31 | The Sign of the Sinister Sorcerer | | | | | | | ✓ | | | | | | | | | | |
| 32 | Magic Mirrors | | | | | | | | | | | | | | | ✓ | | |
| 33 | The Best of John Bellairs | | | | ✓ | | | | | | | | | | | | | |
| 34 | The Best of John Bellairs 2 | | | | ✓ | | | | | | | | | | | | | |

== Adaptations ==
=== Films ===
On November 18, 2011, Mythology Entertainment, founded by Brad Fischer, co-president of production at Phoenix Pictures; Laeta Kalogridis; and James Vanderbilt announced that they hired Eric Kripke, creator of Supernatural and Revolution, to write and produce a feature film based on John Bellairs' work through a partnership with John's estate. "Jamie, Laeta and I are thrilled to launch Mythology Entertainment and to be partnering with Eric Kripke and the estate of John Bellairs for our first feature project,” Fischer said.

“As a kid, Eric was inspired by Bellairs’ work and these books have stayed with him through the years…. As a company, we aspire to be a haven for artists and friends who believe in the power of myth and remember that feeling we all got as kids, when the lights went down and the images came up and anything was possible.”

The film adaptation of Bellairs' novel The House with a Clock in Its Walls stars Jack Black as Uncle Jonathan, Cate Blanchett as Mrs. Zimmerman, and Owen Vaccaro as Lewis Barnavelt, and was directed by Eli Roth. It was released on September 21, 2018.

=== Audiobooks ===
| # | Title | Year | Publisher | Narrator |
|---|---|---|---|---|
| 01 | The Face in the Frost | 1995 | Recorded Books | George Guidall |
| 02 | The Ghost in the Mirror | 1995 | Recorded Books | George Guidall |
| 03 | The House with a Clock in Its Walls | 1995 | Recorded Books | George Guidall |
| 04 | The Lamp from the Warlock's Tomb | 1995 | Recorded Books | Betty Low |
| 05 | The Mansion in the Mist | 1995 | Recorded Books | Betty Low |

As of September 2022, Blackstone Publishing has re-issued Face In the Frost and all 12 Lewis Barnavelt books on CD and digital formats. Beginning in May 2022 and continuing until mid-2023, Blackstone commissioned audiobooks of the Johnny Dixon books, read by Johnny Heller.

=== Television ===
| # | TV program title | Book title | Producer | Year |
|---|---|---|---|---|
| 01 | Once Upon a Midnight Scary | The House with a Clock in Its Walls | VideoGems | 1979 |
| 02 | The Clue According to Sherlock Holmes | The Treasure of Alpheus Winterborn | VideoGems | 1980 |
| 03 | The House with a Clock in Its Walls | The House with a Clock in Its Walls | Barr Films | 1991 |
| 04 | The Treasure of Alpheus Winterborn | The Treasure of Alpheus Winterborn | Barr Films | 1991 |

== See also ==
- Lewis Barnavelt (series)
- Johnny Dixon (series)
- Anthony Monday (series)
- List of horror fiction authors
