= Owen Vaccaro =

American actor

- Born: Owen Wilder Vaccaro; 2005 or 2006 (age 20–21)
- Occupation: Actor
- Years active: 2013–present

Owen Wilder Vaccaro (born 2005/2006) is an American actor. He has appeared in feature films since 2015, including Daddy's Home (2015), Daddy's Home 2 (2017), and in the role of Lewis in The House with a Clock in Its Walls (2018).

== Life and work ==
Vaccaro was born in 2005/2006. He has an older sister and a younger brother. He lives in Atlanta, Georgia. In first grade, he acted in a play and became interested in acting further. An agent helped him get roles on the independent films The Product of Me and Rom, which led to his role in the 2015 feature film Daddy's Home. He attended Holy Innocents' Episcopal School in Atlanta.

He co-starred in the Paramount Pictures films Daddy's Home (2015) and Daddy's Home 2 (2017). The Hartford Courant noted of his appearance in Daddy's Home that "it has to be said that the child actors playing the kids, Megan (Scarlett Estevez) and Dylan (Owen Vaccaro) actually give real comic performances". In 2018, Deadline Hollywood reported that Vaccaro was "poised to breakout [sic]" for playing the role of Lewis Barnavelt in the Universal Pictures film The House with a Clock in Its Walls, alongside Jack Black and Cate Blanchett.

== Filmography ==
| Year | Title | Role | Notes |
|---|---|---|---|
| 2013 | Rom | Jason | |
| 2014 | A Product of Me | Young Levi | |
| 2015 | Daddy's Home | Dylan Mayron | |
| 2016 | Mother's Day | Charlie | |
| 2017 | Miyubi | Dennis | Short film |
| 2017 | Fun Mom Dinner | Lucas | |
| 2017 | Daddy's Home 2 | Dylan Mayron | |
| 2018 | The House with a Clock in Its Walls | Lewis Barnavelt | |
| 2019 | Mine 9 | Russell | |
| 2019 | Team Marco | Marco | |
| 2019 | Noelle | Young Nick Kringle | |
| 2021 | Finding ʻOhana | Casper | |
| 2024 | Silver Fox | Rocco | Short film |

== Nominations ==
| Year | Award | Category | Work | Result | Ref. |
|---|---|---|---|---|---|
| 2016 | Young Entertainer Award | Best Supporting Young Actor - Feature Film | Daddy's Home | Nominated | |
