= Brad Strickland =

American novelist

William Bradley Strickland (born October 27, 1947) is an American writer known primarily for fantasy and science fiction. His speculative fiction is published under the name Brad Strickland except for one novel written as Will Bradley. By a wide margin his work most widely held in WorldCat participating libraries is The Sign of the Sinister Sorcerer (Dial Books, 2008), which concluded the Lewis Barnavelt series created by John Bellairs (1938–1991).

== Life ==
Strickland was born in New Holland, Georgia. His first publication in the speculative fiction genre was "Payment Deferred", as by Bradley Strickland in the May 1982 issue of Asimov's Science Fiction. His first novel, To Stand Beneath the Sun, was published in 1985. Since, he has written or co-written sixty-plus novels and more than a hundred short stories. His 1992 published as by Will Bradley, Ark Liberty, "treats the ecocatastrophic ... near-death of Earth with melodramatic panache, pitting its scientist hero against suicidal governments and embedding him – after his physical death – into the eponymous undersea biome as its Computer mentor and spirit, while centuries pass."

From 1992, Strickland completed four Lewis Barnavelt and Johnny Dixon novels that were at least outlined by John Bellairs; he followed with nine more, bringing both series to twelve volumes. Beginning in 1996 he has created his own stories using the already-established characters. He is also credited for writing novels for the Wishbone series.

His 2000 book, When Mack Came Back, won Strickland the 2001 Georgia Author of the Year Award, Children's/Young Adult Division honor. In 2002, Strickland and Thomas E. Fuller began the Pirate Hunter series and, later, the Mars Year One series. Mr. Fuller died before all the books were published.

Strickland was a professor of English at Gainesville State College, which at the time of his retirement had become part of The University of North Georgia in Oakwood, Georgia. He is an active member of the Atlanta Radio Theatre Company, writing, adapting and acting in numerous audio drama projects.

== Reception of works ==
Strickland's books have generally been received favorably. For John Bellairs's Johnny Dixon in the Hand of the Necromancer (1996), Kirkus Reviews wrote "Strickland, in his first solo work featuring the characters created by John Bellairs, leads readers on an entertaining frolic. There are enough well-placed frissons to keep readers flipping those pages, even those who know that, in keeping with series formula, all nefarious plans will be nixed."

For When Mack Came Back (2000), Kirkus Reviews called it a "heart-tugging period piece" and "Rather than an action adventure, this is a quiet story of a boy who learns to accept himself and of a man who learns to value the steadfast loyalty of a dog."

A review of The Tower At The End Of The World (2001) for Kirkus Reviews read that, "In comparison to the original [books by John Bellairs], this addition to the series [...] falls short." and "For fans of Bellairs hungry for another dose of his spellbinding mystery, this will serve to deaden the thirst, but not quench it."

Concerning Grimoire The Curse of the Midions (2006), Kirkus Reviews wrote "Strickland offers a conventional but typically fast-paced tale, with nicely lurid touches and plenty of unanswered questions. Good start."

For Grimoire Tracked By Terror (2007), Kirkus Reviews wrote "Strickland crafts a polished, suspenseful tale, developing a scenario well-stocked with nightmares and traps while building to a battle in which Jarvey becomes a little better at controlling his own magical abilities. A serviceable continuation to a still-promising series."

For Flight of the Outcast (2010), a Kirkus Reviews reviewer wrote that, "Good character development and plenty of momentum make this an enjoyable read, but there is clearly a lot more story ahead—this installment ends not with a cliffhanger but an anticipation of action yet to come."
