= The House with a Clock in Its Walls =

1973 juvenile mystery novel by John Bellairs

- First edition
- Author: John Bellairs
- Illustrator: Edward Gorey
- Language: English
- Series: Lewis Barnavelt
- Genre: Fantasy, mystery fiction
- Published: 1973
- Publisher: Puffin Books
- Publication place: United States
- Media type: Print book
- Pages: 179
- ISBN: 978-0-451-48128-3
- OCLC: 1048899765
- Followed by: The Figure in the Shadows

The House with a Clock in Its Walls is a 1973 juvenile mystery fiction novel written by American author John Bellairs and illustrated by Edward Gorey. It is the first of the Lewis Barnavelt novel series. A 2018 film adaptation was released by Universal Pictures and directed by Eli Roth.

== Plot ==
Lewis Barnavelt, recently an orphan, moves to the town of New Zebedee, Michigan, to live with his mysterious uncle Jonathan Barnavelt. Lewis' uncle turns out to be a mediocre, though well-intentioned, warlock. His next-door neighbor and good friend, Florence Zimmermann, is a far more powerful good witch. Jonathan's house was previously owned by Isaac Izard and his wife Selena, a sinister couple who became corrupted by their practice of black magic and plotted to bring about the end of the world. Before dying, Isaac constructed the eponymous clock that he hid somewhere inside the walls of the house, where it eternally ticks as it attempts to pull the world into a magical alignment, which would destroy the world.

Lewis befriends a local boy named Tarby Corrigan, who is everything he is not — popular, athletic, and thin — but the two soon begin to drift apart. Lewis tries to win Tarby back by demonstrating how to raise the dead in the local cemetery on Halloween but in doing so unwittingly releases Selena Izard from her tomb.

An escalating series of encounters with the sorceress' ghost builds to a final confrontation in the basement of Jonathan's house, where Lewis must summon up his courage and prevent the couple from finishing their work and bringing about the end of the world.

== Cronin House ==
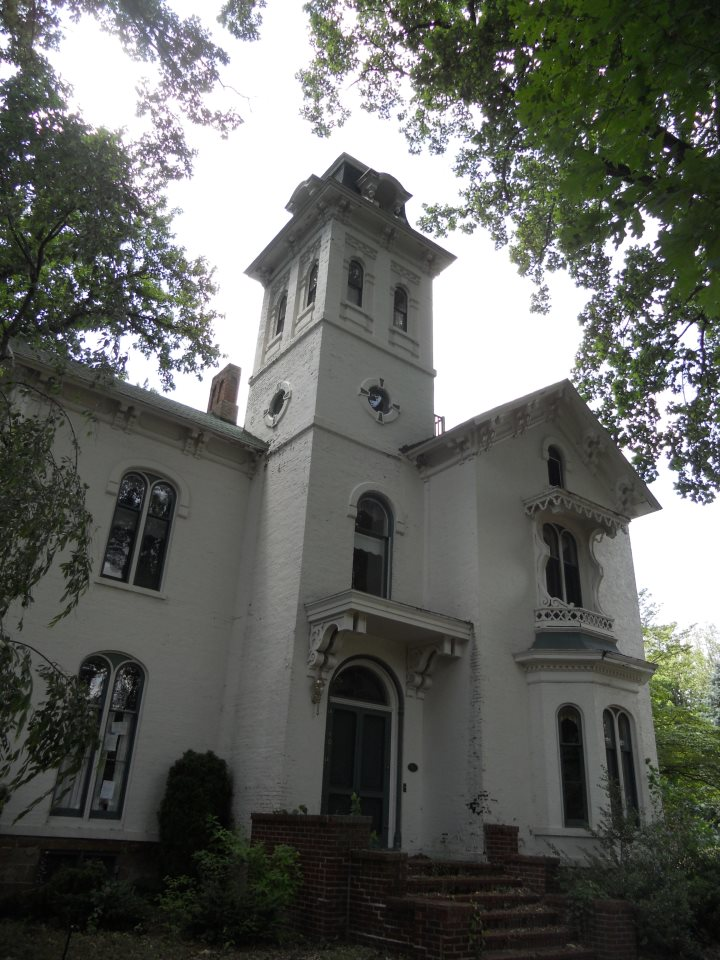
Cronin House in Marshall, Michigan that inspired the book's setting

The Cronin House in John Bellairs's hometown of Marshall, Michigan was the inspiration for his book. The house received a historical plaque in 1992. With the film adaptation debuting in 2018, Marshall's population embraced the fame with walking tours and other activities related to the book and its film.

== Reception ==
The House with a Clock in Its Walls received a New York Times outstanding book citation and a Michigan Young Readers award nomination. Anita Silvey wrote in Children's Books and Their Creators that Bellairs "established himself as one of the most compelling mystery writers for children" with The House with a Clock in Its Walls.

Kirkus Reviews wrote that Gorey's drawings of the house were "creepy-cozy", and that "Bellairs doesn't bother to supply either motivation or blueprints for the [...] scheme, but if the cavalier and capricious handling of the occult by characters and author alike precludes any bone-deep shudders, the house lives up to its promise of a few gratifying Halloween shivers". The New York Times wrote: "It's the aura of this story—its blend of the everyday and the supernatural—that makes it glow among a plethora of lacklustre occult books this spring" of 1973. It continued: "What the author has done that's so special is to touch both the intellect and the feelings. He has dusted off the paraphernalia of ancient magic and made us newly aware of the difference between good and evil. His dialogue goes snap, crackle and pop. He sets chilling scenes with suspense that tightens like a screw".

== Adaptations ==
- The book was used as the basis for one of the three segments in the 1979 television anthology Once Upon a Midnight Scary, hosted by Vincent Price.
- The book was adapted into the 2018 film of the same name.

== See also ==
- Bibliography of Halloween
