= Godfred Bysheim =

Norwegian footballer (1910-1991)

Personal information
- Date of birth: 20 February 1910
- Place of birth: Bergen, Norway
- Date of death: 19 March 1991 (aged 81)
- Position: Midfielder

International career
Years	Team	Apps	(Gls)
1936	Norway	1	(0)

Godfred Bysheim (20 February 1910 – 19 March 1991) was a Norwegian footballer. He played in one match for the Norway national football team in 1936.
