= Edward Gedge =

British modern pentathlete

Edward Gordon Gedge
Personal information
- Born: 3 May 1895 Gosport, Hampshire, England
- Died: 17 March 1991 (aged 95) New Zealand

Sport
- Sport: Modern pentathlon

Lieutenant Edward Gordon Gedge MC (3 May 1895 – 17 March 1991) was a British modern pentathlete. He competed at the 1920 Summer Olympics.

During the First World War, he served with the Royal Field Artillery. He was awarded the Military Cross in the 1918 Birthday Honours, "for distinguished service in connection with Military Operations in Salonika."
