= The House with a Clock in Its Walls (film) =

2018 American film by Eli Roth

- Theatrical release poster
- Directed by: Eli Roth
- Screenplay by: Eric Kripke
- Based on: The House with a Clock in Its Walls by John Bellairs
- Produced by: Bradley J. Fischer; James Vanderbilt; Eric Kripke
- Starring: Jack Black; Cate Blanchett; Owen Vaccaro; Renée Elise Goldsberry; Sunny Suljic; Kyle MacLachlan
- Cinematography: Rogier Stoffers
- Edited by: Fred Raskin
- Music by: Nathan Barr
- Production companies: Amblin Entertainment; Reliance Entertainment; Mythology Entertainment
- Distributed by: Universal Pictures
- Release date: September 21, 2018 (United States)
- Running time: 105 minutes
- Country: United States
- Language: English
- Budget: $42 million
- Box office: $131.5 million

The House with a Clock in Its Walls is a 2018 American dark fantasy comedy film directed by Eli Roth, based on the 1973 book by John Bellairs. Starring Jack Black, Cate Blanchett, and Owen Vaccaro, the film follows a young boy, Lewis, who is sent to live with his uncle, Jonathan, in a creaky, old house which he soon learns was previously inhabited by a villainous warlock. Universal Pictures released the film in the United States on September 21, 2018 and Walt Disney Studios Motion Pictures released the film internationally.

It was a box office success, grossing over $131 million worldwide and received mixed-to-positive reviews from critics who largely praised the cast, but said the film did not fully live up to its potential.

== Plot ==
In 1955, after his parents are killed in a car crash, ten-year-old Lewis Barnavelt moves to live with his uncle Jonathan in New Zebedee, Michigan. All he has left of his parents is a Magic 8 Ball they had given him and a family photograph. Upon entering his new home, he meets Jonathan's neighbour and best friend, Florence Zimmerman.

During the night, Lewis is puzzled when he hears a ticking sound in the walls. He explores the house and stumbles upon Jonathan smashing a wall with an ax. Frightened, Lewis runs away and encounters multiple household objects coming to life. Jonathan confesses that he is a warlock and Florence is a witch.

The house's previous owners were sinister warlock Isaac Izard, an orphaned former friend of Jonathan's who was traumatized while fighting in World War II, and his equally wicked wife, Selena. They had apparently hidden a clock within the walls of the house before they died, and Jonathan has been trying to find it and discover its purpose. Despite Jonathan's cautions, Lewis begins teaching himself magic.

On his first day at his new school, Lewis meets Tarby Corrigan, who is nice to him during physical education class and asks Lewis to help him campaign for class president. When Tarby wins the election, however, he abandons Lewis. A classmate, Rose Rita Pottinger, explains that Tarby did not actually like him and was just exploiting him to win the election, but Lewis dismisses this. Additionally, Lewis's mother visits him in his dreams. When he laments that Tarby does not see him as a friend, she suggests that he use a spell from a forbidden book to impress him. On Halloween night in a cemetery, Lewis performs a necromancy spell with Tarby and accidentally summons the corpse of Isaac from his grave.

Lewis spots Isaac in the window of the house of neighbour Mrs. Hanchett. He "rescues" her from Isaac and brings her across the street to Jonathan's house, but before he can find Jonathan, Isaac confronts them. He reveals that Mrs. Hanchett is really Selena, who killed Mrs. Hanchett, took her place, and used her bones to make the clock's key. Selena also took the form of Lewis's mother to persuade him to summon Isaac.

Isaac explains that his hidden clock's blueprints came from the demon Azazel, who had given them to him as he sought relief from the visions of horror he had witnessed during the war. The true purpose of the clock is to "reverse" human history to the beginning, rendering humanity extinct and enabling a new world to be created in Isaac's twisted image. Jonathan, Florence and Lewis are magically expelled from the house as the evil couple initiate their ritual.

Using the Magic 8 Ball to learn the location of the clock underneath the boiler room, the three return. Florence stays behind to defeat a snake guarding the room while the others pursue Isaac. The clock's power transforms Jonathan into a baby when he attempts to disarm it, except for his face, which he had shielded with enchanted cards.

Lewis consults the Magic 8 Ball, which says "Say goodbye". He realizes that he has to let go of the pain of losing his parents to harness his true power. He breaks the clock by dropping the ball, which blocks the clock's gears. Lewis harnesses the clock's magic, undoing the ritual and unleashing it on Isaac and Selena. They fall, de-age, and disintegrate, and Jonathan is returned to normal.

Lewis returns to school with more confidence and gets back at Tarby and his friends by magically bouncing a basketball off their faces and into the basket, impressing his other classmates. He then befriends Rose Rita, who appears to have a crush on him. At the end of the day, Jonathan and Florence pick up Lewis, the three of them living as a regular family.

== Cast ==
- Jack Black as Jonathan Barnavelt, Lewis' warlock uncle
- Cate Blanchett as Florence Zimmerman, Jonathan's witch best friend/neighbor
- Owen Vaccaro as Lewis Barnavelt, Jonathan's 10-year-old orphaned nephew
- Renée Elise Goldsberry as Selena Izard, a villainous witch
- Sunny Suljic as Tarby Corrigan, Lewis' classmate
- Colleen Camp as Mrs. Hanchett, Jonathan's nosy neighbor
- Lorenza Izzo as Mrs. Barnavelt, Lewis' mom and Jonathan's younger sister
- Kyle MacLachlan as Isaac Izard, Selena's husband, and a villainous warlock
- Vanessa Ann Williams as Rose Rita Pottinger, friend to Lewis

Director Eli Roth also makes a cameo as Comrade Ivan.

== Production ==
Principal photography on the film began on October 10, 2017, in Atlanta, Georgia. One of the challenges for the visual effects team was building massive 10-foot and 14½-foot gears for the Clock Room sequence. Another challenge was designing the Jack-o'-lantern characters, which included input from Steven Spielberg on the final designs. The soundtrack was composed by Nathan Barr and was released by Waxwork Records on a double LP.

== Release ==
The House with a Clock in Its Walls was released by Universal Pictures on September 21, 2018. The film was released for digital download on November 27, followed by a DVD, Blu-ray and Ultra HD Blu-ray release on December 18.

== Reception ==
=== Box office ===
The House with a Clock in its Walls has grossed $68.5 million in the United States and Canada, and $62.9 million in other territories, for a total worldwide gross of $131.5 million, against a production budget of $42 million.

In the United States and Canada, The House with a Clock in its Walls was released alongside Assassination Nation, Life Itself and Fahrenheit 11/9, and was projected to gross $15–20 million from 3,592 theaters in its opening weekend. The film made $7.8 million on its first day, including $840,000 from Thursday night previews. It went on to debut to $26.9 million, finishing first at the box office and marking the best opening of Roth's career, surpassing Hostel in 2006 ($19.6 million). In its second weekend the film made $12.5 million, finishing third behind newcomers Night School and Smallfoot.

Michael Jackson's short film Thriller was remastered in IMAX 3D for a limited engagement, preceding screenings of The House with a Clock in Its Walls in North America for its first week.

=== Critical response ===
On review aggregator Rotten Tomatoes, the film holds an approval rating of 65% based on 219 reviews, with an average rating of 6/10. The website's critical consensus reads: "An entertaining PG detour for gore maestro Eli Roth, The House with a Clock in Its Walls is a family-friendly blend of humor and horror with an infectious sense of fun". On Metacritic, the film has a weighted average score of 57 out of 100, based on 38 critics, indicating "mixed or average reviews". Audiences polled by CinemaScore gave the film an average grade of 'B+' on an A+ to F scale, while PostTrak reported filmgoers gave it 3.5 out of 5 stars.
