= Jock Morison =

Australian rules footballer, born 1914

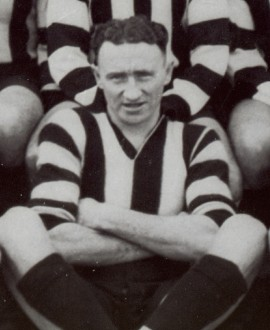
- Morison in 1939

Personal information
- Full name: John Morison
- Born: 5 December 1914; Seymour, Victoria
- Died: 10 March 1991 (aged 76); Heidelberg, Victoria
- Height: 178 cm (5 ft 10 in)
- Weight: 73.5 kg (162 lb)

Playing career^{1}
Years	Club	Games (Goals)
1939	Collingwood	5 (0)
- ^{1} Playing statistics correct to the end of 1939.

Jock Morison (5 December 1914 – 10 March 1991) was an Australian rules footballer who played with Collingwood in the Victorian Football League (VFL).

Morison later served in the Australian Army during World War II, spending time in north Borneo in 1945.
