= Günter Jochems =

German ice hockey player

- Born: November 5, 1928 Crimmitschau, Germany
- Died: 30 March 1991 (aged 62) Cologne, Germany
- Position: Centre
- Played for: Krefeld Pinguine
- National team: Germany
- Playing career: 1949–1965

Günter Jochems (5 November 1928 – 30 March 1991) was a professional ice hockey player. He represented Germany in the 1956 Winter Olympics.
