= Harry Townley =

Australian rules footballer, born 1905

Personal information
- Full name: James Henry Townley
- Born: 16 February 1905; Richmond, Victoria
- Died: 21 March 1991 (aged 86); Camberwell, Victoria
- Original team: Tooronga

Playing career^{1}
Years	Club	Games (Goals)
1927	Hawthorn	2 (0)
- ^{1} Playing statistics correct to the end of 1927.

James Henry Townley (16 February 1905 – 21 March 1991) was an Australian rules footballer who played with Hawthorn in the Victorian Football League (VFL).
