= The Dark Secret of Weatherend =

Book by John Bellairs

- Author: John Bellairs
- Illustrator: Edward Gorey
- Cover artist: Edward Gorey
- Series: Anthony Monday
- Publisher: Dial/Dutton/Penguin Books
- English publication date: 1984
- Media type: Print
- Pages: 182pp
- ISBN: 0-8037-0072-5
- Preceded by: The Treasure of Alpheus Winterborn
- Followed by: The Lamp from the Warlock's Tomb

The Dark Secret of Weatherend is a gothic fantasy novel directed at child readers. It was written by John Bellairs and originally published in 1984. The book was illustrated by Edward Gorey.

== Plot summary ==
Anthony and Myra Eells are touring the countryside near their hometown in Minnesota when they pass the old Weatherend estate, a dilapidated mansion where the eccentric J.K. Borkman once lived. Borkman was obsessed with the weather and spent his years monitoring the skies. Despite posted signs enforcing No Trespassing, Anthony and Ms. Eells explore the grounds and find grotesque statues symbolizing wind, hail, snow, and lightning and a small diary hidden in the floorboards of the garage. The two would-be treasure hunters take the book home as a souvenir.

Soon thereafter, Anthony and Ms. Eells are visited by Anders Borkman, the son of the man who built Weatherend, who has come to reclaim his father's book. Terrifying weather that can only be created by magic begins sweeping through Minnesota and Wisconsin, and Anthony and Ms. Eells realize all too quickly the connection between the weather and what's happening out at the justly named Weatherend estate.
