= The Lamp from the Warlock's Tomb =

1988 novel by John Bellairs

- Author: John Bellairs
- Illustrator: Edward Gorey
- Series: Anthony Monday
- Publisher: Dial/Dutton/Penguin Books
- English publication date: 1988
- Media type: Print
- Pages: 168pp
- ISBN: 0-8037-0512-3
- Preceded by: The Dark Secret of Weatherend
- Followed by: The Mansion in the Mist

The Lamp from the Warlock's Tomb is a gothic horror novel directed at child readers. Published in 1988, the novel is written by American writer John Bellairs and illustrated by Edward Gorey.

== Plot summary ==
Anthony Monday and Myra Eells live in Minnesota, where odd things begin to occur after the purchase of an antique oil lamp.

Late one night at his high school, Anthony burns the lamp as part of his science project. Later, when leaving the school, he sees a strange, cobweb-covered apparition. Anthony flees in terror, but trips over the dead body of the school's night watchman. Later, while walking home from the library, Anthony sees the withered corpse of the watchman in an antique shop.

Ms. Eells confides in her brother Emerson, an expert in the occult, about the strange lamp and the even stranger sights and sounds seemingly ignited by the lamp. Emerson soon discovers the oil lamp is one of three items (à la bell, book, and candle) that are keeping a sinister spirit at bay.
