= CBS Children's Mystery Theatre =

American television anthology series

CBS Children's Mystery Theatre is an American television anthology series aimed at teens and pre-teens. A total of five episodes were produced by and aired on CBS from 1980 to 1983.

== Episodes ==
- The Clue According to SHERLOCK HOLMES aka The Treasure of Alpheus T. Winterborn
- The Haunting of Harrington House
- Mystery at Fire Island
- The Zertigo Diamond Caper
- Dirkham Detective Agency

== Production ==
The stories were written to emphasize the importance of deductive reasoning.

Some of the featured actors included Edie Adams, Roscoe Lee Browne, Keith Coogan, Dominique Dunne, and Sally Kellerman.
