= 1921 Salford Borough Council election =

Local election in Salford

- 1 November 1921

16 of 64 seats on Salford County Borough Council 33 seats needed for a majority
	First party	Second party	Third party
Party	Conservative	Liberal	Labour
Last election	6 seats, 32.6%	5 seats, 17.3%	4 seats, 45.1%
Seats before	27	22	14
Seats won	5	5	3
Seats after	25	20	15
Seat change	▼2	▼2	▲1
Popular vote	13,087	4,538	11,752
Percentage	38.7%	13.4%	34.8%
Swing	▲6.1%	▼3.9%	▼10.8%
	Fourth party	Fifth party
Party	Independent	Ratepayers
Last election	1 seats, 5.0%	did not contest
Seats before	1	0
Seats won	2	1
Seats after	3	1
Seat change	▲2	▲1
Popular vote	3,134	1,228
Percentage	9.3%	3.6%
Swing	▲4.3%	N/A
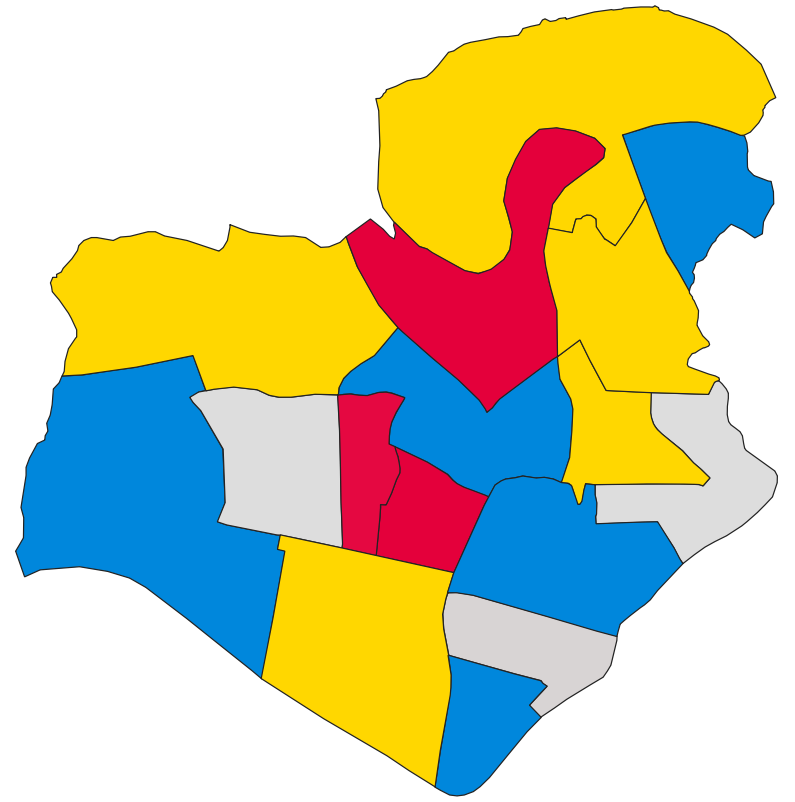
- Map of results of 1921 election
Leader of the Council before election
No overall control
Leader of the Council after election
No overall control

Elections to Salford Borough Council were held on Tuesday, 1 November 1921. One third of the councillors seats were up for election, with each successful candidate to serve a three-year term of office. Extensive ward boundary changes came into effect at this election, however, the number of councillors was retained and displaced members were allocated to newly created wards for the remainder of their terms.

The council remained under no overall control.

== Election result ==
Party	Votes		Seats			Full Council	
Conservative Party	13,087 (38.7%)	▲6.1	5 (31.3%)	5 / 16	Steady	25 (39.1%)	25 / 64
Liberal Party	4,538 (13.4%)	▼3.9	5 (31.3%)	5 / 16	▼4	20 (31.3%)	20 / 64
Labour Party	11,752 (34.8%)	▼10.3	3 (18.8%)	3 / 16	▲1	15 (23.4%)	15 / 64
Independent	3,134 (9.3%)	▲4.3	2 (12.6%)	2 / 16	▲2	3 (4.7%)	3 / 64
Ratepayers	1,228 (3.6%)	N/A	1 (6.3%)	1 / 16	▲1	1 (1.6%)	1 / 64
Communist	61 (0.2%)	N/A	0 (0.0%)	0 / 16	N/A	0 (0.0%)	0 / 64

=== Full council ===
↓
15	20	3	1	25

=== Aldermen ===
↓
7	9

=== Councillors ===
↓
15	13	3	1	16

== Ward results ==
=== Albert Park ===
Albert Park
Party	Candidate	Votes	%	±%
Liberal	G. Hindle*	uncontested		
Liberal hold		Swing		

=== Charlestown ===
Charlestown
Party	Candidate	Votes	%	±%
Labour	J. J. Richardson	1,439	59.6	
Liberal	J. Cannon*	976	40.4	
Majority		463	19.2	
Turnout		2,415		
Labour gain from Liberal		Swing		

=== Claremont ===
Claremont
Party	Candidate	Votes	%	±%
Liberal	J. Connolly	1,456	58.9	
Conservative	J. Royle	1,015	41.1	
Majority		441	17.8	
Turnout		2,471		
Liberal hold		Swing		

=== Crescent ===
Crescent
Party	Candidate	Votes	%	±%
Conservative	H. S. Hind*	1,566	56.4	
Labour	J. W. Hamson	1,210	43.6	
Majority		356	12.8	
Turnout		2,776		
Conservative hold		Swing		

=== Docks ===
Docks
Party	Candidate	Votes	%	±%
Liberal	E. Howe*	1,252	71.3	
Labour	E. Moulson	505	28.7	
Majority		747	42.6	
Turnout		1,757		
Liberal hold		Swing		

=== Kersal ===
Kersal
Party	Candidate	Votes	%	±%
Liberal	E. Sutton*	uncontested		
Liberal hold		Swing		

=== Langworthy ===
Langworthy
Party	Candidate	Votes	%	±%
Labour	S. Delves*	1,942	67.6	
Conservative	T. Swanston	868	30.2	
Communist	W. L. McGinley	61	2.2	
Majority		1,074	37.4	
Turnout		2,871		
Labour hold		Swing		

=== Mandley Park ===
Mandley Park
Party	Candidate	Votes	%	±%
Conservative	W. Armstrong	2,119	71.3	
Liberal	G. Brown*	854	28.7	
Majority		1,265	42.6	
Turnout		2,973		
Conservative gain from Liberal		Swing		

=== Ordsall Park ===
Ordsall Park
Party	Candidate	Votes	%	±%
Conservative	J. Bratherton*	1,317	51.6	
Labour	T. Neavsey	1,235	48.4	
Majority		82	3.2	
Turnout		2,552		
Conservative hold		Swing		

=== Regent ===
Regent
Party	Candidate	Votes	%	±%
Ratepayers	G. R. Greatorex	1,228	55.4	
Conservative	H. Hodson	990	44.6	
Majority		238	10.8	
Turnout		2,218		
Ratepayers gain from Conservative		Swing		

=== St. Matthias' ===
St. Matthias'
Party	Candidate	Votes	%	±%
Liberal	J. Rothwell*	uncontested		
Liberal hold		Swing		

=== St. Paul's ===
St. Paul's
Party	Candidate	Votes	%	±%
Labour	J. W. Bloom	1,502	58.8	
Conservative	J. Jones*	1,054	41.2	
Majority		448	17.6	
Turnout		2,556		
Labour gain from Conservative		Swing		

=== St. Thomas' ===
St. Thomas'
Party	Candidate	Votes	%	±%
Conservative	J. Fitzgerald Jones	1,587	50.7	
Labour	J. Gorman*	1,545	49.3	
Majority		42	1.4	
Turnout		3,132		
Conservative gain from Labour		Swing		

=== Seedley ===
Seedley
Party	Candidate	Votes	%	±%
Independent	G. R. Bennett	1,624	57.7	
Labour	H. Mottershead	1,192	42.3	
Majority		432	15.4	
Turnout		2,816		
Independent gain from Conservative		Swing		

=== Trinity ===
Trinity
Party	Candidate	Votes	%	±%
Independent	D. F. Kelly	1,510	43.1	
Conservative	J. H. Murch	1,345	38.4	
Labour	J. Dykes	645	18.5	
Majority		165	4.7	
Turnout		3,500		
Independent gain from Conservative		Swing		

=== Weaste ===
Weaste
Party	Candidate	Votes	%	±%
Conservative	J. F. Emery	1,226	69.5	
Labour	J. W. Kay	537	30.5	
Majority		689	39.0	
Turnout		1,763		
Conservative hold		Swing		

== Aldermanic elections ==
=== Aldermanic election, 3 May 1922 ===
Caused by the death on 7 April 1922 of Alderman William Hale (Liberal, elected as an alderman by the council on 4 August 1915).

In his place, Councillor J. P. McDougall (Liberal, St. Paul's, elected 1 November 1920; previously 1901–19) was elected as an alderman by the council on 3 May 1922.

Party	Alderman	Ward	Term expires
Liberal	J. P. McDougall		1923

=== Aldermanic election, 2 August 1922 ===
Caused by the death on 22 July 1922 of Alderman John Griffiths (Conservative, elected as an alderman by the council on 2 September 1903).

In his place, Councillor S. H. Kettle (Conservative, Crescent, elected 1 November 1901) was elected as an alderman by the council on 2 August 1922.

Party	Alderman	Ward	Term expires
Conservative	S. H. Kettle	Docks	1926

=== Aldermanic election, 25 October 1922 ===
Caused by the resignation on 4 October 1922 of Alderman Alfred Worsley (Liberal, elected as an alderman by the council on 6 May 1903).

In his place, Councillor Joseph Willett (Liberal, St. Matthias', elected 31 January 1906) was elected as an alderman by the council on 25 October 1922.

Party	Alderman	Ward	Term expires
Liberal	Joseph Willett		1923

== By-elections between 1921 and 1922 ==
=== St. Paul's, 19 May 1922 ===
Caused by the election as an alderman of Councillor J. P. McDougall (Liberal, St. Paul's, elected 1 November 1920; previously 1901–19) on 3 May 1922, following the death on 7 April 1922 of Alderman William Hale (Liberal, elected as an alderman by the council on 4 August 1915).

St. Paul's
Party	Candidate	Votes	%	±%
Independent	O. O. W. Simpson	899	32.0	N/A
Independent	M. Shutt	731	26.1	N/A
Labour	T. Neafsey	607	21.6	−37.2
Conservative	C. Gilbert	569	20.3	−20.9
Majority		168	5.9	
Turnout		2,806		
Independent gain from Liberal		Swing		

=== Crescent, 29 August 1922 ===
Caused by the election as an alderman of Councillor S. H. Kettle (Conservative, Crescent, elected 1 November 1901) on 2 August 1922, following the death on 22 July 1922 of Alderman John Griffiths (Conservative, elected as an alderman by the council on 2 September 1903).

Crescent
Party	Candidate	Votes	%	±%
Labour	E. A. Hardy	1,894	54.1	+10.5
Conservative	C. Gilbert	1,606	45.9	−10.5
Majority		288	8.2	
Turnout		3,500		
Labour gain from Conservative		Swing		
