= Mary Pollock Grant =

British politician (1876–1957)

- Born: 2 December 1876; Partick, Glasgow, Scotland
- Died: August 1957 (aged 80); Tunbridge Wells
- Occupations: Suffragette, politician, missionary, and policewoman

Mary Pollock Grant (2 December 1876 – August 1957), also known as Marion Pollock, was a Scottish suffragette, Liberal Party politician, missionary and policewoman.

== Early life and work ==
Grant was born in Partick, Glasgow, the eldest daughter of Dr Charles Martin Grant, the minister of St Mark's parish church in Dundee, and his wife, Eliza (Muirhead) Grant. She was educated at the High School of Dundee and in Nordausques, France. She worked as a Church of Scotland missionary in Scotland and from 1905 she became an educational Missionary in India.

== Women's rights ==
In 1911, after returning to Scotland from India she worked for women's rights in Dundee as a member of the militant Women's Social and Political Union. In December 1912 she was imprisoned at Perth Prison for smuggling herself with others into the Music Hall in Aberdeen. They had intended to disrupt a Liberal meeting with the then Chancellor of the Exchequer, David Lloyd George. She was imprisoned at Perth under the name Marion Pollock.

Throughout 1913 and 1914 she campaigned including speaking against the 'Cat and Mouse Act' and force-feeding of women to a public meeting at the Wallace Statue, in Aberdeen, wrote many letters to the press and was regularly removed from public meetings for being disruptive, again in the Music Hall, she planned to disrupt Irish M.P, T.P. O'Connor, but was not allowed in. On another occasion, disguised in widow's tweeds and glasses, she managed to get into a Labour meeting held by Ramsay MacDonald in the Gilfillan Memorial Hall, but was roughly dragged out by eight burly men – an onlooker describes this as "one of the strongest arguments for women’s suffrage that I have ever seen."

== World War I ==
At the outbreak of war in 1914 she enlisted as a nurse with the Voluntary Aid Detachment at Caird Hospital, Dundee. In 1916 she joined Margaret Damer Dawson's Women Police Service, working first in a munitions factory and then serving in London as a Constable, then a Sergeant and, by 1918, had reached the rank of Sub-Inspector. She left the organisation at the end of the war.

== Political career ==
After the war Grant became involved in politics and joined the Liberal party. To go from suffragette to policewoman to Liberal politician was a path also trodden by Mary Sophia Allen. By 1922, she was spending much of her time as a public lecturer on politics and social problems. She was then selected as a David Lloyd George supporting Liberal candidate for Leeds South East constituency for the general election. Her opponent was the sitting Labour MP James O'Grady, who had been returned unopposed in 1918. As there was no Unionist candidate she polled a strong vote but did not win.

General Election 1922: Leeds South East Electorate 35,074
Party	Candidate	Votes	%	±%
Labour	James O'Grady	13,676	58.9	n/a
National Liberal	Mary Pollock Grant	9,554	41.1	n/a
Majority		4,122	17.8	n/a
Turnout			66.2	n/a
Labour hold		Swing	n/a	

After the Lloyd George and H. H. Asquith wings of the Liberals re-united, she stood as Liberal candidate in Pontefract, where the Liberal candidate had come third in 1922. Once again it was a three-cornered contest and Grant was unable to avoid a squeeze on the Liberal vote;

General Election 1923: Pontefract Electorate 33,425
Party	Candidate	Votes	%	±%
Labour	Tom Smith	11,134	45.3	
Unionist	Albert Braithwaite	8,872	36.1	
Liberal	Mary Pollock Grant	4,567	18.6	
Majority		2,262	9.2	
Turnout			73.5	
Labour hold		Swing		

She did not contest the 1924 General Election. By July 1928 she was selected as Liberal candidate for Salford West, another Labour/Unionist marginal where the Liberals were not expected to do that well. She again finished third.

General Election 1929: Salford West Electorate 43,806
Party	Candidate	Votes	%	±%
Labour	Alexander Haycock	15,647	42.8	
Unionist	Frederick Astbury	15,289	41.8	
Liberal	Mary Pollock Grant	5,614	15.4	
Majority		358	1.0	
Turnout			83.4	
Labour gain from Unionist		Swing		

== Later life ==
In the 1930s she became a Christian Scientist and worked as a healer for 20 years. She undertook civil defence work in London during the Second World War. In 1953 she was disabled by a stroke. She died in August 1957 in Tunbridge Wells.
