= 1927 Salford City Council election =

Local election in Salford

- 1 November 1927

16 of 64 seats on Salford City Council 33 seats needed for a majority
	First party	Second party	Third party
Party	Labour	Conservative	Liberal
Last election	7 seats, 47.9%	2 seats, 23.1%	2 seats, 3.8%
Seats before	25	19	11
Seats won	5	6	2
Seats after	23	21	11
Seat change	▼2	▲2	Steady
Popular vote	25,390	19,678	4,697
Percentage	46.1%	35.8%	8.5%
Swing	▼1.8%	▲12.7%	▲4.7%
	Fourth party	Fifth party
Party	Ratepayers	Independent
Last election	2 seats, 10.7%	3 seats, 14.5%
Seats before	5	4
Seats won	2	1
Seats after	5	4
Seat change	Steady	Steady
Popular vote	3,739	1,524
Percentage	6.8%	2.8%
Swing	▼3.9%	▼11.7%
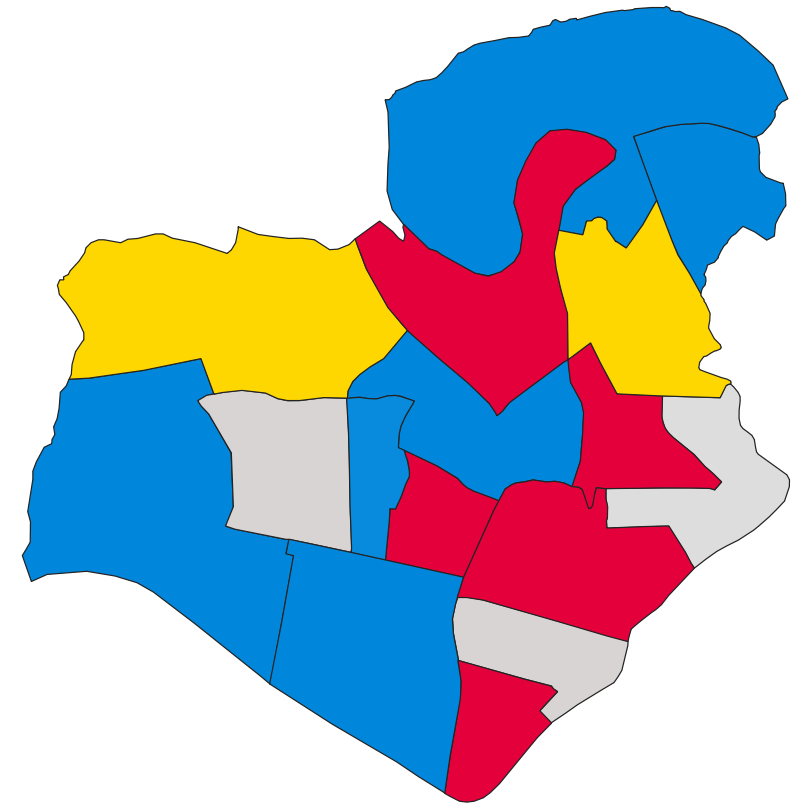
- Map of results of 1927 election
Leader of the Council before election
No overall control
Leader of the Council after election
No overall control

Elections to Salford City Council were held on Tuesday, 1 November 1927. One third of the councillors seats were up for election, with each successful candidate to serve a three-year term of office. The council remained under no overall control.

== Election result ==
Party	Votes		Seats			Full Council	
Labour Party	25,390 (46.1%)	▼1.8	5 (31.3%)	5 / 16	▼2	23 (35.9%)	23 / 64
Conservative Party	19,678 (35.8%)	▲12.7	6 (37.5%)	6 / 16	▲2	21 (32.8%)	21 / 64
Liberal Party	4,687 (8.5%)	▲4.7	2 (12.5%)	2 / 16	Steady	11 (17.2%)	11 / 64
Ratepayers	3,739 (6.8%)	▼3.9	2 (12.5%)	2 / 16	Steady	5 (7.8%)	5 / 64
Independent	1,524 (2.8%)	▼11.7	1 (6.3%)	1 / 16	Steady	4 (6.3%)	4 / 64

=== Full council ===
↓
23	11	4	5	21

=== Aldermen ===
↓
1	6	9

=== Councillors ===
↓
22	5	4	5	12

== Ward results ==
=== Albert Park ===
Albert Park
Party	Candidate	Votes	%	±%
Liberal	G. Hindle*	2,516	62.1	+57.2
Labour	A. M. Atherton	1,533	37.9	−7.1
Majority		983	24.2	
Turnout		4,049	58.6	
Liberal hold		Swing		

=== Charlestown ===
Charlestown
Party	Candidate	Votes	%	±%
Labour	J. J. Richardson*	2,574	58.4	−0.2
Conservative	F. Parr	1,836	41.6	+0.2
Majority		738	16.8	−0.4
Turnout		4,410	66.4	
Labour hold		Swing		

=== Claremont ===
Claremont
Party	Candidate	Votes	%	±%
Liberal	J. Connolly*	2,171	78.0	N/A
Labour	W. Landers	613	22.0	N/A
Majority		1,558	56.0	N/A
Turnout		2,784	63.0	N/A
Liberal hold		Swing		

=== Crescent ===
Crescent
Party	Candidate	Votes	%	±%
Labour	A. Worthington	1,902	52.4	+5.1
Conservative	L. Green	1,726	47.6	N/A
Majority		176	4.8	
Turnout		3,628	54.2	
Labour hold		Swing		

=== Docks ===
Docks
Party	Candidate	Votes	%	±%
Conservative	J. T. Harrison	1,799	57.4	+6.2
Labour	J. H. R. Caldwell	1,334	42.6	−6.2
Majority		465	14.8	+12.4
Turnout		3,133	59.5	
Conservative gain from Ratepayers		Swing		

=== Kersal ===
Kersal
Party	Candidate	Votes	%	±%
Conservative	W. Crookell*	1,805	74.5	N/A
Labour	H. O. Jones	617	25.5	−0.3
Majority		1,188	49.0	
Turnout		2,422	47.7	
Conservative hold		Swing		

=== Langworthy ===
Langworthy
Party	Candidate	Votes	%	±%
Conservative	T. W. Buck	1,730	51.2	+3.3
Labour	J. Gorman	1,648	48.8	−3.3
Majority		82	2.4	
Turnout		3,378	62.3	
Conservative gain from Labour		Swing		

=== Mandley Park ===
Mandley Park
Party	Candidate	Votes	%	±%
Conservative	W. Armstrong*	2,285	56.5	N/A
Labour	G. H. Pearson	1,762	43.5	−7.6
Majority		523	13.0	
Turnout		4,047	62.1	
Conservative hold		Swing		

=== Ordsall Park ===
Ordsall Park
Party	Candidate	Votes	%	±%
Labour	G. W. Sands*	2,192	62.6	+3.9
Conservative	E. Mutch	1,309	37.4	−3.9
Majority		883	25.2	+7.8
Turnout		3,501	51.8	
Labour hold		Swing		

=== Regent ===
Regent
Party	Candidate	Votes	%	±%
Ratepayers	G. R. Greatorex*	1,913	50.8	N/A
Labour	A. Worthington	1,855	49.2	−0.9
Majority		58	1.6	
Turnout		3,768	54.1	
Ratepayers hold		Swing		

=== St. Matthias' ===
St. Matthias'
Party	Candidate	Votes	%	±%
Labour	F. Cowin	2,076	52.2	+7.9
Conservative	F. W. Beresford	1,898	47.8	N/A
Majority		178	4.4	
Turnout		3,974	60.6	
Labour hold		Swing		

=== St. Paul's ===
St. Paul's
Party	Candidate	Votes	%	±%
Labour	T. Milber*	1,794	58.1	+5.4
Conservative	G. W. Smith	1,293	41.9	N/A
Majority		501	16.2	+10.8
Turnout		3,087	54.3	
Labour hold		Swing		

=== St. Thomas' ===
St. Thomas'
Party	Candidate	Votes	%	±%
Conservative	J. Fitzgerald Jones*	1,963	50.1	+2.7
Labour	F. E. Monks	1,962	49.9	−2.7
Majority		1	0.2	
Turnout		3,925	66.8	
Conservative hold		Swing		

=== Seedley ===
Seedley
Party	Candidate	Votes	%	±%
Ratepayers	C. J. Townsend	1,826	63.1	−6.5
Labour	H. S. Vickers*	1,066	36.9	+6.5
Majority		760	26.2	−13.0
Turnout		2,892	62.6	
Ratepayers gain from Labour		Swing		

=== Trinity ===
Trinity
Party	Candidate	Votes	%	±%
Independent	D. P. Kelly*	1,524	53.1	−0.8
Labour	J. T. Tattersall	1,346	46.9	+0.8
Majority		178	6.2	−1.6
Turnout		2,870	51.3	
Independent hold		Swing		

=== Weaste ===
Weaste
Party	Candidate	Votes	%	±%
Conservative	J. F. Emery*	2,034	64.6	N/A
Labour	W. Neil	1,116	35.4	−5.3
Majority		918	29.2	
Turnout		3,150	59.1	
Conservative hold		Swing		

== By-elections between 1927 and 1928 ==
=== Weaste, 18 January 1928 ===
Caused by the resignation of Councillor H. Walton Starkey (Ratepayers, Weaste, elected 1 November 1923) on 4 January 1928.

Weaste
Party	Candidate	Votes	%	±%
Conservative	T. Nuttall	1,314	53.9	−10.7
Labour	W. Neil	752	30.8	−4.6
Liberal	G. Clare	373	15.3	N/A
Majority		562	23.1	−6.1
Turnout		2,439		
Conservative gain from Ratepayers		Swing		

=== St. Thomas', 26 June 1928 ===
Caused by the death of Councillor Major John Fizgerald Jones (Conservative, St. Thomas', elected 1 November 1921) on 18 May 1928.

St. Thomas'
Party	Candidate	Votes	%	±%
Labour	F. E. Monks	1,747	57.2	+7.3
Conservative	H. Potter	1,306	42.8	−7.3
Majority		441	14.4	
Turnout		3,053		
Labour gain from Conservative		Swing		
