= 1924 Salford Borough Council election =

Local election in Salford

- 1 November 1924

16 of 64 seats on Salford County Borough Council 33 seats needed for a majority
	First party	Second party	Third party
Party	Conservative	Labour	Liberal
Last election	5 seats, 33.8%	5 seats, 31.9%	2 seats, 9.2%
Seats before	21	15	15
Seats won	4	6	3
Seats after	19	18	14
Seat change	▼2	▲3	▼1
Popular vote	15,868	20,841	8,715
Percentage	31.7%	41.6%	17.4%
Swing	▼2.1%	▲9.7%	▲8.2%
	Fourth party	Fifth party
Party	Independent	Ratepayers
Last election	3 seats, 19.4%	1 seats, 5.7%
Seats before	8	5
Seats won	1	2
Seats after	7	6
Seat change	▼1	▲1
Popular vote	0	4,616
Percentage	0.0%	9.2%
Swing	▼19.4%	▲3.5%
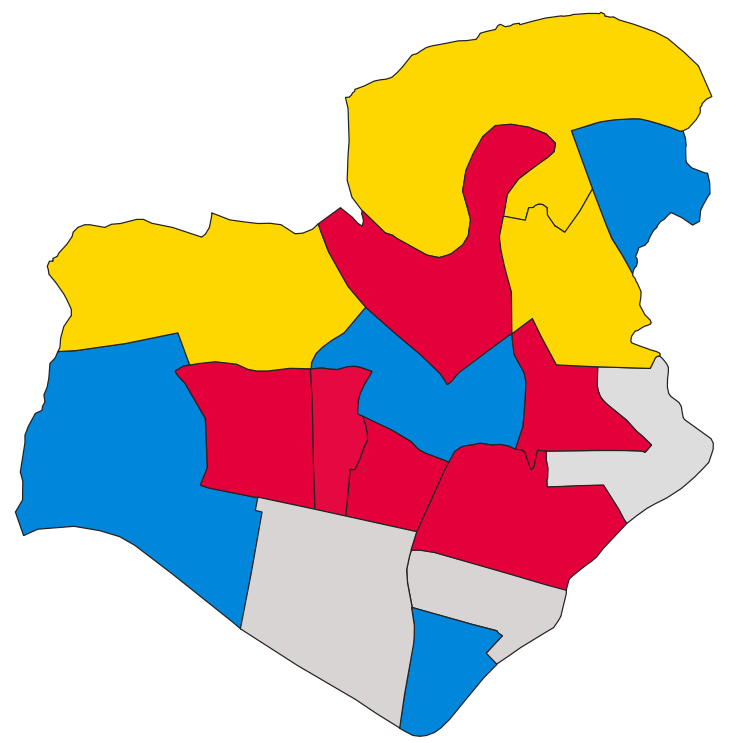
- Map of results of 1924 election
Leader of the Council before election
No overall control
Leader of the Council after election
No overall control

Elections to Salford Borough Council were held on Saturday, 1 November 1924. One third of the councillors seats were up for election, with each successful candidate to serve a three-year term of office. The council remained under no overall control.

== Election result ==
Party	Votes		Seats			Full Council	
Conservative Party	15,868 (31.7%)	▼2.1	4 (25.0%)	4 / 16	▼2	19 (29.7%)	19 / 64
Labour Party	20,841 (41.6%)	▲9.7	6 (37.5%)	6 / 16	▲3	18 (28.1%)	18 / 64
Liberal Party	8,715 (17.4%)	▲8.2	3 (18.8%)	3 / 16	▼1	14 (21.9%)	14 / 64
Independent	0 (0.0%)	▼19.4	1 (6.3%)	1 / 16	▼1	7 (10.9%)	7 / 64
Ratepayers	4,616 (9.2%)	▲3.5	2 (12.5%)	2 / 16	▲1	6 (9.4%)	6 / 64

=== Full council ===
↓
18	14	7	6	19

=== Aldermen ===
↓
7	9

=== Councillors ===
↓
18	7	7	6	10

== Ward results ==
=== Albert Park ===
Albert Park
Party	Candidate	Votes	%	±%
Liberal	G. Hindle*	2,404	62.6	N/A
Conservative	G. Fearnehough	1,437	37.4	−8.2
Majority		967	25.2	
Turnout		3,841		
Liberal hold		Swing		

=== Charlestown ===
Charlestown
Party	Candidate	Votes	%	±%
Labour	J. J. Richardson*	2,376	50.1	+8.4
Liberal	F. Gregory	2,372	49.9	+15.3
Majority		4	0.2	−6.9
Turnout		4,748		
Labour hold		Swing		

=== Claremont ===
Claremont
Party	Candidate	Votes	%	±%
Liberal	J. Connolly*	2,146	76.7	N/A
Labour	J. Openshaw	651	23.3	N/A
Majority		1,495	53.4	N/A
Turnout		2,797		
Liberal hold		Swing		

=== Crescent ===
Crescent
Party	Candidate	Votes	%	±%
Labour	J. Lancaster	2,316	62.6	+14.9
Conservative	H. S. Hind*	1,384	37.4	N/A
Majority		932	25.2	
Turnout		3,700		
Labour gain from Conservative		Swing		

=== Docks ===
Docks
Party	Candidate	Votes	%	±%
Ratepayers	H. Ashford	1,702	65.2	N/A
Labour	J. R. Wood	910	34.8	N/A
Majority		792	30.4	N/A
Turnout		2,612		
Ratepayers gain from Liberal		Swing		

=== Kersal ===
Kersal
Party	Candidate	Votes	%	±%
Liberal	E. Sutton*	1,793	80.9	+28.7
Labour	M. Roberts	424	19.1	N/A
Majority		1,369	61.8	+57.4
Turnout		2,217		
Liberal hold		Swing		

=== Langworthy ===
Langworthy
Party	Candidate	Votes	%	±%
Labour	S. Delves*	2,118	62.8	N/A
Conservative	A. Hestford	1,252	37.2	N/A
Majority		866	25.6	N/A
Turnout		3,370		
Labour hold		Swing		

=== Mandley Park ===
Mandley Park
Party	Candidate	Votes	%	±%
Conservative	W. Armstrong*	1,976	62.2	+19.2
Labour	W. Bowen	1,201	37.8	N/A
Majority		775	24.4	
Turnout		3,177		
Conservative hold		Swing		

=== Ordsall Park ===
Ordsall Park
Party	Candidate	Votes	%	±%
Conservative	J. Bratherton*	1,786	51.2	N/A
Labour	T. Walsh	1,702	48.8	N/A
Majority		84	2.4	N/A
Turnout		3,488		
Conservative hold		Swing		

=== Regent ===
Regent
Party	Candidate	Votes	%	±%
Ratepayers	G. R. Greatorex*	1,973	58.3	N/A
Labour	W. H. Cuddeford	1,413	41.7	−0.5
Majority		560	16.6	
Turnout		3,386		
Ratepayers hold		Swing		

=== St. Matthias' ===
St. Matthias'
Party	Candidate	Votes	%	±%
Labour	J. A. Webb	2,294	53.8	N/A
Conservative	J. W. Cain*	1,966	46.2	−1.4
Majority		328	7.6	
Turnout		4,260		
Labour gain from Conservative		Swing		

=== St. Paul's ===
St. Paul's
Party	Candidate	Votes	%	±%
Labour	T. Milber*	1,634	50.6	+5.4
Conservative	J. Binns	1,593	49.4	N/A
Majority		41	1.2	
Turnout		3,227		
Labour hold		Swing		

=== St. Thomas' ===
St. Thomas'
Party	Candidate	Votes	%	±%
Conservative	J. Fitzgerald Jones*	1,820	51.4	+1.9
Labour	J. W. Kay	1,722	48.6	−1.9
Majority		98	2.8	
Turnout		3,542		
Conservative hold		Swing		

=== Seedley ===
Seedley
Party	Candidate	Votes	%	±%
Labour	H. S. Vickers	1,114	38.9	N/A
Ratepayers	C. J. Townsend	941	32.8	N/A
Conservative	G. Johnson	811	28.3	N/A
Majority		173	6.1	N/A
Turnout		2,866		
Labour gain from Independent		Swing		

=== Trinity ===
Trinity
Party	Candidate	Votes	%	±%
Independent	D. P. Kelly*	uncontested		
Independent hold		Swing		

=== Weaste ===
Weaste
Party	Candidate	Votes	%	±%
Conservative	J. F. Emery*	1,843	65.6	N/A
Labour	A. Millwood	966	34.4	N/A
Majority		877	31.2	N/A
Turnout		2,809		
Conservative hold		Swing		

== Aldermanic elections ==
=== Aldermanic election, 10 June 1925 ===
Caused by the death on 30 May 1925 of Alderman W. H. Barrett (Conservative, elected as an alderman by the council on 11 December 1918).

In his place, Councillor Abraham Williamson (Conservative, Ordsall Park, elected 1 November 1907) was elected as an alderman by the council on 10 June 1925.

Party	Alderman	Ward	Term expires
Conservative	Abraham Williamson	St. Paul's	1926

=== Aldermanic election, 7 October 1925 ===
Caused by the death on 7 December 1918 of Alderman William Ollier (Conservative, elected as an alderman by the council on 4 January 1899).

In his place, Councillor Samuel Delves (Labour, Langworthy, elected 2 November 1908) was elected as an alderman by the council on 7 October 1925.

Party	Alderman	Ward	Term expires
Labour	Samuel Delves		1929

== By-elections between 1924 and 1925 ==
=== Crescent, 18 December 1924 ===
Caused by the resignation of Councillor Clifford Gilbert (Conservative, Crescent, elected 22 June 1923) on 3 December 1924.

Crescent
Party	Candidate	Votes	%	±%
Labour	A. Millwood	1,381	64.1	+1.5
Conservative	H. S. Hind	774	35.9	−1.5
Majority		607	28.2	+3.0
Turnout		2,155		
Labour gain from Conservative		Swing		

=== Ordsall Park, 30 June 1925 ===
Caused by the election as an alderman of Councillor Abraham Williamson (Conservative, Ordsall Park, elected 1 November 1907) on 10 June 1925, following the death on 30 May 1925 of Alderman W. H. Barrett (Conservative, elected as an alderman by the council on 11 December 1918).

Ordsall Park
Party	Candidate	Votes	%	±%
Labour	T. Walsh	1,936	51.8	+3.0
Conservative	E. Bradburn	1,804	48.2	−3.0
Majority		132	3.6	
Turnout		3,740		
Labour gain from Conservative		Swing		

=== Langworthy, 21 October 1925 ===
Caused by the election as an alderman of Councillor Samuel Delves (Labour, Langworthy, elected 2 November 1908) on 7 October 1925, following the death on 7 December 1918 of Alderman William Ollier (Conservative, elected as an alderman by the council on 4 January 1899).

Langworthy
Party	Candidate	Votes	%	±%
Labour	J. Openshaw	1,677	63.9	+1.1
Conservative	H. Parr	949	36.1	−1.1
Majority		728	27.8	+2.2
Turnout		2,626		
Labour hold		Swing		
