= 1923 Salford Borough Council election =

Local election in Salford

- 1 November 1923

16 of 64 seats on Salford County Borough Council 33 seats needed for a majority
	First party	Second party	Third party
Party	Conservative	Liberal	Labour
Last election	5 seats, 28.1%	2 seats, 6.9%	5 seats, 37.3%
Seats before	24	17	13
Seats won	3	2	5
Seats after	23	15	13
Seat change	▼2	▼1	Steady
Popular vote	10,023	2,719	9,444
Percentage	33.8%	9.2%	31.9%
Swing	▲5.7%	▲2.3%	▼5.4%
	Fourth party	Fifth party
Party	Independent	Ratepayers
Last election	3 seats, 24.0%	1 seats, 3.6%
Seats before	8	2
Seats won	3	3
Seats after	8	5
Seat change	Steady	▲3
Popular vote	5,734	1,695
Percentage	19.4%	5.7%
Swing	▼4.6%	▲2.1%
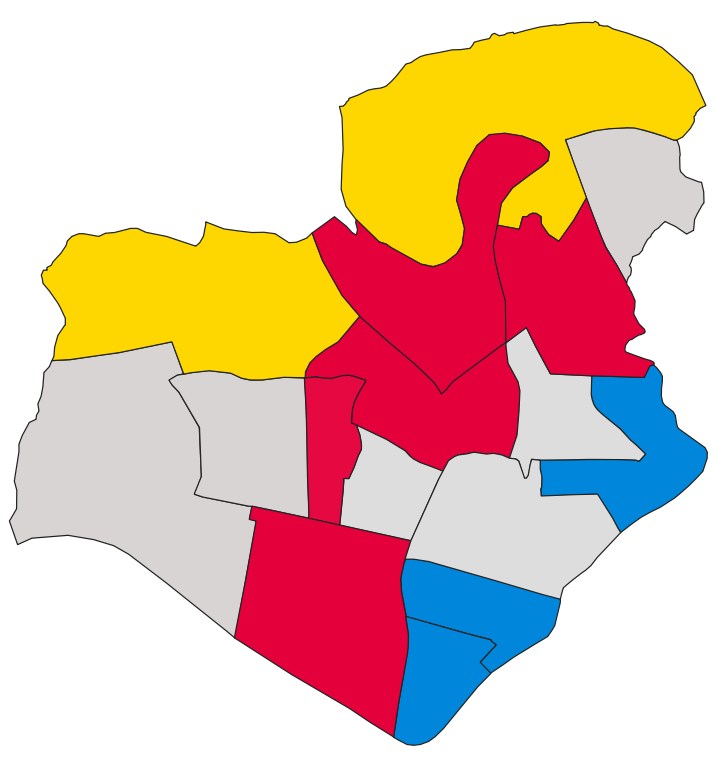
- Map of results of 1923 election
Leader of the Council before election
No overall control
Leader of the Council after election
No overall control

Elections to Salford Borough Council were held on Thursday, 1 November 1923. One third of the councillors seats were up for election, with each successful candidate to serve a three-year term of office. The council remained under no overall control.

== Election result ==
Party	Votes		Seats			Full Council	
Conservative Party	10,023 (33.8%)	▲5.7	3 (18.8%)	3 / 16	▼2	23 (35.9%)	23 / 64
Liberal Party	2,719 (9.2%)	▲2.3	2 (12.5%)	2 / 16	▼1	15 (23.4%)	15 / 64
Labour Party	9,444 (31.9%)	▼5.4	5 (31.3%)	5 / 16	Steady	13 (20.3%)	13 / 64
Independent	5,734 (19.4%)	▼4.6	3 (18.8%)	3 / 16	Steady	8 (12.5%)	8 / 64
Ratepayers	1,695 (5.7%)	▲2.1	3 (18.8%)	3 / 16	▲3	5 (7.8%)	5 / 64

=== Full council ===
↓
13	15	8	5	23

=== Aldermen ===
↓
7	9

=== Councillors ===
↓
13	8	8	5	14

== Ward results ==
=== Albert Park ===
Albert Park
Party	Candidate	Votes	%	±%
Labour	A. Atherton*	2,007	54.4	+18.7
Conservative	G. Fearnehough	1,682	45.6	−18.7
Majority		325	8.8	
Turnout		3,689		
Labour hold		Swing		

=== Charlestown ===
Charlestown
Party	Candidate	Votes	%	±%
Labour	G. Howard	1,871	41.7	+3.2
Liberal	F. Gregory	1,554	34.6	−3.8
Conservative	W. Crossley*	1,063	23.7	N/A
Majority		317	7.1	+7.0
Turnout		4,488		
Labour gain from Conservative		Swing		

=== Claremont ===
Claremont
Party	Candidate	Votes	%	±%
Liberal	A. H. Collins*	uncontested		
Liberal gain from Independent		Swing		

=== Crescent ===
Crescent
Party	Candidate	Votes	%	±%
Independent	J. Higginbottom*	2,149	52.3	N/A
Labour	E. A. Hardy*	1,959	47.7	+7.2
Majority		190	4.6	
Turnout		4,108		
Independent gain from Labour		Swing		

=== Docks ===
Docks
Party	Candidate	Votes	%	±%
Labour	G. W. Sands*	uncontested		
Labour hold		Swing		

=== Kersal ===
Kersal
Party	Candidate	Votes	%	±%
Liberal	J. Jackson*	1,165	52.2	−10.2
Conservative	W. Crookell	1,067	47.8	+10.2
Majority		98	4.4	−20.4
Turnout		2,232		
Liberal hold		Swing		

=== Langworthy ===
Langworthy
Party	Candidate	Votes	%	±%
Labour	E. E. Dale*	uncontested		
Labour hold		Swing		

=== Mandley Park ===
Mandley Park
Party	Candidate	Votes	%	±%
Ratepayers	G. Brown	1,695	57.0	N/A
Conservative	E. R. Atkinson	1,279	43.0	−16.6
Majority		416	14.0	
Turnout		2,974		
Ratepayers gain from Liberal		Swing		

=== Ordsall Park ===
Ordsall Park
Party	Candidate	Votes	%	±%
Conservative	A. Williamson*	uncontested		
Conservative hold		Swing		

=== Regent ===
Regent
Party	Candidate	Votes	%	±%
Conservative	A. Worthington*	1,432	57.8	+0.9
Labour	E. G. J. Edge	1,046	42.2	−0.9
Majority		386	15.6	+1.8
Turnout		2,478		
Conservative hold		Swing		

=== St. Matthias' ===
St. Matthias'
Party	Candidate	Votes	%	±%
Independent	M. Moylan*	2,264	52.4	−2.6
Conservative	W. Middleton	2,054	47.6	N/A
Majority		210	4.8	−5.2
Turnout		4,318		
Independent hold		Swing		

=== St. Paul's ===
St. Paul's
Party	Candidate	Votes	%	±%
Independent	O. O. W. Simpson*	1,321	54.8	−3.4
Labour	J. Boyes	1,088	45.2	+3.4
Majority		233	9.6	−6.8
Turnout		2,409		
Independent hold		Swing		

=== St. Thomas' ===
St. Thomas'
Party	Candidate	Votes	%	±%
Labour	J. W. Bloom*	1,473	50.5	−1.6
Conservative	G. Johnson	1,446	49.5	+1.6
Majority		27	1.0	−3.2
Turnout		2,919		
Labour hold		Swing		

=== Seedley ===
Seedley
Party	Candidate	Votes	%	±%
Ratepayers	W. F. Cuttiford	uncontested		
Ratepayers gain from Conservative		Swing		

=== Trinity ===
Trinity
Party	Candidate	Votes	%	±%
Conservative	W. S. Roberts*	uncontested		
Conservative hold		Swing		

=== Weaste ===
Weaste
Party	Candidate	Votes	%	±%
Ratepayers	H. W. Starkey	uncontested		
Ratepayers gain from Liberal		Swing		

== Aldermanic elections ==
=== Aldermanic election, 9 November 1923 ===
At the meeting of the council on 9 November 1923, the terms of office of eight aldermen expired.

The following eight were elected as aldermen by the council on 9 November 1923 for a term of six years.

Party	Alderman	Ward	Term expires
Liberal	George Barker*		1929
Conservative	Frederick Hampson*		1929
Conservative	Robert Hopwood*		1929
Liberal	William Hughes*		1929
Conservative	S. H. Lees*		1929
Liberal	J. P. McDougall*		1929
Conservative	William Ollier*		1929
Liberal	J. Willett*		1929

=== Aldermanic election, 16 July 1924 ===
Caused by the death on 17 June 1924 of Alderman John H. Cottrill (Conservative, elected as an alderman by the council on 3 September 1919).

In his place, Councillor W. S. Roberts (Conservative, Trinity, elected 1 November 1907) was elected as an alderman by the council on 16 July 1924.

Party	Alderman	Ward	Term expires
Conservative	W. S. Roberts		1926

== By-elections between 1923 and 1924 ==
=== Weaste, 20 November 1923 ===
Caused by the election as an alderman of Councillor Benjamin Littler (Conservative, Weaste, elected 1 November 1906) on 31 October 1923, following the death on 4 October 1923 of Alderman W. P. Burnley (Liberal, elected as an alderman by the council on 5 October 1921).

Weaste
Party	Candidate	Votes	%	±%
Labour	J. Gorman	850	37.0	N/A
Independent	H. Ashford	760	33.1	N/A
Conservative	J. Bateman	689	29.9	N/A
Majority		90	3.9	N/A
Turnout		2,299		
Labour gain from Conservative		Swing		

=== Kersal, 20 February 1924 ===
Caused by the death of Councillor James Blades (Liberal, Kersal, elected 1 November 1919) on 18 January 1924.

Kersal
Party	Candidate	Votes	%	±%
Liberal	W. Walton	820	53.7	+1.5
Conservative	H. Waterhouse	708	46.3	−1.5
Majority		112	7.4	+3.0
Turnout		1,528		
Liberal hold		Swing		

=== Trinity, 31 July 1924 ===
Caused by the election as an alderman of Councillor W. S. Roberts (Conservative, Trinity, elected 1 November 1907) on 16 July 1924, following the death on 17 June 1924 of Alderman John H. Cottrill (Conservative, elected as an alderman by the council on 3 September 1919).

Trinity
Party	Candidate	Votes	%	±%
Labour	A. E. W. Sandelson	1,367	55.1	N/A
Conservative	G. Johnson	1,112	44.9	N/A
Majority		255	10.2	N/A
Turnout		2,479		
Labour gain from Conservative		Swing		
