= 1925 Salford Borough Council election =

Local election in Salford

- 2 November 1925

16 of 64 seats on Salford County Borough Council 33 seats needed for a majority
	First party	Second party	Third party
Party	Labour	Conservative	Liberal
Last election	6 seats, 41.6%	4 seats, 31.7%	3 seats, 17.4%
Seats before	20	18	13
Seats won	9	4	2
Seats after	22	19	13
Seat change	▲2	▲1	Steady
Popular vote	27,186	19,921	2,294
Percentage	49.1%	36.0%	4.1%
Swing	▲7.5%	▲4.3%	▼13.3%
	Fourth party	Fifth party
Party	Ratepayers	Independent
Last election	2 seats, 9.2%	1 seats, 0.0%
Seats before	6	7
Seats won	1	0
Seats after	6	4
Seat change	Steady	▼3
Popular vote	1,779	4,153
Percentage	3.2%	7.5%
Swing	▼6.0%	▲7.5%
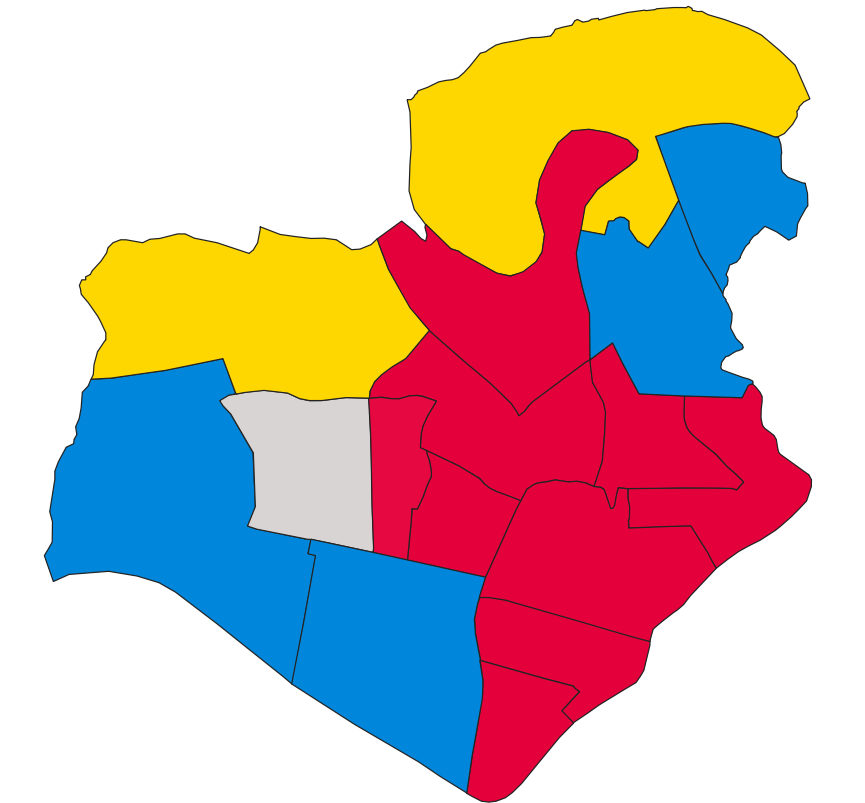
- Map of results of 1925 election
Leader of the Council before election
No overall control
Leader of the Council after election
No overall control

Elections to Salford Borough Council were held on Monday, 2 November 1925. One third of the councillors seats were up for election, with each successful candidate to serve a three-year term of office. The council remained under no overall control.

== Election result ==
Party	Votes		Seats			Full Council	
Labour Party	27,186 (49.1%)	▲7.5	9 (56.3%)	9 / 16	▲2	22 (34.4%)	22 / 64
Conservative Party	19,921 (36.0%)	▲4.3	4 (25.0%)	4 / 16	▲1	19 (29.7%)	19 / 64
Liberal Party	2,294 (4.1%)	▼13.3	2 (12.5%)	2 / 16	Steady	13 (20.3%)	13 / 64
Ratepayers	1,779 (3.2%)	▼6.0	1 (6.3%)	1 / 16	Steady	6 (9.4%)	6 / 64
Independent	4,153 (7.5%)	▲7.5	0 (0.0%)	0 / 16	▼3	4 (6.3%)	4 / 64
Independent Liberal	70 (0.1%)	N/A	0 (0.0%)	0 / 16	N/A	0 (0.0%)	0 / 64

=== Full council ===
↓
22	13	4	6	19

=== Aldermen ===
↓
1	7	8

=== Councillors ===
↓
21	6	4	6	11

== Ward results ==
=== Albert Park ===
Albert Park
Party	Candidate	Votes	%	±%
Conservative	S. Finburgh M.P.*	2,458	55.4	+18.0
Labour	H. O. Jones	1,908	43.0	N/A
Independent Liberal	M. Shloimovitz	70	1.6	N/A
Majority		550	12.4	
Turnout		4,436		
Conservative hold		Swing		

=== Charlestown ===
Charlestown
Party	Candidate	Votes	%	±%
Labour	J. F. Crane*	2,654	55.5	+5.4
Conservative	W. Crossley	2,125	44.5	N/A
Majority		529	11.0	+10.8
Turnout		4,779		
Labour hold		Swing		

=== Claremont ===
Claremont
Party	Candidate	Votes	%	±%
Liberal	R. Johnson*	2,294	75.3	−1.4
Labour	V. Hewitt	754	24.7	+1.4
Majority		1,540	50.6	−2.8
Turnout		3,048		
Liberal hold		Swing		

=== Crescent ===
Crescent
Party	Candidate	Votes	%	±%
Labour	A. Millwood*	1,985	54.1	−8.5
Conservative	A. Davies	1,684	45.9	+8.5
Majority		301	8.2	−17.0
Turnout		3,669		
Labour hold		Swing		

=== Docks ===
Docks
Party	Candidate	Votes	%	±%
Conservative	J. L. Clampitt	1,690	51.7	N/A
Labour	F. A. Luckarift*	1,581	48.3	+13.5
Majority		109	3.4	
Turnout		3,271		
Conservative gain from Labour		Swing		

=== Kersal ===
Kersal
Party	Candidate	Votes	%	±%
Liberal	W. Walton*	uncontested		
Liberal hold		Swing		

=== Langworthy ===
Langworthy
Party	Candidate	Votes	%	±%
Labour	E. Corbey*	1,906	58.0	−4.8
Conservative	H. Parr	1,380	42.0	+4.8
Majority		526	16.0	−9.6
Turnout		3,286		
Labour hold		Swing		

=== Mandley Park ===
Mandley Park
Party	Candidate	Votes	%	±%
Conservative	W. Greenwood*	2,135	52.1	−10.1
Labour	J. Park	1,962	47.9	+10.1
Majority		173	4.2	−20.2
Turnout		4,097		
Conservative hold		Swing		

=== Ordsall Park ===
Ordsall Park
Party	Candidate	Votes	%	±%
Labour	J. Lemmon	2,274	53.3	+4.5
Independent	W. H. Parkinson*	1,994	46.7	N/A
Majority		280	6.6	
Turnout		4,268		
Labour gain from Independent		Swing		

=== Regent ===
Regent
Party	Candidate	Votes	%	±%
Labour	J. Howard	2,188	52.4	+10.7
Conservative	J. T. Harrison*	1,986	47.6	N/A
Majority		202	4.8	
Turnout		4,174		
Labour gain from Conservative		Swing		

=== St. Matthias' ===
St. Matthias'
Party	Candidate	Votes	%	±%
Labour	J. W. Kay	2,118	46.8	−7.0
Conservative	F. W. Beresford	1,615	35.7	−10.5
Independent	C. Kelsey	796	17.5	N/A
Majority		503	11.1	+3.5
Turnout		4,529		
Labour gain from Independent		Swing		

=== St. Paul's ===
St. Paul's
Party	Candidate	Votes	%	±%
Labour	F. Jones	1,694	55.4	+4.8
Independent	M. Shutt*	1,363	44.6	N/A
Majority		331	10.8	+9.6
Turnout		3,057		
Labour gain from Independent		Swing		

=== St. Thomas' ===
St. Thomas'
Party	Candidate	Votes	%	±%
Labour	F. E. Monks*	1,862	52.5	+3.9
Conservative	G. Johnson	1,686	47.5	−3.9
Majority		176	5.0	
Turnout		3,548		
Labour hold		Swing		

=== Seedley ===
Seedley
Party	Candidate	Votes	%	±%
Ratepayers	P. Ashcroft*	1,779	58.5	+15.7
Labour	C. J. Townsend	1,260	41.5	+2.6
Majority		519	17.0	
Turnout		3,039		
Ratepayers hold		Swing		

=== Trinity ===
Trinity
Party	Candidate	Votes	%	±%
Labour	E. A. Hardy*	1,828	56.6	N/A
Conservative	W. F. Reeks	1,404	43.4	N/A
Majority		424	13.2	N/A
Turnout		3,232		
Labour hold		Swing		

=== Weaste ===
Weaste
Party	Candidate	Votes	%	±%
Conservative	J. Binns	1,758	59.2	−6.4
Labour	J. Gorman*	1,212	40.8	+6.4
Majority		546	18.4	−12.8
Turnout		2,970		
Conservative gain from Labour		Swing		

== By-elections between 1925 and 1926 ==
=== Trinity, 21 January 1926 ===
Caused by the resignation of Councillor Dr. A. E. W. Sandelson (Labour, Trinity, elected 31 July 1924) on 6 January 1926.

Trinity
Party	Candidate	Votes	%	±%
Independent	T. W. Richardson	1,331	54.1	N/A
Labour	J. Gorman	1,127	45.9	−10.7
Majority		204	8.2	
Turnout		2,458		
Independent gain from Labour		Swing		

=== Kersal, 25 August 1926 ===
Caused by the death of Councillor William Walton (Liberal, Kersal, elected 20 February 1924) on 20 July 1926.

Kersal
Party	Candidate	Votes	%	±%
Conservative	J. W. Weir	1,124	59.9	N/A
Labour	J. Brentnall	752	40.1	N/A
Majority		372	19.8	N/A
Turnout		1,876		
Conservative gain from Liberal		Swing		
