= 1933 Salford City Council election =

Local election in Salford

- 1 November 1933

16 of 64 seats on Salford City Council 33 seats needed for a majority
	First party	Second party	Third party
Party	Conservative	Labour	Liberal
Last election	4 seats, 35.2%	10 seats, 52.8%	0 seats, 4.3%
Seats before	34	12	10
Seats won	7	8	0
Seats after	31	19	8
Seat change	▼3	▲7	▼2
Popular vote	14,681	24,558	2,285
Percentage	31.8%	53.1%	4.9%
Swing	▼3.4%	▲0.3%	▲0.6%
	Fourth party
Party	Independent
Last election	2 seats, 7.5%
Seats before	8
Seats won	1
Seats after	6
Seat change	▼2
Popular vote	4,570
Percentage	9.9%
Swing	▲2.4%
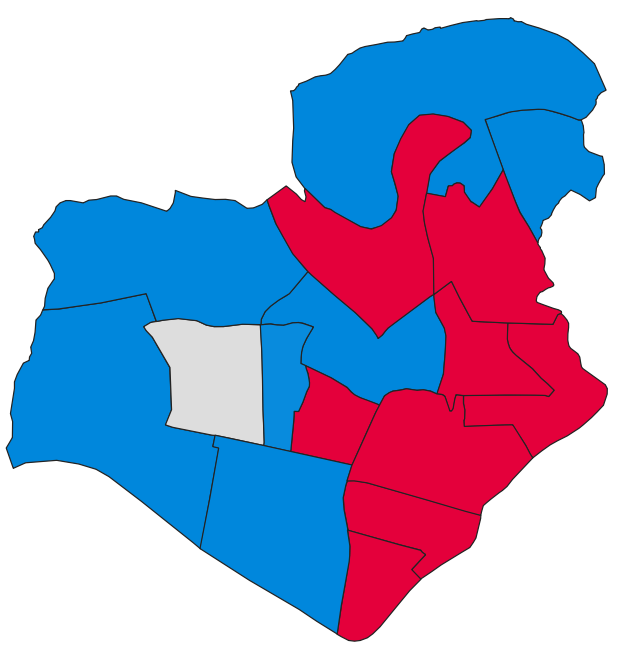
- Map of results of 1933 election
Leader of the Council before election
Conservative
Leader of the Council after election
No overall control

Elections to Salford City Council were held on Wednesday, 1 November 1933. One-third of the councillors seats were up for election, with each successful candidate to serve a three-year term of office. The Conservative Party lost overall control of the council.

== Election result ==
Party	Votes		Seats			Full Council	
Conservative Party	14,681 (31.8%)	▼3.4	7 (43.8%)	7 / 16	▼3	31 (48.4%)	31 / 64
Labour Party	24,558 (53.1%)	▲0.3	8 (50.0%)	8 / 16	▲7	19 (29.7%)	19 / 64
Liberal Party	2,285 (4.9%)	▲0.6	0 (0.0%)	0 / 16	▼2	8 (12.5%)	8 / 64
Independent	4,570 (9.9%)	▲2.4	1 (6.3%)	1 / 16	▼2	6 (9.4%)	6 / 64
Communist	123 (0.3%)	▲0.1	0 (0.0%)	0 / 16	Steady	0 (0.0%)	0 / 64

=== Full council ===
↓
19	8	6	31

=== Aldermen ===
↓
8	1	7

=== Councillors ===
↓
19	5	24

== Ward results ==
=== Albert Park ===
Albert Park
Party	Candidate	Votes	%	±%
Labour	A. Atherton	1,750	55.6	+10.6
Liberal	E. Dulberg*	1,395	44.4	N/A
Majority		355	11.2	
Turnout		3,145		
Labour gain from Liberal		Swing		

=== Charlestown ===
Charlestown
Party	Candidate	Votes	%	±%
Labour	J. Brentnall	2,430	62.6	+4.2
Independent	T. H. Nightingale*	1,453	37.4	N/A
Majority		977	25.2	+6.6
Turnout		3,883		
Labour gain from Independent		Swing		

=== Claremont ===
Claremont
Party	Candidate	Votes	%	±%
Conservative	G. Fearnehough*	1,569	70.1	N/A
Labour	J. S. Hooton	669	29.9	+3.6
Majority		900	40.2	
Turnout		2,238		
Conservative hold		Swing		

=== Crescent ===
Crescent
Party	Candidate	Votes	%	±%
Labour	J. A. Brewin	1,803	55.5	−3.0
Conservative	J. Briggs*	1,444	44.5	+3.0
Majority		359	11.0	−6.0
Turnout		3,247		
Labour gain from Conservative		Swing		

=== Docks ===
Docks
Party	Candidate	Votes	%	±%
Conservative	J. T. Harrison*	1,530	50.6	−0.8
Labour	W. Harvey	1,495	49.4	+0.8
Majority		35	1.2	−1.6
Turnout		3,025		
Conservative hold		Swing		

=== Kersal ===
Kersal
Party	Candidate	Votes	%	±%
Conservative	W. Crookell*	uncontested		
Conservative hold		Swing		

=== Langworthy ===
Langworthy
Party	Candidate	Votes	%	±%
Conservative	T. W. Buck*	1,505	51.4	+5.3
Labour	J. Lemmon	1,423	48.6	−5.3
Majority		82	2.8	
Turnout		2,928		
Conservative hold		Swing		

=== Mandley Park ===
Mandley Park
Party	Candidate	Votes	%	±%
Conservative	W. Armstrong*	1,541	50.8	+8.4
Labour	H. Ingle	1,491	49.2	−8.4
Majority		50	1.6	
Turnout		3,032		
Conservative hold		Swing		

=== Ordsall Park ===
Ordsall Park
Party	Candidate	Votes	%	±%
Labour	G. W. Sands	2,383	69.2	+2.3
Conservative	D. Morgan	1,059	30.8	−2.3
Majority		1,324	38.4	+4.6
Turnout		3,442		
Labour gain from Conservative		Swing		

=== Regent ===
Regent
Party	Candidate	Votes	%	±%
Labour	B. Boughton*	2,232	61.4	−3.2
Conservative	W. Leicester	1,351	37.1	+1.7
Communist	F. Broadhurst	54	1.5	N/A
Majority		881	24.3	−4.9
Turnout		3,637		
Labour hold		Swing		

=== St. Matthias' ===
St. Matthias'
Party	Candidate	Votes	%	±%
Labour	F. Cowin	2,101	54.6	N/A
Independent	T. William Richardson*	1,678	43.6	N/A
Communist	R. Davies	69	1.8	N/A
Majority		423	11.0	N/A
Turnout		3,848		
Labour gain from Independent		Swing		

=== St. Paul's ===
St. Paul's
Party	Candidate	Votes	%	±%
Labour	V. A. Darley	1,465	62.2	+5.5
Liberal	D. Worrall*	890	37.8	+29.5
Majority		575	24.4	+2.7
Turnout		2,355		
Labour gain from Liberal		Swing		

=== St. Thomas' ===
St. Thomas'
Party	Candidate	Votes	%	±%
Conservative	G. W. Smith*	1,618	52.1	+4.1
Labour	J. H. Kearns	1,490	47.9	−4.1
Majority		128	4.2	
Turnout		3,108		
Conservative hold		Swing		

=== Seedley ===
Seedley
Party	Candidate	Votes	%	±%
Independent	C. J. Townsend*	1,439	57.2	−7.6
Labour	W. Greenwood	1,075	42.8	+7.6
Majority		364	14.4	−15.2
Turnout		2,514		
Independent hold		Swing		

=== Trinity ===
Trinity
Party	Candidate	Votes	%	±%
Labour	J. Shlosberg	1,757	56.7	−2.9
Conservative	F. T. B. Luckman*	1,342	43.3	+2.9
Majority		415	13.4	−5.8
Turnout		3,099		
Labour gain from Conservative		Swing		

=== Weaste ===
Weaste
Party	Candidate	Votes	%	±%
Conservative	J. F. Emery*	1,722	63.4	−2.9
Labour	I. Copson	994	36.6	+2.9
Majority		728	26.8	−5.8
Turnout		2,716		
Conservative hold		Swing		

== Aldermanic elections ==
=== Aldermanic elections, 4 April 1934 ===
Caused by the resignation on 16 February 1934 of Alderman George Barker (Liberal, elected as an alderman by the council on 6 June 1917).

In his place, Councillor James Frederick Emery (Conservative, Weaste, elected 1 November 1921) was elected as an alderman by the council on 4 April 1934.

Party	Alderman	Ward	Term expires
Conservative	James Frederick Emery		1935

=== Aldermanic elections, 4 July 1934 ===
Caused by the death on 18 June 1934 of Alderman Joseph Connolly (Liberal, elected as an alderman by the council on 1 February 1933).

In his place, Councillor William Armstrong (Conservative, Mandley Park, elected 1 November 1921) was elected as an alderman by the council on 4 July 1934.

Party	Alderman	Ward	Term expires
Conservative	William Armstrong		1935

== By-elections between 1933 and 1934 ==
=== Docks, 27 March 1934 ===
Caused by the death of Councillor James Lamb Clampitt (Conservative, Docks, elected 2 November 1925) on 12 February 1934.

Docks
Party	Candidate	Votes	%	±%
Labour	W. Crosby	968	50.6	+1.2
Conservative	D. Morgan	946	49.4	−1.2
Majority		22	1.2	
Turnout		1,914		
Labour gain from Conservative		Swing		

=== Weaste, 19 April 1934 ===
Caused by the election as an alderman of Councillor James Frederick Emery (Conservative, Weaste, elected 1 November 1921) on 4 April 1934, following the resignation on 16 February 1934 of Alderman George Barker (Liberal, elected as an alderman by the council on 6 June 1917).

Weaste
Party	Candidate	Votes	%	±%
Conservative	S. Daber	1,348	60.0	−3.4
Labour	J. Openshaw	897	40.0	+3.4
Majority		451	20.0	−6.8
Turnout		2,245		
Conservative hold		Swing		

=== Mandley Park, 2 August 1934 ===
Caused by the election as an alderman of Councillor William Armstrong (Conservative, Mandley Park, elected 1 November 1921) on 4 July 1934, following the death on 18 June 1934 of Alderman Joseph Connolly (Liberal, elected as an alderman by the council on 1 February 1933).

Mandley Park
Party	Candidate	Votes	%	±%
Labour	W. Crabtree	1,233	57.5	+8.3
Conservative	F. Gatrell	910	42.5	−8.3
Majority		323	15.0	
Turnout		2,143		
Labour gain from Conservative		Swing		
