= 1926 Salford City Council election =

Local election in Salford

- 1 November 1926

16 of 64 seats on Salford City Council 33 seats needed for a majority
	First party	Second party	Third party
Party	Labour	Conservative	Liberal
Last election	9 seats, 49.1%	4 seats, 36.0%	2 seats, 4.1%
Seats before	22	19	12
Seats won	7	2	2
Seats after	23	20	12
Seat change	▲1	▲1	Steady
Popular vote	25,208	12,162	2,001
Percentage	47.9%	23.1%	3.8%
Swing	▼1.2%	▼12.9%	▼0.3%
	Fourth party	Fifth party
Party	Ratepayers	Independent
Last election	1 seats, 3.2%	0 seats, 7.5%
Seats before	6	5
Seats won	2	3
Seats after	5	4
Seat change	▼1	▼1
Popular vote	5,626	7,612
Percentage	10.7%	14.5%
Swing	▲7.5%	▲7.0%
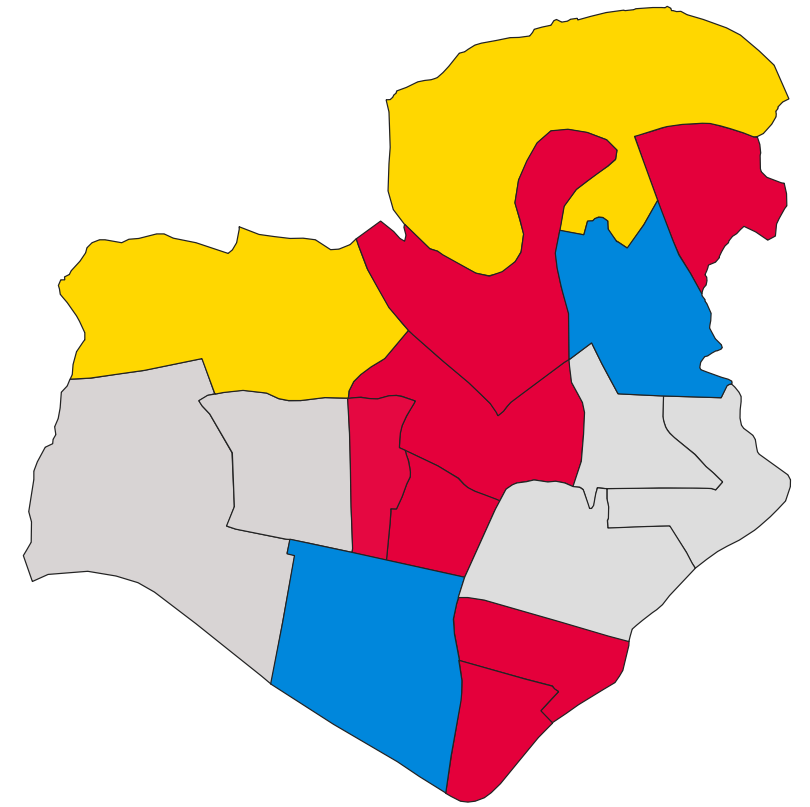
- Map of results of 1926 election
Leader of the Council before election
No overall control
Leader of the Council after election
No overall control

Elections to Salford City Council were held on Monday, 1 November 1926. One third of the councillors seats were up for election, with each successful candidate to serve a three-year term of office. The council remained under no overall control.

== Election result ==
Party	Votes		Seats			Full Council	
Labour Party	25,208 (47.9%)	▼1.2	8 (43.8%)	8 / 16	▲1	23 (35.9%)	23 / 64
Conservative Party	12,162 (23.1%)	▼12.9	2 (12.5%)	2 / 16	▲1	20 (31.3%)	20 / 64
Liberal Party	2,001 (3.8%)	▼0.3	2 (12.5%)	2 / 16	Steady	12 (18.8%)	12 / 64
Ratepayers	5,626 (10.7%)	▲7.5	2 (12.5%)	2 / 16	▼1	5 (7.8%)	5 / 64
Independent	7,612 (14.5%)	▲7.0	3 (18.8%)	3 / 16	▼1	4 (6.3%)	4 / 64

=== Full council ===
↓
23	12	4	5	20

=== Aldermen ===
↓
1	7	8

=== Councillors ===
↓
22	5	4	5	12

== Ward results ==
=== Albert Park ===
Albert Park
Party	Candidate	Votes	%	±%
Conservative	A. Richardson	2,025	50.1	−5.3
Labour	A. Atherton*	1,821	45.0	+2.0
Liberal	M. Shloimovitz	199	4.9	N/A
Majority		204	5.1	−7.3
Turnout		4,045		
Conservative gain from Labour		Swing		

=== Charlestown ===
Charlestown
Party	Candidate	Votes	%	±%
Labour	G. Howard*	2,763	58.6	+3.1
Conservative	J. Cotton	1,955	41.4	−3.1
Majority		808	17.2	+6.2
Turnout		4,718		
Labour hold		Swing		

=== Claremont ===
Claremont
Party	Candidate	Votes	%	±%
Liberal	A. H. Collins*	uncontested		
Liberal hold		Swing		

=== Crescent ===
Crescent
Party	Candidate	Votes	%	±%
Independent	J. Higginbottom*	2,114	52.7	N/A
Labour	A. Worthington	1,894	47.3	−6.8
Majority		220	5.4	
Turnout		4,008		
Independent hold		Swing		

=== Docks ===
Docks
Party	Candidate	Votes	%	±%
Conservative	R. Whitfield	1,449	51.2	−0.5
Labour	G. W. Sands*	1,379	48.8	+0.5
Majority		70	2.4	−1.0
Turnout		2,828		
Conservative gain from Labour		Swing		

=== Kersal ===
Kersal
Party	Candidate	Votes	%	±%
Liberal	J. Jackson*	1,802	74.2	N/A
Labour	J. Brentnall	627	25.8	N/A
Majority		1,175	48.4	N/A
Turnout		2,429		
Liberal hold		Swing		

=== Langworthy ===
Langworthy
Party	Candidate	Votes	%	±%
Labour	E. E. Dale*	1,639	52.1	−5.9
Conservative	T. Nuttall	1,509	47.9	+5.9
Majority		130	4.2	−11.8
Turnout		3,148		
Labour hold		Swing		

=== Mandley Park ===
Mandley Park
Party	Candidate	Votes	%	±%
Labour	J. Park	2,011	51.1	+3.2
Ratepayers	G. Brown*	1,923	48.9	N/A
Majority		88	2.2	
Turnout		3,934		
Labour gain from Ratepayers		Swing		

=== Ordsall Park ===
Ordsall Park
Party	Candidate	Votes	%	±%
Labour	T. Walsh*	2,307	58.7	+5.4
Conservative	T. Catterall	1,625	41.3	N/A
Majority		682	17.4	+10.8
Turnout		3,932		
Labour hold		Swing		

=== Regent ===
Regent
Party	Candidate	Votes	%	±%
Labour	A. Moss	1,946	50.1	−2.3
Conservative	A. Worthington*	1,939	49.9	+2.3
Majority		7	0.2	−4.6
Turnout		3,885		
Labour gain from Conservative		Swing		

=== St. Matthias' ===
St. Matthias'
Party	Candidate	Votes	%	±%
Independent	M. Moylan*	2,367	55.7	+38.2
Labour	J. T. Tattersall	1,885	44.3	−2.5
Majority		482	11.4	
Turnout		4,252		
Independent hold		Swing		

=== St. Paul's ===
St. Paul's
Party	Candidate	Votes	%	±%
Labour	L. Webb	1,707	52.7	−2.7
Independent	O. O. W. Simpson*	1,534	47.3	+2.7
Majority		173	5.4	−5.4
Turnout		3,241		
Labour gain from Independent		Swing		

=== St. Thomas' ===
St. Thomas'
Party	Candidate	Votes	%	±%
Labour	J. W. Bloom*	1,841	52.6	+0.1
Conservative	A. Hestford	1,660	47.4	−0.1
Majority		181	5.1	+0.2
Turnout		3,501		
Labour hold		Swing		

=== Seedley ===
Seedley
Party	Candidate	Votes	%	±%
Ratepayers	W. F. Cuttiford*	2,074	69.6	+11.1
Labour	I. Copson	907	30.4	−11.1
Majority		1,167	39.2	+22.2
Turnout		2,981		
Ratepayers hold		Swing		

=== Trinity ===
Trinity
Party	Candidate	Votes	%	±%
Independent	T. William Richardson*	1,597	53.9	N/A
Labour	T. H. Richardson	1,365	46.1	−10.5
Majority		232	7.8	
Turnout		2,962		
Independent hold		Swing		

=== Weaste ===
Weaste
Party	Candidate	Votes	%	±%
Ratepayers	H. W. Starkey*	1,629	59.3	N/A
Labour	J. Gorman	1,116	40.7	−0.1
Majority		513	18.6	
Turnout		2,745		
Ratepayers hold		Swing		

== Aldermanic elections ==
=== Aldermanic elections, 9 November 1926 ===
At the meeting of the council on 9 November 1926, the terms of office of eight aldermen expired.

The following eight were elected as aldermen by the council on 9 November 1926 for a term of six years.

Party	Alderman	Ward	Term expires
Conservative	George Billington*		1932
Liberal	Ernest Desquesnes*		1932
Conservative	S. H. Kettle*	Docks	1932
Conservative	Benjamin Littler*		1932
Liberal	F. S. Phillips*		1932
Conservative	W. S. Roberts*		1932
Liberal	John Rothwell*		1932
Conservative	Abraham Williamson*	St. Paul's	1932

=== Aldermanic election, 4 May 1927 ===
Caused by the death on 25 April 1927 of Alderman S. H. Kettle (Conservative, elected as an alderman by the council on 2 August 1922).

In his place, Councillor John Bratherton (Conservative, Ordsall Park, elected 1 November 1911) was elected as an alderman by the council on 4 May 1927.

Party	Alderman	Ward	Term expires
Conservative	John Bratherton	Docks	1932

=== Aldermanic election, 5 October 1927 ===
Caused by the death on 23 September 1927 of Alderman J. P. McDougall (Liberal, elected as an alderman by the council on 3 May 1922).

In his place, Councillor William Greenwood (Conservative, Mandley Park, elected 1 November 1912) was elected as an alderman by the council on 5 October 1927.

Party	Alderman	Ward	Term expires
Conservative	William Greenwood	Crescent	1929

== By-elections between 1926 and 1927 ==
=== Albert Park, 25 January 1927 ===
Caused by the disqualification of Councillor Alfred Richardson (Conservative, Albert Park, elected 1 November 1926) on 5 January 1927.

Albert Park
Party	Candidate	Votes	%	±%
Conservative	A. Richardson*	1,809	53.2	+3.1
Labour	A. Atherton	1,592	46.8	+1.8
Majority		217	6.4	+1.3
Turnout		3,401		
Conservative hold		Swing		

=== Ordsall Park, 19 May 1927 ===
Caused by the election as an alderman of Councillor John Bratherton (Conservative, Ordsall Park, elected 1 November 1911) on 4 May 1927, following the death on 25 April 1927 of Alderman S. H. Kettle (Conservative, elected as an alderman by the council on 2 August 1922).

Ordsall Park
Party	Candidate	Votes	%	±%
Labour	G. W. Sands	1,730	56.6	−2.1
Conservative	W. Salisbury	1,326	43.4	+2.1
Majority		404	13.2	−4.2
Turnout		3,066		
Labour gain from Conservative		Swing		

=== Mandley Park, 19 October 1927 ===
Caused by the election as an alderman of Councillor William Greenwood (Conservative, Mandley Park, elected 1 November 1912) on 5 October 1927, following the death on 23 September 1927 of Alderman J. P. McDougall (Liberal, elected as an alderman by the council on 3 May 1922).

Mandley Park
Party	Candidate	Votes	%	±%
Labour	J. Brentnall	1,785	51.9	+0.8
Conservative	G. Fearnehough	1,655	48.1	N/A
Majority		130	3.8	+1.6
Turnout		3,440		
Labour gain from Conservative		Swing		
