= 1919 Salford Borough Council election =

Local election in Salford

← 1914	1 November 1919	1920 →

16 of 64 seats on Salford County Borough Council 33 seats needed for a majority
	First party	Second party	Third party
Party	Conservative	Liberal	Labour
Seats before	37	22	5
Seats won	5	3	8
Seats after	30	23	11
Seat change	▼7	▲1	▲6
Popular vote	7,182	6,904	8,114
Percentage	28.4%	27.3%	32.0%
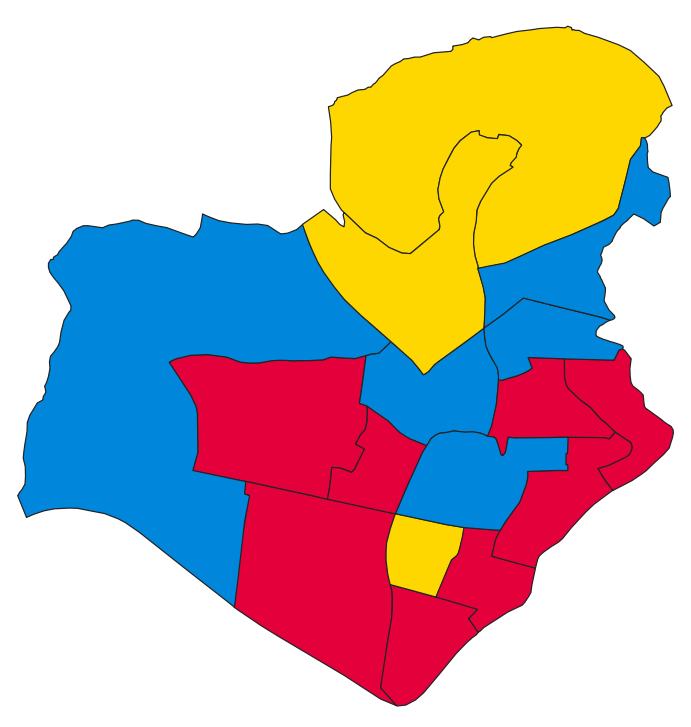
- Map of results of 1919 election
Leader of the Council before election
Conservative
Leader of the Council after election
No overall control

Elections to Salford Borough Council were held on Saturday, 1 November 1919. One third of the councillors seats were up for election, with each successful candidate to serve a three-year term of office. The Conservative Party lost overall control of the council. These were the first local elections held in Salford since the outbreak of the First World War.

== Election result ==
Party	Votes	Seats			Full Council	
Conservative Party	7,182 (28.4%)	5 (31.3%)	5 / 16	▼7	30 (46.9%)	30 / 64
Liberal Party	6,904 (27.3%)	3 (18.8%)	3 / 16	▲1	23 (35.9%)	23 / 64
Labour Party	8,114 (32.0%)	8 (50.0%)	8 / 16	▲6	11 (17.2%)	11 / 64
Independent	2,154 (8.5%)	0 (0.0%)	0 / 16	Steady	0 (0.0%)	0 / 64
Co-operative Party	972 (3.8%)	0 (0.0%)	0 / 16	Steady	1 (0.0%)	0 / 64

=== Full council ===
↓
11	23	30

=== Aldermen ===
↓
7	9

=== Councillors ===
↓
11	16	21

== Ward results ==
=== Albert Park ===
Albert Park
Party	Candidate	Votes	%	±%
Conservative	W. Greenwood*	uncontested		
Conservative hold		Swing		

=== Charlestown ===
Charlestown
Party	Candidate	Votes	%	±%
Liberal	F. Gregory*	1,300	57.2	
Co-operative Party	F. D. Holt	972	42.8	
Majority		328	14.4	
Turnout		2,272	56.9	
Liberal hold		Swing		

=== Crescent ===
Crescent
Party	Candidate	Votes	%	±%
Conservative	G. Billington*	1,219	63.9	
Independent	E. Sheeran	690	36.1	
Majority		529	27.8	
Turnout		1,909	48.3	
Conservative hold		Swing		

=== Grosvenor ===
Grosvenor
Party	Candidate	Votes	%	±%
Conservative	S. Finburgh*	1,229	57.1	
Liberal	J. O'Donnell	924	42.9	
Majority		305	14.2	
Turnout		2,153	46.6	
Conservative hold		Swing		

=== Hope ===
Hope
Party	Candidate	Votes	%	±%
Conservative	B. Littler*	uncontested		
Conservative hold		Swing		

=== Islington ===
Islington
Party	Candidate	Votes	%	±%
Labour	J. F. Crane	864	54.9	
Conservative	J. C. Watson	710	45.1	
Majority		154	9.8	
Turnout		1,574	53.3	
Labour gain from Conservative		Swing		

=== Kersal ===
Kersal
Party	Candidate	Votes	%	±%
Liberal	J. Blades	2,288	69.6	
Conservative	A. A. Benjamin	531	16.2	
Independent	J. Brentnall	467	14.2	
Majority		1,757	53.4	
Turnout		3,286	46.8	
Liberal gain from Conservative		Swing		

=== Ordsall ===
Ordsall
Party	Candidate	Votes	%	±%
Labour	J. W. Beatty	909	61.3	
Conservative	J. Baker*	573	38.7	
Majority		336	22.6	
Turnout		1,482	29.6	
Labour gain from Conservative		Swing		

=== Regent ===
Regent
Party	Candidate	Votes	%	±%
Liberal	A. E. Hunt	965	46.0	
Conservative	F. Guildford	741	35.3	
Labour	P. Moulson	392	18.7	
Majority		224	10.7	
Turnout		2,098	51.0	
Liberal gain from Conservative		Swing		

=== St. Matthias' ===
St. Matthias'
Party	Candidate	Votes	%	±%
Labour	S. Farrow	1,168	68.4	
Conservative	J. Maguire	540	31.6	
Majority		628	36.8	
Turnout		1,708	42.5	
Labour gain from Conservative		Swing		

=== St. Paul's ===
St. Paul's
Party	Candidate	Votes	%	±%
Labour	W. Owen	1,329	50.7	
Independent	J. Higginbottom	899	34.3	
Conservative	J. Royle*	394	15.0	
Majority		430	16.4	
Turnout		2,622	60.2	
Labour gain from Conservative		Swing		

=== St. Thomas' ===
St. Thomas'
Party	Candidate	Votes	%	±%
Conservative	G. Johnson*	679	52.6	
Labour	J. W. Bloom	611	47.4	
Majority		68	5.2	
Turnout		1,290	34.0	
Conservative hold		Swing		

=== Seedley ===
Seedley
Party	Candidate	Votes	%	±%
Labour	E. Corbey	2,209	60.8	
Liberal	J. P. McDougall*	1,427	39.2	
Majority		782	21.6	
Turnout		3,636	39.5	
Labour gain from Liberal		Swing		

=== Trafford ===
Trafford
Party	Candidate	Votes	%	±%
Labour	A. Ward*	uncontested		
Labour hold		Swing		

=== Trinity ===
Trinity
Party	Candidate	Votes	%	±%
Labour	T. B. Brandon	632	48.8	
Conservative	J. F. Whittle*	566	43.7	
Independent	T. Quinn	98	7.5	
Majority		66	5.1	
Turnout		1,296	48.3	
Labour gain from Conservative		Swing		

=== Weaste ===
Weaste
Party	Candidate	Votes	%	±%
Labour	F. A. Luckarift*	uncontested		
Labour hold		Swing		

== Aldermanic elections ==
=== Aldermanic election, 1 September 1920 ===
Caused by the death on 14 August 1920 of Alderman Samuel Rudman (Conservative, elected as an alderman by the council on 9 November 1895).

In his place, Councillor Anthony Hailwood (Liberal, Albert Park, elected 1 November 1904; previously 1897-1901) was elected as an alderman by the council on 1 September 1920.

Party	Alderman	Ward	Term expires
Liberal	Anthony Hailwood		1923
