= Stan Orme =

British politician (1923-2005)

The Right Honourable The Lord Orme PC
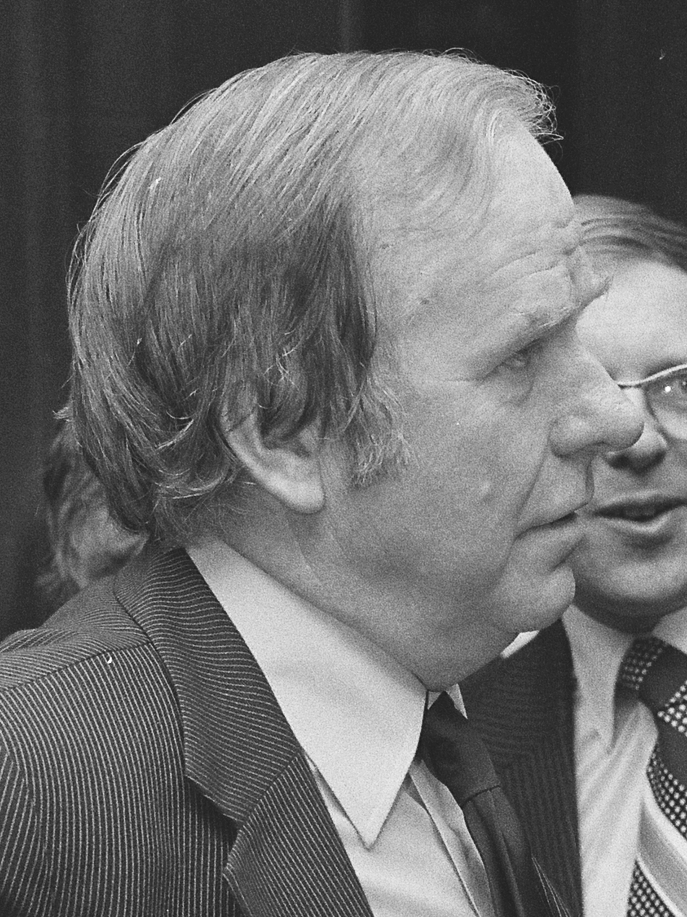
- Orme in 1978

Chair of the Parliamentary Labour Party
- In office 13 July 1987 – 18 July 1992
- Preceded by: Jack Dormand
- Succeeded by: Doug Hoyle

Shadow Secretary of State for Energy
- In office 2 October 1983 – 13 July 1987
- Leader: Neil Kinnock
- Preceded by: John Smith
- Succeeded by: John Prescott

Shadow Secretary of State for Industry
- In office 4 November 1980 – 2 October 1983
- Leader: Michael Foot
- Preceded by: John Silkin
- Succeeded by: Peter Shore

Shadow Secretary of State for Health and Social Services
- In office 14 June 1979 – 4 November 1980
- Leader: James Callaghan
- Preceded by: David Ennals
- Succeeded by: Gwyneth Dunwoody

Minister of State for Social Security
- In office 5 April 1976 – 4 May 1979
- Prime Minister: James Callaghan
- Preceded by: Brian O'Malley
- Succeeded by: Reg Prentice

Member of Parliament for Salford East
- In office 9 June 1983 – 8 April 1997
- Preceded by: Frank Allaun
- Succeeded by: Constituency Abolished

Member of Parliament for Salford West
- In office 15 October 1964 – 13 May 1983
- Preceded by: Charles Royle
- Succeeded by: Constituency Abolished

Member of the House of Lords
- Lord Temporal
- Life peerage 21 October 1997 – 28 April 2005

Personal details
- Born: 5 April 1923 Sale, Cheshire, England
- Died: 27 April 2005 (aged 82) Sale, Greater Manchester, England
- Party: Labour
- Spouse: Irene Harris (m. 1951)

Stanley Orme, Baron Orme, PC (5 April 1923 – 27 April 2005) was a British left-wing Labour Party politician. He was a Member of Parliament (MP) from 1964 to 1997, and served as a cabinet minister in the 1970s.

== Early life ==
Stan Orme was born in Sale, Cheshire. He was educated at a technical school, which he left in 1938 to become an instrument maker's apprentice. He joined the RAF in 1942, becoming a bomber-navigator, serving in Canada and Egypt. He was demobilised in 1947 as a warrant officer.

== Political career ==
Orme joined the Labour Party in 1944 and he became a Sale Borough Councillor in 1958. Firmly aligned with the left faction of Labour, led intellectually and organisationally by Aneurin Bevan, at this time, he embraced many left-wing causes, including the Movement for Colonial Freedom and the Campaign for Nuclear Disarmament.

He first stood for Parliament in Stockport South at the 1959 general election, when he lost to the incumbent Member of Parliament (MP), Conservative candidate Harold M. Steward. He was elected as MP for Salford West at the 1964 general election.

When Labour returned to office at the February 1974 general election, Orme was installed at Stormont as Minister of State for Northern Ireland. He made an impression in this role, before moving to the Department of Health and Social Security in March 1976. The Prime Minister James Callaghan promoted him to the Cabinet in September 1976 to sit alongside his departmental boss David Ennals. He remained in this role until 1979.

Orme joined the Shadow cabinet in 1979 as chief health and social security spokesman, before later moving on to hold the Industry and Energy portfolios until 1987. Following constituency boundary changes for the 1983 general election, he was elected for the redrawn seat of Salford East.

He served as the Chairman of the Parliamentary Labour Party from 1987 to 1992. He retired from the House of Commons at the 1997 general election, and he was created a life peer as Baron Orme, of Salford in the County of Greater Manchester on 21 October 1997.

Orme was a republican. He made several unsuccessful attempts to be elected to Labour's National Executive Committee, without breaking through.

Lord Orme died 22 days after his birthday, on 27 April 2005. His funeral at Dunham Crematorium was attended by many family, friends and political colleagues. A memorial service was held in the House of Lords, with speeches from former Labour leaders Neil Kinnock and Michael Foot. A very rare exception was made by the Lord Chancellor such that any Divisions were suspended during this evening service.

== Private life ==
In 1951 he married Irene Mary Harris (died 2022). They had no children.

== Controversy ==
In December 2019, a Daily Telegraph investigation reported that Orme had been involved in handing confidential information to Czech communist spies.

Parliament of the United Kingdom
Preceded by Charles Royle	Member of Parliament for Salford West; 1964–1983	Constituency abolished
Preceded by Frank Allaun	Member of Parliament for Salford East; 1983–1997	Constituency abolished
Political offices
Preceded by Brian O'Malley	Minister of State for Social Security; 1976–1979	Succeeded by Reg Prentice
Party political offices
Preceded by Jack Dormand	Chair of the Parliamentary Labour Party; 1987–1992	Succeeded by Doug Hoyle
