= William Agnew (Royal Navy officer) =

Royal Navy Vice Admiral (1898–1960)

Vice-Admiral Sir William Agnew KCVO CB DSO*
- Rear Admiral Agnew in July 1948.
- Born: 2 December 1898; London, England
- Died: 12 July 1960 (aged 61); Alverstoke, England
- Relatives: Charles Morland Agnew (father)
- Military career
- Allegiance: United Kingdom
- Branch: Royal Navy
- Service years: 1911–1950
- Rank: Vice-Admiral
- Commands: HMS Vanguard (1945–47); HMS Excellent (1944–45); HMS Dido (1943); 12th Cruiser Squadron (1943); HMS Aurora (1940–43); Force K (1941); HMS Corfu (1939–40); HMS Pegasus (1938–39); HMS Deptford (1937–38)
- Conflicts: First World War; Second World War: Norwegian campaign; Operation Gauntlet; Battle of the Duisburg Convoy; Operation Torch; Allied invasion of Sicily; Allied invasion of Italy
- Awards: Knight Commander of the Royal Victorian Order; Companion of the Order of the Bath; Companion of the Distinguished Service Order & Bar; Order of Orange-Nassau (Netherlands)

Vice-Admiral Sir William Gladstone Agnew KCVO CB DSO* (2 December 1898 – 12 July 1960) was an officer of the Royal Navy. He served during the First and Second World Wars, and rose to the rank of vice-admiral.

Agnew was the fifth son of Charles Morland Agnew and Evelyn Mary Agnew, née Naylor. Agnew was educated at Royal Naval College, Osborne, and at Britannia Royal Naval College, Dartmouth, joining the Navy in 1911. During the First World War he served aboard the battleships HMS Glory and HMS Royal Oak, as well as the destroyer HMS Skilful. During the inter war years Agnew served aboard HMS Durban and as gunnery officer aboard HMS Queen Elizabeth.

In October 1940 he was transferred to the cruiser HMS Aurora as commanding officer. His command was moved to the Mediterranean in 1941 and together with HMS Penelope and destroyers HMS Lance and HMS Lively formed Force K based in Malta. Commodore Agnew commanded Force K during the destruction of the Duisburg convoy on 8 November 1941 and was appointed a Companion of the Order of the Bath for this action. In June 1943 the Aurora was used to convey King George VI to Malta and Agnew was created a Commander of the Royal Victorian Order for this service.

Agnew was given command of HMS Excellent, the Royal Navy's gunnery school in 1943. In 1946 he was given command of HMS Vanguard, remained aboard her after his promotion to rear-admiral in January 1947, and was in command during the royal tour of South Africa. On conclusion of the tour he was appointed Knight Commander of the Royal Victorian Order in August 1947 Agnew was appointed director of personnel services at the Admiralty, where he remained until October 1949. In January 1950 he retired from the navy at his own request, and later in the year was promoted to vice-admiral on the retired list.

After retirement from the navy he was General Secretary of the National Playing Fields Association, from 1950 to 1953, and was also active in local government.

Agnew married Patricia Caroline Bewley in 1930. They had no children. At the time of his death he was living at Glentimon, Palmerston Way, Alverstoke, Hampshire.
