= Sir George Agnew, 2nd Baronet =

British art dealer, publisher and Liberal politician

Sir George Agnew, 2nd Baronet JP
- Agnew in 1916

Personal details
- Born: 19 January 1852
- Died: 19 December 1941 (aged 89) Thurston, Suffolk
- Parent(s): Sir William Agnew, 1st Baronet; Mary Kenworthy

Sir George William Agnew, 2nd Baronet, JP (19 January 1852 – 19 December 1941), was a British art dealer, publisher and Liberal politician.

== Early life ==
He was the eldest son of Sir William Agnew, 1st Baronet and his wife, Mary (née Kenworthy). The Agnew family had been prominent in the municipal life of Salford for generations. He was educated at Rugby School from 1865 to 1870 and St John's College, Cambridge, receiving Bachelor of Arts degree in 1874 and Master of Arts in 1877. While at St John's, Agnew played rugby for Cambridge University and played in the very first Varsity Match. Although Oxford won the first encounter, Agnew was part of the Cambridge team that won the second and drew the third match, making him a three time sporting 'Blue'. His brothers, Charles and William, also played for Cambridge University; Charles winning two sporting caps and William three.

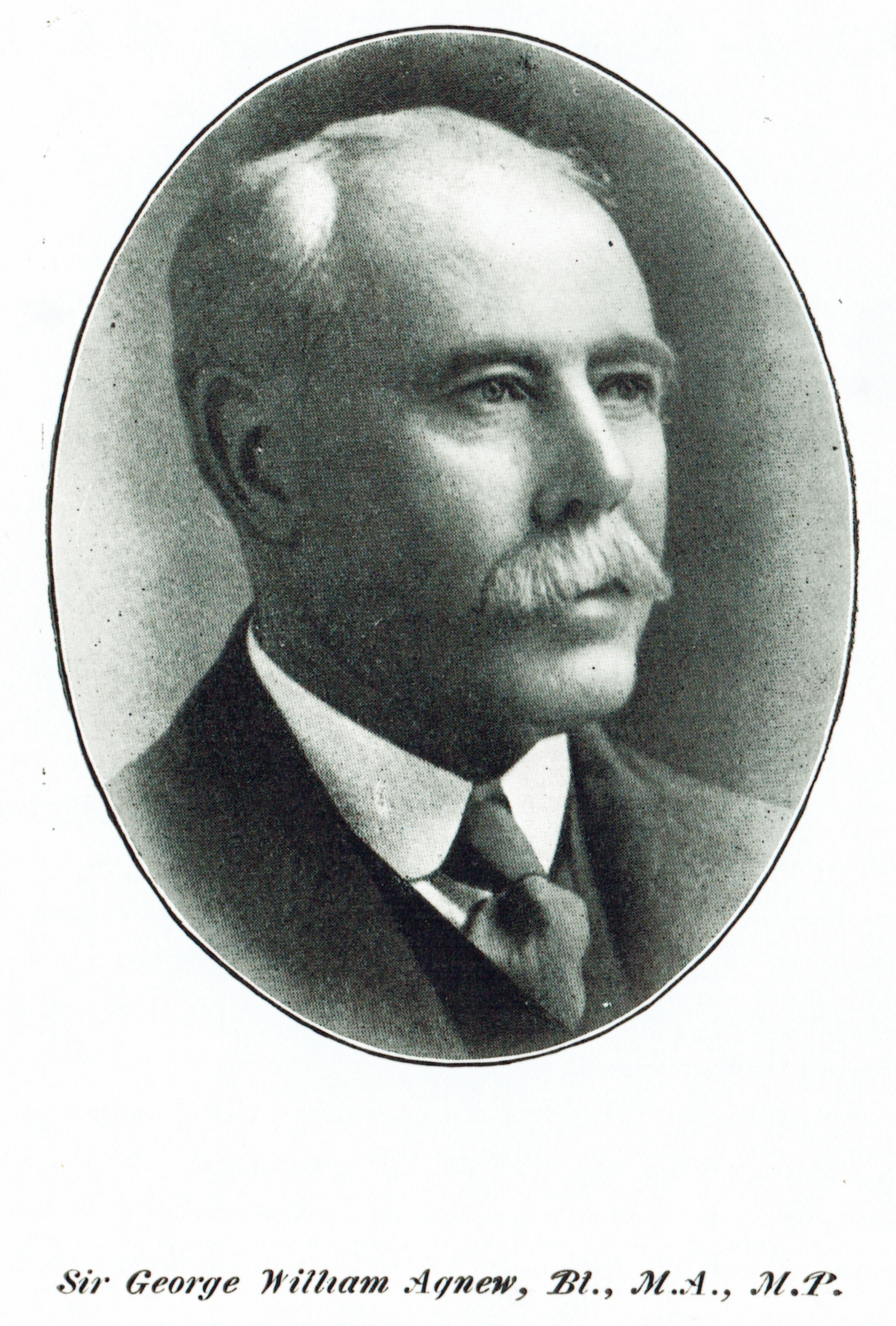
Sir George Agnew, about 1911

He was a partner in the firm of Thomas Agnew & Sons, art publishers and a member of the firm of Bradbury, Agnew & Sons, proprietors of the satirical magazine Punch. He was well known as an expert in art sales and appreciation and in 1877 he was Honorary Secretary to the Manchester Jubilee Fine Arts Committee. He was also a governor of Manchester Victoria University and of the Royal Manchester Children's Hospital in Pendlebury. He married Fanny Bolton, daughter of John Stuart Bolton, on 2 October 1878, and they had two sons and five daughters.

== Politics ==
At the 1906 general election Agnew was elected as Liberal Member of Parliament for Salford West, unseating the incumbent Conservative Lees Knowles. He held the seat at the next two elections, before retiring from parliament in 1918.

== Baronetcy ==
His father had been created Baronet Agnew, of Great Stanhope Street, in 1895. On his death on 31 October 1910, George succeeded as 2nd Baronet. He retired from the family firm at the same time.

== Later life ==
The family moved to Rougham Hall, near Bury St Edmunds, Suffolk. Sir George was High Sheriff of Suffolk in 1922. He was commissioned Major in the 2nd Battalion, Suffolk Volunteer Regiment in September 1916 and was promoted Honorary Lieutenant-Colonel in 1918.

He died at Thurston Grange, Suffolk, in December 1941 aged 89.

== Notes ==
Parliament of the United Kingdom
Preceded by Lees Knowles	Member of Parliament for Salford West; 1906–1918	Succeeded by Frederick Wolfe Astbury
Baronetage of the United Kingdom
Preceded by William Agnew	Baronet (of Great Stanhope Street); 1910–1941	Succeeded by John Agnew
