= Geoffrey Agnew =

English art dealer

Sir Geoffrey Agnew
- Born: Geoffrey William Gerald Agnew; 11 July 1908
- Died: 22 November 1986 (aged 78), London, England, UK
- Occupations: Art dealer, business executive and chairman
- Years active: 1931-1986
- Known for: Chairman of the family firm of art dealers, Thomas Agnew & Sons
- Spouse: Doreen, Lady Agnew (née Jessel) (m. 1934)
- Children: 3

Sir Geoffrey William Gerald Agnew (11 July 1908 – 22 November 1986) was an English art dealer, the chairman of the family firm of art dealers, Thomas Agnew & Sons, and the "dean of London art dealers".

== Early life ==
Geoffrey Agnew was born on 11 July 1908, the son of Charles Gerald Agnew and his wife, Olive Mary Agnew (née Danks), and the grandson of Charles Morland Agnew. He was educated at Eton, followed by Trinity College, Cambridge.

== Career ==
He joined Agnew's in 1931, rising to managing director in 1937.

He was a fellow of Eton College, a former chairman of the Society of London Art Dealers, president since 1981 of the Artists' General Benevolent Institution and chairman of the Friends of the Courtauld Institute since 1970. He was the author of Agnew's 1817-1967, an informal history published in the firm's 175th anniversary year.

== Personal life ==
He married Doreen Jessel in 1934, whom he met when she was one of the original students at the Courtauld Institute of Art History in London. They had three children: Julian (the last chairman of Agnew's before it was sold in 2013), Jonathan (banker & CEO of Kleinwort Benson) & Jennifer (Mrs Lazell).
