= Charles Royle, Baron Royle =

British politician

Charles Royle, Baron Royle, JP (23 January 1896 – 30 September 1975) was a British businessman and Labour politician.

== Background ==
He was the son of Charles Royle, who had been also a Member of Parliament, and his wife Maria, daughter of Oliver Wolfe. Royle was educated at Stockport Grammar School and joined the Royal Engineers in the First World War. He worked then in the retail meat trade.

== Career ==
He joined the Liberal Party and served as Secretary of Stockport Young Liberals. By 1933 he had joined the Labour Party. In 1935, Royle contested Lancaster unsuccessfully. At the recreation of the Ministry of Food in 1939, he became a meat agent and after the end of the Second World War, he entered the British House of Commons, sitting for Salford West. He was elected president of the Manchester and Saiford Meat Association in 1942, a post he held until the following year. During his time in the House, Royle was appointed a Lord of the Treasury in 1950 and one year later, became an opposition whip until 1954. Following his retirement in 1964, he was created a life peer with the title Baron Royle, of Pendleton, in the City of Salford on 25 August. At the House of Lords, he was nominated a deputy speaker.

Royle was a Justice of the Peace for Brighton and sat in the Stockport Borough Council. He served as a deputy chairman of the Magistrates' Association and was a co-chairman of the British-Caribbean Association. Royle was president of the Sussex branch of the National Association of Probation Officers and a vice-president of Association of Metropolitan Corporations. An honorary fellow of the Institute of Architects and Surveyors, he was also chairman of the Alliance Building Society.

== Family ==
In 1919, he married Florence Smith, daughter of Henry Smith, and had by her an only daughter.

Parliament of the United Kingdom
Preceded by James Frederick Emery	Member of Parliament for Salford West; 1945 – 1964	Succeeded by Stanley Orme
