= Charles Morland Agnew =

British art dealer and philanthropist (1855–1931)

- Drawing of Agnew from May 1924.
- Born: 14 December 1855
- Died: 23 May 1931 (aged 75)
- Spouse: Evelyn Mary Naylor (m. 1881)
- Children: 6, including William Gladstone Agnew
- Parent(s): Sir William Agnew, 1st Baronet; Lady Mary Kenworthy
- Relatives: Sir George Agnew, 2nd Baronet (brother); Geoffrey Agnew (grandson)

Charles Morland Agnew OBE (14 December 1855 – 23 May 1931) was a British art dealer and philanthropist.

== Early life ==
He was the second son of Sir William Agnew, 1st Baronet and his wife, Lady Mary (née Kenworthy). He was educated at Rugby School before he matriculated to Trinity College, Cambridge, in 1874.

He began playing rugby union at Rugby School and played for Cambridge University, winning two sporting 'Blues' by playing in the Varsity Match in both 1875 and 1876. His brothers George and Walter also represented Cambridge University at rugby. Agnew received his BA in 1879 and his Master of Arts in 1883.

== Later life and philanthropy ==
During the First World War, Agnew worked for the Red Cross Society in the Wounded and Missing Department, and, in 1918, he was invested as an Officer of the Order of the British Empire (OBE).

In 1921, Agnew funded the building of the Evelyn Nursing Home on land owned by Trinity College, Cambridge. The hospital cost £27,000 to build and was donated as thanks after a successful operation on his wife. The hospital is now under the ownership of Nuffield Health. In 1930, Agnew was appointed High Sheriff of Hertfordshire.

== Personal life ==
In 1881 he married Evelyn Mary Naylor, daughter of William Naylor. They had six children:

- Charles Gerald Agnew (b. 1882), father of Sir Geoffrey Agnew
- Emily Margaret Agnew (1884–1941)
- Lt.-Col. Kenneth Morland Agnew, DSO, MC, OBE (1886–1951)
- Major Alan Graeme Agnew (1887–1962)
- Commander Hugh Ladas Agnew (1894–1975)
- Vice-Admiral Sir William Gladstone Agnew (1898–1960)

He died on 23 May 1931 at Croxley Green. Evelyn died a year later and their ashes were scattered on the grounds of the Evelyn Nursing Hospital.
