= 1920 Salford Borough Council election =

Local election in Lancashire, England

- 1 November 1920

16 of 64 seats on Salford County Borough Council 33 seats needed for a majority
	First party	Second party	Third party
Party	Conservative	Liberal	Labour
Last election	5 seats, 28.4%	3 seats, 27.3%	8 seats, 32.0%
Seats before	28	24	12
Seats won	6	5	4
Seats after	26	23	14
Seat change	▼2	▼1	▲2
Popular vote	11,541	6,121	15,940
Percentage	32.6%	17.3%	45.1%
Swing	▲4.2%	▼10.0%	▲13.1%
	Fourth party
Party	Independent
Last election	0 seats, 8.5%
Seats before	0
Seats won	1
Seats after	1
Seat change	▲1
Popular vote	1,768
Percentage	5.0%
Swing	▼3.5%
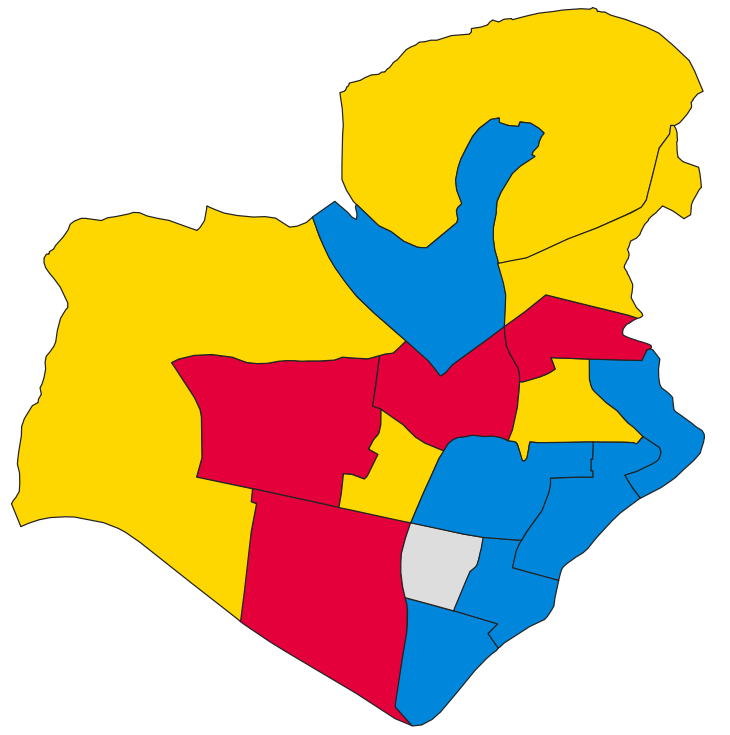
- Map of results of 1920 election
Leader of the Council before election
No overall control
Leader of the Council after election
No overall control

Elections to Salford Borough Council were held on Monday, 1 November 1920. One third of the councillors seats were up for election, with each successful candidate to serve a three-year term of office. The council remained under no overall control.

== Election result ==
Party	Votes		Seats			Full Council	
Conservative Party	11,541 (32.6%)	▲4.2	6 (37.5%)	6 / 16	▼2	26 (40.6%)	26 / 64
Liberal Party	6,121 (17.3%)	▼10.0	5 (31.3%)	5 / 16	▼1	23 (35.9%)	23 / 64
Labour Party	15,940 (45.1%)	▲13.1	4 (25.0%)	4 / 16	▲2	14 (21.9%)	14 / 64
Independent	1,768 (5.0%)	▼3.5	1 (6.3%)	1 / 16	▲1	1 (1.6%)	1 / 64

=== Full council ===
↓
14	23	1	26

=== Aldermen ===
↓
8	8

=== Councillors ===
↓
14	15	1	18

== Ward results ==
=== Albert Park ===
Albert Park
Party	Candidate	Votes	%	±%
Liberal	J. E. Collins	uncontested		
Liberal hold		Swing		

=== Charlestown ===
Charlestown
Party	Candidate	Votes	%	±%
Conservative	W. Crossley	1,516	48.4	N/A
Labour	J. J. Richardson*	1,441	46.1	N/A
Independent	J. W. Oxley	172	5.5	N/A
Majority		75	2.3	
Turnout		3,129	78.4	+21.5
Conservative gain from Labour		Swing		

=== Crescent ===
Crescent
Party	Candidate	Votes	%	±%
Conservative	S. H. Kettle*	1,226	54.5	−9.4
Labour	F. McHale	1,023	45.5	N/A
Majority		203	9.0	−18.8
Turnout		2,249	56.9	+8.6
Conservative hold		Swing		

=== Grosvenor ===
Grosvenor
Party	Candidate	Votes	%	±%
Labour	A. Atherton	1,532	59.6	N/A
Conservative	G. Fearnehough	650	25.3	−31.8
Independent	J. Maguire	389	15.1	N/A
Majority		882	34.3	
Turnout		2,571	55.6	+9.0
Labour gain from Conservative		Swing		

=== Hope ===
Hope
Party	Candidate	Votes	%	±%
Liberal	A. H. Collins*	2,790	62.1	N/A
Labour	J. Shorten	1,704	37.9	N/A
Majority		1,086	24.2	N/A
Turnout		4,494	51.5	N/A
Liberal hold		Swing		

=== Islington ===
Islington
Party	Candidate	Votes	%	±%
Conservative	W. S. Roberts	1,055	59.1	+14.0
Labour	T. Neavsey	667	37.4	−17.5
Independent	J. T. Wicks	63	3.5	N/A
Majority		388	21.7	
Turnout		1,785	60.5	+7.2
Conservative hold		Swing		

=== Kersal ===
Kersal
Party	Candidate	Votes	%	±%
Liberal	W. P. Burnley*	uncontested		
Liberal hold		Swing		

=== Ordsall ===
Ordsall
Party	Candidate	Votes	%	±%
Conservative	F. Hampson*	1,872	58.3	+19.6
Labour	J. E. Tilbrook	1,340	41.7	−19.6
Majority		532	16.6	
Turnout		3,212	64.1	+34.5
Conservative hold		Swing		

=== Regent ===
Regent
Party	Candidate	Votes	%	±%
Independent	J. Higginbottom	1,144	43.9	N/A
Liberal	G. R. Greatorex*	1,066	41.0	−5.0
Labour	P. Moulson	393	15.1	−3.6
Majority		78	2.9	
Turnout		2,603	63.3	+12.3
Independent gain from Liberal		Swing		

=== St. Matthias' ===
St. Matthias'
Party	Candidate	Votes	%	±%
Liberal	J. Willett*	uncontested		
Liberal hold		Swing		

=== St. Paul's ===
St. Paul's
Party	Candidate	Votes	%	±%
Liberal	J. P. McDougall	1,181	50.4	N/A
Labour	T. Wilber*	1,162	49.6	−1.1
Majority		19	0.8	
Turnout		2,343	53.8	−6.4
Liberal gain from Labour		Swing		

=== St. Thomas' ===
St. Thomas'
Party	Candidate	Votes	%	±%
Labour	J. W. Bloom	1,219	55.9	+8.5
Conservative	J. H. Coop*	960	44.1	−8.5
Majority		259	11.8	
Turnout		2,179	57.5	+23.5
Labour gain from Conservative		Swing		

=== Seedley ===
Seedley
Party	Candidate	Votes	%	±%
Labour	E. E. Dale	2,521	54.7	−6.1
Conservative	J. F. Emery	2,085	45.3	N/A
Majority		436	9.4	−12.2
Turnout		4,606	50.0	+10.5
Labour gain from Conservative		Swing		

=== Trafford ===
Trafford
Party	Candidate	Votes	%	±%
Conservative	A. Williamson*	1,374	59.8	N/A
Labour	F. Ramwell	922	40.2	N/A
Majority		452	19.6	N/A
Turnout		2,296	58.3	N/A
Conservative hold		Swing		

=== Trinity ===
Trinity
Party	Candidate	Votes	%	±%
Conservative	H. J. Wheatley	803	51.8	+8.1
Labour	J. Bradshaw	748	48.2	−0.6
Majority		55	3.6	
Turnout		1,551	53.8	+5.5
Conservative hold		Swing		

=== Weaste ===
Weaste
Party	Candidate	Votes	%	±%
Labour	G. W. Sands	1,268	53.9	N/A
Liberal	W. H. Parkinson	1,084	46.1	N/A
Majority		184	7.8	N/A
Turnout		2,352	50.2	N/A
Labour gain from Liberal		Swing		

== Aldermanic elections ==
=== Aldermanic elections, 9 November 1920 ===
At the meeting of the council on 9 November 1920, the terms of office of eight aldermen expired.

The following eight were elected as aldermen by the council on 9 November 1920 for a term of six years.

Party	Alderman	Ward	Term expires
Conservative	W. H. Barrett*		1926
Conservative	John H. Cottrill*		1926
Liberal	Ernest Desquesnes*		1926
Conservative	John Griffiths*		1926
Conservative	Julius Hulton*		1926
Conservative	Henry Linsley*		1926
Conservative	Edwin Mather*		1926
Liberal	F. S. Phillips*		1926

Caused by the resignation on 27 October 1920 of Alderman Sir William Stephens (Liberal, elected as an alderman by the council on 9 November 1901).

In his place, Councillor Frederick Hampson (Conservative, Ordsall, elected 11 June 1901) was elected as an alderman by the council on 9 November 1920.

Party	Alderman	Ward	Term expires
Conservative	Frederick Hampson		1923

=== Aldermanic election, 5 October 1921 ===
Caused by the death on 17 August 1921 of Alderman Henry Linsley (Conservative, elected as an alderman by the council on 9 November 1898).

In his place, Councillor W. P. Burnley (Liberal, Kersal, elected 1 November 1901) was elected as an alderman by the council on 5 October 1921.

Party	Alderman	Ward	Term expires
Liberal	W. P. Burnley	St. Matthias'	1926

=== Aldermanic election, 26 October 1921 ===
Caused by the resignation on 18 October 1921 of Alderman Anthony Hailwood (Liberal, elected as an alderman by the council on 1 September 1921).

In his place, Councillor S. H. Lees (Conservative, Trinity, elected 1 November 1902) was elected as an alderman by the council on 26 October 1921.

Party	Alderman	Ward	Term expires
Conservative	S. H. Lees		1923

== By-elections between 1920 and 1921 ==
=== Ordsall, 30 November 1920 ===
Caused by the election as an alderman of Councillor Frederick Hampson (Conservative, Ordsall, elected 11 June 1901) on 9 November 1920, following the resignation on 27 October 1920 of Alderman Sir William Stephens (Liberal, elected as an alderman by the council on 9 November 1901).

Ordsall
Party	Candidate	Votes	%	±%
Conservative	A. Worthington	1,443	55.3	−3.0
Labour	J. E. Tilbrook	1,168	44.7	+3.0
Majority		275	10.6	−6.0
Turnout		2,611		
Conservative hold		Swing		

=== Kersal, 17 October 1921 ===
Caused by the election as an alderman of Councillor W. P. Burnley (Liberal, Kersal, elected 1 November 1901) on 5 October 1921, following the death on 17 August 1921 of Alderman Henry Linsley (Conservative, elected as an alderman by the council on 9 November 1898).

Kersal
Party	Candidate	Votes	%	±%
Liberal	J. Jackson	uncontested		
Liberal hold		Swing		
