= Lees Knowles =

British barrister, historian and politician (1857–1928)

Sir Lees Knowles Bt KStJ CVO
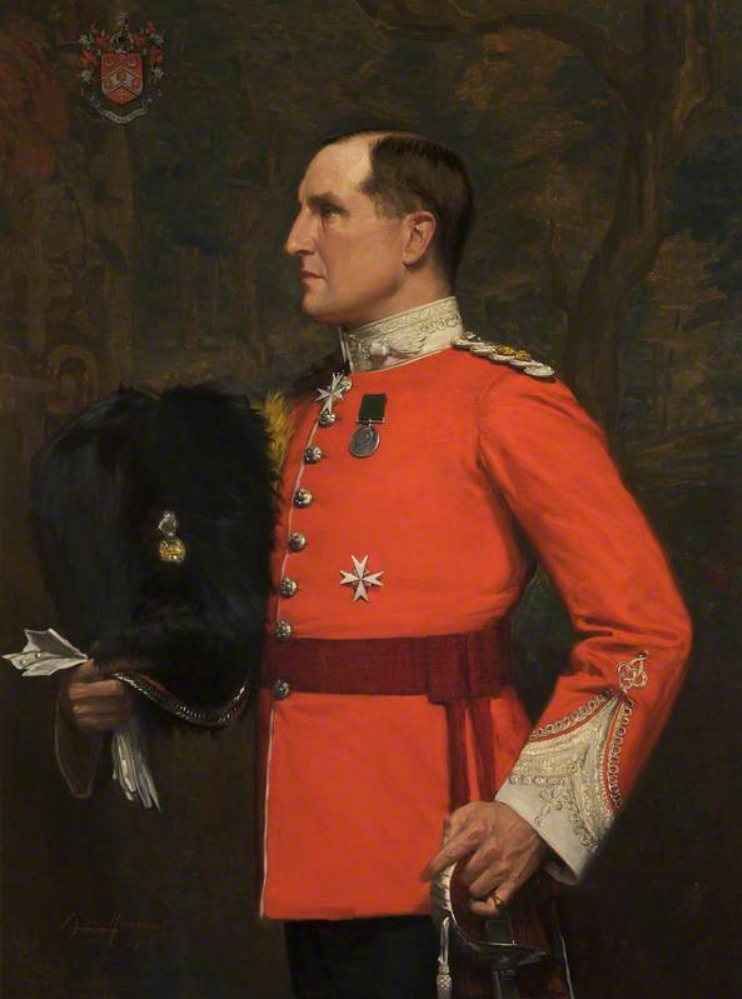
- Painting by Charles Van Havermaet, 1906

Member of Parliament for Salford West
- In office 1886–1906
- Preceded by: Benjamin Armitage
- Succeeded by: Sir George Wiliam Agnew

Personal details
- Born: 16 February 1857 Oldham, Lancashire, England
- Died: 7 October 1928 (aged 71) Pendlebury, Lancashire, England
- Party: Conservative
- Spouse: Lady Nina Ogilvy-Grant (m. 1915)
- Education: Rugby School
- Alma mater: Trinity College, Cambridge; Lincoln's Inn
- Military career
- Allegiance: United Kingdom
- Branch: British Army
- Rank: Lieutenant Colonel; Honorary Colonel
- Units: Volunteer Force; Territorial Force
- Commands: Lancashire Fusiliers

Sir Lees Knowles, 1st Baronet, KStJ, CVO (16 February 1857 – 7 October 1928) was a British barrister, military historian and Conservative politician.

== Early life ==
Knowles was the son of John Knowles and Elizabeth Lees of Green Bank, Oldham, Lancashire whose family owned Andrew Knowles and Sons, collieries in the Irwell Valley. He was educated at Rugby School and at Trinity College, Cambridge.

He was a prominent athlete at both institutions and became president of the Cambridge University Athletics Club. Knowles became the British half-mile champion after winning the AAC Championships title at the 1878 AAC Championships. He studied law, and was called to the bar at Lincoln's Inn in 1882.

== Career ==
=== Politics ===
Knowles was involved in Unionist politics, and stood unsuccessfully for the Conservatives at Leigh in the 1885 general election. In the following year, another general election was held, and he was returned as Member of Parliament for Salford West.

From 1887 to 1892, Knowles held an appointment as unpaid parliamentary secretary to Charles Ritchie, President of the Local Government Board. On 24 April 1890, he brought a motion before the House of Commons and was subsequently appointed to formulate the Royal Commission on Tuberculosis.

Knowles remained unpaid parliamentary secretary when Ritchie became President of the Board of Trade in 1895. From 1896 to 1906, he was Second Church Estates Commissioner. He was created a baronet, "of Westwood in the County of Lancaster", in the 1903 Birthday Honours.

In December 1904, he was knighted as a Knight of Grace of the Order of Saint John (KStJ).

His parliamentary career came to an end when he lost his seat at the 1906 general election.

=== Military ===
Knowles had a great interest in military history, and wrote a number of books on the life of Napoleon. In 1912 he made a bequest to his alma mater, Trinity College. This established the Lees Knowles Lectureship, an annual series of talks on military science given by distinguished military and naval figures.

He held a commission as an officer in the Volunteer Force and its successor the Territorial Force, reaching the rank of lieutenant-colonel. After a stint as Honorary Colonel of the 3rd (Volunteer) battalion of the Lancashire Fusiliers, he was on 14 May 1902 appointed lieutenant-colonel in command of the battalion. At various times he commanded the 3rd, 7th and 8th battalions of the Lancashire Fusiliers. He subsequently became the vice-chairman of the Lancashire Territorial Army Association.

Knowles was a philanthropist, supporting a number of charities, notably the Guinness Trust for Housing the Poor. He died in on 7 October 1928, aged 71, at his home in Westwood, Pendlebury.

== Family ==
In 1915, Knowles married Lady Nina Ogilvy-Grant, youngest daughter of Francis Ogilvy-Grant, 10th Earl of Seafield. Lady Nina was presumably the Lady Nina Ogilvy-Grant who appeared at a meeting of the Conservative and Unionist Women's Franchise Association on 11 May 1909 at 52 Portland Place in London, as reported by Votes for Women, the organ of the Women's Social and Political Union. They had no children.

== Arms ==
Coat of arms of Arms of Sir Lees Knowles, Baronet of Westwood and Turton Tower
Crest In front of a ram's head, couped, argent, armed or, three roses fessewise as in the arms. Escutcheon Gules, on a chevron cotised, between in chief two crescents and in base a cross-crosslet all argent, three roses of the field barbed and seeded proper. Motto Nec diu nec frustra ("Neither for long nor in vain") Symbolism The escutcheon and crest incorporates elements of previous arms used by the Knowles/Knolles/Knollys family. The canton of the baronet at the top left is the Red Hand of Ulster, sinister.

== Works ==
- Lees Knowles, A day with corps-students in Germany
- Knowles, Lees (1914). Minden and the Seven Years War. Simpkin, Marshall, Hamilton, Kent & Company.

As editor

- Lutyens, Engelbert (1915). Knowles, Lees (ed.). Letters of Captain Engelbert Lutyens: Orderly Officer at Longwood, Saint Helena: Feb. 1820 to Nov. 1823. John Lane.

Parliament of the United Kingdom
Preceded by Benjamin Armitage	Member of Parliament for Salford West; 1886 – 1906	Succeeded by Sir George Wiliam Agnew
Church of England titles
Preceded by George Leveson Gower	Second Church Estates Commissioner; 1895–1906	Succeeded by Francis Stevenson
Baronetage of the United Kingdom
New creation	Baronet (of Westwood and Turton Tower in the County of Lancaster); 1903 – 1928	Extinct
Preceded by Smiley baronets	Knowles baronets of Westwood and Turton Tower; 20 November 1903	Succeeded by Bingham baronets
