= Salford West =

Parliamentary constituency in the United Kingdom, 1885–1983

- Former borough constituency for the House of Commons
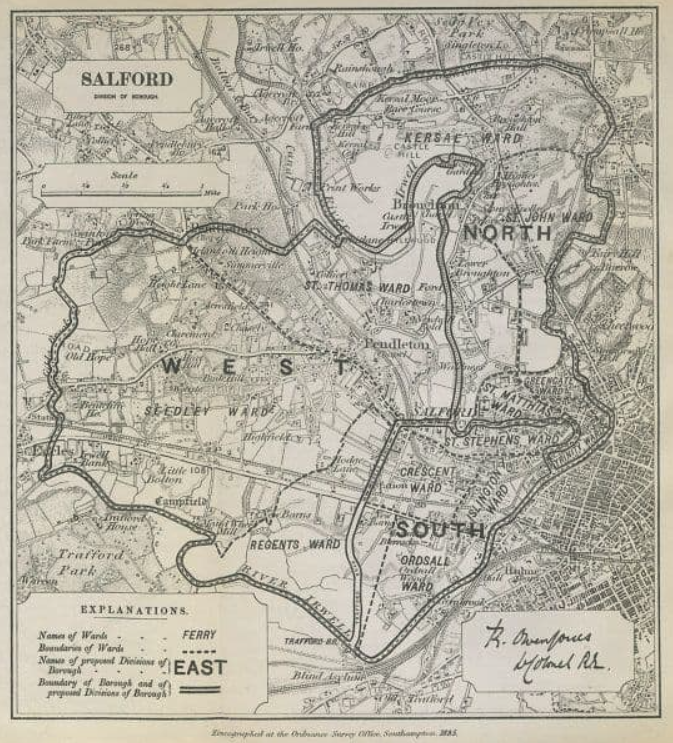
- 1885 map by Robert Owen Jones

1885–1983
- Seats: one
- Created from: Salford
- Replaced by: Eccles and Salford East

Salford West was a parliamentary constituency in the City of Salford in Greater Manchester from 1885 until 1983. It returned one Member of Parliament (MP) to the House of Commons of the Parliament of the United Kingdom.

== History ==
The constituency was created for the 1885 general election by the Redistribution of Seats Act 1885, which split the two-member Salford constituency into three divisions: Salford North, Salford South and Salford West. It was abolished for the 1983 general election.

== Boundaries ==
Salford West in Lancashire, boundaries used 1974–1983

1885–1918: The Municipal Borough of Salford wards of St Thomas's and Seedley, and part of Regent ward.

1918–1950: The County Borough of Salford wards of Hope, St Paul's, St Thomas's, and Seedley.

1950–1983: The County Borough of Salford wards of Charlestown, Claremont, Docks, Langworthy, St Paul's, St Thomas's, Seedley, and Weaste.

== Members of Parliament ==
Election	Member	Party
1885	Benjamin Armitage	Liberal
1886	Lees Knowles	Conservative
1906	George Agnew	Liberal
1918	Frederick Astbury	Conservative
1923	Alexander Haycock	Labour
1924	Frederick Astbury	Conservative
1929	Alexander Haycock	Labour
1931	Frederick Astbury	Conservative
1935	James Emery	Conservative
1945	Charles Royle	Labour
1964	Stan Orme	Labour
1983	constituency abolished	

== Elections ==
=== Elections in the 1880s ===
Armitage

General election 1885: Salford West
Party	Candidate	Votes	%	±%
Liberal	Benjamin Armitage	3,755	51.9	
Conservative	William Cayley Worsley	3,481	48.1	
Majority		274	3.8	
Turnout		7,236	88.3	
Registered electors		8,197		
Liberal win (new seat)				

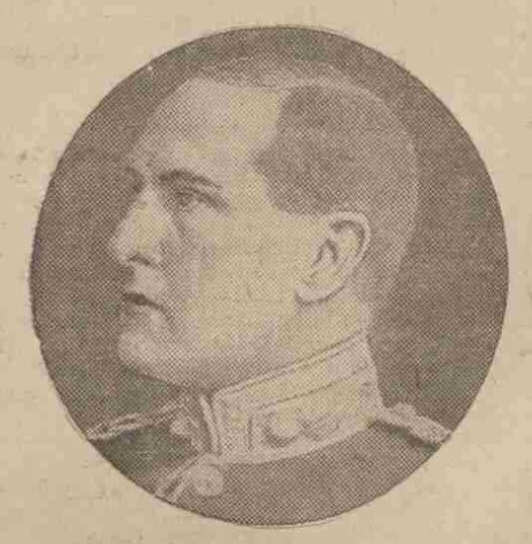
Knowles

General election 1886: Salford West
Party	Candidate	Votes	%	±%
Conservative	Lees Knowles	3,399	50.9	+2.8
Liberal	Benjamin Armitage	3,283	49.1	−2.8
Majority		116	1.8	N/A
Turnout		6,682	81.5	−6.8
Registered electors		8,197		
Conservative gain from Liberal		Swing	+2.8	

=== Elections in the 1890s ===
General election 1892: Salford West
Party	Candidate	Votes	%	±%
Conservative	Lees Knowles	4,152	50.2	−0.7
Liberal	Benjamin Armitage	4,112	49.8	+0.7
Majority		40	0.4	−1.4
Turnout		8,264	85.8	+4.3
Registered electors		9,635		
Conservative hold		Swing	−0.7	

General election 1895: Salford West
Party	Candidate	Votes	%	±%
Conservative	Lees Knowles	4,354	50.6	+0.4
Liberal	Vernon Kirk Armitage	4,254	49.4	−0.4
Majority		100	1.2	+0.8
Turnout		8,608	82.5	−3.3
Registered electors		10,439		
Conservative hold		Swing	+0.4	

=== Elections in the 1900s ===
Mallet

General election 1900: Salford West
Party	Candidate	Votes	%	±%
Conservative	Lees Knowles	5,503	55.9	+5.3
Liberal	Charles Mallet	4,341	44.1	−5.3
Majority		1,162	11.8	+10.6
Turnout		9,844	80.6	−1.9
Registered electors		12,213		
Conservative hold		Swing	+5.3	

General election 1906: Salford West
Party	Candidate	Votes	%	±%
Liberal	George Agnew	7,329	58.9	+14.8
Conservative	Lees Knowles	5,119	41.1	−14.8
Majority		2,210	17.8	N/A
Turnout		12,448	90.1	+9.5
Registered electors		13,814		
Liberal gain from Conservative		Swing	+14.8	

=== Elections in the 1910s ===
General election January 1910: Salford West
Party	Candidate	Votes	%	±%
Liberal	George Agnew	6,216	44.9	−14.0
Liberal Unionist	Carlyon Bellairs	5,238	37.8	−3.3
Independent Labour	A. A. Purcell	2,396	17.3	New
Majority		978	7.1	−10.7
Turnout		13,850	91.8	+1.7
Registered electors		15,083		
Liberal hold		Swing	−5.4	

Sir Geo. Agnew

General election December 1910: Salford West
Party	Candidate	Votes	%	±%
Liberal	George Agnew	6,633	53.3	+8.4
Conservative	George Edward Raine	5,802	46.7	+8.9
Majority		831	6.6	−0.5
Turnout		12,435	82.4	−9.4
Registered electors		15,083		
Liberal hold		Swing	−0.3	

General Election 1914–15:

Another General Election was required to take place before the end of 1915. The political parties had been making preparations for an election to take place and by the July 1914, the following candidates had been selected;

- Liberal: William Stephens
- Unionist:

General election 1918: Salford West
Party		Candidate	Votes	%	±%
	Unionist	Frederick Astbury	9,478	48.5	+1.8
C	Liberal	William Stephens (mayor)	5,554	28.4	−24.9
	Labour	Rhys Davies	4,503	23.1	New
Majority			3,924	20.1	N/A
Turnout			19,535	59.1	−23.3
	Unionist gain from Liberal		Swing	+13.3	
C indicates candidate endorsed by the coalition government.

=== Elections in the 1920s ===
General election 1922: Salford West
Party	Candidate	Votes	%	±%
Unionist	Frederick Astbury	12,130	44.9	−3.6
Labour	Arthur Law	8,724	32.3	+9.2
Liberal	William Milligan	6,174	22.8	−5.6
Majority		3,406	12.6	−7.5
Turnout		27,028		
Unionist hold		Swing		

General election 1923: Salford West
Party	Candidate	Votes	%	±%
Labour	Alexander Haycock	9,868	38.4	+6.1
Unionist	Frederick Astbury	9,752	37.9	−7.0
Liberal	George Hay Morgan	6,097	23.7	+0.9
Majority		116	0.5	N/A
Turnout		25,717	76.5	
Labour gain from Unionist		Swing	+6.5	

General election 1924: Salford West
Party	Candidate	Votes	%	±%
Unionist	Frederick Astbury	16,719	57.5	+19.6
Labour	Alexander Haycock	12,369	42.5	+4.1
Majority		4,350	15.0	N/A
Turnout		29,088	84.7	+8.2
Unionist gain from Labour		Swing		

Mary Grant

General election 1929: Salford West
Party	Candidate	Votes	%	±%
Labour	Alexander Haycock	15,647	42.8	+0.3
Unionist	Frederick Astbury	15,289	41.8	−15.7
Liberal	Mary Pollock Grant	5,614	15.4	New
Majority		358	1.0	N/A
Turnout		36.550	83.4	−1.3
Labour gain from Unionist		Swing	+8.0	

=== Elections in the 1930s ===
General election 1931: Salford West
Party	Candidate	Votes	%	±%
Conservative	Frederick Astbury	24,083	66.2	+24.4
Labour	Alexander Haycock	12,320	33.8	−9.0
Majority		11,763	32.4	N/A
Turnout		36,403		
Conservative gain from Labour		Swing		

General election 1935: Salford West
Party	Candidate	Votes	%	±%
Conservative	James Emery	19,245	52.8	−13.4
Labour	Alexander Haycock	14,732	40.4	+7.6
Liberal	Frank Kenyon	2,492	6.8	New
Majority		4,513	12.4	−20.0
Turnout		36,649		
Conservative hold		Swing		

General Election 1939–40

Another General Election was required to take place before the end of 1940. The political parties had been making preparations for an election to take place and by the Autumn of 1939, the following candidates had been selected;

- Conservative: James Emery
- Labour: Charles Royle
- Liberal: Richard Pugh

=== Elections in the 1940s ===
General election 1945: Salford West
Party	Candidate	Votes	%	±%
Labour	Charles Royle	17,010	50.7	+10.3
Conservative	James Emery	13,321	39.7	−13.1
Liberal	Richard Pugh	3,180	9.6	+2.8
Majority		3,869	11.0	N/A
Turnout		33,511		
Labour gain from Conservative		Swing		

=== Elections in the 1950s ===
General election 1950: Salford West
Party	Candidate	Votes	%	±%
Labour	Charles Royle	26,885	51.1	+0.4
Conservative	S Bell	21,593	41.0	+1.3
Liberal	Leslie Hall Storey	4,124	7.8	−1.8
Majority		5,292	10.1	−0.9
Turnout		52,602		
Labour hold		Swing		

General election 1951: Salford West
Party	Candidate	Votes	%	±%
Labour	Charles Royle	27,542	53.4	+2.3
Conservative	G William Sinclair	24,055	46.6	+5.6
Majority		3,487	6.8	−3.3
Turnout		51,597		
Labour hold		Swing		

General election 1955: Salford West
Party	Candidate	Votes	%	±%
Labour	Charles Royle	22,413	51.0	−2.4
Conservative	Henry Donald Moore	21,554	49.0	+2.4
Majority		859	2.0	−4.8
Turnout		43,967		
Labour hold		Swing		

General election 1959: Salford West
Party	Candidate	Votes	%	±%
Labour	Charles Royle	23,167	53.3	+2.3
Conservative	Herbert Henry Davies	20,306	46.7	−2.3
Majority		2,861	6.6	+4.6
Turnout		43,473		
Labour hold		Swing		

=== Elections in the 1960s ===
General election 1964: Salford West
Party	Candidate	Votes	%	±%
Labour	Stan Orme	20,490	55.5	+2.2
Conservative	Albert Edwin Clark	16,446	44.5	−2.2
Majority		4,044	11.0	+3.4
Turnout		36,936		
Labour hold		Swing	+2.2	

General election 1966: Salford West
Party	Candidate	Votes	%	±%
Labour	Stan Orme	19,237	59.2	+3.7
Conservative	Albert Edwin Clark	13,257	40.8	−3.7
Majority		5,980	18.4	+7.4
Turnout		32,494		
Labour hold		Swing	+3.7	

=== Elections in the 1970s ===
General election 1970: Salford West
Party	Candidate	Votes	%	±%
Labour	Stan Orme	16,986	54.3	−4.9
Conservative	Albert Edwin Clark	14,310	45.7	+4.9
Majority		2,676	8.6	−9.8
Turnout		31,296	65.5	
Labour hold		Swing	−4.9	

General election February 1974: Salford West
Party	Candidate	Votes	%	±%
Labour	Stan Orme	16,808	51.3	−3.0
Conservative	Jeffery Nicholas Lewis Tillett	10,346	31.6	−14.1
Liberal	Albert Edward Arstall	5,591	17.1	New
Majority		6,462	19.7	+11.1
Turnout		32,745	72.0	+6.5
Labour hold		Swing	+5.6	

General election October 1974: Salford West
Party	Candidate	Votes	%	±%
Labour	Stan Orme	17,112	57.2	+5.9
Conservative	Jeffery Nicholas Lewis Tillett	8,540	28.6	−3.0
Liberal	Albert Edward Arstall	4,237	14.2	−2.9
Majority		8,572	28.6	+8.9
Turnout		29,889	65.2	−6.8
Labour hold		Swing	+4.5	

General election 1979: Salford West
Party	Candidate	Votes	%	±%
Labour	Stan Orme	18,411	61.5	+4.3
Conservative	James Markwick	11,157	37.2	+8.6
Workers Revolutionary	Stuart Carter	383	1.3	New
Majority		7,254	24.3	−4.3
Turnout		29,951	68.7	+3.5
Labour hold		Swing	−2.2	
