= Alexander Haycock =

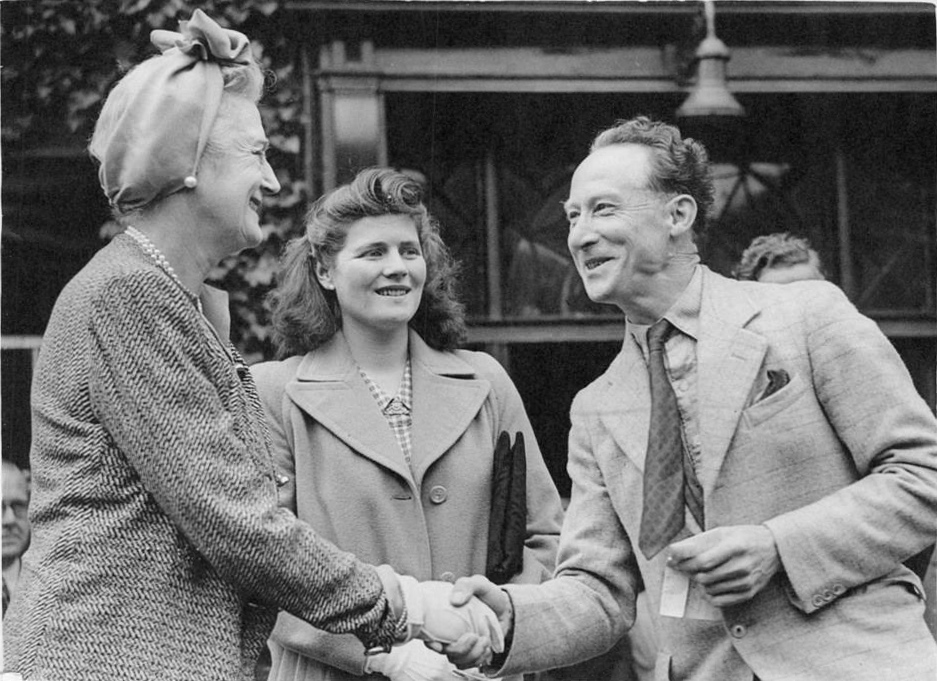
Alexander Haycock congratulate Clementine Churchill for her election triumph in Woodford, 1945.

Alexander Wilkinson Frederick Haycock (28 December 1882 – 15 December 1970) was a Canadian-born British Labour politician, a leading member of the free trade movement.

Born in Ontario, Alexander Wilkinson Haycock was the son of Joseph Longford Haycock – an MPP in Ontario. His maternal uncle John Thomas Grange was also an MPP. He was educated at Kingston Collegiate Institute and Queen's University. Prior to the outbreak of the First World War he had taken up residence in the United Kingdom, was working as a commercial traveller, and was a secretary and lecturer for Norman Angell's Neutrality League. In the First World War he was a conscientious objector, and was sentenced by courts-martial to three terms of imprisonment with hard labour after military service tribunals recognised his objection only to the extent of allowing him service in the Non-Combatant Corps, which he refused to accept.

== Parliamentary career ==
In the 1922 general election he stood as Labour candidate at Winchester, but failed to be elected in this safe Conservative seat. In the following year the prime minister, Stanley Baldwin, called an election on the issue of tariff reform. Haycock was chosen to contest the constituency of Salford West, and managed to unseat the sitting Conservative member of parliament, Lieutenant-Commander Frederick Astbury. Following the election, a minority Labour government under Ramsay MacDonald was formed. The administration collapsed in the following year, necessitating a further general election. Haycock attempted to defend his seat, but there was a landslide to the Conservatives, and he was defeated by Astbury, his opponent of the previous year.

The next election was held in 1929. Haycock stood once more as Labour candidate at Salford West. There was a swing to Labour, which became the largest party in the Commons for the first time and Haycock returned to parliament. In a notable incident, Haycock publicly defied Manchester City Council's bylaws prohibiting the playing of games in city parks on Sundays. In front of a large crowd he played a game of bowls in Gorton Park and indicated his willingness to suffer imprisonment rather than pay a fine or be bound over. Although his name and address was taken by the park superintendent, no charges were brought.

By the time of the next general election in 1931 a National Government had been formed. Haycock and the majority of the Labour Party MPs refused to support the government, and he was heavily defeated by Frederick Astbury, running as a "National" Conservative, who became Salford West's MP for the third time.

== Later parliamentary contests ==
At the 1935 general election Haycock attempted to regain the Salford West constituency for Labour, but failed to be elected. Elections were postponed due to the onset of World War II with the next election in 1945. Haycock stood unsuccessfully for Labour at the new constituency of Bucklow, which included parts of Manchester's Wythenshawe council estate.

In December 1957 Haycock, then aged 75, and described as a barrister, declared he would stand as an Independent Labour candidate for the forthcoming by-election at Rochdale. He subsequently announced he was considering standing aside, and had invited J B Priestley to stand in his place. He claimed that his doctor had told him "this campaign will kill me". Priestley, however, denied any interest in contesting the election. In January 1958 Haycock stood aside, feeling his position was very close to that of the TUC and the official Labour Party and he did not want to "score a goal for the other side".

He died at Tarporley in December 1970 aged 87.

Parliament of the United Kingdom
Preceded by Frederick Wolfe Astbury	Member of Parliament for Salford West; 1923 – 1924	Succeeded by Frederick Wolfe Astbury
Preceded by Frederick Wolfe Astbury	Member of Parliament for Salford West; 1929 – 1931	Succeeded by Frederick Wolfe Astbury
