= Fred Astbury =

British politician

Lieutenant-Commander Frederick Wolfe Astbury (21 April 1872 – 28 December 1954) was a British businessman and Conservative politician.

== Early life ==
He was the son of Frederick James Astbury JP of Hilton Park, Prestwich, near Manchester. He entered business as a calico printer, and was a director the Manchester Chamber of Commerce. During the First World War he volunteered for service in the Royal Navy Volunteer Reserve, recruiting for the Royal Navy.

== Member of parliament for Salford West ==
At the 1918 general election he was elected as Conservative Member of Parliament for Salford West. He was re-elected at the next election in 1922. In the following year the prime minister, Stanley Baldwin, called an election on the issue of tariff reform. Astbury was regarded as having a very safe seat. However, the election saw a large electoral advance by the Labour Party, who gained all three Salford constituencies. Astbury was unseated by Labour's Alexander Haycock. Following the election, a minority Labour government under Ramsay MacDonald was formed. The administration collapsed in the following year, necessitating a further general election. Astbury regained the seat, benefitting from a large nationwide swing to the Conservatives. At the next election in 1929 the situation was reversed, there was a swing to Labour, which became the largest party in the Commons for the first time and Astbury was unseated by Haycock for a second time. By the time of the next general election in 1931 a National Government had been formed. Haycock and the majority of the Labour Party MPs refused to support the government. Astbury, running as a National Conservative highlighting a new, strengthened alliance struck with MacDonald and the National Labour Organisation in the throes of the Great Depression regained the seat.

== Resignation of National Government whip ==
In May 1935 Astbury was one of five Conservative MPs who resigned the National Government whip. They felt they could no longer support the government over their failure to impose quotas or prohibitions on imports of textile goods from India and Burma, threatening the commerce of Lancashire. The group also felt that the National Government, supported in the main by Conservative members, had passed too much "Socialist" legislation, such as that creating the London Passenger Transport Board. He was summoned to a meeting of the West Salford Conservative and Unionist Association to explain his position, having first organised a meeting of his constituents which unanimously approved his actions. A decision on whether he would be adopted as the Conservative candidate at the next election was avoided when he announced he would not be seeking re-election due to poor health.

Parliament of the United Kingdom
Preceded by Sir George Agnew	Member of Parliament for Salford West; 1918 – 1923	Succeeded by Alexander Haycock
Preceded by Alexander Haycock	Member of Parliament for Salford West; 1924 – 1929	Succeeded by Alexander Haycock
Preceded by Alexander Haycock	Member of Parliament for Salford West; 1931 – 1935	Succeeded by James Frederick Emery
