= James Gorman (politician) =

British politician and trade unionist

James Gorman (1874 – May 1950) was a British politician and trade unionist.

Born in Manchester, Gorman worked in a factory from an early age. He became involved in the socialist movement when he was eighteen, and two years later joined both the Social Democratic Federation (SDF) and the Amalgamated Society of Engineers (ASE). For some time, he also held membership of the Independent Labour Party.

Early in the 1900s, Gorman moved to Salford, where he was rapidly elected as assistant secretary of his branch of the ASE. He was also elected as a delegate to the union's conferences in 1907, 1912, 1915 and 1917. But he was most prominent in the union as a member of its Final Appeal Court, which considered the cases of members who had broken union rules. To prepare for the position, he studied the history of the union and its forerunners, and obtained copies of union rules of which its general office was unaware.

In 1917, Gorman began working full-time for the union as its Manchester Local Delegate, and the following year became its Organising District Delegate. From 1911 until 1925, he also served as a delegate to the Manchester and Salford Trades Council.

Gorman was elected to Salford City Council for St Thomas' ward in 1918, serving for three years. He was then elected in a 1923 by-election in Weaste ward, and became known for his campaign for the city to form a civic choir, but lost the seat in 1925.

Gorman stood in Salford South at the 1918 United Kingdom general election, taking a distant second place, with 19.0% of the vote. He represented the Labour Party, but was sponsored by the British Socialist Party, successor of the SDF, and ran a very left-wing campaign. At the 1922 United Kingdom general election, he again stood for the Labour Party, but this time in Plymouth Drake, where he replaced Prospective Parliamentary Candidate William Henry Watkins, who had fallen out with the local party. Gorman was sponsored by the Amalgamated Engineering Union, successor of the ASE, and took 31.4% of the vote.

By 1932, Gorman was resident in Higher Crumpsall in Manchester, and was elected to Manchester City Council that year. He was selected as the Labour Party candidate for Northwich in 1937, but although an election was expected in 1939 or 1940, it was not held due to World War II, and Gorman never contested the seat. He retired from his trade union posts in 1939, and became a Labour Supply Officer for the council during the war. Suffering from poor health, he retired from the council in 1947, and died three years later.
