= James Frederick Emery =

British politician (1886–1983)

Emery and his daughter, Margaret, around 1970

Sir James Frederick Emery (1886–1983) was a British Conservative Party politician. He was elected at the 1935 general election as the Member of Parliament (MP) for Salford West, and was defeated by the Labour candidate at the 1945 election.

Emery was one of the owners of Illawalla, an Edwardian mansion in Lancashire, which he purchased in 1942. He was unable to move into the building for three years because it was being used by the British Army as a transit camp.

== Personal life ==
Emery was born to RC and Margaret Taylor. He had two sisters. His father murdered his mother.

Parliament of the United Kingdom
Preceded by Frederick Wolfe Astbury	Member of Parliament for Salford West; 1935 – 1945	Succeeded by Charles Royle
