= 1893 Salford Borough Council election =

Local election in Salford

- 1 November 1893

16 of 64 seats on Salford County Borough Council 33 seats needed for a majority
	First party	Second party	Third party
Party	Conservative	Liberal	Independent Labour
Last election	6 seats, 33.0%	9 seats, 53.4%	did not contest
Seats before	32	31	0
Seats won	10	5	1
Seats after	33	29	1
Seat change	▲1	▼2	▲1
Popular vote	7,746	5,527	0
Percentage	52.9%	37.8%	0.0%
Swing	▲19.9%	▼15.6%	N/A
	Fourth party
Party	Independent
Last election	1 seat, 12.5%
Seats before	1
Seats won	0
Seats after	1
Seat change	Steady
Popular vote	0
Percentage	0.0%
Swing	▼12.5%
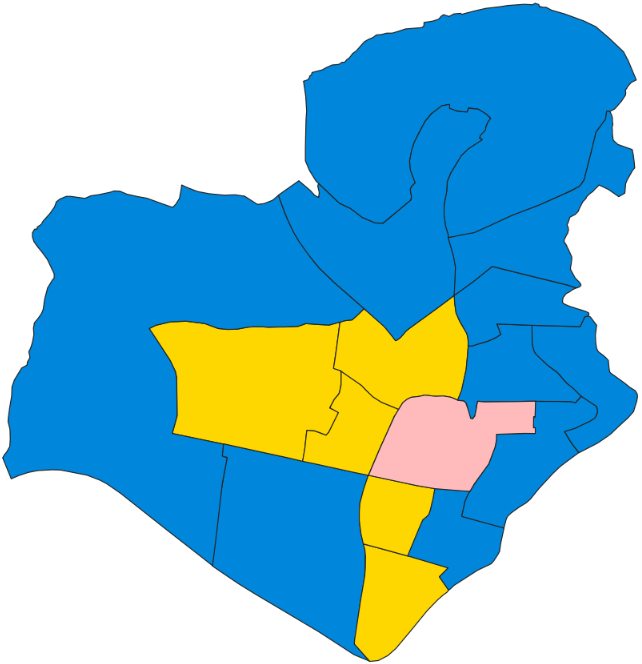
- Map of results of 1893 election
Leader of the Council before election
No overall control
Leader of the Council after election
Conservative

Elections to Salford Borough Council were held on Wednesday, 1 November 1893. One third of the councillors seats were up for election, with each successful candidate to serve a three-year term of office. The Conservative Party gained overall control of the council from no overall control.

== Election result ==
Party	Votes		Seats			Full Council	
Conservative Party	7,746 (52.9%)	▲19.9	10 (62.5%)	10 / 16	▲1	33 (51.6%)	33 / 64
Liberal Party	5,527 (37.8%)	▼15.6	5 (31.3%)	5 / 16	▼2	29 (45.3%)	29 / 64
Independent Labour	0 (0.0%)	N/A	1 (6.3%)	1 / 16	▲1	1 (1.6%)	1 / 64
Independent	0 (0.0%)	▼12.5	0 (0.0%)	0 / 16	Steady	1 (1.6%)	1 / 64
Ind. Labour Party	1,365 (9.3%)	N/A	0 (0.0%)	0 / 16	N/A	0 (0.0%)	0 / 64

=== Full council ===
↓
1	29	1	33

=== Aldermen ===
↓
6	10

=== Councillors ===
↓
1	23	1	23

== Ward results ==
=== Albert Park ===
Albert Park
Party	Candidate	Votes	%	±%
Conservative	R. Holland*	623	50.2	N/A
Liberal	T. Hardy	362	29.1	N/A
Ind. Labour Party	J. Heaviside	257	20.7	N/A
Majority		261	21.1	N/A
Turnout		1,242		
Conservative hold		Swing		

=== Charlestown ===
Charlestown
Party	Candidate	Votes	%	±%
Conservative	T. H. Hardcastle	816	58.1	+21.1
Ind. Labour Party	B. Billcliffe	588	41.9	N/A
Majority		228	16.2	
Turnout		1,404		
Conservative gain from Liberal		Swing		

=== Crescent ===
Crescent
Party	Candidate	Votes	%	±%
Independent Labour	G. T. Jackson	uncontested		
Independent Labour gain from Liberal		Swing		

=== Grosvenor ===
Grosvenor
Party	Candidate	Votes	%	±%
Conservative	I. Frankenburg*	739	49.0	+9.6
Liberal	J. Balmer	461	30.6	−30.0
Ind. Labour Party	F. Barrett	307	20.4	N/A
Majority		278	18.4	
Turnout		1,507		
Conservative gain from Liberal		Swing		

=== Hope ===
Hope
Party	Candidate	Votes	%	±%
Conservative	J. Corney	584	54.2	+2.7
Liberal	J. M. Barrett	493	45.8	−2.7
Majority		91	8.4	+5.4
Turnout		1,077		
Conservative gain from Liberal		Swing		

=== Islington ===
Islington
Party	Candidate	Votes	%	±%
Conservative	J. Griffiths*	926	73.6	+36.6
Conservative	J. E. Middlehurst	333	26.4	−10.6
Majority		593	47.2	
Turnout		1,259		
Conservative hold		Swing		

=== Kersal ===
Kersal
Party	Candidate	Votes	%	±%
Conservative	J. J. Meakin*	uncontested		
Conservative hold		Swing		

=== Ordsall ===
Ordsall
Party	Candidate	Votes	%	±%
Conservative	W. H. Hamblett*	uncontested		
Conservative hold		Swing		

=== Regent ===
Regent
Party	Candidate	Votes	%	±%
Liberal	E. Desquesnes	uncontested		
Liberal gain from Conservative		Swing		

=== St. Matthias' ===
St. Matthias'
Party	Candidate	Votes	%	±%
Conservative	J. Hulton*	1,028	57.2	N/A
Liberal	J. Barnes*	770	42.8	N/A
Majority		258	14.4	N/A
Turnout		1,798		
Conservative hold		Swing		

=== St. Paul's ===
St. Paul's
Party	Candidate	Votes	%	±%
Liberal	E. B. Goulden	628	60.7	+4.4
Conservative	P. C. Gorton	407	39.3	−4.4
Majority		221	21.4	+8.8
Turnout		1,035		
Liberal hold		Swing		

=== St. Thomas' ===
St. Thomas'
Party	Candidate	Votes	%	±%
Liberal	A. Worsley*	390	64.7	+11.5
Ind. Labour Party	T. Goddard	213	35.3	N/A
Majority		177	29.4	+23.0
Turnout		603		
Liberal hold		Swing		

=== Seedley ===
Seedley
Party	Candidate	Votes	%	±%
Liberal	S. Johnson*	614	63.3	−23.6
Conservative	G. Charlton	356	36.7	+23.6
Majority		258	26.6	−47.2
Turnout		970		
Liberal hold		Swing		

=== Trafford ===
Trafford
Party	Candidate	Votes	%	±%
Liberal	G. W. Goodwin	755	58.9	+22.5
Conservative	R. D. Gelder	526	41.1	−6.0
Majority		229	17.8	
Turnout		1,281		
Liberal gain from Conservative		Swing		

=== Trinity ===
Trinity
Party	Candidate	Votes	%	±%
Conservative	J. Snape*	724	65.0	+14.5
Liberal	A. Yates	389	35.0	−14.5
Majority		335	30.0	+29.0
Turnout		1,113		
Conservative hold		Swing		

=== Weaste ===
Weaste
Party	Candidate	Votes	%	±%
Conservative	W. F. Cottrell*	684	50.7	N/A
Liberal	W. Hale	665	49.3	−0.8
Majority		19	1.4	
Turnout		1,349		
Conservative hold		Swing		

== By-elections between 1893 and 1894 ==
=== Weaste, 18 June 1894 ===
Caused by the resignation of Councillor William Foran Cottrell (Conservative, Weaste, elected 1 November 1887) on 6 June 1894.

Weaste
Party	Candidate	Votes	%	±%
Liberal	W. Hale	724	52.8	+3.5
Conservative	J. J. Kay	646	47.2	−3.5
Majority		76	5.6	
Turnout		1,370		
Liberal gain from Conservative		Swing		

=== St. Paul's, 19 September 1894 ===
Caused by the disqualification of Councillor Samuel Bowden (Conservative, St. Paul's, elected 21 June 1893) on 5 September 1894.

St. Paul's
Party	Candidate	Votes	%	±%
Conservative	P. C. Gorton	448	38.8	−0.5
Liberal	J. B. Foden	439	38.0	−22.7
Ind. Labour Party	F. Barrett	268	23.2	N/A
Majority		9	0.8	
Turnout		1,155		
Conservative hold		Swing		
