= 1949 Salford City Council election =

Local election in Salford

- 12 May 1949

17 of 64 seats on Salford City Council 33 seats needed for a majority
	First party	Second party	Third party
Party	Labour	Conservative	Liberal
Last election	8 seats, 47.3%	8 seats, 48.0%	0 seats, 4.3%
Seats before	40	23	1
Seats won	13	4	0
Seats after	41	22	1
Seat change	▲1	▼1	Steady
Popular vote	37,198	34,888	1,876
Percentage	50.2%	47.1%	2.5%
Swing	▲2.9%	▼0.9%	▼2.2%
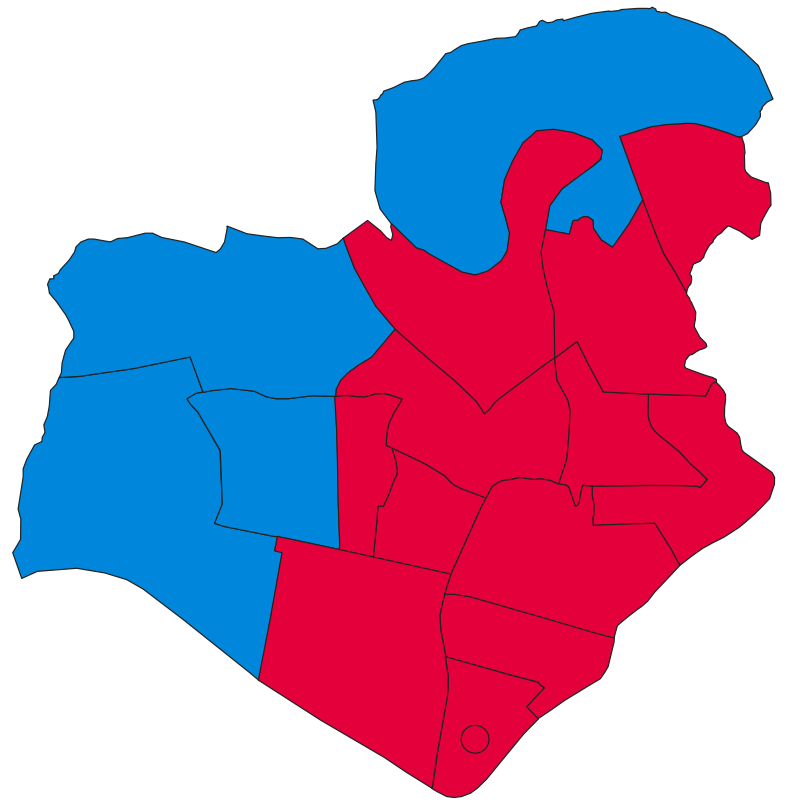
- Map of results of 1949 election
Leader of the Council before election
Labour
Leader of the Council after election
Labour

Elections to Salford City Council were held on Thursday, 12 May 1949. One-third of the councillors seats were up for election, with each successful candidate to serve a three-year term of office. The Labour Party retained overall control of the council.

== Election result ==
Party	Votes		Seats			Full Council	
Labour Party	37,198 (50.2%)	▲2.9	13 (76.5%)	13 / 17	▲1	41 (64.1%)	41 / 64
Conservative Party	34,888 (47.1%)	▼0.9	4 (23.5%)	4 / 17	▼1	22 (34.4%)	22 / 64
Liberal Party	1,876 (2.5%)	▼2.2	0 (0.0%)	0 / 17	Steady	1 (1.6%)	1 / 64
Communist	152 (0.2%)	N/A	0 (0.0%)	0 / 17	N/A	0 (0.0%)	0 / 64

=== Full council ===
↓
41	1	22

=== Aldermen ===
↓
11	1	4

=== Councillors ===
↓
30	18

== Ward results ==
=== Albert Park ===
Albert Park
Party	Candidate	Votes	%	±%
Labour	J. W. Bacon*	3,075	52.3	+7.3
Conservative	J. E. Bedell	2,807	47.7	+4.7
Majority		268	4.6	+2.6
Turnout		5,882		
Labour hold		Swing		

=== Charlestown ===
Charlestown
Party	Candidate	Votes	%	±%
Labour	H. Calderwood*	2,543	54.3	−1.6
Conservative	R. Kenyon	1,990	42.5	−1.6
Communist	E. Grundy	152	3.2	N/A
Majority		553	11.8	0
Turnout		4,685		
Labour hold		Swing		

=== Claremont ===
Claremont
Party	Candidate	Votes	%	±%
Conservative	A. E. Clark*	3,730	56.2	+7.5
Labour	W. Fletcher	1,995	30.1	+0.4
Liberal	M. Royle	910	13.7	−7.9
Majority		1,735	26.1	+7.1
Turnout		6,635		
Conservative hold		Swing		

=== Crescent ===
Crescent
Party	Candidate	Votes	%	±%
Labour	E. E. Mallinson*	1,637	52.8	+2.9
Conservative	J. R. Carter	1,463	47.2	−2.9
Majority		174	5.6	
Turnout		3,100		
Labour hold		Swing		

=== Docks ===
Docks
Party	Candidate	Votes	%	±%
Labour	J. Hall	2,218	58.4	+0.9
Conservative	F. Thompson	1,578	41.6	−0.9
Majority		640	16.8	+1.8
Turnout		3,796		
Labour hold		Swing		

=== Kersal ===
Kersal
Party	Candidate	Votes	%	±%
Conservative	S. B. James*	2,795	62.5	+1.1
Labour	W. J. Emery	1,678	37.5	−1.1
Majority		1,117	25.0	+2.2
Turnout		4,473		
Conservative hold		Swing		

=== Langworthy ===
Langworthy
Party	Candidate	Votes	%	±%
Labour	J. Openshaw*	2,396	54.1	+4.7
Conservative	R. Walling	2,031	45.9	−4.7
Majority		365	8.2	
Turnout		4,427		
Labour hold		Swing		

=== Mandley Park ===
Mandley Park
Party	Candidate	Votes	%	±%
Labour	S. W. Davis	2,455	50.4	+1.0
Conservative	T. J. Keegan*	2,419	49.6	−1.0
Majority		36	0.8	
Turnout		4,874		
Labour gain from Conservative		Swing		

=== Ordsall Park ===
Ordsall Park (2 vacancies)
Party	Candidate	Votes	%	±%
Labour	E. H. Hulse	2,701	63.2	+1.5
Labour	B. Moylan	2,674	62.5	+0.8
Conservative	T. Mason	1,662	38.9	+0.6
Conservative	S. Young	1,512	35.4	−2.9
Majority		1,012	23.7	+0.3
Turnout		4,275		
Labour hold		Swing		
Labour hold		Swing		

=== Regent ===
Regent
Party	Candidate	Votes	%	±%
Labour	T. J. Evason*	2,628	60.3	+5.7
Conservative	J. B. Bebbington	1,732	39.7	−5.7
Majority		896	20.6	+11.4
Turnout		4,360		
Labour hold		Swing		

=== St. Matthias' ===
St. Matthias'
Party	Candidate	Votes	%	±%
Labour	B. Wilson*	2,225	53.1	+2.6
Conservative	W. S. Lappin	1,968	46.9	−2.6
Majority		257	6.2	+5.2
Turnout		4,193		
Labour hold		Swing		

=== St. Paul's ===
St. Paul's
Party	Candidate	Votes	%	±%
Labour	M. C. Whitehead*	1,948	53.6	+3.5
Conservative	W. T. Blakemore	1,687	46.4	−3.5
Majority		261	7.2	+7.0
Turnout		3,635		
Labour hold		Swing		

=== St. Thomas' ===
St. Thomas'
Party	Candidate	Votes	%	±%
Labour	H. Macfarlane*	1,608	53.3	+2.1
Conservative	J. Barnes	1,409	46.7	+7.1
Majority		199	6.6	−5.0
Turnout		3,017		
Labour hold		Swing		

=== Seedley ===
Seedley
Party	Candidate	Votes	%	±%
Conservative	C. J. Townsend*	2,349	51.6	−0.4
Labour	E. Barton	1,897	41.7	−0.2
Liberal	E. Stafford	306	6.7	+1.5
Majority		452	9.9	−0.2
Turnout		4,552		
Conservative hold		Swing		

=== Trinity ===
Trinity
Party	Candidate	Votes	%	±%
Labour	J. Davis*	1,503	50.6	+4.6
Conservative	J. Davies	1,468	49.4	−4.6
Majority		35	1.2	
Turnout		2,971		
Labour hold		Swing		

=== Weaste ===
Weaste
Party	Candidate	Votes	%	±%
Conservative	G. H. Fearnley*	2,288	46.1	−1.3
Labour	N. Openshaw	2,017	40.6	+0.2
Liberal	R. S. Hawkins	660	13.3	+1.1
Majority		271	5.5	−1.5
Turnout		4,965		
Conservative hold		Swing		
