= 1937 Salford City Council election =

Local election in Salford

- 1 November 1937

16 of 64 seats on Salford City Council 33 seats needed for a majority
	First party	Second party	Third party
Party	Labour	Conservative	Independent
Last election	8 seats, 46.0%	7 seats, 45.6%	1 seats, 5.6%
Seats before	30	24	8
Seats won	5	9	2
Seats after	29	26	7
Seat change	▼1	▲2	▼1
Popular vote	19,210	19,442	4,349
Percentage	43.2%	43.8%	9.8%
Swing	▼2.8%	▼1.8%	▲4.2%
	Fourth party
Party	Liberal
Last election	0 seats, 2.8%
Seats before	2
Seats won	0
Seats after	2
Seat change	Steady
Popular vote	1,325
Percentage	3.0%
Swing	▲0.2%
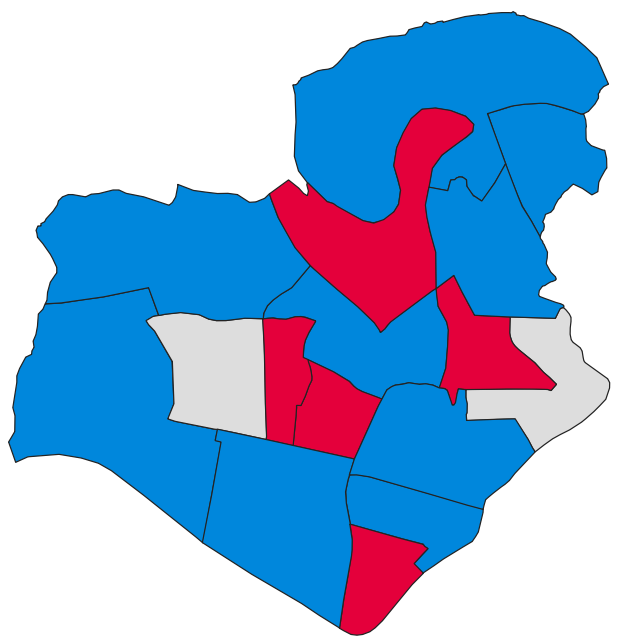
- Map of results of 1937 election
Leader of the Council before election
No overall control
Leader of the Council after election
No overall control

Elections to Salford City Council were held on Monday, 1 November 1937. One-third of the councillors seats were up for election, with each successful candidate to serve a three-year term of office. The council remained under no overall control.

== Election result ==
Party	Votes		Seats			Full Council	
Labour Party	19,210 (43.2%)	▼2.8	5 (31.3%)	5 / 16	▼1	29 (45.3%)	29 / 64
Conservative Party	19,442 (43.8%)	▼1.8	9 (56.3%)	9 / 16	▲2	26 (40.6%)	26 / 64
Independent	4,349 (9.8%)	▲4.2	2 (12.5%)	2 / 16	▼1	7 (10.9%)	7 / 64
Liberal Party	1,325 (3.0%)	▲0.2	0 (0.0%)	0 / 16	Steady	2 (3.1%)	2 / 64
Ind. Labour Party	94 (0.2%)	N/A	0 (0.0%)	0 / 16	N/A	0 (0.0%)	0 / 64

=== Full council ===
↓
29	2	7	26

=== Aldermen ===
↓
9	2	2	3

=== Councillors ===
↓
20	5	23

== Ward results ==
=== Albert Park ===
Albert Park
Party	Candidate	Votes	%	±%
Conservative	H. Bescoby*	1,683	62.5	+3.4
Labour	W. McLoughlin	1,011	37.5	−3.4
Majority		672	25.0	+6.8
Turnout		2,694		
Conservative hold		Swing		

=== Charlestown ===
Charlestown
Party	Candidate	Votes	%	±%
Labour	A. Richardson	1,790	53.0	−2.4
Independent	T. H. Nightingale*	1,491	44.2	N/A
Ind. Labour Party	T. Roach	94	2.8	N/A
Majority		299	8.8	−2.0
Turnout		3,375		
Labour gain from Independent		Swing		

=== Claremont ===
Claremont
Party	Candidate	Votes	%	±%
Conservative	A. F. Carroll	1,533	44.0	−7.2
Liberal	R. Pugh	1,325	38.0	+13.3
Labour	L. Farrelle	625	18.0	−6.1
Majority		608	6.0	−10.5
Turnout		3,483		
Conservative hold		Swing		

=== Crescent ===
Crescent
Party	Candidate	Votes	%	±%
Conservative	J. W. Fieldsend*	1,611	61.1	+8.3
Labour	E. Bowman	1,025	38.9	−8.3
Majority		586	22.2	+16.6
Turnout		2,636		
Conservative hold		Swing		

=== Docks ===
Docks
Party	Candidate	Votes	%	±%
Conservative	F. Morris*	1,639	56.2	−2.1
Labour	R. W. Roskell	1,275	43.8	+2.1
Majority		364	12.4	−4.2
Turnout		2,914		
Conservative hold		Swing		

=== Kersal ===
Kersal
Party	Candidate	Votes	%	±%
Conservative	H. Cobden Turner*	1,580	73.0	+8.5
Labour	E. A. Wilkinson	583	27.0	−8.5
Majority		997	46.0	+17.0
Turnout		2,163		
Conservative hold		Swing		

=== Langworthy ===
Langworthy
Party	Candidate	Votes	%	±%
Labour	R. J. Hurst*	1,456	51.2	+1.8
Conservative	E. W. Bell	1,389	48.8	+2.7
Majority		67	2.4	−0.9
Turnout		2,845		
Labour hold		Swing		

=== Mandley Park ===
Mandley Park
Party	Candidate	Votes	%	±%
Conservative	H. Kitchin*	1,606	52.0	+3.4
Labour	T. C. Loftus	1,481	48.0	−3.4
Majority		125	4.0	
Turnout		3,087		
Conservative hold		Swing		

=== Ordsall Park ===
Ordsall Park
Party	Candidate	Votes	%	±%
Labour	G. H. Goulden*	1,646	52.9	+0.9
Conservative	A. Eccleshall	1,468	47.1	−0.9
Majority		178	5.8	+1.8
Turnout		3,114		
Labour hold		Swing		

=== Regent ===
Regent
Party	Candidate	Votes	%	±%
Conservative	R. Williams	1,744	51.3	+1.0
Labour	E. Cuddeford*	1,657	48.7	−1.0
Majority		87	2.6	+2.0
Turnout		3,401		
Conservative gain from Labour		Swing		

=== St. Matthias' ===
St. Matthias'
Party	Candidate	Votes	%	±%
Labour	H. G. Vale	1,609	54.5	−0.9
Conservative	W. Dalglish	1,346	45.5	+0.9
Majority		263	9.0	−1.8
Turnout		2,955		
Labour hold		Swing		

=== St. Paul's ===
St. Paul's
Party	Candidate	Votes	%	±%
Labour	J. H. Lester*	1,449	53.0	+2.4
Conservative	V. Georgeson	1,286	47.0	+8.3
Majority		163	6.0	−5.9
Turnout		2,735		
Labour hold		Swing		

=== St. Thomas' ===
St. Thomas'
Party	Candidate	Votes	%	±%
Conservative	N. C. Hallam	1,098	50.2	+4.1
Labour	H. Ingle*	1,090	49.8	−4.1
Majority		8	0.4	
Turnout		2,188		
Conservative gain from Labour		Swing		

=== Seedley ===
Seedley
Party	Candidate	Votes	%	±%
Independent	P. Ashcroft*	1,447	62.7	−2.3
Labour	C. S. Robinson	860	37.3	+2.3
Majority		587	25.4	−4.6
Turnout		2,307		
Independent hold		Swing		

=== Trinity ===
Trinity
Party	Candidate	Votes	%	±%
Independent	T. William Richardson*	1,411	63.9	+23.1
Labour	W. Wolfson	798	36.1	−23.1
Majority		613	27.8	
Turnout		2,209		
Independent hold		Swing		

=== Weaste ===
Weaste
Party	Candidate	Votes	%	±%
Conservative	J. Binns*	1,459	63.1	−2.5
Labour	W. H. Cuddeford	855	36.9	+2.5
Majority		604	26.2	−5.0
Turnout		2,314		
Conservative hold		Swing		

== Aldermanic elections ==
=== Aldermanic election, 1 December 1937 ===
Caused by the death on 15 November 1937 of Alderman Ernest Desquesnes (Liberal, elected as an alderman by the council on 6 August 1902).

In his place, Councillor Peter Ashcroft (Independent, Seedley, elected 1 November 1922) was elected as an alderman by the council on 1 December 1937.

Party	Alderman	Ward	Term expires
Independent	Peter Ashcroft		1938

== By-elections between 1937 and 1938 ==
=== Seedley, 16 December 1937 ===
Caused by the election as an alderman of Councillor Peter Ashcroft (Independent, Seedley, elected 1 November 1922) on 1 December 1937, following the death on 15 November 1937 of Alderman Ernest Desquesnes (Liberal, elected as an alderman by the council on 6 August 1902).

Seedley
Party	Candidate	Votes	%	±%
Conservative	E. W. Bell	898	54.2	N/A
Labour	C. S. Robinson	559	33.7	−3.6
Liberal	E. Arrowsmith	200	12.1	N/A
Majority		339	20.5	
Turnout		1,657		
Conservative gain from Independent		Swing		
