= 1951 Salford City Council election =

Local election in Salford

- 10 May 1951

16 of 64 seats on Salford City Council 33 seats needed for a majority
	First party	Second party
Party	Labour	Conservative
Last election	11 seats, 52.6%	6 seats, 47.3%
Seats before	45	19
Seats won	8	8
Seats after	45	19
Seat change	Steady	Steady
Popular vote	27,853	30,718
Percentage	47.5%	52.4%
Swing	▼5.1%	▲5.1%
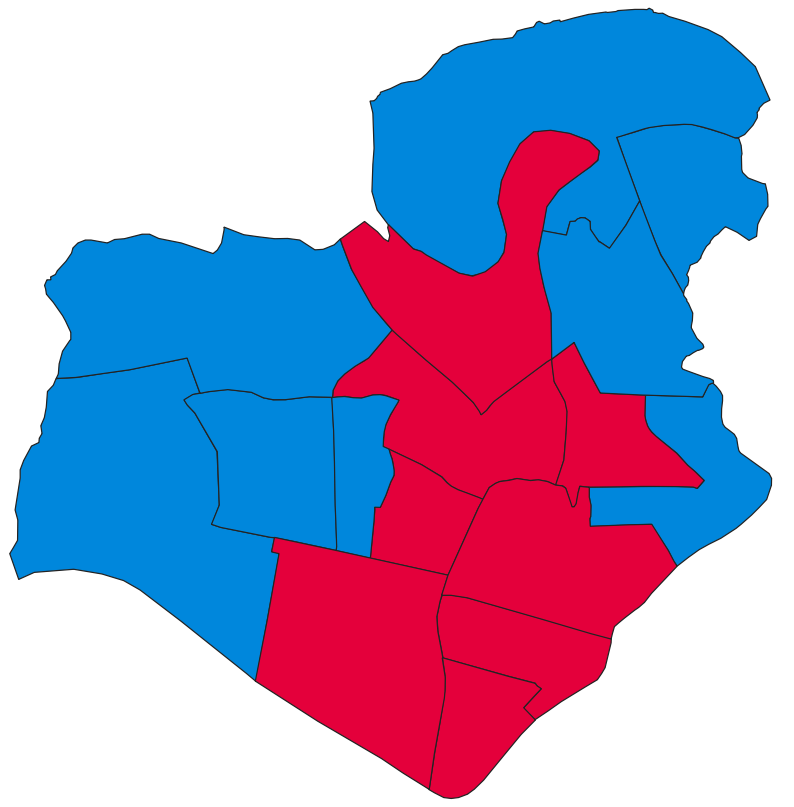
- Map of results of 1951 election
Leader of the Council before election
Labour
Leader of the Council after election
Labour

Elections to Salford City Council were held on Thursday, 10 May 1951. One-third of the councillors seats were up for election, with each successful candidate to serve a three-year term of office. The Labour Party retained overall control of the council.

== Election result ==
Party	Votes		Seats			Full Council	
Labour Party	27,853 (47.5%)	▼5.1	8 (50.0%)	8 / 16	Steady	45 (70.3%)	45 / 64
Conservative Party	30,718 (52.4%)	▲5.1	8 (50.0%)	8 / 16	Steady	19 (29.7%)	19 / 64
Communist	95 (0.1%)	Steady	0 (0.0%)	0 / 16	Steady	0 (0.0%)	0 / 64

=== Full council ===
↓
45	19

=== Aldermen ===
↓
16

=== Councillors ===
↓
29	19

== Ward results ==
=== Albert Park ===
Albert Park
Party	Candidate	Votes	%	±%
Conservative	J. S. Stewart	2,471	50.1	−2.2
Labour	G. D. Franks*	2,470	49.9	+2.2
Majority		1	0.2	
Turnout		4,941		
Conservative gain from Labour		Swing		

=== Charlestown ===
Charlestown
Party	Candidate	Votes	%	±%
Labour	W. White*	1,905	53.2	−8.0
Conservative	H. Smeeton	1,583	44.2	+7.8
Communist	E. Grundy	95	2.6	+0.2
Majority		322	9.0	−15.8
Turnout		3,583		
Labour hold		Swing		

=== Claremont ===
Claremont
Party	Candidate	Votes	%	±%
Conservative	E. A. Parker*	3,664	69.9	+5.2
Labour	H. Hopkinson	1,577	30.1	−5.2
Majority		2,087	39.8	+10.4
Turnout		5,241		
Conservative hold		Swing		

=== Crescent ===
Crescent
Party	Candidate	Votes	%	±%
Labour	A. Jones	1,345	51.4	−5.0
Conservative	N. J. Hockenhull	1,274	48.6	+5.0
Majority		71	2.8	−10.0
Turnout		2,619		
Labour gain from Conservative		Swing		

=== Docks ===
Docks
Party	Candidate	Votes	%	±%
Labour	F. Dewhurst*	1,947	56.5	−5.3
Conservative	J. T. Callison	1,500	43.5	+5.3
Majority		447	13.0	−10.6
Turnout		3,447		
Labour hold		Swing		

=== Kersal ===
Kersal
Party	Candidate	Votes	%	±%
Conservative	T. H. Mellor*	2,593	60.7	+7.1
Labour	F. J. Lynch	1,679	39.3	−7.1
Majority		914	21.4	+14.2
Turnout		4,272		
Conservative hold		Swing		

=== Langworthy ===
Langworthy
Party	Candidate	Votes	%	±%
Conservative	C. R. V. Haynes*	1,955	53.9	+5.7
Labour	F. P. Moran	1,671	46.1	−5.7
Majority		284	7.8	
Turnout		3,626		
Conservative hold		Swing		

=== Mandley Park ===
Mandley Park
Party	Candidate	Votes	%	±%
Conservative	J. Whiteley*	2,706	61.3	+13.7
Labour	P. Grimshaw	1,711	38.7	−13.7
Majority		995	22.6	
Turnout		4,417		
Conservative hold		Swing		

=== Ordsall Park ===
Ordsall Park
Party	Candidate	Votes	%	±%
Labour	W. Petrie*	2,428	63.4	−3.5
Conservative	J. E. Marland	1,403	36.6	+3.5
Majority		1,025	26.8	−7.0
Turnout		3,831		
Labour hold		Swing		

=== Regent ===
Regent
Party	Candidate	Votes	%	±%
Labour	G. C. Goodill*	1,860	53.0	−6.0
Conservative	J. Jackson	1,650	47.0	+6.0
Majority		210	6.0	−12.0
Turnout		3,510		
Labour hold		Swing		

=== St. Matthias' ===
St. Matthias'
Party	Candidate	Votes	%	±%
Labour	W. Fletcher*	1,622	53.8	−1.6
Conservative	G. P. Niddrie	1,393	46.2	+1.6
Majority		229	7.6	−3.2
Turnout		3,015		
Labour hold		Swing		

=== St. Paul's ===
St. Paul's
Party	Candidate	Votes	%	±%
Labour	H. Williams*	1,597	51.9	−6.5
Conservative	J. Livesley	1,481	48.1	+5.4
Majority		116	3.8	−9.8
Turnout		3,078		
Labour hold		Swing		

=== St. Thomas' ===
St. Thomas'
Party	Candidate	Votes	%	±%
Labour	B. Davis*	1,249	53.5	−5.3
Conservative	W. E. Hargreaves	1,084	46.5	+5.3
Majority		165	7.0	−10.6
Turnout		2,333		
Labour hold		Swing		

=== Seedley ===
Seedley
Party	Candidate	Votes	%	±%
Conservative	A. Pendlebury*	2,220	57.0	+5.9
Labour	A. J. Howard	1,676	43.0	−5.9
Majority		544	14.0	+11.8
Turnout		3,896		
Conservative hold		Swing		

=== Trinity ===
Trinity
Party	Candidate	Votes	%	±%
Conservative	C. Brookes*	1,300	52.7	+2.0
Labour	T. W. Thelwell	1,168	47.3	−2.0
Majority		132	5.4	+4.0
Turnout		2,468		
Conservative hold		Swing		

=== Weaste ===
Weaste
Party	Candidate	Votes	%	±%
Conservative	E. Riding	2,441	55.6	+0.4
Labour	E. Warburton	1,948	44.4	−0.4
Majority		493	11.2	+0.8
Turnout		4,389		
Conservative hold		Swing		
