= 1955 Salford City Council election =

Local election in Salford

- 12 May 1955

16 of 64 seats on Salford City Council 33 seats needed for a majority
	First party	Second party
Party	Labour	Conservative
Last election	12 seats, 55.7%	4 seats, 43.2%
Seats before	56	8
Seats won	11	5
Seats after	52	12
Seat change	▼4	▲4
Popular vote	25,283	24,123
Percentage	50.7%	48.3%
Swing	▼5.0%	▲5.1%
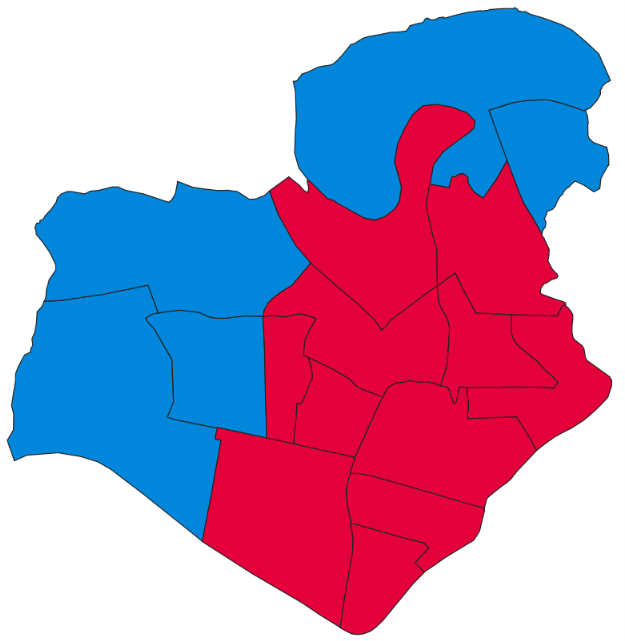
- Map of results of 1955 election
Leader of the Council before election
Labour
Leader of the Council after election
Labour

Elections to Salford City Council were held on Thursday, 12 May 1955. One-third of the councillors seats were up for election, with each successful candidate to serve a three-year term of office. The Labour Party retained overall control of the council.

== Election result ==
Party	Votes		Seats			Full Council	
Labour Party	25,283 (50.7%)	▼5.0	11 (68.8%)	11 / 16	▼4	52 (81.3%)	52 / 64
Conservative Party	24,123 (48.3%)	▲5.1	5 (31.2%)	5 / 16	▲4	12 (18.7%)	12 / 64
Liberal Party	246 (0.5%)	▼0.2	0 (0.0%)	0 / 16	Steady	0 (0.0%)	0 / 64
Communist	229 (0.5%)	▲0.1	0 (0.0%)	0 / 16	Steady	0 (0.0%)	0 / 64

=== Full council ===
↓
52	12

=== Aldermen ===
↓
16

=== Councillors ===
↓
36	12

== Ward results ==
=== Albert Park ===
Albert Park
Party	Candidate	Votes	%	±%
Labour	H. Alvarez*	2,162	53.0	−2.4
Conservative	F. A. Cope	1,921	47.0	+2.4
Majority		241	6.0	−4.8
Turnout		4,083		
Labour hold		Swing		

=== Charlestown ===
Charlestown
Party	Candidate	Votes	%	±%
Labour	H. Calderwood*	1,785	58.0	−2.3
Conservative	V. Hemingway	1,166	37.9	+1.1
Communist	E. Grundy	126	4.1	+1.2
Majority		619	20.1	−3.4
Turnout		3,077		
Labour hold		Swing		

=== Claremont ===
Claremont
Party	Candidate	Votes	%	±%
Conservative	A. E. Clarke*	3,371	66.5	+2.5
Labour	J. Goldberg	1,696	33.5	−2.5
Majority		1,675	33.0	+5.0
Turnout		5,067		
Conservative hold		Swing		

=== Crescent ===
Crescent
Party	Candidate	Votes	%	±%
Labour	R. Wiggins*	1,105	59.8	−5.7
Conservative	L. O. V. Daley	744	40.2	+5.7
Majority		361	19.6	−10.4
Turnout		1,849		
Labour hold		Swing		

=== Docks ===
Docks
Party	Candidate	Votes	%	±%
Labour	J. Hall*	1,605	55.8	−11.0
Conservative	J. Tilby	1,271	44.2	+11.0
Majority		334	11.6	−22.0
Turnout		2,876		
Labour hold		Swing		

=== Kersal ===
Kersal
Party	Candidate	Votes	%	±%
Conservative	H. Bergin	2,359	55.2	−5.7
Labour	G. D. Franks*	1,914	44.8	+5.7
Majority		445	10.4	−11.4
Turnout		4,273		
Conservative gain from Labour		Swing		

=== Langworthy ===
Langworthy
Party	Candidate	Votes	%	±%
Labour	N. Openshaw*	1,550	58.4	+1.5
Conservative	G. Williams	1,105	41.6	+10.8
Majority		445	16.8	−9.3
Turnout		2,655		
Labour hold		Swing		

=== Mandley Park ===
Mandley Park
Party	Candidate	Votes	%	±%
Conservative	J. H. Franks	2,410	52.6	+5.7
Labour	H. Hopkinson*	2,169	47.4	−5.7
Majority		241	5.2	
Turnout		4,579		
Conservative gain from Labour		Swing		

=== Ordsall Park ===
Ordsall Park
Party	Candidate	Votes	%	±%
Labour	W. Neafsey	1,880	63.0	−31.6
Conservative	D. Sheehan	1,001	33.5	N/A
Communist	J. Cohen	103	3.5	−1.9
Majority		879	29.5	−59.7
Turnout		2,984		
Labour hold		Swing		

=== Regent ===
Regent
Party	Candidate	Votes	%	±%
Labour	T. J. Evason*	1,902	64.3	+0.2
Conservative	A. Sacks	1,058	35.7	−0.2
Majority		844	28.6	+0.4
Turnout		2,960		
Labour hold		Swing		

=== St. Matthias' ===
St. Matthias'
Party	Candidate	Votes	%	±%
Labour	B. Wilson*	1,203	59.1	−3.1
Conservative	W. H. Povah	834	40.9	+3.1
Majority		369	18.2	−6.2
Turnout		2,037		
Labour hold		Swing		

=== St. Paul's ===
St. Paul's
Party	Candidate	Votes	%	±%
Labour	G. A. Marshall*	1,295	59.8	−6.8
Conservative	D. M. Angel	872	40.2	+6.8
Majority		423	19.6	−13.6
Turnout		2,167		
Labour hold		Swing		

=== St. Thomas' ===
St. Thomas'
Party	Candidate	Votes	%	±%
Labour	H. Macfarlane*	1,227	56.9	−9.7
Conservative	E. Evans	929	43.1	+9.7
Majority		298	13.8	−19.4
Turnout		2,156		
Labour hold		Swing		

=== Seedley ===
Seedley
Party	Candidate	Votes	%	±%
Conservative	M. Pendlebury	1,697	53.9	−1.6
Labour	M. Ferguson*	1,204	38.3	−6.2
Liberal	A. E. Lee	246	7.8	N/A
Majority		493	15.6	+4.6
Turnout		3,147		
Conservative gain from Labour		Swing		

=== Trinity ===
Trinity
Party	Candidate	Votes	%	±%
Labour	I. Davies*	985	53.0	−6.5
Conservative	J. H. Winder	872	47.0	+6.5
Majority		113	6.0	−13.0
Turnout		1,857		
Labour hold		Swing		

=== Weaste ===
Weaste
Party	Candidate	Votes	%	±%
Conservative	G. Bellamy	2,513	61.1	+8.6
Labour	N. B. Capindale*	1,601	38.9	−8.6
Majority		912	22.2	+17.2
Turnout		4,114		
Conservative gain from Labour		Swing		
