= 1957 Salford City Council election =

Local election in Salford

- 9 May 1957

16 of 64 seats on Salford City Council 33 seats needed for a majority
	First party	Second party
Party	Labour	Conservative
Last election	13 seats, 57.3%	3 seats, 40.1%
Seats before	52	12
Seats won	14	2
Seats after	54	10
Seat change	▲2	▼2
Popular vote	21,477	13,435
Percentage	55.3%	34.6%
Swing	▼2.0%	▼5.5%
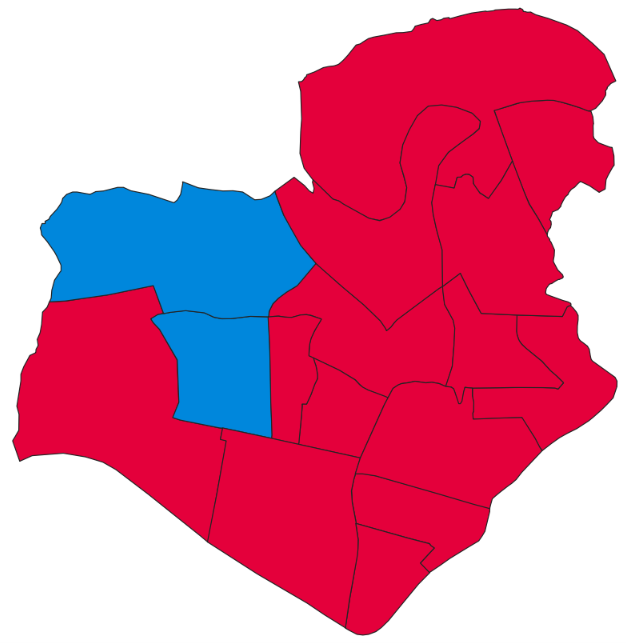
- Map of results of 1957 election
Leader of the Council before election
Labour
Leader of the Council after election
Labour

Elections to Salford City Council were held on Thursday, 9 May 1957. One-third of the councillors seats were up for election, with each successful candidate to serve a three-year term of office. The Labour Party retained overall control of the council.

== Election result ==
Party	Votes		Seats			Full Council	
Labour Party	21,477 (55.3%)	▼2.0	14 (87.5%)	14 / 16	▲2	54 (84.4%)	54 / 64
Conservative Party	13,435 (34.6%)	▼5.5	2 (12.5%)	2 / 16	▼2	10 (15.6%)	10 / 64
Liberal Party	3,711 (9.6%)	▲7.6	0 (0.0%)	0 / 16	Steady	0 (0.0%)	0 / 64
Communist	216 (0.6%)	▼0.1	0 (0.0%)	0 / 16	Steady	0 (0.0%)	0 / 64

=== Full council ===
↓
54	10

=== Aldermen ===
↓
16

=== Councillors ===
↓
38	10

== Ward results ==
=== Albert Park ===
Albert Park
Party	Candidate	Votes	%	±%
Labour	H. McFarlane*	2,162	66.1	+5.1
Conservative	A. Sacks	1,111	33.9	−5.1
Majority		1,051	32.2	+10.2
Turnout		3,273		
Labour hold		Swing		

=== Charlestown ===
Charlestown
Party	Candidate	Votes	%	±%
Labour	W. White*	1,504	63.1	+1.7
Conservative	S. Cooper	566	23.7	−10.5
Liberal	V. W. Livesey	202	8.5	N/A
Communist	J. Billington	113	4.7	+0.3
Majority		938	39.4	+12.2
Turnout		2,385		
Labour hold		Swing		

=== Claremont ===
Claremont
Party	Candidate	Votes	%	±%
Conservative	G. M. Joplin	1,820	51.8	−13.2
Liberal	J. Percival	1,693	48.2	N/A
Majority		127	3.6	−26.4
Turnout		3,513		
Conservative hold		Swing		

=== Crescent ===
Crescent
Party	Candidate	Votes	%	±%
Labour	A. Jones*	1,034	73.5	+8.4
Conservative	W. H. Povah	373	26.5	−8.4
Majority		661	47.0	+16.8
Turnout		1,407		
Labour hold		Swing		

=== Docks ===
Docks
Party	Candidate	Votes	%	±%
Labour	F. Dewhurst*	1,328	72.9	+5.3
Liberal	N. D. Allman	494	27.1	N/A
Majority		834	45.8	+10.6
Turnout		1,822		
Labour hold		Swing		

=== Kersal ===
Kersal
Party	Candidate	Votes	%	±%
Labour	G. D. Franks	2,154	51.2	−5.8
Conservative	T. H. Mellor*	2,053	48.8	+5.8
Majority		101	2.4	−11.6
Turnout		4,207		
Labour gain from Conservative		Swing		

=== Langworthy ===
Langworthy
Party	Candidate	Votes	%	±%
Labour	J. Hill*	1,209	60.0	+1.8
Conservative	N. H. Maxwell	570	28.3	−4.0
Liberal	A. E. Lee	235	11.7	+2.3
Majority		639	31.7	+5.7
Turnout		2,014		
Labour hold		Swing		

=== Mandley Park ===
Mandley Park
Party	Candidate	Votes	%	±%
Labour	S. Davies*	2,209	57.6	+0.7
Conservative	J. J. McGough	1,629	42.4	−0.7
Majority		580	15.2	+1.4
Turnout		3,838		
Labour hold		Swing		

=== Ordsall Park ===
Ordsall Park
Party	Candidate	Votes	%	±%
Labour	I. Zott	1,515	93.6	+2.1
Communist	J. Cohen	103	6.4	−2.1
Majority		1,412	87.2	+4.2
Turnout		1,618		
Labour hold		Swing		

=== Regent ===
Regent
Party	Candidate	Votes	%	±%
Labour	L. F. Mossom*	1,378	73.4	+3.9
Conservative	E. Fenton	500	26.6	−3.9
Majority		878	46.8	+7.8
Turnout		1,878		
Labour hold		Swing		

=== St. Matthias' ===
St. Matthias'
Party	Candidate	Votes	%	±%
Labour	W. Fletcher*	964	68.3	+2.5
Conservative	A. Eccleshall	448	31.7	−2.5
Majority		516	36.6	+5.0
Turnout		1,412		
Labour hold		Swing		

=== St. Paul's ===
St. Paul's
Party	Candidate	Votes	%	±%
Labour	H. Williams*	1,379	69.9	+2.9
Conservative	J. R. Courtney	457	23.2	−2.6
Liberal	O. M. Hill	137	6.9	−0.3
Majority		922	46.7	+5.5
Turnout		1,973		
Labour hold		Swing		

=== St. Thomas' ===
St. Thomas'
Party	Candidate	Votes	%	±%
Labour	B. Davis*	878	62.6	N/A
Conservative	D. M. Angel	277	19.7	N/A
Liberal	K. Davies	248	17.7	N/A
Majority		601	42.9	N/A
Turnout		1,403		
Labour hold		Swing		

=== Seedley ===
Seedley
Party	Candidate	Votes	%	±%
Conservative	E. Riding*	1,291	45.2	−0.5
Labour	F. I. Hartley	1,255	43.9	+6.4
Liberal	A. H. Hill	310	10.9	−5.9
Majority		36	1.3	−6.9
Turnout		2,856		
Conservative hold		Swing		

=== Trinity ===
Trinity
Party	Candidate	Votes	%	±%
Labour	M. Flanagan*	795	53.6	−1.4
Conservative	D. Sheehan	687	46.4	+1.4
Majority		108	7.2	−2.8
Turnout		1,483		
Labour hold		Swing		

=== Weaste ===
Weaste
Party	Candidate	Votes	%	±%
Labour	B. Wallsworth	1,713	45.6	+0.4
Conservative	J. Tilby	1,653	44.0	−10.8
Liberal	J. A. Cooper	392	10.4	N/A
Majority		60	1.6	
Turnout		3,758		
Labour gain from Conservative		Swing		
