= 1965 Salford City Council election =

Local election in Salford

- 13 May 1965

16 of 64 seats on Salford City Council 33 seats needed for a majority
	First party	Second party	Third party
Party	Labour	Conservative	Liberal
Last election	11 seats, 53.8%	4 seats, 40.2%	1 seat, 4.5%
Seats before	52	9	3
Seats won	11	4	1
Seats after	49	12	3
Seat change	▼3	▲3	Steady
Popular vote	12,325	11,291	1,532
Percentage	48.5%	44.4%	6.0%
Swing	▼5.3%	▲4.2%	▲1.5%
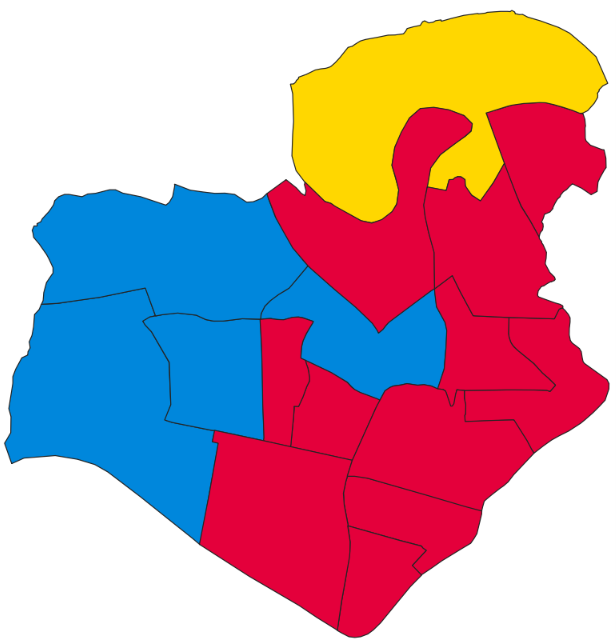
- Map of results of 1965 election
Leader of the Council before election
Labour
Leader of the Council after election
Labour

Elections to Salford City Council were held on Thursday, 13 May 1965. One-third of the councillors seats were up for election, with each successful candidate to serve a three-year term of office. The Labour Party retained overall control of the council.

== Election result ==
Party	Votes		Seats			Full Council	
Labour Party	12,325 (48.5%)	▼5.3	11 (68.8%)	11 / 16	▼3	49 (76.6%)	49 / 64
Conservative Party	11,291 (44.4%)	▲4.2	4 (25.0%)	4 / 16	▲3	12 (18.8%)	12 / 64
Liberal Party	1,532 (6.0%)	▲1.5	1 (6.3%)	1 / 16	Steady	3 (4.7%)	3 / 64
Communist	254 (1.0%)	▼0.4	0 (0.0%)	0 / 16	Steady	0 (0.0%)	0 / 64

=== Full council ===
↓
49	3	12

=== Aldermen ===
↓
16

=== Councillors ===
↓
33	3	12

== Ward results ==
=== Albert Park ===
Albert Park
Party	Candidate	Votes	%	±%
Labour	J. Bryans*	1,335	62.3	−5.2
Conservative	A. Boardman	808	37.7	+5.2
Majority		527	24.6	−10.4
Turnout		2,143		
Labour hold		Swing		

=== Charlestown ===
Charlestown
Party	Candidate	Votes	%	±%
Labour	E. Hough*	uncontested		
Labour hold		Swing		

=== Claremont ===
Claremont
Party	Candidate	Votes	%	±%
Conservative	V. Hemingway*	2,586	69.8	+3.5
Labour	M. Hopkinson	1,117	30.2	−3.5
Majority		1,469	39.6	+7.0
Turnout		3,703		
Conservative hold		Swing		

=== Crescent ===
Crescent
Party	Candidate	Votes	%	±%
Labour	H. Cowin*	288	61.4	−8.8
Conservative	B. Baxter	181	38.6	+8.8
Majority		107	22.8	−17.6
Turnout		469		
Labour hold		Swing		

=== Docks ===
Docks
Party	Candidate	Votes	%	±%
Labour	L. Hough*	685	53.4	−8.8
Conservative	J. Harrup	513	40.0	+7.7
Communist	T. A. Bentley	84	6.6	+1.1
Majority		172	13.4	−16.5
Turnout		1,282		
Labour hold		Swing		

=== Kersal ===
Kersal
Party	Candidate	Votes	%	±%
Liberal	M. Corwin*	1,532	49.3	+8.0
Labour	W. Brown	833	26.8	−6.4
Conservative	N. Sweeney	742	23.9	−1.6
Majority		699	22.5	+14.4
Turnout		3,107		
Liberal hold		Swing		

=== Langworthy ===
Langworthy
Party	Candidate	Votes	%	±%
Labour	B. Wallsworth*	910	54.2	−11.6
Conservative	B. E. Bradbury	769	45.8	+14.5
Majority		141	8.4	−26.1
Turnout		1,679		
Labour hold		Swing		

=== Mandley Park ===
Mandley Park
Party	Candidate	Votes	%	±%
Labour	T. J. A. Harding*	1,379	65.9	+19.1
Conservative	P. Pessagno	714	34.1	−19.1
Majority		665	31.8	
Turnout		2,093		
Labour hold		Swing		

=== Ordsall Park ===
Ordsall Park
Party	Candidate	Votes	%	±%
Labour	J. V. Fairbrother*	731	85.9	+7.0
Communist	A. Moore	120	14.1	+6.6
Majority		611	71.8	+6.5
Turnout		851		
Labour hold		Swing		

=== Regent ===
Regent
Party	Candidate	Votes	%	±%
Labour	M. Jackson*	795	65.6	−6.6
Conservative	J. Bradbury	366	30.2	+9.0
Communist	T. Keenan	50	4.2	−2.4
Majority		429	35.4	−15.6
Turnout		1,211		
Labour hold		Swing		

=== St. Matthias' ===
St. Matthias'
Party	Candidate	Votes	%	±%
Labour	J. G. Williams*	930	68.0	−1.1
Conservative	A. Sacks	437	32.0	+1.1
Majority		493	36.0	−2.2
Turnout		1,367		
Labour hold		Swing		

=== St. Paul's ===
St. Paul's
Party	Candidate	Votes	%	±%
Labour	G. D. Franks*	uncontested		
Labour hold		Swing		

=== St. Thomas' ===
St. Thomas'
Party	Candidate	Votes	%	±%
Conservative	S. Cooper	380	53.5	+18.6
Labour	N. Wright*	330	46.5	−18.6
Majority		50	7.0	
Turnout		710		
Conservative gain from Labour		Swing		

=== Seedley ===
Seedley
Party	Candidate	Votes	%	±%
Conservative	B. Nolan	1,556	57.7	+6.0
Labour	A. C. Casson*	1,140	42.3	−6.0
Majority		416	15.4	+12.0
Turnout		2,696		
Conservative gain from Labour		Swing		

=== Trinity ===
Trinity
Party	Candidate	Votes	%	±%
Labour	J. R. Jaffe*	522	51.0	−6.4
Conservative	R. Jennings	501	49.0	+6.4
Majority		21	2.0	−12.8
Turnout		1,023		
Labour hold		Swing		

=== Weaste ===
Weaste
Party	Candidate	Votes	%	±%
Conservative	W. H. Parker	1,738	56.6	+4.6
Labour	B. K. Lappin*	1,330	43.4	−4.6
Majority		408	13.2	+9.2
Turnout		3,068		
Conservative gain from Labour		Swing		
