= 1972 Salford City Council election =

Local election in Salford

- 4 May 1972

16 of 64 seats on Salford City Council 33 seats needed for a majority
	First party	Second party	Third party
Party	Labour	Conservative	Liberal
Last election	16 seats, 64.7%	1 seat, 32.6%	0 seats, 2.7%
Seats before	29	31	3
Seats won	14	2	0
Seats after	40	22	1
Seat change	▲11	▼9	▼2
Popular vote	18,064	10,488	1,083
Percentage	60.7%	35.2%	3.6%
Swing	▼4.0%	▲2.6%	▲0.9%
	Fourth party
Party	Independent Labour
Last election	0 seats, 0.0%
Seats before	1
Seats won	0
Seats after	1
Seat change	Steady
Popular vote	0
Percentage	0.0%
Swing	Steady
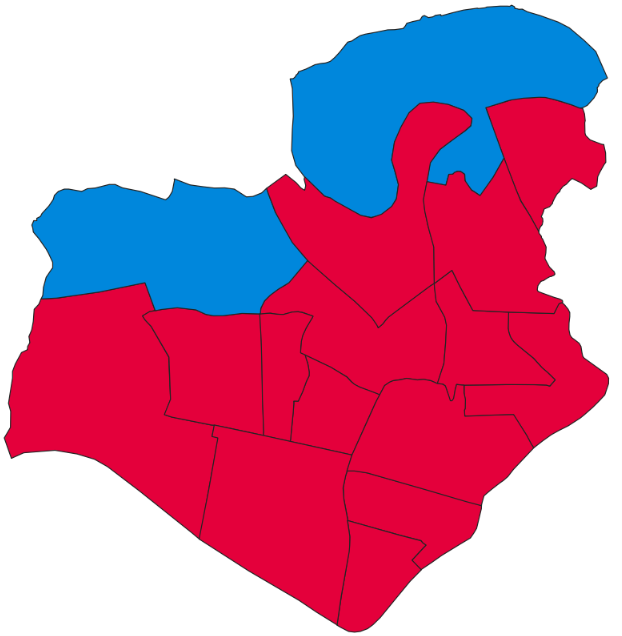
- Map of results of 1971 election
Leader of the Council before election
No overall control
Leader of the Council after election
Labour

Elections to Salford City Council were held on Thursday, 4 May 1972. One-third of the councillors seats were up for election, with each successful candidate to serve a three-year term of office. The Labour Party gained overall control of the council from no overall control.

== Election result ==
Party	Votes		Seats			Full Council	
Labour Party	18,064 (60.7%)	▼4.0	14 (87.5%)	14 / 16	▲11	40 (62.5%)	40 / 64
Conservative Party	10,488 (35.2%)	▲2.6	2 (12.5%)	2 / 16	▼9	22 (34.4%)	22 / 64
Liberal Party	1,083 (3.6%)	▲0.9	0 (0.0%)	0 / 16	▼2	1 (1.6%)	1 / 64
Independent Labour	0 (0.0%)	Steady	0 (0.0%)	0 / 16	Steady	1 (1.6%)	1 / 64
Communist	132 (0.4%)	N/A	0 (0.0%)	0 / 16	N/A	0 (0.0%)	0 / 64

=== Full council ===
↓
40	1	1	22

=== Aldermen ===
↓
1	15

=== Councillors ===
↓
40	1	7

== Ward results ==
=== Albert Park ===
Albert Park
Party	Candidate	Votes	%	±%
Labour	R. Dodd	1,724	67.9	−0.8
Conservative	F. Ford	816	32.1	+0.8
Majority		908	35.8	−1.6
Turnout		2,540		
Labour gain from Conservative		Swing		

=== Charlestown ===
Charlestown
Party	Candidate	Votes	%	±%
Labour	J. H. Hodgkiss	723	68.2	+4.8
Conservative	R. Allport	337	31.8	+12.6
Majority		386	36.4	−7.8
Turnout		1,060		
Labour gain from Liberal		Swing		

=== Claremont ===
Claremont
Party	Candidate	Votes	%	±%
Conservative	S. Brierley	1,941	62.9	+6.2
Labour	F. Taylor	1,147	37.1	−6.2
Majority		794	25.8	+12.4
Turnout		3,088		
Conservative hold		Swing		

=== Crescent ===
Crescent
Party	Candidate	Votes	%	±%
Labour	A. Mort	483	50.4	−2.0
Liberal	D. I. Conway	475	49.6	+12.6
Majority		8	0.8	−14.6
Turnout		958		
Labour gain from Liberal		Swing		

=== Docks ===
Docks
Party	Candidate	Votes	%	±%
Labour	B. P. Murphy	1,128	52.6	−18.4
Liberal	J. Whittaker	608	28.4	N/A
Conservative	G. Malvern	408	19.0	−10.0
Majority		520	24.2	−17.8
Turnout		2,144		
Labour gain from Conservative		Swing		

=== Kersal ===
Kersal
Party	Candidate	Votes	%	±%
Conservative	R. Heron*	1,686	48.9	+5.2
Labour	S. Paul	1,627	47.2	−9.1
Communist	J. A. Brogan	132	3.9	N/A
Majority		59	1.7	
Turnout		3,445		
Conservative hold		Swing		

=== Langworthy ===
Langworthy
Party	Candidate	Votes	%	±%
Labour	P. R. Duffy	992	68.3	−2.4
Conservative	L. B. Scott	461	21.7	+2.4
Majority		531	36.6	−4.8
Turnout		1,453		
Labour gain from Conservative		Swing		

=== Mandley Park ===
Mandley Park
Party	Candidate	Votes	%	±%
Labour	L. Cooke*	1,624	61.4	−2.0
Conservative	M. Pollard	1,020	38.6	+2.0
Majority		604	22.8	−4.0
Turnout		2,644		
Labour hold		Swing		

=== Ordsall Park ===
Ordsall Park
Party	Candidate	Votes	%	±%
Labour	I. Zott*	787	80.7	+8.0
Conservative	R. T. Edwards	188	19.3	+4.2
Majority		599	61.4	+3.8
Turnout		975		
Labour hold		Swing		

=== Regent ===
Regent
Party	Candidate	Votes	%	±%
Labour	J. R. Jaffe*	778	86.1	+8.6
Conservative	B. Strickland	126	13.9	−10.4
Majority		652	72.2	+20.8
Turnout		904		
Labour hold		Swing		

=== St. Matthias' ===
St. Matthias'
Party	Candidate	Votes	%	±%
Labour	J. N. Spencer	830	64.3	−2.8
Conservative	J. Bradbury*	461	35.7	+7.9
Majority		369	28.6	−10.7
Turnout		1,291		
Labour gain from Conservative		Swing		

=== St. Paul's ===
St. Paul's
Party	Candidate	Votes	%	±%
Labour	G. Wilcock	1,409	84.2	+4.7
Conservative	J. Burke	265	15.8	−4.7
Majority		1,144	68.4	+9.4
Turnout		1,674		
Labour gain from Conservative		Swing		

=== St. Thomas' ===
St. Thomas'
Party	Candidate	Votes	%	±%
Labour	J. R. Thomas	875	85.2	+16.3
Conservative	E. Duffy	152	14.8	−16.3
Majority		723	70.4	+32.6
Turnout		1,027		
Labour gain from Conservative		Swing		

=== Seedley ===
Seedley
Party	Candidate	Votes	%	±%
Labour	G. Leech	1,334	50.1	−8.9
Conservative	S. Cooper	1,328	49.9	+8.9
Majority		6	0.2	−17.8
Turnout		2,662		
Labour gain from Conservative		Swing		

=== Trinity ===
Trinity
Party	Candidate	Votes	%	±%
Labour	J. Warren	738	71.8	+4.0
Conservative	R. Jennings*	290	28.2	−3.0
Majority		448	43.6	+6.0
Turnout		1,028		
Labour gain from Conservative		Swing		

=== Weaste ===
Weaste
Party	Candidate	Votes	%	±%
Labour	R. J. M. Openshaw	1,865	64.9	−1.3
Conservative	W. T. Tyrer*	1,009	35.1	+1.3
Majority		856	29.8	−2.6
Turnout		2,874		
Labour gain from Conservative		Swing		
