= 1950 Salford City Council election =

Local election in Salford

- 11 May 1950

17 of 64 seats on Salford City Council 33 seats needed for a majority
	First party	Second party
Party	Labour	Conservative
Last election	13 seats, 50.2%	4 seats, 47.1%
Seats before	45	19
Seats won	11	6
Seats after	45	19
Seat change	Steady	Steady
Popular vote	33,828	30,434
Percentage	52.6%	47.3%
Swing	▲2.4%	▲0.2%
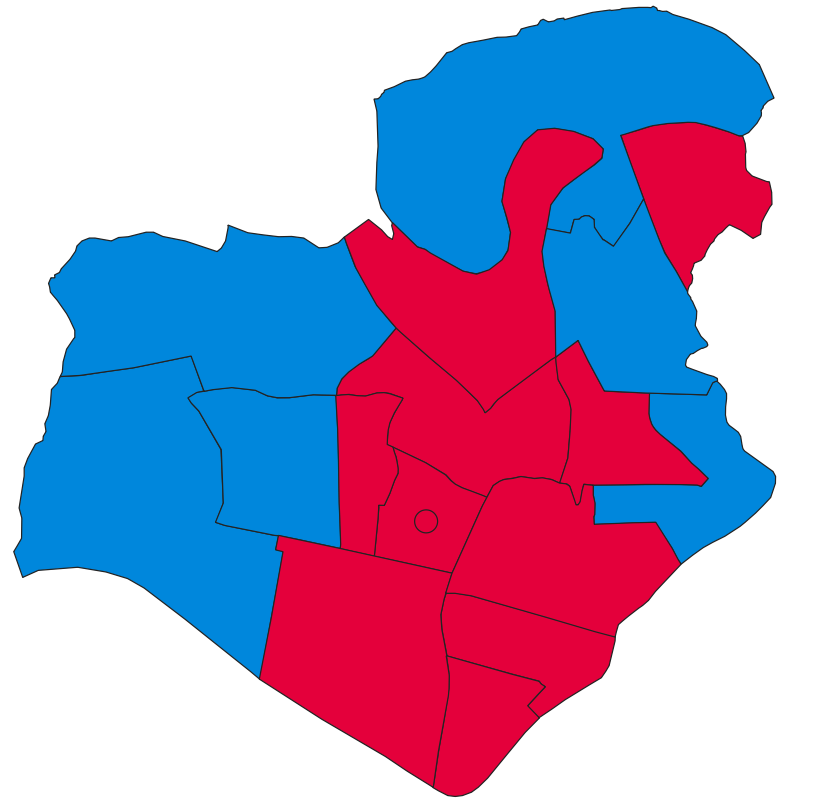
- Map of results of 1950 election
Leader of the Council before election
Labour
Leader of the Council after election
Labour

Elections to Salford City Council were held on Thursday, 11 May 1950. One-third of the councillors seats were up for election, with each successful candidate to serve a three-year term of office. The Labour Party retained overall control of the council.

== Election result ==
Party	Votes		Seats			Full Council	
Labour Party	33,828 (52.6%)	▲2.4	11 (64.7%)	11 / 17	Steady	45 (70.3%)	45 / 64
Conservative Party	30,434 (47.3%)	▲0.2	6 (35.3%)	6 / 17	Steady	19 (29.7%)	19 / 64
Communist	88 (0.1%)	▼0.1	0 (0.0%)	0 / 17	Steady	0 (0.0%)	0 / 64

=== Full council ===
↓
45	19

=== Aldermen ===
↓
16

=== Councillors ===
↓
29	19

== Ward results ==
=== Albert Park ===
Albert Park
Party	Candidate	Votes	%	±%
Conservative	T. Clarke*	2,667	52.3	+4.6
Labour	F. P. Moran	2,432	47.7	−4.6
Majority		235	4.6	
Turnout		5,099		
Conservative hold		Swing		

=== Charlestown ===
Charlestown
Party	Candidate	Votes	%	±%
Labour	J. Hardman*	2,264	61.2	+6.9
Conservative	W. E. Hargreaves	1,347	36.4	−6.1
Communist	E. Grundy	88	2.4	−0.8
Majority		917	24.8	+13.0
Turnout		3,699		
Labour hold		Swing		

=== Claremont ===
Claremont
Party	Candidate	Votes	%	±%
Conservative	A. F. Carroll*	3,561	64.7	+8.5
Labour	N. Wright	1,943	35.3	+5.2
Majority		1,618	29.4	+3.3
Turnout		5,504		
Conservative hold		Swing		

=== Crescent ===
Crescent
Party	Candidate	Votes	%	±%
Labour	S. C. Hamburger*	1,610	56.4	+3.6
Conservative	J. Midgley	1,244	43.6	−3.6
Majority		366	12.8	+7.2
Turnout		2,854		
Labour hold		Swing		

=== Docks ===
Docks
Party	Candidate	Votes	%	±%
Labour	B. Burchill*	2,107	61.8	+3.4
Conservative	A. Woods	1,304	38.2	−3.4
Majority		803	23.6	+6.8
Turnout		3,411		
Labour hold		Swing		

=== Kersal ===
Kersal
Party	Candidate	Votes	%	±%
Conservative	H. Cobden Turner*	2,287	53.6	−8.9
Labour	W. J. Emery	1,980	46.4	+8.9
Majority		307	7.2	−17.8
Turnout		4,267		
Conservative hold		Swing		

=== Langworthy ===
Langworthy
Party	Candidate	Votes	%	±%
Labour	F. M. Marron*	1,917	51.8	−2.3
Conservative	R. Walling	1,787	48.2	+2.3
Majority		130	3.6	−4.6
Turnout		3,704		
Labour hold		Swing		

=== Mandley Park ===
Mandley Park
Party	Candidate	Votes	%	±%
Labour	E. M. Cooper*	2,658	52.4	+2.0
Conservative	J. E. Bedell	2,414	47.6	−2.0
Majority		244	4.8	+4.0
Turnout		5,072		
Labour hold		Swing		

=== Ordsall Park ===
Ordsall Park
Party	Candidate	Votes	%	±%
Labour	B. Moylan*	2,502	66.9	+3.7
Conservative	R. Stones	1,240	33.1	−5.8
Majority		1,262	33.8	+11.1
Turnout		3,742		
Labour hold		Swing		

=== Regent ===
Regent
Party	Candidate	Votes	%	±%
Labour	E. Moreton*	2,156	59.0	−1.3
Conservative	J. Jackson	1,501	41.0	+1.3
Majority		655	18.0	−2.6
Turnout		3,657		
Labour hold		Swing		

=== St. Matthias' ===
St. Matthias'
Party	Candidate	Votes	%	±%
Labour	C. Bramall*	1,793	55.4	+2.3
Conservative	H. H. Hutchinson	1,446	44.6	−2.3
Majority		347	10.8	+4.6
Turnout		3,239		
Labour hold		Swing		

=== St. Paul's ===
St. Paul's (2 vacancies)
Party	Candidate	Votes	%	±%
Labour	T. A. Barton*	1,905	58.4	+4.8
Labour	G. A. Marshall	1,837	56.3	+2.7
Conservative	D. Harrison	1,394	42.7	−3.7
Conservative	J. Davies	1,392	42.6	−3.8
Majority		443	13.6	+6.4
Turnout		3,264		
Labour hold		Swing		
Labour hold		Swing		

=== St. Thomas' ===
St. Thomas'
Party	Candidate	Votes	%	±%
Labour	R. Sharp*	1,536	58.8	+5.5
Conservative	J. Barnes	1,078	41.2	−5.5
Majority		458	17.6	+11.0
Turnout		2,614		
Labour hold		Swing		

=== Seedley ===
Seedley
Party	Candidate	Votes	%	±%
Conservative	E. W. Bell*	1,992	51.1	−0.5
Labour	A. J. Howard	1,904	48.9	+7.2
Majority		88	2.2	−7.7
Turnout		3,896		
Conservative hold		Swing		

=== Trinity ===
Trinity
Party	Candidate	Votes	%	±%
Conservative	M. E. Butler*	1,361	50.7	+1.3
Labour	T. W. Thelwell	1,321	49.3	−1.3
Majority		40	1.4	
Turnout		2,682		
Conservative hold		Swing		

=== Weaste ===
Weaste
Party	Candidate	Votes	%	±%
Conservative	A. G. Wild*	2,419	55.2	+9.1
Labour	A. Jones	1,963	44.8	+4.2
Majority		456	10.4	+4.9
Turnout		4,382		
Conservative hold		Swing		
