= 1970 Salford City Council election =

Local election in Salford

- 7 May 1970

16 of 64 seats on Salford City Council 33 seats needed for a majority
	First party	Second party	Third party
Party	Conservative	Labour	Liberal
Last election	12 seats, 54.7%	2 seats, 35.4%	2 seats, 9.9%
Seats before	47	14	3
Seats won	5	10	1
Seats after	40	21	3
Seat change	▼7	▲7	Steady
Popular vote	14,550	15,125	2,362
Percentage	45.4%	47.2%	7.4%
Swing	▼9.3%	▲11.8%	▼2.5%
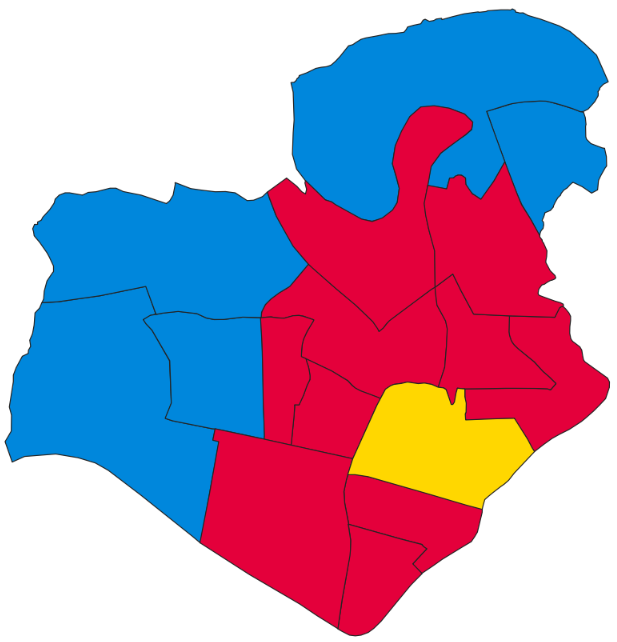
- Map of results of 1970 election
Leader of the Council before election
Conservative
Leader of the Council after election
Conservative

Elections to Salford City Council were held on Thursday, 7 May 1970. One-third of the councillors seats were up for election, with each successful candidate to serve a three-year term of office. The Conservative Party retained overall control of the council.

== Election result ==
Party	Votes		Seats			Full Council	
Conservative Party	14,550 (45.4%)	▼9.3	5 (31.3%)	5 / 16	▼7	40 (62.5%)	40 / 64
Labour Party	15,125 (47.2%)	▲11.8	10 (62.5%)	10 / 16	▲7	21 (32.8%)	21 / 64
Liberal Party	2,362 (7.4%)	▼2.5	1 (6.3%)	1 / 16	Steady	3 (4.7%)	3 / 64

=== Full council ===
↓
21	3	40

=== Aldermen ===
↓
8	8

=== Councillors ===
↓
13	3	39

== Ward results ==
=== Albert Park ===
Albert Park
Party	Candidate	Votes	%	±%
Labour	J. Bryans	1,768	61.3	+14.3
Conservative	E. Heaps	1,118	38.7	−14.3
Majority		650	22.6	
Turnout		2,886		
Labour gain from Conservative		Swing		

=== Charlestown ===
Charlestown
Party	Candidate	Votes	%	±%
Labour	L. Hough	884	47.0	+14.9
Liberal	N. Trainor	521	27.7	−8.2
Conservative	G. B. Swinburn*	476	25.3	−6.7
Majority		363	19.3	
Turnout		1,881		
Labour gain from Conservative		Swing		

=== Claremont ===
Claremont
Party	Candidate	Votes	%	±%
Conservative	E. Duffy	2,242	70.4	−8.0
Labour	B. L. Grimshaw	942	29.6	+8.0
Majority		1,300	40.8	−16.0
Turnout		3,184		
Conservative hold		Swing		

=== Crescent ===
Crescent
Party	Candidate	Votes	%	±%
Liberal	P. J. Fenlon*	441	51.9	+1.8
Labour	B. Wallsworth	276	32.5	+9.0
Conservative	W. Johnston	132	15.6	−11.8
Majority		165	19.4	−2.3
Turnout		849		
Liberal hold		Swing		

=== Docks ===
Docks
Party	Candidate	Votes	%	±%
Labour	T. C. Loftus	1,216	56.1	+15.7
Conservative	W. Eddes*	952	43.9	−15.7
Majority		264	12.2	
Turnout		2,168		
Labour gain from Conservative		Swing		

=== Kersal ===
Kersal
Party	Candidate	Votes	%	±%
Conservative	G. Roth	1,742	51.2	+6.0
Labour	E. Hough	899	26.4	+10.1
Liberal	G. Harris	760	22.4	−16.1
Majority		843	24.8	+18.1
Turnout		3,401		
Conservative hold		Swing		

=== Langworthy ===
Langworthy
Party	Candidate	Votes	%	±%
Labour	J. Hill	899	55.3	+10.2
Conservative	F. Brooks*	726	44.7	−10.2
Majority		173	10.6	
Turnout		1,625		
Labour gain from Conservative		Swing		

=== Mandley Park ===
Mandley Park
Party	Candidate	Votes	%	±%
Conservative	V. E. Smith*	1,545	50.8	−5.0
Labour	L. Cooks	1,497	49.2	+5.0
Majority		48	1.6	−10.0
Turnout		3,042		
Conservative hold		Swing		

=== Ordsall Park ===
Ordsall Park
Party	Candidate	Votes	%	±%
Labour	W. Jackson*	877	59.3	'+9.2
Conservative	F. F. Dyson	469	31.7	−18.2
Liberal	E. Moores	134	9.0	N/A
Majority		408	27.6	+27.4
Turnout		1,480		
Labour hold		Swing		

=== Regent ===
Regent
Party	Candidate	Votes	%	±%
Labour	S. Turner	970	50.7	+15.4
Liberal	R. C. Allison	506	26.5	−5.4
Conservative	A. Bracken	436	22.8	−10.0
Majority		464	24.2	+21.7
Turnout		1,912		
Labour hold		Swing		

=== St. Matthias' ===
St. Matthias'
Party	Candidate	Votes	%	±%
Labour	J. W. Hincks	769	53.7	+10.1
Conservative	D. Peers	662	46.3	−10.1
Majority		107	7.4	
Turnout		1,431		
Labour hold		Swing		

=== St. Paul's ===
St. Paul's
Party	Candidate	Votes	%	±%
Labour	H. Williams	852	61.6	+15.2
Conservative	I. M. Wells	531	38.4	−15.2
Majority		321	23.2	
Turnout		1,383		
Labour gain from Conservative		Swing		

=== St. Thomas' ===
St. Thomas'
Party	Candidate	Votes	%	±%
Labour	J. Holt	661	59.7	+15.8
Conservative	E. Richmond*	446	40.3	−15.8
Majority		215	19.4	
Turnout		1,107		
Labour gain from Conservative		Swing		

=== Seedley ===
Seedley
Party	Candidate	Votes	%	±%
Conservative	D. Stafford*	1,231	57.5	−8.7
Labour	K. Murray	910	42.5	+8.7
Majority		321	15.0	−17.4
Turnout		2,141		
Conservative hold		Swing		

=== Trinity ===
Trinity
Party	Candidate	Votes	%	±%
Labour	M. Williams	445	53.8	+8.3
Conservative	J. Windsor*	382	46.2	−8.3
Majority		63	7.6	
Turnout		827		
Labour gain from Conservative		Swing		

=== Weaste ===
Weaste
Party	Candidate	Votes	%	±%
Conservative	A. Ashcroft*	1,460	53.7	−17.0
Labour	T. Hardman	1,260	46.3	+17.0
Majority		200	7.4	−34.0
Turnout		2,720		
Conservative hold		Swing		
