= 1947 Salford City Council election =

Local election in Salford

- 1 November 1947

16 of 64 seats on Salford City Council 33 seats needed for a majority
| | First party | Second party | Third party |
|---|---|---|---|
| Party | Labour | Conservative | Liberal |
| Last election | 10 seats, 49.9% | 6 seats, 43.7% | 0 seats, 6.0% |
| Seats before | 43 | 18 | 2 |
| Seats won | 8 | 8 | 0 |
| Seats after | 40 | 22 | 1 |
| Seat change | ▼3 | ▲4 | ▼1 |
| Popular vote | 35,905 | 36,380 | 3,531 |
| Percentage | 47.3% | 48.0% | 4.7% |
| Swing | ▼2.6% | ▲4.3% | ▼1.3% |
| | Fourth party |
| Party | Independent |
| Last election | 0 seats, 0.1% |
| Seats before | 1 |
| Seats won | 0 |
| Seats after | 1 |
| Seat change | Steady |
| Popular vote | 44 |
| Percentage | 0.1% |
| Swing | Steady |
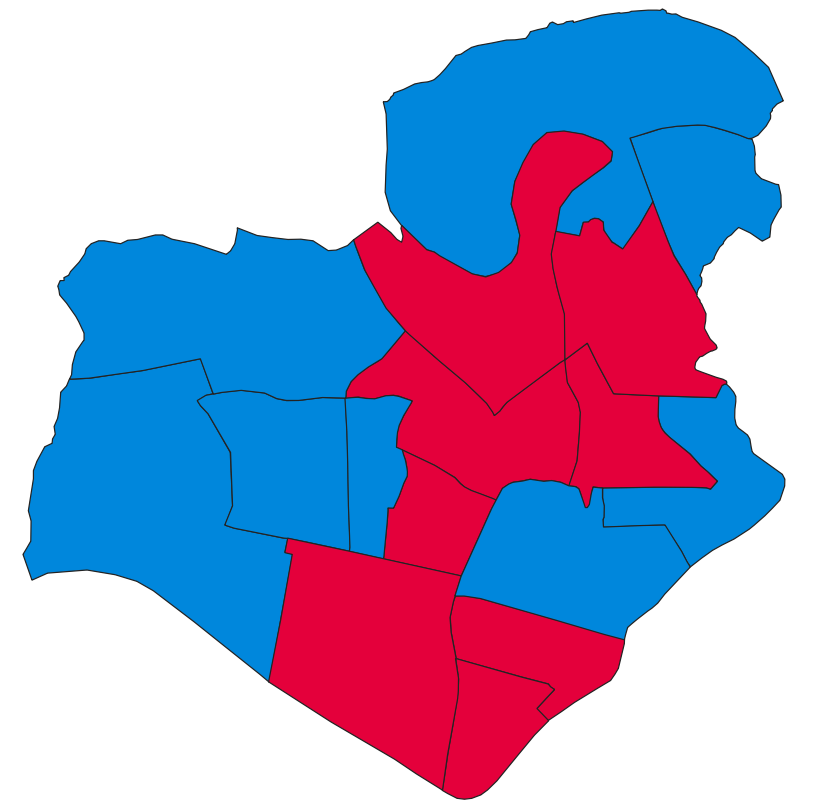
- Map of results of 1947 election
Leader of the Council before election
Labour
Leader of the Council after election
Labour

Elections to Salford City Council were held on Saturday, 1 November 1947. One-third of the councillors seats were up for election, with each successful candidate to serve a three-year term of office. The Labour Party retained overall control of the council.

== Election result ==
| Party | Votes | | Seats | | | Full Council | |
| Labour Party | 35,905 (47.3%) | ▼2.6 | 8 (50.0%) | 8 / 16 | ▼3 | 40 (62.5%) | 40 / 64 |
| Conservative Party | 36,380 (48.0%) | ▲4.3 | 8 (50.0%) | 8 / 16 | ▲4 | 22 (34.4%) | 22 / 64 |
| Liberal Party | 3,531 (4.7%) | ▼1.3 | 0 (0.0%) | 0 / 16 | ▼1 | 1 (1.6%) | 1 / 64 |
| Independent | 44 (0.1%) | Steady | 0 (0.0%) | 0 / 16 | Steady | 1 (1.6%) | 1 / 64 |

=== Full council ===
↓
| 40 | 1 | 1 | 22 |

=== Aldermen ===
↓
| 11 | 1 | 4 |

=== Councillors ===
↓
| 29 | 1 | 18 |

== Ward results ==
=== Albert Park ===
Albert Park
| Party | Candidate | Votes | % | ±% |
|---|---|---|---|---|
| Labour | G. D. Franks* | 2,693 | 45.0 | −2.2 |
| Conservative | F. Walton | 2,576 | 43.0 | −9.8 |
| Liberal | G. Fisher | 721 | 12.0 | N/A |
| Majority | | 117 | 2.0 | |
| Turnout | | 5,990 | | |
| Labour hold | | Swing | | |

=== Charlestown ===
Charlestown
| Party | Candidate | Votes | % | ±% |
|---|---|---|---|---|
| Labour | T. C. Loftus* | 2,734 | 55.9 | −4.5 |
| Conservative | M. V. Norbury | 2,161 | 44.1 | +9.4 |
| Majority | | 573 | 11.8 | −13.9 |
| Turnout | | 4,895 | | |
| Labour hold | | Swing | | |

=== Claremont ===
Claremont
| Party | Candidate | Votes | % | ±% |
|---|---|---|---|---|
| Conservative | E. A. Parker | 3,692 | 48.7 | +4.7 |
| Labour | S. W. Davis | 2,252 | 29.7 | −0.7 |
| Liberal | R. Pugh* | 1,632 | 21.6 | −4.0 |
| Majority | | 1,440 | 19.0 | +5.4 |
| Turnout | | 7,576 | | |
| Conservative gain from Liberal | | Swing | | |

=== Crescent ===
Crescent
| Party | Candidate | Votes | % | ±% |
|---|---|---|---|---|
| Conservative | J. W. Fieldsend | 1,666 | 50.1 | +2.0 |
| Labour | G. A. Marshall* | 1,659 | 49.9 | −2.0 |
| Majority | | 7 | 0.2 | |
| Turnout | | 3,325 | | |
| Conservative gain from Labour | | Swing | | |

=== Docks ===
Docks
| Party | Candidate | Votes | % | ±% |
|---|---|---|---|---|
| Labour | F. Dewhurst* | 2,687 | 57.5 | −1.2 |
| Conservative | D. Harrison | 1,983 | 42.5 | +1.2 |
| Majority | | 705 | 15.0 | −2.4 |
| Turnout | | 4,670 | | |
| Labour hold | | Swing | | |

=== Kersal ===
Kersal
| Party | Candidate | Votes | % | ±% |
|---|---|---|---|---|
| Conservative | T. H. Mellor* | 3,183 | 61.4 | +3.1 |
| Labour | W. J. Emery | 2,004 | 38.6 | −3.1 |
| Majority | | 1,179 | 22.8 | +6.2 |
| Turnout | | 5,187 | | |
| Conservative hold | | Swing | | |

=== Langworthy ===
Langworthy
| Party | Candidate | Votes | % | ±% |
|---|---|---|---|---|
| Conservative | C. R. V. Haynes | 2,532 | 50.6 | +1.8 |
| Labour | M. Whitehead* | 2,473 | 49.4 | −1.8 |
| Majority | | 59 | 1.2 | |
| Turnout | | 5,005 | | |
| Conservative gain from Labour | | Swing | | |

=== Mandley Park ===
Mandley Park
| Party | Candidate | Votes | % | ±% |
|---|---|---|---|---|
| Conservative | J. Whiteley* | 2,640 | 50.6 | +6.0 |
| Labour | L. Banks | 2,580 | 49.4 | −6.0 |
| Majority | | 60 | 1.2 | |
| Turnout | | 5,220 | | |
| Conservative hold | | Swing | | |

=== Ordsall Park ===
Ordsall Park
| Party | Candidate | Votes | % | ±% |
|---|---|---|---|---|
| Labour | W. Petrie* | 2,912 | 61.7 | −2.4 |
| Conservative | W. Stapley | 1,808 | 38.3 | +2.4 |
| Majority | | 1,104 | 23.4 | −4.8 |
| Turnout | | 4,720 | | |
| Labour hold | | Swing | | |

=== Regent ===
Regent
| Party | Candidate | Votes | % | ±% |
|---|---|---|---|---|
| Labour | G. C. Goodill | 2,487 | 54.6 | −0.2 |
| Conservative | J. E. Geary* | 2,071 | 45.4 | +7.5 |
| Majority | | 416 | 9.2 | −7.7 |
| Turnout | | 4,558 | | |
| Labour gain from Conservative | | Swing | | |

=== St. Matthias' ===
St. Matthias'
| Party | Candidate | Votes | % | ±% |
|---|---|---|---|---|
| Labour | R. Headon* | 2,267 | 50.5 | +3.4 |
| Conservative | W. S. Lappin | 2,224 | 49.5 | +3.2 |
| Majority | | 43 | 1.0 | +0.2 |
| Turnout | | 4,491 | | |
| Labour hold | | Swing | | |

=== St. Paul's ===
St. Paul's
| Party | Candidate | Votes | % | ±% |
|---|---|---|---|---|
| Labour | B. H. Rainbird* | 2,002 | 50.1 | −18.2 |
| Conservative | A. E. Clark | 1,995 | 49.9 | N/A |
| Majority | | 7 | 0.2 | −36.4 |
| Turnout | | 3,997 | | |
| Labour hold | | Swing | | |

=== St. Thomas' ===
St. Thomas'
| Party | Candidate | Votes | % | ±% |
|---|---|---|---|---|
| Labour | B. Davis* | 1,703 | 51.2 | −1.9 |
| Conservative | A. W. Mason | 1,316 | 39.6 | +7.1 |
| Liberal | W. H. Shaw | 308 | 9.2 | −3.7 |
| Majority | | 387 | 11.6 | −9.0 |
| Turnout | | 3,327 | | |
| Labour hold | | Swing | | |

=== Seedley ===
Seedley
| Party | Candidate | Votes | % | ±% |
|---|---|---|---|---|
| Conservative | A. Pendlebury | 2,493 | 52.0 | +0.6 |
| Labour | E. Barton* | 2,008 | 41.9 | −6.7 |
| Liberal | H. M. Crook | 248 | 5.2 | N/A |
| Independent | J. A. Hibbert | 44 | 0.9 | N/A |
| Majority | | 485 | 10.1 | +7.3 |
| Turnout | | 4,793 | | |
| Conservative gain from Labour | | Swing | | |

=== Trinity ===
Trinity
| Party | Candidate | Votes | % | ±% |
|---|---|---|---|---|
| Conservative | C. Brookes | 1,633 | 54.0 | −1.6 |
| Labour | A. Jones | 1,391 | 46.0 | +1.6 |
| Majority | | 242 | 8.0 | −3.2 |
| Turnout | | 3,024 | | |
| Conservative hold | | Swing | | |

=== Weaste ===
Weaste
| Party | Candidate | Votes | % | ±% |
|---|---|---|---|---|
| Conservative | J. Binns | 2,407 | 47.4 | +1.0 |
| Labour | H. Glencross* | 2,053 | 40.4 | −2.8 |
| Liberal | J. M. Ford | 622 | 12.2 | +1.8 |
| Majority | | 354 | 7.0 | +3.8 |
| Turnout | | 5,082 | | |
| Conservative gain from Labour | | Swing | | |
