= 1963 Salford City Council election =

Local election in Salford

- 9 May 1963

16 of 64 seats on Salford City Council 33 seats needed for a majority
	First party	Second party	Third party
Party	Labour	Conservative	Liberal
Last election	14 seats, 49.9%	1 seat, 36.1%	1 seat, 13.2%
Seats before	51	10	3
Seats won	11	4	1
Seats after	51	10	3
Seat change	Steady	Steady	Steady
Popular vote	20,221	12,917	3,411
Percentage	54.4%	34.8%	9.2%
Swing	▲4.5%	▼1.3%	▼4.0%
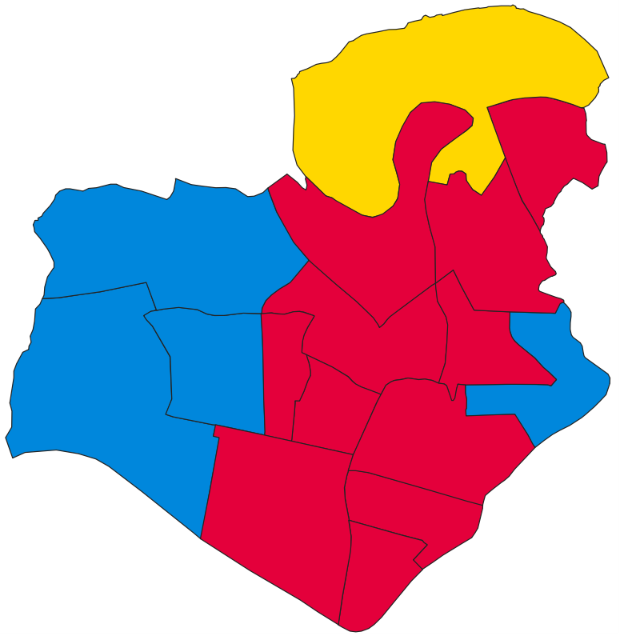
- Map of results of 1963 election
Leader of the Council before election
Labour
Leader of the Council after election
Labour

Elections to Salford City Council were held on Thursday, 9 May 1963. One-third of the councillors seats were up for election, with each successful candidate to serve a three-year term of office. The Labour Party retained overall control of the council.

== Election result ==
Party	Votes		Seats			Full Council	
Labour Party	20,221 (54.4%)	▲4.5	11 (68.8%)	11 / 16	Steady	51 (79.7%)	51 / 64
Conservative Party	12,917 (34.8%)	▼1.3	4 (25.0%)	4 / 16	Steady	10 (15.6%)	10 / 64
Liberal Party	3,411 (9.2%)	▼4.0	1 (6.3%)	1 / 16	Steady	3 (4.7%)	3 / 64
Communist	601 (1.6%)	▲0.8	0 (0.0%)	0 / 16	Steady	0 (0.0%)	0 / 64

=== Full council ===
↓
51	3	10

=== Aldermen ===
↓
16

=== Councillors ===
↓
35	3	10

== Ward results ==
=== Albert Park ===
Albert Park
Party	Candidate	Votes	%	±%
Labour	H. McFarlane*	1,821	56.5	+6.0
Liberal	J. J. Messenger	759	23.5	−6.5
Conservative	E. Graham	643	20.0	+0.5
Majority		1,062	33.0	+12.5
Turnout		3,223		
Labour hold		Swing		

=== Charlestown ===
Charlestown
Party	Candidate	Votes	%	±%
Labour	P. R. Duffy*	1,669	71.7	+19.3
Conservative	G. J. Hacking	587	25.2	−18.4
Communist	J. Billington	73	3.1	−0.9
Majority		1,082	46.5	+37.7
Turnout		2,329		
Labour hold		Swing		

=== Claremont ===
Claremont
Party	Candidate	Votes	%	±%
Conservative	G. M. Joplin*	2,584	62.2	+12.8
Labour	A. Adams	1,574	37.8	+11.9
Majority		1,010	24.4	+0.9
Turnout		4,158		
Conservative hold		Swing		

=== Crescent ===
Crescent
Party	Candidate	Votes	%	±%
Labour	A. Jones*	719	73.7	+6.6
Conservative	B. Baxter	257	26.3	−6.6
Majority		462	47.4	+13.2
Turnout		976		
Labour hold		Swing		

=== Docks ===
Docks
Party	Candidate	Votes	%	±%
Labour	E. Warburton*	1,214	72.3	−1.1
Conservative	A. E. Watkins	382	22.7	−3.9
Communist	T. A. Bentley	84	5.0	N/A
Majority		832	49.6	+2.8
Turnout		1,680		
Labour hold		Swing		

=== Kersal ===
Kersal
Party	Candidate	Votes	%	±%
Liberal	M. R. Marks*	1,953	47.6	+2.9
Labour	L. Hough	1,342	32.7	+5.3
Conservative	R. Goodman	809	19.7	−8.2
Majority		611	14.9	+2.3
Turnout		4,104		
Liberal hold		Swing		

=== Langworthy ===
Langworthy
Party	Candidate	Votes	%	±%
Labour	J. Hill*	1,059	88.3	+21.6
Communist	J. J. Farr	140	11.7	N/A
Majority		919	76.6	+43.2
Turnout		1,199		
Labour hold		Swing		

=== Mandley Park ===
Mandley Park
Party	Candidate	Votes	%	±%
Labour	S. Davies*	1,862	48.3	+4.9
Conservative	G. Franks	1,536	39.8	+4.4
Liberal	D. Green	458	11.9	−9.3
Majority		326	8.5	+0.5
Turnout		3,856		
Labour hold		Swing		

=== Ordsall Park ===
Ordsall Park
Party	Candidate	Votes	%	±%
Labour	I. Zott*	1,507	71.8	+12.8
Conservative	C. Brookes	489	23.3	−13.6
Communist	J. Cohen	104	4.9	+0.8
Majority		1,018	48.5	+26.4
Turnout		2,100		
Labour hold		Swing		

=== Regent ===
Regent
Party	Candidate	Votes	%	±%
Labour	L. F. Mossom*	1,161	71.0	+4.8
Conservative	J. Bradbury	372	22.8	−6.2
Communist	K. Harvey	102	6.2	+0.4
Majority		789	48.2	+12.0
Turnout		1,635		
Labour hold		Swing		

=== St. Matthias' ===
St. Matthias'
Party	Candidate	Votes	%	±%
Labour	W. Fletcher*	988	58.3	+2.2
Conservative	J. H. Winder	467	27.5	+1.3
Liberal	D. Hammond	241	14.2	−3.5
Majority		521	30.8	+0.9
Turnout		1,696		
Labour hold		Swing		

=== St. Paul's ===
St. Paul's
Party	Candidate	Votes	%	±%
Labour	H. Williams*	1,068	70.9	+2.7
Conservative	R. Whitworth	438	29.1	−2.7
Majority		630	41.8	+5.4
Turnout		1,506		
Labour hold		Swing		

=== St. Thomas' ===
St. Thomas'
Party	Candidate	Votes	%	±%
Labour	T. Cunningham*	636	68.8	−0.6
Conservative	R. Stones	288	31.2	+0.6
Majority		348	37.6	−1.2
Turnout		924		
Labour hold		Swing		

=== Seedley ===
Seedley
Party	Candidate	Votes	%	±%
Conservative	R. Evans*	1,577	53.9	+7.8
Labour	S. Bibby	1,351	46.1	−7.8
Majority		226	7.8	
Turnout		2,928		
Conservative hold		Swing		

=== Trinity ===
Trinity
Party	Candidate	Votes	%	±%
Conservative	F. L. Fenton*	640	50.2	+3.2
Labour	H. Ferguson	635	49.8	−3.2
Majority		5	0.4	
Turnout		1,275		
Conservative hold		Swing		

=== Weaste ===
Weaste
Party	Candidate	Votes	%	±%
Conservative	J. M. Ford	1,848	51.9	+5.4
Labour	R. Dodd	1,615	45.4	−8.1
Communist	C. N. Peach	98	2.7	N/A
Majority		233	6.5	
Turnout		3,561		
Conservative hold		Swing		
