= 1969 Salford City Council election =

Local election in Salford

- 8 May 1969

16 of 64 seats on Salford City Council 33 seats needed for a majority
| | First party | Second party | Third party |
|---|---|---|---|
| Party | Conservative | Labour | Liberal |
| Last election | 15 seats, 57.2% | 0 seats, 33.5% | 1 seat, 9.2% |
| Seats before | 40 | 20 | 4 |
| Seats won | 12 | 2 | 2 |
| Seats after | 46 | 13 | 5 |
| Seat change | ▲6 | ▼7 | ▲1 |
| Popular vote | 16,688 | 10,802 | 3,007 |
| Percentage | 54.7% | 35.4% | 9.9% |
| Swing | ▼2.5% | ▲1.9% | ▲0.7% |
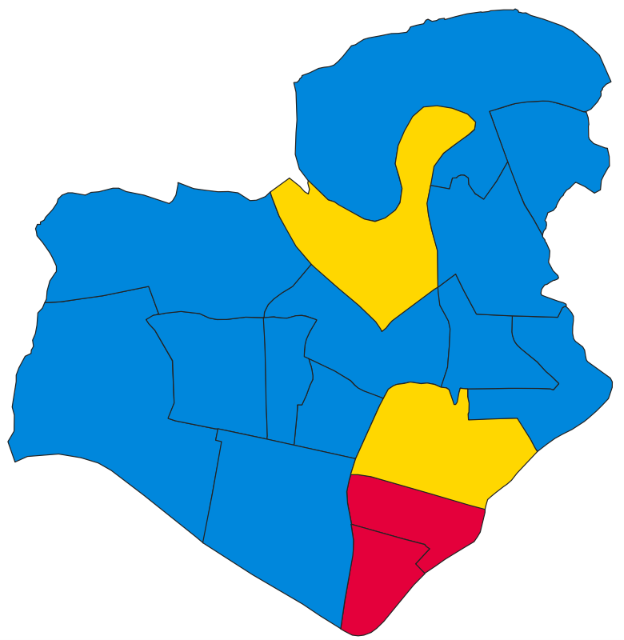
- Map of results of 1969 election
Leader of the Council before election
Conservative
Leader of the Council after election
Conservative

Elections to Salford City Council were held on Thursday, 8 May 1969. One-third of the councillors seats were up for election, with each successful candidate to serve a three-year term of office. The Conservative Party retained overall control of the council.

== Election result ==
| Party | Votes | | Seats | | | Full Council | |
| Conservative Party | 16,688 (54.7%) | ▼2.5 | 12 (75.0%) | 12 / 16 | ▲6 | 46 (71.9%) | 46 / 64 |
| Labour Party | 10,802 (35.4%) | ▲1.9 | 2 (12.5%) | 2 / 16 | ▼7 | 13 (20.3%) | 13 / 64 |
| Liberal Party | 3,007 (9.9%) | ▲0.7 | 2 (12.5%) | 2 / 16 | ▲1 | 5 (7.8%) | 5 / 64 |

=== Full council ===
↓
| 13 | 5 | 46 |

=== Aldermen ===
↓
| 8 | 1 | 7 |

=== Councillors ===
↓
| 5 | 4 | 39 |

== Ward results ==
=== Albert Park ===
Albert Park
| Party | Candidate | Votes | % | ±% |
|---|---|---|---|---|
| Conservative | E. Marland | 1,426 | 53.0 | −3.5 |
| Labour | H. McFarlane* | 1,265 | 47.0 | +3.5 |
| Majority | | 161 | 6.0 | −7.0 |
| Turnout | | 2,691 | | |
| Conservative gain from Labour | | Swing | | |

=== Charlestown ===
Charlestown
| Party | Candidate | Votes | % | ±% |
|---|---|---|---|---|
| Liberal | P. Smith | 678 | 35.9 | N/A |
| Labour | P. R. Duffy* | 606 | 32.1 | −8.9 |
| Conservative | B. I. Hopkins | 604 | 32.0 | −27.0 |
| Majority | | 72 | 3.8 | |
| Turnout | | 1,888 | | |
| Liberal gain from Labour | | Swing | | |

=== Claremont ===
Claremont
| Party | Candidate | Votes | % | ±% |
|---|---|---|---|---|
| Conservative | M. Cooper* | 2,449 | 78.4 | +5.1 |
| Labour | M. Williams | 674 | 21.6 | +5.0 |
| Majority | | 1,775 | 56.8 | +0.1 |
| Turnout | | 3,123 | | |
| Conservative hold | | Swing | | |

=== Crescent ===
Crescent
| Party | Candidate | Votes | % | ±% |
|---|---|---|---|---|
| Liberal | M. Corwin | 419 | 49.1 | +9.6 |
| Conservative | E. Duffy | 234 | 27.4 | −5.8 |
| Labour | R. Dodd* | 201 | 23.5 | −3.9 |
| Majority | | 185 | 21.7 | +15.4 |
| Turnout | | 854 | | |
| Liberal gain from Labour | | Swing | | |

=== Docks ===
Docks
| Party | Candidate | Votes | % | ±% |
|---|---|---|---|---|
| Conservative | T. Flynn | 981 | 59.6 | −4.4 |
| Labour | E. Warburton* | 665 | 40.4 | +4.4 |
| Majority | | 316 | 19.2 | −8.8 |
| Turnout | | 1,646 | | |
| Conservative gain from Labour | | Swing | | |

=== Kersal ===
Kersal
| Party | Candidate | Votes | % | ±% |
|---|---|---|---|---|
| Conservative | R. Heron | 1,589 | 45.2 | +3.3 |
| Liberal | S. Harris* | 1,351 | 38.5 | −0.7 |
| Labour | W. Jackson | 573 | 16.3 | −2.6 |
| Majority | | 238 | 6.7 | +4.0 |
| Turnout | | 3,513 | | |
| Conservative gain from Liberal | | Swing | | |

=== Langworthy ===
Langworthy
| Party | Candidate | Votes | % | ±% |
|---|---|---|---|---|
| Conservative | S. Brierley | 825 | 54.9 | −8.3 |
| Labour | J. Hill* | 678 | 45.1 | +8.3 |
| Majority | | 147 | 9.8 | −16.6 |
| Turnout | | 1,503 | | |
| Conservative gain from Labour | | Swing | | |

=== Mandley Park ===
Mandley Park
| Party | Candidate | Votes | % | ±% |
|---|---|---|---|---|
| Conservative | G. F. Pollard* | 1,642 | 55.8 | +1.0 |
| Labour | T. J. A. Harding | 1,300 | 44.2 | −1.0 |
| Majority | | 342 | 11.6 | +2.0 |
| Turnout | | 2,942 | | |
| Conservative hold | | Swing | | |

=== Ordsall Park ===
Ordsall Park
| Party | Candidate | Votes | % | ±% |
|---|---|---|---|---|
| Labour | I. Zott* | 743 | 50.1 | +7.8 |
| Conservative | F. F. Dyson | 742 | 49.9 | +7.5 |
| Majority | | 1 | 0.2 | |
| Turnout | | 1,485 | | |
| Labour hold | | Swing | | |

=== Regent ===
Regent
| Party | Candidate | Votes | % | ±% |
|---|---|---|---|---|
| Labour | P. Grimshaw | 617 | 35.3 | −7.6 |
| Conservative | A. Bracken | 574 | 32.8 | −13.3 |
| Liberal | R. C. Allison | 559 | 31.9 | +20.9 |
| Majority | | 43 | 2.5 | |
| Turnout | | 1,750 | | |
| Labour hold | | Swing | | |

=== St. Matthias' ===
St. Matthias'
| Party | Candidate | Votes | % | ±% |
|---|---|---|---|---|
| Conservative | J. Bradbury | 819 | 56.4 | +2.1 |
| Labour | J. W. Hincks* | 634 | 43.6 | −2.1 |
| Majority | | 185 | 12.8 | +4.2 |
| Turnout | | 1,453 | | |
| Conservative gain from Labour | | Swing | | |

=== St. Paul's ===
St. Paul's
| Party | Candidate | Votes | % | ±% |
|---|---|---|---|---|
| Conservative | R. Connor | 695 | 53.6 | +7.9 |
| Labour | H. Williams* | 602 | 46.4 | +7.8 |
| Majority | | 93 | 7.2 | +0.1 |
| Turnout | | 1,297 | | |
| Conservative gain from Labour | | Swing | | |

=== St. Thomas' ===
St. Thomas'
| Party | Candidate | Votes | % | ±% |
|---|---|---|---|---|
| Conservative | J. A. Broster* | 475 | 56.1 | −10.3 |
| Labour | J. Holt | 372 | 43.9 | +12.6 |
| Majority | | 103 | 12.9 | −22.9 |
| Turnout | | 847 | | |
| Conservative hold | | Swing | | |

=== Seedley ===
Seedley
| Party | Candidate | Votes | % | ±% |
|---|---|---|---|---|
| Conservative | A. W. Evans* | 1,624 | 66.2 | −3.2 |
| Labour | J. Statham | 829 | 33.8 | +3.2 |
| Majority | | 795 | 32.4 | −6.4 |
| Turnout | | 2,453 | | |
| Conservative hold | | Swing | | |

=== Trinity ===
Trinity
| Party | Candidate | Votes | % | ±% |
|---|---|---|---|---|
| Conservative | R. Jennings* | 502 | 54.5 | +6.8 |
| Labour | A. Adams | 419 | 45.5 | +3.7 |
| Majority | | 83 | 9.0 | +3.1 |
| Turnout | | 921 | | |
| Conservative hold | | Swing | | |

=== Weaste ===
Weaste
| Party | Candidate | Votes | % | ±% |
|---|---|---|---|---|
| Conservative | W. T. Tyrer* | 1,507 | 70.7 | −3.9 |
| Labour | A. Richardson | 624 | 29.3 | +3.9 |
| Majority | | 883 | 41.4 | −7.8 |
| Turnout | | 2,131 | | |
| Conservative hold | | Swing | | |
