= 1954 Salford City Council election =

Local election in Salford

- 13 May 1954

16 of 64 seats on Salford City Council 33 seats needed for a majority
	First party	Second party
Party	Labour	Conservative
Last election	13 seats, 54.3%	3 seats, 43.1%
Seats before	52	12
Seats won	12	4
Seats after	56	8
Seat change	▲4	▼4
Popular vote	26,962	20,894
Percentage	55.7%	43.2%
Swing	▲1.4%	▲0.1%
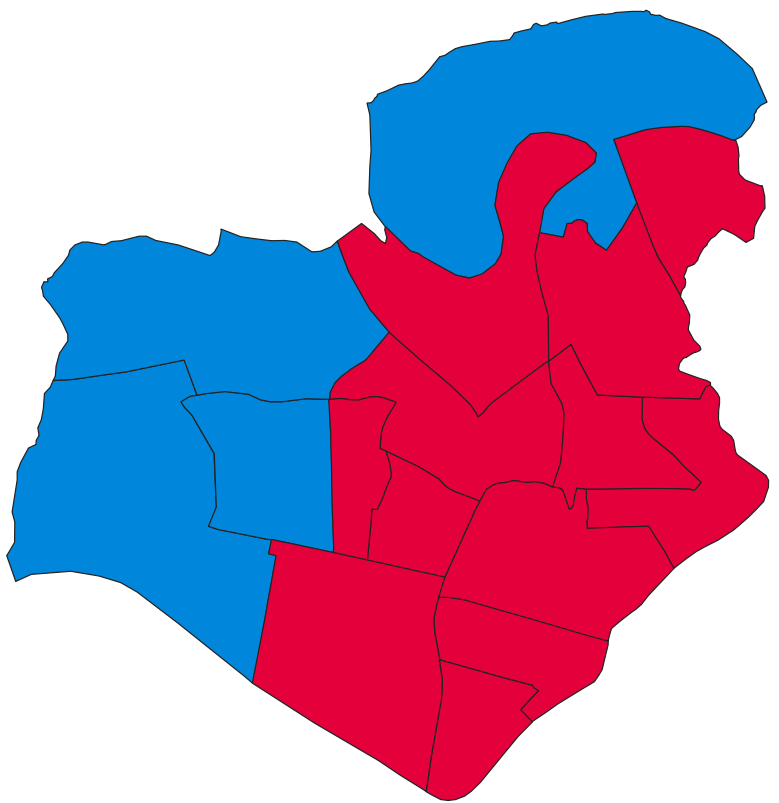
- Map of results of 1954 election
Leader of the Council before election
Labour
Leader of the Council after election
Labour

Elections to Salford City Council were held on Thursday, 13 May 1954. One-third of the councillors seats were up for election, with each successful candidate to serve a three-year term of office. The Labour Party retained overall control of the council.

== Election result ==
Party	Votes		Seats			Full Council	
Labour Party	26,962 (55.7%)	▲1.4	12 (75.0%)	12 / 16	▲4	56 (87.5%)	56 / 64
Conservative Party	20,894 (43.2%)	▲0.1	4 (25.0%)	4 / 16	▼4	8 (12.5%)	8 / 64
Liberal Party	322 (0.7%)	▼1.7	0 (0.0%)	0 / 16	Steady	0 (0.0%)	0 / 64
Communist	210 (0.4%)	▲0.2	0 (0.0%)	0 / 16	Steady	0 (0.0%)	0 / 64

=== Full council ===
↓
56	8

=== Aldermen ===
↓
16

=== Councillors ===
↓
40	8

== Ward results ==
=== Albert Park ===
Albert Park
Party	Candidate	Votes	%	±%
Labour	H. McFarlane	2,551	55.4	+2.9
Conservative	J. S. Stewart*	2,051	44.6	−2.9
Majority		500	10.8	+5.8
Turnout		4,602		
Labour gain from Conservative		Swing		

=== Charlestown ===
Charlestown
Party	Candidate	Votes	%	±%
Labour	W. White*	1,914	60.3	+2.5
Conservative	R. Ranicar	1,167	36.8	−2.5
Communist	E. Grundy	93	2.9	0
Majority		747	23.5	+5.0
Turnout		3,174		
Labour hold		Swing		

=== Claremont ===
Claremont
Party	Candidate	Votes	%	±%
Conservative	E. A. Parker*	3,011	64.0	+1.9
Labour	W. Neafsey	1,696	36.0	−1.9
Majority		1,315	28.0	+3.8
Turnout		4,707		
Conservative hold		Swing		

=== Crescent ===
Crescent
Party	Candidate	Votes	%	±%
Labour	A. Jones*	1,173	65.5	+7.3
Conservative	S. Hobson	619	34.5	−7.3
Majority		554	31.0	+14.6
Turnout		1,792		
Labour hold		Swing		

=== Docks ===
Docks
Party	Candidate	Votes	%	±%
Labour	F. Dewhurst*	1,842	66.8	+4.8
Conservative	R. Vesty	916	33.2	−4.8
Majority		926	33.6	+9.6
Turnout		2,758		
Labour hold		Swing		

=== Kersal ===
Kersal
Party	Candidate	Votes	%	±%
Conservative	T. H. Mellor*	2,319	60.9	+14.5
Labour	H. Ratner	1,486	39.1	−14.5
Majority		833	21.8	
Turnout		3,805		
Conservative hold		Swing		

=== Langworthy ===
Langworthy
Party	Candidate	Votes	%	±%
Labour	J. Hill	1,489	56.9	+4.4
Conservative	E. Phillips	806	30.8	+1.0
Liberal	G. C. Chappell	322	12.3	−5.4
Majority		683	26.1	+3.4
Turnout		2,617		
Labour gain from Conservative		Swing		

=== Mandley Park ===
Mandley Park
Party	Candidate	Votes	%	±%
Labour	S. Davies	2,578	53.1	−6.9
Conservative	J. H. Franks	2,277	46.9	+6.9
Majority		301	6.2	−13.8
Turnout		4,855		
Labour gain from Conservative		Swing		

=== Ordsall Park ===
Ordsall Park
Party	Candidate	Votes	%	±%
Labour	W. Petrie*	2,049	94.6	+27.1
Communist	J. Cohen	117	5.4	N/A
Majority		1,932	89.2	+54.2
Turnout		2,166		
Labour hold		Swing		

=== Regent ===
Regent
Party	Candidate	Votes	%	±%
Labour	L. F. Mossom*	1,725	64.1	−1.4
Conservative	T. Fenner	968	35.9	+1.4
Majority		757	28.2	−2.8
Turnout		2,693		
Labour hold		Swing		

=== St. Matthias' ===
St. Matthias'
Party	Candidate	Votes	%	±%
Labour	W. Fletcher*	1,216	62.2	+2.3
Conservative	W. H. Povah	738	37.8	−2.3
Majority		478	24.4	+4.6
Turnout		1,954		
Labour hold		Swing		

=== St. Paul's ===
St. Paul's
Party	Candidate	Votes	%	±%
Labour	H. Williams*	1,548	66.6	+9.4
Conservative	D. M. Angel	778	33.4	−0.4
Majority		770	33.2	+9.8
Turnout		2,326		
Labour hold		Swing		

=== St. Thomas' ===
St. Thomas'
Party	Candidate	Votes	%	±%
Labour	B. Davis*	1,363	66.6	+2.1
Conservative	W. Parkin	684	33.4	−2.1
Majority		679	33.2	+4.2
Turnout		2,047		
Labour hold		Swing		

=== Seedley ===
Seedley
Party	Candidate	Votes	%	±%
Conservative	A. Pendlebury*	1,808	55.5	+9.1
Labour	A. Karpin	1,448	44.5	+4.6
Majority		360	11.0	+4.5
Turnout		3,256		
Conservative hold		Swing		

=== Trinity ===
Trinity
Party	Candidate	Votes	%	±%
Labour	M. Flanagan	1,031	59.5	+6.2
Conservative	A. Sacks	702	40.5	−6.2
Majority		329	19.0	+12.4
Turnout		1,733		
Labour gain from Conservative		Swing		

=== Weaste ===
Weaste
Party	Candidate	Votes	%	±%
Conservative	W. Jones	2,050	52.5	+0.8
Labour	E. L. Hardcastle	1,853	47.5	−0.8
Majority		197	5.0	+1.6
Turnout		3,903		
Conservative hold		Swing		
