= 1960 Salford City Council election =

Local election in Salford

- 12 May 1960

17 of 64 seats on Salford City Council 33 seats needed for a majority
	First party	Second party	Third party
Party	Labour	Conservative	Liberal
Last election	13 seats, 54.3%	3 seats, 41.2%	0 seats, 3.8%
Seats before	55	9	0
Seats won	11	5	1
Seats after	52	11	1
Seat change	▼3	▲2	▲1
Popular vote	18,080	18,773	2,525
Percentage	45.7%	47.4%	6.4%
Swing	▼8.6%	▲6.2%	▲2.6%
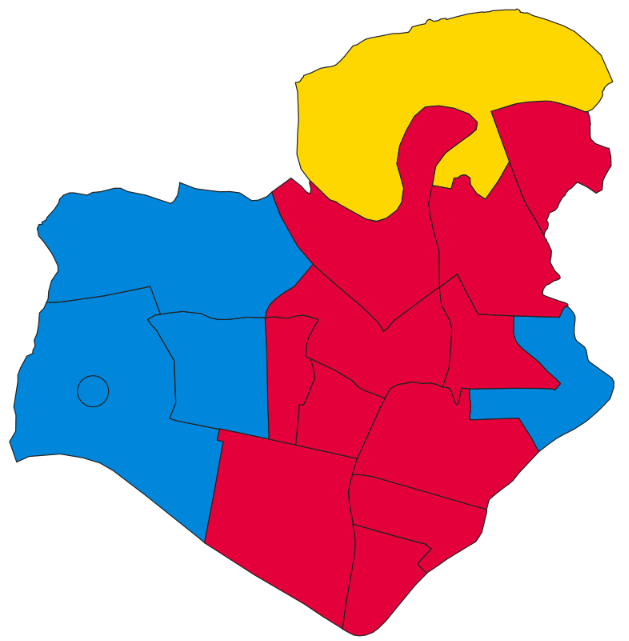
- Map of results of 1960 election
Leader of the Council before election
Labour
Leader of the Council after election
Labour

Elections to Salford City Council were held on Thursday, 12 May 1960. One-third of the councillors seats were up for election, with each successful candidate to serve a three-year term of office. The Labour Party retained overall control of the council.

== Election result ==
Party	Votes		Seats			Full Council	
Labour Party	18,080 (45.7%)	▼8.6	11 (64.7%)	11 / 17	▼3	52 (81.3%)	52 / 64
Conservative Party	18,773 (47.4%)	▲6.2	5 (29.4%)	5 / 17	▲2	11 (17.2%)	11 / 64
Liberal Party	2,525 (6.4%)	▲2.6	1 (5.9%)	1 / 17	▲1	1 (1.6%)	1 / 64
Communist	218 (0.6%)	▲0.1	0 (0.0%)	0 / 17	Steady	0 (0.0%)	0 / 64

=== Full council ===
↓
52	1	11

=== Aldermen ===
↓
16

=== Councillors ===
↓
36	1	11

== Ward results ==
=== Albert Park ===
Albert Park
Party	Candidate	Votes	%	±%
Labour	H. McFarlane*	1,387	45.5	−14.6
Conservative	R. Dixon	889	29.2	−10.7
Liberal	M. Corwin	772	25.3	N/A
Majority		498	16.3	−3.9
Turnout		3,048		
Labour hold		Swing		

=== Charlestown ===
Charlestown
Party	Candidate	Votes	%	±%
Labour	P. R. Duffy	1,008	53.2	−3.3
Conservative	E. Jones	781	41.3	+2.8
Communist	J. Billington	104	5.5	+5.0
Majority		227	11.9	−6.1
Turnout		1,893		
Labour hold		Swing		

=== Claremont ===
Claremont
Party	Candidate	Votes	%	±%
Conservative	G. M. Joplin*	2,839	72.2	+2.0
Labour	F. Cowin	1,094	27.8	−2.0
Majority		1,745	43.4	+4.0
Turnout		3,933		
Conservative hold		Swing		

=== Crescent ===
Crescent
Party	Candidate	Votes	%	±%
Labour	A. Jones*	787	58.3	−9.2
Conservative	W. Scott	564	41.7	+9.2
Majority		223	16.6	−18.4
Turnout		1,351		
Labour hold		Swing		

=== Docks ===
Docks
Party	Candidate	Votes	%	±%
Labour	S. Blake	986	61.5	−9.8
Conservative	P. Bradley	618	38.5	+9.8
Majority		368	23.0	−19.6
Turnout		1,604		
Labour hold		Swing		

=== Kersal ===
Kersal
Party	Candidate	Votes	%	±%
Liberal	M. R. Marks	1,753	43.7	+10.5
Labour	G. D. Franks*	1,184	29.5	−10.2
Conservative	G. F. Pollard	1,078	26.8	+0.5
Majority		569	14.2	+7.7
Turnout		4,015		
Liberal gain from Labour		Swing		

=== Langworthy ===
Langworthy
Party	Candidate	Votes	%	±%
Labour	J. Hill*	941	52.2	−16.2
Conservative	H. Mellor	862	47.8	+16.2
Majority		79	4.4	−32.4
Turnout		1,803		
Labour hold		Swing		

=== Mandley Park ===
Mandley Park
Party	Candidate	Votes	%	±%
Labour	S. Davies*	1,826	51.4	−1.3
Conservative	J. E. Bedell	1,727	48.6	+1.3
Majority		99	2.8	−2.6
Turnout		3,553		
Labour hold		Swing		

=== Ordsall Park ===
Ordsall Park
Party	Candidate	Votes	%	±%
Labour	I. Zott*	1,102	68.8	−7.4
Conservative	W. H. Burke	386	24.1	+5.0
Communist	J. Cohen	114	7.1	+2.4
Majority		716	44.7	−12.4
Turnout		1,602		
Labour hold		Swing		

=== Regent ===
Regent
Party	Candidate	Votes	%	±%
Labour	L. F. Mossom*	1,003	65.0	−4.1
Conservative	A. Fielding	541	35.0	+4.1
Majority		462	30.0	−8.2
Turnout		1,544		
Labour hold		Swing		

=== St. Matthias' ===
St. Matthias'
Party	Candidate	Votes	%	±%
Labour	W. Fletcher*	702	51.1	−4.0
Conservative	J. H. Winder	672	48.9	+4.0
Majority		30	2.2	−8.0
Turnout		1,374		
Labour hold		Swing		

=== St. Paul's ===
St. Paul's
Party	Candidate	Votes	%	±%
Labour	H. Williams*	975	59.1	−10.1
Conservative	A. Boardman	674	40.9	+10.1
Majority		301	18.2	−20.2
Turnout		1,649		
Labour hold		Swing		

=== St. Thomas' ===
St. Thomas'
Party	Candidate	Votes	%	±%
Labour	T. Cunningham*	644	54.9	−13.5
Conservative	J. Tilby	529	45.1	+13.6
Majority		115	9.8	−27.2
Turnout		1,173		
Labour hold		Swing		

=== Seedley ===
Seedley
Party	Candidate	Votes	%	±%
Conservative	R. Evans	1,825	61.9	+10.8
Labour	J. Woolley	1,123	38.1	−10.8
Majority		702	23.8	+21.6
Turnout		2,948		
Conservative hold		Swing		

=== Trinity ===
Trinity
Party	Candidate	Votes	%	±%
Conservative	F. L. Fenton	716	55.2	+9.0
Labour	M. Flanagan*	580	44.8	−9.0
Majority		136	10.4	
Turnout		1,296		
Conservative gain from Labour		Swing		

=== Weaste ===
Weaste (2 vacancies)
Party	Candidate	Votes	%	±%
Conservative	J. Whiteley	2,049	60.2	+3.8
Conservative	J. Hacking	2,023	59.4	+3.0
Labour	B. Wallsworth*	1,410	41.4	−2.2
Labour	H. Shulkind	1,328	39.0	−4.6
Majority		613	18.0	+5.2
Turnout		3,406		
Conservative gain from Labour		Swing		
Conservative hold		Swing		
