= 1929 Salford City Council election =

Local election in Salford

- 1 November 1929

16 of 64 seats on Salford City Council 33 seats needed for a majority
	First party	Second party	Third party
Party	Labour	Conservative	Liberal
Last election	9 seats, 48.2%	6 seats, 44.0%	0 seats, 0.0%
Seats before	23	23	10
Seats won	10	2	2
Seats after	26	22	10
Seat change	▲3	▼1	Steady
Popular vote	24,398	11,819	5,080
Percentage	49.7%	24.1%	10.4%
Swing	▲1.5%	▼19.9%	▲10.4%
	Fourth party
Party	Independent
Last election	1 seats, 7.7%
Seats before	8
Seats won	2
Seats after	6
Seat change	▼2
Popular vote	7,752
Percentage	15.8%
Swing	▲8.1%
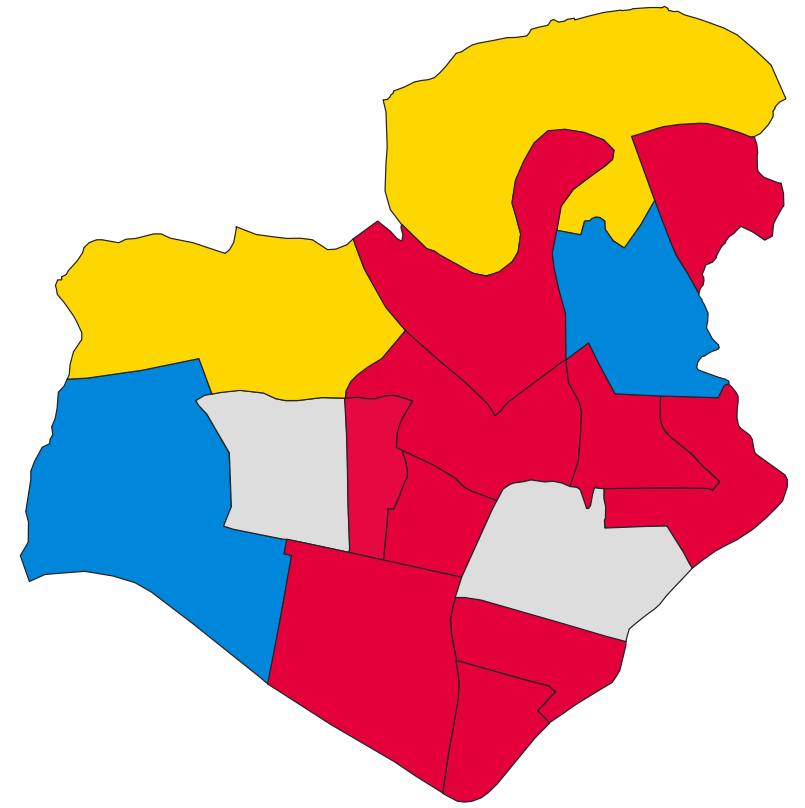
- Map of results of 1929 election
Leader of the Council before election
No overall control
Leader of the Council after election
No overall control

Elections to Salford City Council were held on Friday, 1 November 1929. One third of the councillors seats were up for election, with each successful candidate to serve a three-year term of office. The council remained under no overall control.

== Election result ==
Party	Votes		Seats			Full Council	
Labour Party	24,398 (49.7%)	▲1.5	10 (62.5%)	10 / 16	▲3	26 (40.6%)	26 / 64
Conservative Party	11,819 (24.1%)	▼19.9	2 (12.5%)	2 / 16	▼1	22 (34.4%)	22 / 64
Liberal Party	5,080 (10.4%)	▲10.4	2 (12.5%)	2 / 16	Steady	10 (15.6%)	10 / 64
Independent	7,752 (15.8%)	▲8.1	1 (12.5%)	2 / 16	▼2	6 (9.4%)	6 / 64

=== Full council ===
↓
26	10	6	22

=== Aldermen ===
↓
1	6	9

=== Councillors ===
↓
25	4	6	13

== Ward results ==
=== Albert Park ===
Albert Park
Party	Candidate	Votes	%	±%
Conservative	T. Clarke	1,705	51.0	−5.6
Labour	J. A. Webb	1,640	49.0	+5.6
Majority		65	2.0	−11.2
Turnout		3,345	44.2	−22.9
Conservative hold		Swing		

=== Charlestown ===
Charlestown
Party	Candidate	Votes	%	±%
Labour	G. Howard*	2,279	55.2	+2.8
Liberal	T. H. Nightingale	1,850	44.8	N/A
Majority		429	10.4	+4.4
Turnout		4,129	55.3	−14.5
Labour hold		Swing		

=== Claremont ===
Claremont
Party	Candidate	Votes	%	±%
Liberal	A. H. Collins*	1,709	78.4	N/A
Labour	M. Payne	470	21.6	+4.0
Majority		1,239	56.8	
Turnout		2,179	45.2	−24.7
Liberal hold		Swing		

=== Crescent ===
Crescent
Party	Candidate	Votes	%	±%
Independent	J. Higginbottom*	2,135	56.1	N/A
Labour	J. A. Brewin	1,673	43.9	−10.1
Majority		462	12.2	
Turnout		3,808	51.2	−2.7
Independent hold		Swing		

=== Docks ===
Docks
Party	Candidate	Votes	%	±%
Labour	G. H. Pearson	1,337	53.5	+8.2
Conservative	R. Whitfield*	1,163	46.5	−8.2
Majority		174	7.0	
Turnout		2,500	43.3	−17.3
Labour gain from Conservative		Swing		

=== Kersal ===
Kersal
Party	Candidate	Votes	%	±%
Liberal	J. Jackson*	1,521	70.4	N/A
Labour	G. Watson	641	29.6	+1.1
Majority		880	40.8	
Turnout		2,162	38.3	−9.2
Liberal hold		Swing		

=== Langworthy ===
Langworthy
Party	Candidate	Votes	%	±%
Labour	E. E. Dale*	1,720	59.5	+10.8
Conservative	J. Southworth	1,173	40.5	−10.8
Majority		547	19.0	
Turnout		2,893	48.9	−22.9
Labour hold		Swing		

=== Mandley Park ===
Mandley Park
Party	Candidate	Votes	%	±%
Labour	J. Park*	1,960	54.4	+2.3
Conservative	J. K. Mitchell	1,640	45.6	−2.3
Majority		320	8.8	+4.6
Turnout		3,600	51.9	−6.6
Labour hold		Swing		

=== Ordsall Park ===
Ordsall Park
Party	Candidate	Votes	%	±%
Labour	T. Walsh*	1,735	66.9	+7.8
Independent	E. J. Ellis	858	33.1	N/A
Majority		877	33.8	+15.6
Turnout		2,593	35.5	−23.2
Labour hold		Swing		

=== Regent ===
Regent
Party	Candidate	Votes	%	±%
Labour	A. Moss*	1,990	56.6	+1.1
Conservative	R. Heywood	1,529	43.4	−1.1
Majority		461	13.2	+2.2
Turnout		3,519	46.2	−18.6
Labour hold		Swing		

=== St. Matthias' ===
St. Matthias'
Party	Candidate	Votes	%	±%
Labour	J. A. Webb	2,151	55.6	+3.1
Independent	M. Moylan*	1,721	44.4	N/A
Majority		430	11.2	+6.2
Turnout		3,872	54.5	−6.5
Labour gain from Independent		Swing		

=== St. Paul's ===
St. Paul's
Party	Candidate	Votes	%	±%
Labour	L. Webb*	1,696	56.7	+2.3
Conservative	O. A. Buck	1,294	43.3	−1.1
Majority		402	13.4	+3.4
Turnout		2,990	48.8	−13.3
Labour hold		Swing		

=== St. Thomas' ===
St. Thomas'
Party	Candidate	Votes	%	±%
Labour	J. W. Bloom*	1,722	50.8	−3.4
Conservative	G. W. Smith	1,665	49.2	+3.4
Majority		57	1.6	−6.8
Turnout		3,387	51.5	−11.0
Labour hold		Swing		

=== Seedley ===
Seedley
Party	Candidate	Votes	%	±%
Independent	W. F. Cuttiford*	1,693	65.5	+4.7
Labour	F. Gardner	893	34.5	−4.7
Majority		800	31.0	+9.4
Turnout		2,963	51.3	−12.3
Independent hold		Swing		

=== Trinity ===
Trinity
Party	Candidate	Votes	%	±%
Labour	J. T. Tattersall	1,501	52.7	−4.7
Independent	T. William Richardson*	1,345	47.3	+4.7
Majority		156	5.4	−9.4
Turnout		2,846	47.5	−11.3
Labour gain from Independent		Swing		

=== Weaste ===
Weaste
Party	Candidate	Votes	%	±%
Conservative	T. Nuttall*	1,650	62.5	+2.1
Labour	K. Grant	990	37.5	−2.1
Majority		660	25.0	+4.2
Turnout		2,640	43.3	−10.2
Conservative hold		Swing		

== Aldermanic elections ==
=== Aldermanic election, 9 November 1929 ===
At the meeting of the council on 9 November 1929, the terms of office of eight aldermen expired.

The following eight were elected as aldermen by the council on 9 November 1929 for a term of six years.

Party	Alderman	Ward	Term expires
Liberal	George Barker*		1935
Independent	Samuel Delves*		1935
Conservative	William Greenwood*	Crescent	1935
Conservative	Frederick Hampson*		1935
Conservative	Robert Hopwood*		1935
Liberal	William Hughes*		1935
Conservative	S. H. Lees*		1935
Liberal	J. Willett*		1935

== By-elections between 1929 and 1930 ==
=== St. Paul's, 21 May 1930 ===
Caused by the resignation of Councillor Fred Jones (Labour, St. Paul's, elected 2 November 1925) on 7 May 1930.

St. Paul's
Party	Candidate	Votes	%	±%
Labour	W. Neil	1,308	50.5	−6.2
Conservative	E. J. Delves	1,281	49.5	+6.2
Majority		27	1.0	−12.4
Turnout		2,990		
Labour hold		Swing		

=== Langworthy, 1 July 1930 ===
Caused by the death of Councillor Edward Edis Dale (Labour, Langworthy, elected 1 November 1920) on 14 May 1930.

Langworthy
Party	Candidate	Votes	%	±%
Conservative	G. Fearnehough	1,713	56.3	+15.8
Labour	H. S. Vickers	1,328	43.7	−15.8
Majority		385	12.6	
Turnout		3,041		
Conservative gain from Labour		Swing		
