= County Borough of Salford =

Former district of England

Coordinates: 53.49°N 2.29°W

City of Salford County Borough of Salford
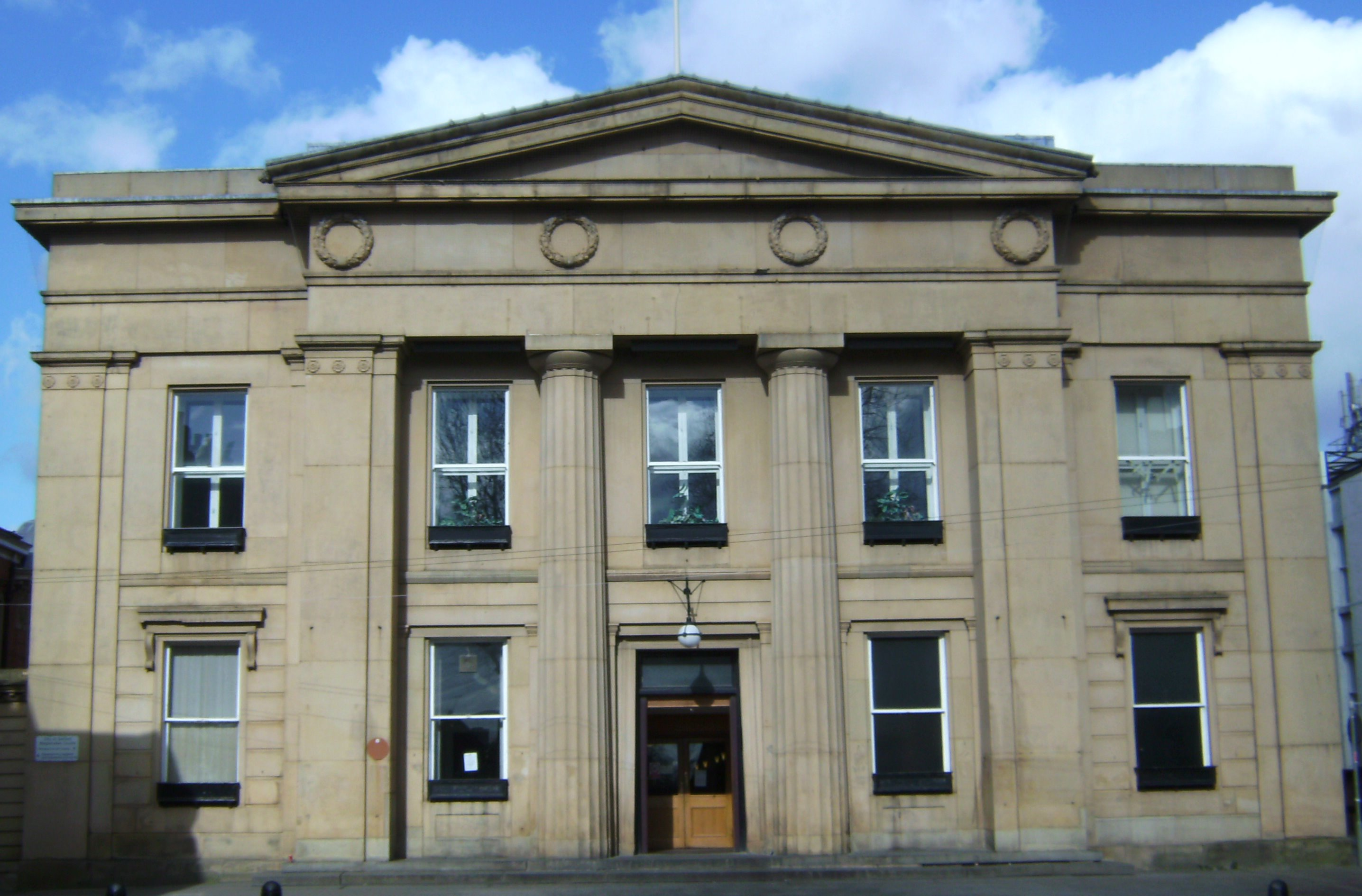
- Salford Town Hall (until 31 March 1974)
- Area
  - 1861: 5,170 acres (2,090 ha)
  - 1921: 5,202 acres (2,105 ha)
  - 1961: 5,205 acres (2,106 ha)
- Population
  - 1861: 102,449
  - 1901: 162,452
  - 1971: 131,006
- History
  - Created: 1844; 182 years ago
  - Abolished: 1974; 52 years ago
  - Succeeded by: City of Salford
- Status: Municipal borough 1844–1889; County borough 1889–1974 & City 1926–1974
- Government
  - Motto: Integrity and Industry

Salford was, from 1844 to 1974, a local government district in the county of Lancashire in the northwest of England, covering the city of Salford. It was granted city status in 1926.

== History ==
=== Free Borough and Police Commissioners ===
In about 1230, the vill of Salford, Lancashire, was created a free borough by charter granted by Ranulph de Blondeville, 4th Earl of Chester. The borough's government was in the hands of a borough-reeve and portmote court. The reeve was elected by the burgesses at large, while the head of the Molyneux family of Sefton presided over the court as hereditary steward of the Hundred of Salford.

The first modern local government was established in the area when the Manchester and Salford Police Act 1792 (32 Geo. 3. c. 69) created commissioners to administer the two towns. In 1843 the inhabitant householders petitioned the Privy Council for a charter of incorporation under the Municipal Corporations Act 1835 The charter was granted on 16 April 1844, and the Municipal Borough of Salford came into existence on 1 November.

=== Municipal borough ===
The borough originally consisted of the township of Salford and the part of Broughton township south of the River Irwell. It was divided into four wards (Blackfriars, Crescent, St Stephen's and Trinity), with a town council consisting of a mayor, eight aldermen and twenty-four councillors. In 1853 the borough was extended to include the rest of Broughton and Pendleton township. The wards of the borough were redrawn and increased in number to sixteen. Salford township was divided into seven wards, Broughton into three and Pendleton into six. Each ward was represented by three councillors and one alderman, and the size of the council consequently increased to forty-eight councillors and sixteen aldermen. The names of the wards were as follows: Albert Park, Charlestown, Crescent, Grosvenor, Hope, Islington, Kersal, Ordsall, Regent, St Matthias's, St Paul's, St Thomas's, Seedley, Trafford, Trinity and Weaste.

=== County borough and city ===
Under the Local Government Act 1888 all municipal boroughs with a population of 50,000 or more were designated as "county boroughs" with the powers of both a municipal borough and a county council. In 1889, therefore, the town became the County Borough of Salford. Although independent of Lancashire County Council, Salford remained part of the county for certain purposes such as lieutenancy, shrievalty, custos rotulorum and administration of justice.

The size of the borough council did not change, although the wards were reorganised in 1921. The wards, which remained until the borough's abolition were as follows: No.1 or Charlestown, No.2 or Kersal, No.3 or Mandley Park, No.4 or Albert Park, No.5 or St Matthias's, No.6 or Trinity, No.7 or Crescent, No.8 or Regent, No.9 or Ordsall Park, No.10 or Docks, No.11 or St. Thomas's, No.12 or St Paul's, No.13 or Langworthy, No.14 or Seedley, No.15 or Weaste and No.16 or Claremont.

Following a campaign supported by William Joynson-Hicks, Home Secretary and MP for a neighbouring constituency of Manchester, city status was granted to the county borough by letters patent dated 21 April 1926. This was in spite of the opposition of civil servants in the Home Office who dismissed the borough as "merely a scratch collection of 240,000 people cut off from Manchester by the river".

The City and County Borough of Salford was abolished in 1974 by the Local Government Act 1972 and its territory transferred to Greater Manchester to form part of the metropolitan borough and City of Salford. At abolition the county borough was surrounded by the City and county Borough of Manchester to the east, the Municipal Borough of Swinton and Pendlebury to the northwest, the Municipal Borough of Eccles to the southwest, and the Municipal Borough of Stretford to the south.

The corporation progressively accumulated increased powers and responsibilities through government legislation and by the promotion of private parliamentary bills. The range of activities in which it was involved can be ascertained by the large number of committees of the borough council in 1909: Buildings and Bridges; Cemeteries; Education; Electricity; Health; Highways and Paving; Improvement; Lighting and cleaning; Museums, Libraries and Parks; Parliamentary and Public Trusts; River Irwell Consevancy; Town Halls and Markets; Tramways; Watch (police) and Water.

=== Political control ===
Elections to the borough council were held annually, with one third of councillors being elected each year. Aldermen had a six-year term of office, with one half of their number being elected by the council every three years. As was common in borough elections throughout England, early elections were often uncontested, with agreed candidates being elected unopposed. As late as 1883 only two wards were contested. Although party labels were not used, there were in fact two groupings on the council, aligned to the parliamentary Conservative and Liberal parties. Conservatives were in a majority until 1892 when the two groups reached parity, with an independent councillor holding the balance of power. The Conservatives regained power in 1893, and by 1894 the Liberal grouping had divided into "Gladstonians" and "Radicals", with the Independent Labour Party contesting seats in their own right.

Conservatives and other Unionist members maintained a large majority until 1919. In that year the Labour Party gained five seats, leaving the council evenly divided between Conservatives and Liberal-Labour. There was thereafter no single party in power for a number of years, with Conservative, Labour, Liberal and Independent groups represented. In 1931 the Conservatives gained control for three years, before the council returned to no overall control. Following the cancellation of elections for the duration of World War II, a Labour landslide saw the party gain a majority for the first time. Labour held the council with a large majority for more than twenty years until the Conservatives returned to power in 1968. Three years later the Conservatives lost power. The final election prior to abolition was held in 1972, and saw Labour regain a majority.

== Coat of arms ==
The mayor, aldermen and burgesses of the Borough of Salford were granted arms and crest on 5 November 1844, and on the following day received a further grant of heraldic supporters. The blazon was as follows:

Azure semee of bees volant a shuttle between three garbs Or on a chief of the last a bale corded proper between two millrinds sable; and for a Crest: On a wreath of the colours a demi lion argent supporting a lance proper therefrom flowing to the sinister a flag azure charged with a shuttle Or.

Supporters: On the dexter side a wolf Or around the neck a chain and pendent therefrom an escocheon gules charged with a millrind also Or on the sinister side an heraldic antelope argent armed crined and unguled Or around the neck a chain and pendent therefrom an escocheon gules charged with a rose also argent.

The basis of the shield are the three gold wheatsheaves on a blue field of the Earldom of Chester. To this were added a bale for the cotton industry, millrinds for the production of iron, a shuttle for weaving and bees for industry in general. The crest was a half-lion supporting a banner bearing a shuttle. The supporters were a wolf, an emblem of the early Earls of Chester; and an heraldic antelope from the arms of the Beaufort family, representing the Duchy of Lancaster. The arms granted to Manchester two years earlier had a similar supporter for the same reason.

The motto was Integrity and Industry.

On 15 September 1959 the corporation received the grant of an heraldic badge:

Within a collar argent fimbriated Or set thereon four roses gules barbed and seeded proper and as many letters S also gules alternately a hurt thereon issuant from a wreath of sallow a demi lion also argent.

The "collar of SS" was derived from the insignia of the Duchy of Lancaster, while the red rose of Lancaster was from Lancashire. The sallow leaves referred to the derivation of the name "Salford" from "Sallow Ford". The lion was taken from the crest.

== Police force ==
As required by the Municipal Corporations Act 1835, one of the first actions of the newly created town council was to appoint a Watch Committee to establish a police force, Salford Borough Police, and appoint a chief constable. In 1928 the force introduced police boxes to the streets of Salford. Following inspection by the Metropolitan Police, similar boxes were erected in London. The Police Act 1964 allowed for the compulsory amalgamation of police forces, and on 1 June 1968 the Manchester and Salford city constabularies formed the Manchester and Salford Police.

== Salford Corporation Transport ==
In 1875, the corporations of Manchester and Salford gained powers under the Tramways Act 1870 (33 & 34 Vict. c. 78) to construct a horse tramway network. Services started on 17 May 1877, with a private company, the Manchester Carriage Company (later Manchester Carriage and Tramways Company) operating services on a 21-year lease. The lease was eventually extended until 1901, with Manchester taking over their portion of the network on 27 April and Salford on 2 May. The lines were quickly electrified, with work completed by 1903, and the system was extended to Worsley in 1906. Through services were operated over the lines of neighbouring municipalities, reaching Middleton and Swinton and Pendlebury

In 1920 Salford commenced motorbus operation, and the first tram routes were withdrawn in 1932. The last tram went out of service on 31 March 1947. By this time the undertaking had been renamed Salford City Transport. On 1 November 1969 SCT was merged into the SELNEC Passenger Transport Executive.

== Local elections ==
- 1919 Salford Borough Council election
- 1920 Salford Borough Council election
- 1921 Salford Borough Council election
- 1922 Salford Borough Council election
- 1923 Salford Borough Council election
- 1924 Salford Borough Council election
- 1925 Salford Borough Council election
- 1926 Salford City Council election
- 1927 Salford City Council election
- 1928 Salford City Council election
- 1929 Salford City Council election
- 1930 Salford City Council election
- 1931 Salford City Council election
- 1932 Salford City Council election
- 1933 Salford City Council election
- 1934 Salford City Council election
- 1935 Salford City Council election
- 1936 Salford City Council election
- 1937 Salford City Council election
- 1938 Salford City Council election
- 1945 Salford City Council election
- 1946 Salford City Council election
- 1947 Salford City Council election
- 1949 Salford City Council election
- 1950 Salford City Council election
- 1951 Salford City Council election
- 1952 Salford City Council election
- 1953 Salford City Council election
- 1954 Salford City Council election
- 1955 Salford City Council election
- 1956 Salford City Council election
- 1957 Salford City Council election
- 1958 Salford City Council election
- 1959 Salford City Council election
- 1960 Salford City Council election
- 1961 Salford City Council election
- 1962 Salford City Council election
- 1963 Salford City Council election
- 1964 Salford City Council election
- 1965 Salford City Council election
- 1966 Salford City Council election
- 1967 Salford City Council election
- 1968 Salford City Council election
- 1969 Salford City Council election
- 1970 Salford City Council election
- 1971 Salford City Council election
- 1972 Salford City Council election
