= Tom McCarthy (trade unionist) =

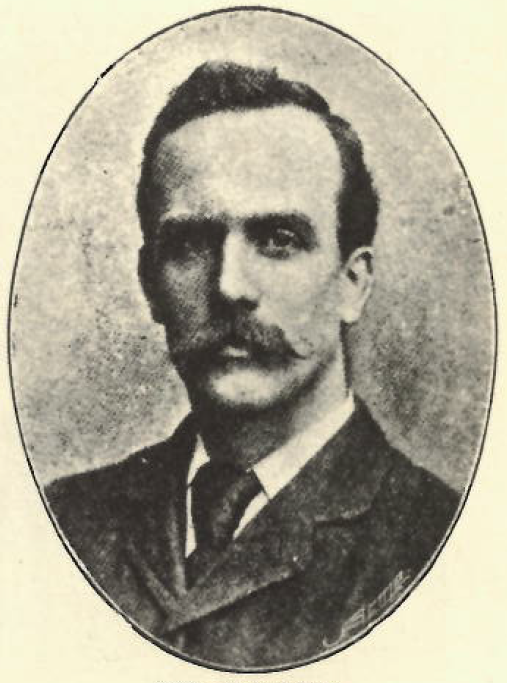
McCarthy, shortly before his death

Thomas McCarthy (c. 1862 – 19 September 1899) was a British Irish trade unionist, who became prominent as a leader of dockers in England.

Born in Limehouse to parents from Ireland, McCarthy initially worked at a local shipbuilding yard. This industry was in decline, and he moved to become a carman, before finding work as a stevedore at the local docks. He joined the Amalgamated Stevedores' Labour Protection League in 1879, and in 1885, he was elected as the union's secretary. The post paid only £0.17 (equivalent to £23.19 in 2023) a week, so he continued to work on the docks for his primary income.

The Stevedores' Union was a conservative organisation, taking little interest in current events, and focusing on restricting the admission of new members such that the total number of stevedores did not increase. McCarthy believed that its members would be in a stronger position if all workers at the docks were unionised, and he strongly supported Ben Tillett's efforts in forming the Tea Operatives' and General Labourers' Association.

Discontent over bonus payments in the docks arose in August 1889, and McCarthy gave a speech on 12 August alongside Will Thorne, urging workers at the South Dock, Rotherhithe, to form a union and go on strike. This occurred, and although initially Tillett's union was concerned that they had been bypassed, they soon joined, and with some difficulty, McCarthy also persuaded his union, and the rival United Society of Stevedores, to join the strike. It had now become the major London dock strike of 1889, which succeeded in obtaining increased wages for dock workers, and inspired a wave of new trade unions across the country.

Immediately after the strike, McCarthy was removed from his post by the executive of the Stevedores. Instead, he took up a full-time post as an organiser for Tillett's union, now renamed as the "Dock, Wharf, Riverside and General Labourers' Union". He and Harry Orbell were the union's two organisers, also serving on its executive, and they were credited with maintaining the strength of the union after the strike.

In 1891, McCarthy was asked to stand as a Parliamentary candidate for the Irish National League, but he rejected the offer, as he was a socialist. He was a founder of the Independent Labour Party (ILP) in 1893 and, inspired by a strike led by his union in Hull, they selected him as the party's candidate for Kingston upon Hull West. However, he had no connection with the city and although he attracted support from the local branches of the Amalgamated Society of Carpenters and Joiners and the Amalgamated Society of Railway Servants, Frederick Maddison, a Liberal trade union leader, persuaded much of the city's labour movement to back the incumbent, Charles Wilson. No Conservative Party candidate contested the seat at the 1895 UK general election, while McCarthy lost heavily to Wilson, taking only 17.4% of the votes cast. Maddison attempted to capitalise on this by arguing that Hull dockers should break away from the London-based union and form a local society, an idea which McCarthy and Tillett successfully argued against.

McCarthy died suddenly in September 1899. He was buried at Tower Hamlets Cemetery.

Trade union offices
Preceded by New position	National Organiser of the Dock, Wharf, Riverside and General Labourers' Union; 1889–1899; With: Harry Orbell	Succeeded by Harry Orbell
