= Orbell =

Orbell is a surname, and may refer to:

- David Orbell (born 1963), Australian swimmer
- Geoffrey Orbell (1908–2007), New Zealand physician
- Harry Orbell (1860–1914), British trade unionist
- Margaret Orbell (1935–2006), New Zealand author and academic
