= 1917 Salford North by-election =

UK Parliamentary by-election

Sir William Byles

The 1917 Salford North by-election was held on 2 November 1917. The by-election was held due to the death of the incumbent Liberal MP, Sir William Byles. It was won by the Independent Labour Party candidate Ben Tillett.

Charles Mallet

Salford North by-election, 1917
Party	Candidate	Votes	%	±%
Independent Labour	Ben Tillett	2,822	64.6	New
Liberal	Charles Mallet	1,545	35.4	−16.0
Majority		1,277	29.2	N/A
Turnout		4,367	41.1	−45.9
Independent Labour gain from Liberal		Swing		
