= 1934 Salford City Council election =

Local election in Salford

- 1 November 1934

16 of 64 seats on Salford City Council 33 seats needed for a majority
	First party	Second party	Third party
Party	Labour	Conservative	Liberal
Last election	8 seats, 53.1%	7 seats, 31.8%	0 seats, 4.9%
Seats before	21	31	6
Seats won	8	7	0
Seats after	27	26	6
Seat change	▲6	▼5	Steady
Popular vote	21,558	18,880	0
Percentage	51.2%	42.8%	0.0%
Swing	▼1.9%	▲11.0%	▼4.9%
	Fourth party
Party	Independent
Last election	1 seats, 9.9%
Seats before	6
Seats won	1
Seats after	5
Seat change	▼1
Popular vote	2,543
Percentage	5.8%
Swing	▼4.1%
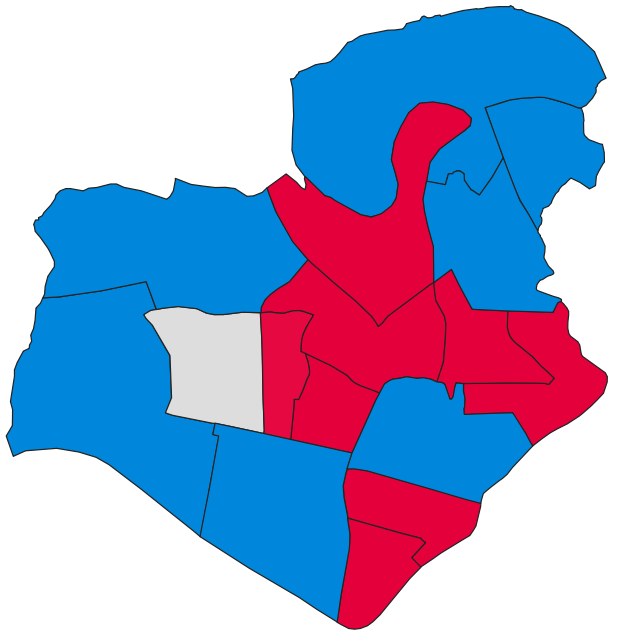
- Map of results of 1934 election
Leader of the Council before election
No overall control
Leader of the Council after election
No overall control

Elections to Salford City Council were held on Thursday, 1 November 1934. One-third of the councillors seats were up for election, with each successful candidate to serve a three-year term of office. The council remained under no overall control.

== Election result ==
Party	Votes		Seats			Full Council	
Labour Party	22,558 (51.2%)	▼1.9	8 (50.0%)	8 / 16	▲6	27 (42.2%)	27 / 64
Conservative Party	18,880 (42.8%)	▲11.0	7 (43.8%)	7 / 16	▼5	26 (40.6%)	26 / 64
Liberal Party	0 (0.0%)	▼4.9	0 (0.0%)	0 / 16	Steady	6 (9.4%)	6 / 64
Independent	2,543 (5.8%)	▼4.1	1 (6.3%)	1 / 16	▼1	5 (7.8%)	5 / 64
Communist	81 (0.2%)	▼0.1	0 (0.0%)	0 / 16	Steady	0 (0.0%)	0 / 64

=== Full council ===
↓
27	6	5	26

=== Aldermen ===
↓
6	1	9

=== Councillors ===
↓
27	4	17

== Ward results ==
=== Albert Park ===
Albert Park
Party	Candidate	Votes	%	±%
Conservative	H. Bescoby	1,532	52.5	N/A
Labour	S. W. Davies	1,385	47.5	−8.1
Majority		147	5.0	
Turnout		2,917		
Conservative hold		Swing		

=== Charlestown ===
Charlestown
Party	Candidate	Votes	%	±%
Labour	J. H. Kearns	2,303	52.5	−10.1
Conservative	A. Worsley*	2,082	47.5	N/A
Majority		221	5.0	−20.2
Turnout		4,385		
Labour gain from Conservative		Swing		

=== Claremont ===
Claremont
Party	Candidate	Votes	%	±%
Conservative	A. H. Lyons*	1,897	65.5	−4.6
Labour	F. E. Monks	998	34.5	+4.6
Majority		899	31.0	−9.2
Turnout		2,895		
Conservative hold		Swing		

=== Crescent ===
Crescent
Party	Candidate	Votes	%	±%
Conservative	J. W. Fieldsend*	1,619	50.3	+5.8
Labour	F. J. Lynch	1,598	49.7	−5.8
Majority		21	0.6	
Turnout		3,217		
Conservative hold		Swing		

=== Docks ===
Docks
Party	Candidate	Votes	%	±%
Conservative	F. Morris	1,400	52.8	+2.2
Labour	W. Crosby*	1,254	47.2	−2.2
Majority		146	5.6	+4.4
Turnout		2,654		
Conservative gain from Labour		Swing		

=== Kersal ===
Kersal
Party	Candidate	Votes	%	±%
Conservative	A. Hodgson*	uncontested		
Conservative hold		Swing		

=== Langworthy ===
Langworthy
Party	Candidate	Votes	%	±%
Labour	R. J. Hurst	1,611	50.7	+2.1
Conservative	C. R. V. Haynes*	1,567	49.3	−2.1
Majority		44	1.4	
Turnout		3,187		
Labour gain from Conservative		Swing		

=== Mandley Park ===
Mandley Park
Party	Candidate	Votes	%	±%
Conservative	H. Kitchen*	1,521	50.4	−0.4
Labour	J. Jackson	1,499	49.6	+0.4
Majority		22	0.8	−0.8
Turnout		3,020		
Conservative hold		Swing		

=== Ordsall Park ===
Ordsall Park
Party	Candidate	Votes	%	±%
Labour	G. H. Goulden	1,951	69.7	+0.5
Conservative	T. Heald	847	30.3	−0.5
Majority		1,104	39.4	+1.0
Turnout		2,798		
Labour gain from Conservative		Swing		

=== Regent ===
Regent
Party	Candidate	Votes	%	±%
Labour	E. Cuddeford	2,040	61.6	+0.2
Conservative	R. Heywood	1,273	38.4	+1.3
Majority		767	23.2	−1.1
Turnout		3,313		
Labour hold		Swing		

=== St. Matthias' ===
St. Matthias'
Party	Candidate	Votes	%	±%
Labour	W. Greenwood	1,848	61.1	+6.5
Independent	A. C. Dixon*	1,098	36.3	−7.3
Communist	R. Davies	81	2.6	+0.8
Majority		750	24.8	+13.8
Turnout		3,027		
Labour gain from Independent		Swing		

=== St. Paul's ===
St. Paul's
Party	Candidate	Votes	%	±%
Labour	J. H. Lester	1,432	52.5	−9.7
Conservative	C. P. Hampson*	1,297	47.5	+9.7
Majority		135	5.0	−19.4
Turnout		2,729		
Labour gain from Conservative		Swing		

=== St. Thomas' ===
St. Thomas'
Party	Candidate	Votes	%	±%
Labour	H. Ingle	1,382	51.9	+4.0
Conservative	A. F. Carroll*	1,281	48.1	−4.0
Majority		101	3.8	
Turnout		2,663		
Labour gain from Conservative		Swing		

=== Seedley ===
Seedley
Party	Candidate	Votes	%	±%
Independent	P. Ashcroft*	1,445	62.2	+5.0
Labour	I. Copson	877	37.8	−5.0
Majority		568	24.4	+10.0
Turnout		2,322		
Independent hold		Swing		

=== Trinity ===
Trinity
Party	Candidate	Votes	%	±%
Labour	J. Lemmon	1,391	52.7	−4.0
Conservative	F. T. B. Luckman	1,250	47.3	+4.0
Majority		141	5.4	−8.0
Turnout		2,641		
Labour gain from Conservative		Swing		

=== Weaste ===
Weaste
Party	Candidate	Votes	%	±%
Conservative	J. Binns*	1,314	57.1	−6.3
Labour	J. Openshaw	989	42.9	+6.3
Majority		325	14.2	−12.6
Turnout		2,303		
Conservative hold		Swing		

== Aldermanic elections ==
=== Aldermanic election, 6 February 1935 ===
Caused by the death on 19 January 1935 of Alderman George Hindle (Liberal, elected as an alderman by the council on 1 April 1931).

In his place, Councillor J. F. Crane (Labour, Charlestown, elected 1 November 1932; previously 1919-31) was elected as an alderman by the council on 6 February 1935.

Party	Alderman	Ward	Term expires
Labour	J. F. Crane	Regent	1938

=== Aldermanic election, 5 June 1935 ===
Caused by the death on 26 April 1935 of Alderman Samuel Finburgh (Conservative, elected as an alderman by the council on 7 January 1931).

In his place, Councillor Edward Arthur Hardy (Labour, Regent, elected 1 November 1932; previously 1922-23 and 1923-31) was elected as an alderman by the council on 5 June 1935.

Party	Alderman	Ward	Term expires
Labour	Edward Arthur Hardy		1935

== By-elections between 1934 and 1935 ==
=== Weaste, 31 January 1935 ===
Caused by the death of Councillor Thomas Nuttall (Conservative, Weaste, elected 18 January 1928) on 25 December 1934.

Weaste
Party	Candidate	Votes	%	±%
Conservative	A. G. Wild	1,260	57.6	+0.5
Labour	W. Dixon	926	42.4	−0.5
Majority		334	15.2	+1.0
Turnout		2,186		
Conservative hold		Swing		

=== Charlestown, 17 February 1935 ===
Caused by the election as an alderman of Councillor J. F. Crane (Labour, Charlestown, elected 1 November 1932; previously 1919-31) on 6 February 1935, following the death on 19 January 1935 of Alderman George Hindle (Liberal, elected as an alderman by the council on 1 April 1931).

Charlestown
Party	Candidate	Votes	%	±%
Labour	S. W. Davis	uncontested		
Labour hold		Swing		
