= 1928 Salford City Council election =

Local election in Salford

- 1 November 1928

16 of 64 seats on Salford City Council 33 seats needed for a majority
	First party	Second party	Third party
Party	Labour	Conservative	Liberal
Last election	5 seats, 46.1%	6 seats, 35.8%	2 seats, 8.5%
Seats before	24	21	11
Seats won	9	6	0
Seats after	23	23	10
Seat change	▼1	▲2	▼1
Popular vote	27,984	25,549	0
Percentage	48.2%	44.0%	0.0%
Swing	▲2.1%	▲8.2%	▼8.5%
	Fourth party
Party	Independent
Last election	3 seats, 9.6%
Seats before	8
Seats won	1
Seats after	8
Seat change	Steady
Popular vote	4,477
Percentage	7.7%
Swing	▼1.9%
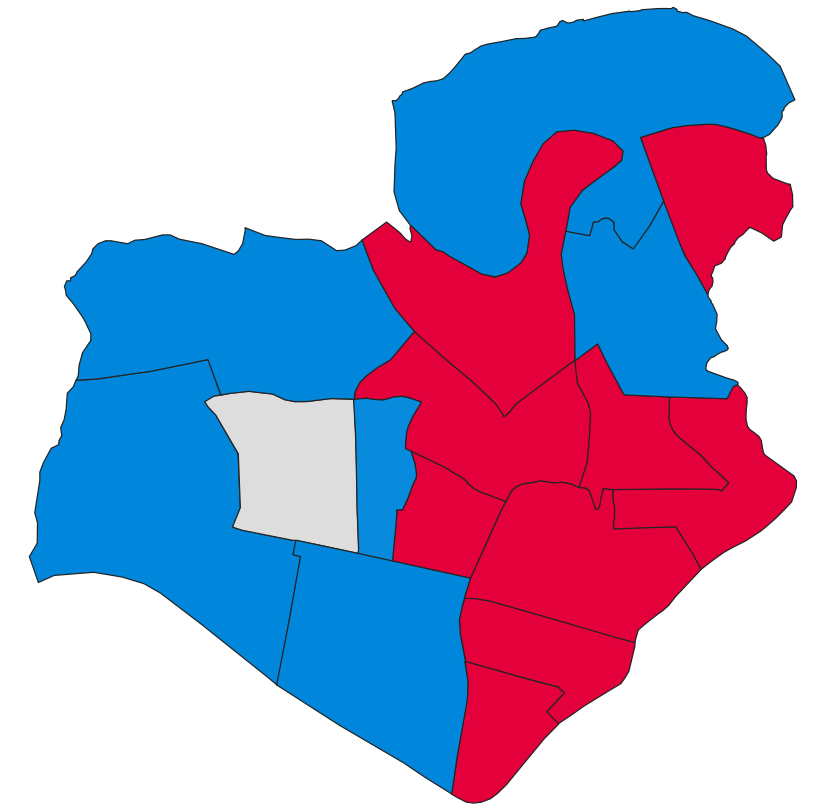
- Map of results of 1928 election
Leader of the Council before election
No overall control
Leader of the Council after election
No overall control

Elections to Salford City Council were held on Thursday, 1 November 1928. One third of the councillors seats were up for election, with each successful candidate to serve a three-year term of office. The council remained under no overall control.

== Election result ==
Party	Votes		Seats			Full Council	
Labour Party	27,984 (48.2%)	▲2.1	9 (56.3%)	9 / 16	▼1	23 (35.9%)	23 / 64
Conservative Party	25,549 (44.0%)	▲8.2	6 (37.5%)	6 / 16	▲2	23 (35.9%)	23 / 64
Liberal Party	0 (0.0%)	▼8.5	0 (0.0%)	0 / 16	▼1	10 (15.6%)	10 / 64
Independent	4,477 (7.7%)	▼1.9	1 (6.3%)	1 / 16	Steady	8 (12.5%)	8 / 64
Communist	58 (0.1%)	N/A	0 (0.0%)	0 / 16	N/A	0 (0.0%)	0 / 64

=== Full council ===
↓
23	10	8	23

=== Aldermen ===
↓
1	6	9

=== Councillors ===
↓
22	4	8	14

== Ward results ==
=== Albert Park ===
Albert Park
Party	Candidate	Votes	%	±%
Conservative	S. Finburgh M.P.*	2,608	56.6	N/A
Labour	J. A. Webb	2,002	43.4	+5.5
Majority		606	13.2	
Turnout		4,610	67.1	+8.5
Conservative hold		Swing		

=== Charlestown ===
Charlestown
Party	Candidate	Votes	%	±%
Labour	J. F. Crane*	2,478	52.4	−6.0
Conservative	H. Bescoby	2,194	46.4	+4.8
Communist	G. Staunton	58	1.2	N/A
Majority		284	6.0	−10.8
Turnout		4,730	69.8	+3.4
Labour hold		Swing		

=== Claremont ===
Claremont
Party	Candidate	Votes	%	±%
Conservative	A. H. Lyons	1,312	42.3	N/A
Independent	J. Ashworth	1,244	40.1	N/A
Labour	I. Copson	546	17.6	−4.4
Majority		68	2.2	
Turnout		3,102	69.9	+6.9
Conservative gain from Liberal		Swing		

=== Crescent ===
Crescent
Party	Candidate	Votes	%	±%
Labour	A. Millwood*	1,992	54.0	+1.6
Conservative	J. Briggs	1,699	46.0	−1.6
Majority		293	8.0	−0.2
Turnout		3,691	53.9	−0.3
Labour hold		Swing		

=== Docks ===
Docks
Party	Candidate	Votes	%	±%
Conservative	J. L. Clampitt*	1,743	54.7	−2.7
Labour	G. H. Pearson	1,441	45.3	+2.7
Majority		302	9.4	−5.4
Turnout		3,184	60.6	+1.1
Conservative hold		Swing		

=== Kersal ===
Kersal
Party	Candidate	Votes	%	±%
Conservative	J. W. Weir*	1,727	71.5	−3.0
Labour	H. Ingle	687	28.5	+3.0
Majority		1,040	43.0	−6.0
Turnout		2,414	47.5	−0.2
Conservative hold		Swing		

=== Langworthy ===
Langworthy
Party	Candidate	Votes	%	±%
Conservative	C. R. V. Haynes	1,997	51.3	+0.1
Labour	E. Corbey*	1,892	48.7	−0.1
Majority		105	2.6	+0.2
Turnout		3,889	71.8	+9.5
Conservative gain from Labour		Swing		

=== Mandley Park ===
Mandley Park
Party	Candidate	Votes	%	±%
Labour	J. Brentnall*	1,952	52.1	+8.6
Conservative	G. Fearnehough	1,762	47.9	−8.6
Majority		160	4.2	
Turnout		3,744	58.5	−3.6
Labour hold		Swing		

=== Ordsall Park ===
Ordsall Park
Party	Candidate	Votes	%	±%
Labour	J. Lemmon*	2,329	59.1	−3.5
Conservative	R. Heywood	1,613	40.9	+3.5
Majority		716	18.2	−7.0
Turnout		3,942	58.7	+6.9
Labour hold		Swing		

=== Regent ===
Regent
Party	Candidate	Votes	%	±%
Labour	J. Howard*	2,487	55.5	+6.3
Conservative	T. Catterall	1,991	44.5	N/A
Majority		496	11.0	
Turnout		4,478	64.8	+10.7
Labour hold		Swing		

=== St. Matthias' ===
St. Matthias'
Party	Candidate	Votes	%	±%
Labour	J. W. Kay*	2,091	52.5	+0.3
Conservative	F. W. Beresford	1,892	47.5	−0.3
Majority		199	5.0	+0.6
Turnout		3,983	61.0	+0.4
Labour hold		Swing		

=== St. Paul's ===
St. Paul's
Party	Candidate	Votes	%	±%
Labour	F. Jones*	1,874	54.4	−3.7
Conservative	O. A. Buck	1,529	44.4	+2.5
Independent	C. W. Renshaw	43	1.2	N/A
Majority		345	10.0	−6.2
Turnout		3,446	62.1	+7.8
Labour hold		Swing		

=== St. Thomas' ===
St. Thomas'
Party	Candidate	Votes	%	±%
Labour	J. H. Kearns*	2,009	54.2	+4.3
Conservative	T. Worrall	1,695	45.8	−4.3
Majority		314	8.4	
Turnout		3,704	62.5	−4.3
Labour hold		Swing		

=== Seedley ===
Seedley
Party	Candidate	Votes	%	±%
Independent	P. Ashcroft*	1,801	60.8	−2.3
Labour	F. Gardner	1,162	39.2	+2.3
Majority		639	21.6	−4.6
Turnout		2,963	63.6	+1.0
Independent hold		Swing		

=== Trinity ===
Trinity
Party	Candidate	Votes	%	±%
Labour	E. A. Hardy*	1,869	57.4	+10.5
Independent	E. Ainsworth	1,389	42.6	−10.5
Majority		480	14.8	
Turnout		3,258	58.8	+7.5
Labour hold		Swing		

=== Weaste ===
Weaste
Party	Candidate	Votes	%	±%
Conservative	J. Binns*	1,787	60.4	−4.2
Labour	W. Neil	1,173	39.6	+4.2
Majority		614	20.8	−8.4
Turnout		2,960	53.5	−5.6
Conservative hold		Swing		
