= 1930 Salford City Council election =

Local election in Salford

- 1 November 1930

16 of 64 seats on Salford City Council 33 seats needed for a majority
	First party	Second party	Third party
Party	Conservative	Labour	Liberal
Last election	2 seats, 24.1%	10 seats, 49.7%	2 seats, 10.4%
Seats before	23	23	10
Seats won	9	1	3
Seats after	27	18	11
Seat change	▲4	▼5	▲1
Popular vote	17,088	20,836	5,080
Percentage	33.5%	40.8%	10.3%
Swing	▲9.4%	▼8.9%	▼0.1%
	Fourth party
Party	Independent
Last election	2 seats, 15.8%
Seats before	8
Seats won	3
Seats after	8
Seat change	Steady
Popular vote	7,752
Percentage	15.5%
Swing	▼0.3%
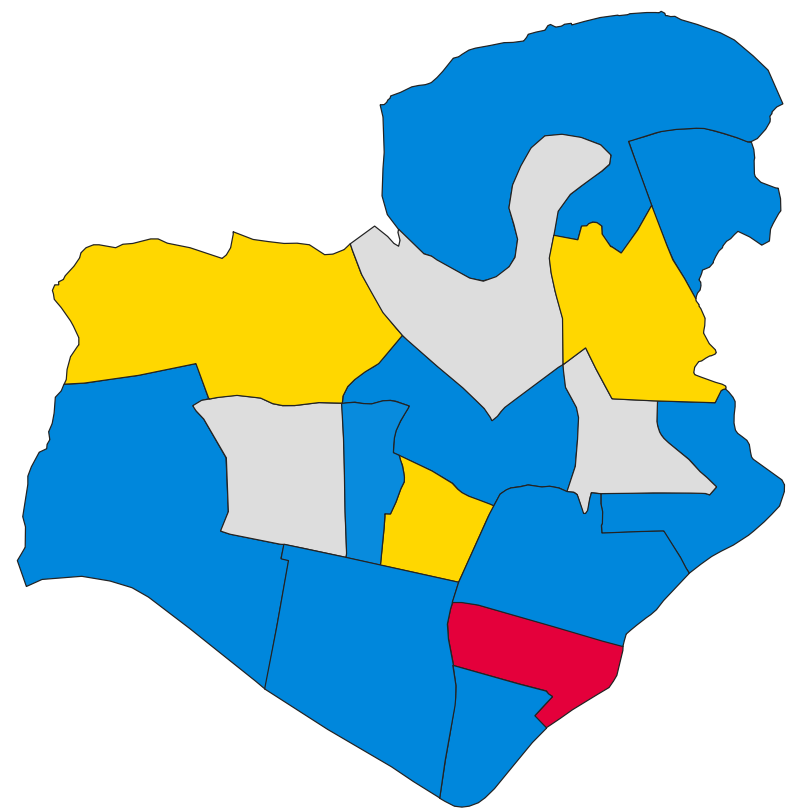
- Map of results of 1930 election
Leader of the Council before election
No overall control
Leader of the Council after election
No overall control

Elections to Salford City Council were held on Saturday, 1 November 1930. One third of the councillors seats were up for election, with each successful candidate to serve a three-year term of office. The council remained under no overall control.

== Election result ==
Party	Votes		Seats			Full Council	
Conservative Party	17,088 (33.5%)	▲9.4	9 (56.3%)	9 / 16	▲4	27 (42.2%)	27 / 64
Labour Party	20,836 (40.8%)	▼8.9	1 (6.3%)	1 / 16	▼5	18 (28.1%)	18 / 64
Liberal Party	5,233 (10.3%)	▼0.1	3 (18.8%)	3 / 16	▲1	11 (17.2%)	11 / 64
Independent	7,892 (15.5%)	▼0.3	3 (18.8%)	3 / 16	Steady	8 (12.5%)	8 / 64

=== Full council ===
↓
18	11	8	27

=== Aldermen ===
↓
6	1	9

=== Councillors ===
↓
18	5	7	18

== Ward results ==
=== Albert Park ===
Albert Park
Party	Candidate	Votes	%	±%
Liberal	G. Hindle*	2,128	62.8	N/A
Labour	A. M. Atherton	1,262	37.2	−11.8
Majority		866	25.6	
Turnout		3,390		
Liberal hold		Swing		

=== Charlestown ===
Charlestown
Party	Candidate	Votes	%	±%
Independent	T. H. Nightingale	2,382	54.7	N/A
Labour	J. J. Richardson*	1,973	45.3	−9.9
Majority		409	9.4	
Turnout		4,355		
Independent gain from Labour		Swing		

=== Claremont ===
Claremont
Party	Candidate	Votes	%	±%
Liberal	J. Connolly*	1,869	79.1	+0.7
Labour	J. Openshaw	495	20.9	−0.7
Majority		1,374	58.2	+1.4
Turnout		2,364		
Liberal hold		Swing		

=== Crescent ===
Crescent
Party	Candidate	Votes	%	±%
Conservative	J. Briggs	2,112	56.4	N/A
Labour	A. Worthington*	1,630	43.6	−0.3
Majority		482	12.8	
Turnout		3,742		
Conservative gain from Labour		Swing		

=== Docks ===
Docks
Party	Candidate	Votes	%	±%
Conservative	J. T. Harrison*	1,799	60.1	+13.6
Labour	J. H. R. Caldwell	1,193	39.9	−13.6
Majority		606	20.2	
Turnout		2,992		
Conservative hold		Swing		

=== Kersal ===
Kersal
Party	Candidate	Votes	%	±%
Conservative	W. Crookell*	1,692	79.2	N/A
Labour	H. Watson	445	20.8	−8.8
Majority		1,247	58.4	
Turnout		2,137		
Conservative hold		Swing		

=== Langworthy ===
Langworthy
Party	Candidate	Votes	%	±%
Conservative	T. W. Buck*	1,843	58.2	+17.7
Labour	P. Moulson	1,325	41.8	−17.7
Majority		518	16.4	
Turnout		3,168		
Conservative hold		Swing		

=== Mandley Park ===
Mandley Park
Party	Candidate	Votes	%	±%
Conservative	W. Armstrong*	1,985	58.7	+13.1
Labour	H. Ingle	1,399	41.3	−13.1
Majority		586	17.4	
Turnout		3,384		
Conservative hold		Swing		

=== Ordsall Park ===
Ordsall Park
Party	Candidate	Votes	%	±%
Conservative	T. Heald	1,896	50.1	N/A
Labour	G. W. Sands*	1,894	49.9	−17.0
Majority		2	0.2	
Turnout		3,790		
Conservative gain from Labour		Swing		

=== Regent ===
Regent
Party	Candidate	Votes	%	±%
Labour	B. Broughton	1,751	50.5	−6.1
Independent	G. R. Greatorex*	1,719	49.5	N/A
Majority		32	1.0	−12.2
Turnout		3,470		
Labour gain from Independent		Swing		

=== St. Matthias' ===
St. Matthias'
Party	Candidate	Votes	%	±%
Independent	T. William Richardson	2,062	55.4	+11.0
Labour	F. Cowin*	1,659	44.6	−11.0
Majority		403	10.8	
Turnout		3,721		
Independent gain from Labour		Swing		

=== St. Paul's ===
St. Paul's
Party	Candidate	Votes	%	±%
Liberal	D. Worrall	1,236	51.6	N/A
Labour	T. Wilber*	1,158	48.4	−8.3
Majority		78	3.2	
Turnout		2,394		
Liberal gain from Labour		Swing		

=== St. Thomas' ===
St. Thomas'
Party	Candidate	Votes	%	±%
Conservative	G. W. Smith	2,103	55.7	+6.5
Labour	F. E. Monks*	1,673	44.3	−6.5
Majority		430	11.4	
Turnout		3,776		
Conservative gain from Labour		Swing		

=== Seedley ===
Seedley
Party	Candidate	Votes	%	±%
Independent	C. J. Townsend*	1,729	65.1	−0.4
Labour	J. S. Hooton	928	34.9	+0.4
Majority		801	30.2	−0.8
Turnout		2,657		
Independent hold		Swing		

=== Trinity ===
Trinity
Party	Candidate	Votes	%	±%
Conservative	F. T. B. Luckman	1,639	56.1	N/A
Labour	M. Tyler	1,284	43.9	−8.8
Majority		355	12.2	
Turnout		2,923		
Conservative gain from Independent		Swing		

=== Weaste ===
Weaste
Party	Candidate	Votes	%	±%
Conservative	J. F. Emery*	2,019	72.5	+10.0
Labour	I. Copson	767	27.5	−10.0
Majority		1,252	45.0	+20.0
Turnout		2,786		
Conservative hold		Swing		

== Aldermanic elections ==
=== Aldermanic elections, 7 January 1931 ===
Caused by the death on 6 December 1930 of Alderman Frederick Hampson (Conservative, elected as an alderman by the council on 9 November 1920).

In his place, Councillor Samuel Finburgh (Conservative, Albert Park, elected 10 June 1915) was elected as an alderman by the council on 7 January 1931.

Party	Alderman	Ward	Term expires
Conservative	Samuel Finburgh		1935

=== Aldermanic election, 1 April 1931 ===
Caused by the death on 3 March 1931 of Alderman F. S. Phillips (Liberal, elected as an alderman by the council on 9 November 1898).

In his place, Councillor George Hindle (Liberal, Albert Park, elected 4 July 1917) was elected as an alderman by the council on 1 April 1931.

Party	Alderman	Ward	Term expires
Liberal	George Hindle	Regent	1932

=== Aldermanic election, 12 August 1931 ===
Caused by the death on 30 June 1931 of Alderman Robert Hopwood (Conservative, elected as an alderman by the council on 31 October 1917).

In his place, Councillor A. H. Collins (Liberal, Claremont, elected 24 June 1919) was elected as an alderman by the council on 12 August 1931.

Party	Alderman	Ward	Term expires
Liberal	A. H. Collins		1935

== By-elections between 1930 and 1931 ==
=== Albert Park, 21 January 1931 ===
Caused by the election as an alderman of Councillor Samuel Finburgh (Conservative, Albert Park, elected 10 June 1915) on 7 January 1931, following the death on 6 December 1930 of Alderman Frederick Hampson (Conservative, elected as an alderman by the council on 9 November 1920).

Albert Park
Party	Candidate	Votes	%	±%
Conservative	T. O. Smith	1,630	61.0	N/A
Labour	H. O. Jones	1,041	39.0	+1.8
Majority		589	22.0	
Turnout		2,671		
Conservative hold		Swing		

=== Albert Park, 22 April 1931 ===
Caused by the election as an alderman of Councillor George Hindle (Liberal, Albert Park, elected 4 July 1917) on 1 April 1931, following the death on 3 March 1931 of Alderman F. S. Phillips (Liberal, elected as an alderman by the council on 9 November 1898).

Albert Park
Party	Candidate	Votes	%	±%
Liberal	E. Dulberg	1,727	63.1	+0.3
Labour	H. O. Jones	1,010	36.9	−0.3
Majority		717	26.2	+0.6
Turnout		2,737		
Liberal hold		Swing		

=== Claremont, 26 August 1931 ===
Caused by the election as an alderman of Councillor A. H. Collins (Liberal, Claremont, elected 24 June 1919) on 12 August 1931, following the death on 30 June 1931 of Alderman Robert Hopwood (Conservative, elected as an alderman by the council on 31 October 1917).

Claremont
Party	Candidate	Votes	%	±%
Independent	J. A. Turner	1,579	81.2	N/A
Labour	J. Openshaw	365	18.8	−2.1
Majority		1,214	62.4	
Turnout		1,944		
Independent gain from Liberal		Swing		
