= William McAdam (British politician) =

British politician

William McAdam (7 August 1886 – 22 April 1952) was a British politician.

McAdam was educated in Ecclefechan, then became a worker on the railways. He served in the British Army during World War I, then returned to his former career, becoming active in the National Union of Railwaymen (NUR). He rose to become branch secretary, then a member of the union's National Executive Committee, and also its district auditor.

McAdam also became active in the Labour Party, standing unsuccessfully in the 1935 Edinburgh West by-election, and in Salford North at the 1935 United Kingdom general election. However, he won the seat at the 1945 United Kingdom general election, serving until 1950, when he retired. He also spent time on the Scottish Executive of the Labour Party.

Parliament of the United Kingdom
Preceded by John Patrick Morris	Member of Parliament for Salford North; 1945 – 1950	Succeeded by Constituency abolished
