= 1922 Salford Borough Council election =

Local election in Salford

- 1 November 1922

16 of 64 seats on Salford County Borough Council 33 seats needed for a majority
	First party	Second party	Third party
Party	Conservative	Liberal	Labour
Last election	5 seats, 38.7%	5 seats, 13.4%	3 seats, 34.8%
Seats before	24	19	16
Seats won	5	2	5
Seats after	24	18	13
Seat change	Steady	▼1	▼3
Popular vote	11,273	2,781	14,952
Percentage	28.1%	6.9%	37.3%
Swing	▼10.6%	▼6.5%	▲2.5%
	Fourth party	Fifth party
Party	Independent	Ratepayers
Last election	2 seats, 9.3%	1 seats, 3.6%
Seats before	4	1
Seats won	3	1
Seats after	7	2
Seat change	▲3	▲1
Popular vote	9,625	1,423
Percentage	24.0%	3.6%
Swing	▲14.7%	Steady
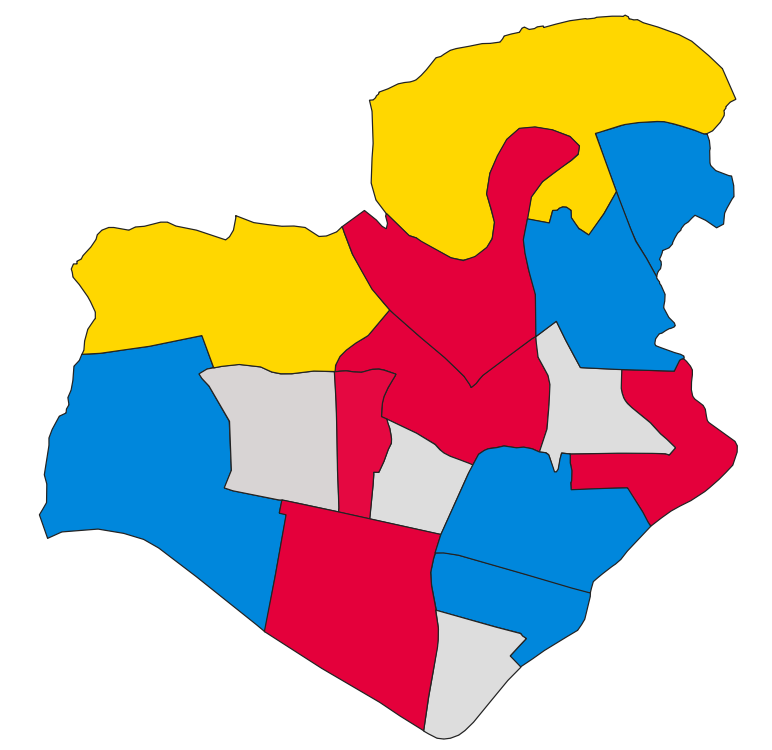
- Map of results of 1922 election
Leader of the Council before election
No overall control
Leader of the Council after election
No overall control

Elections to Salford Borough Council were held on Wednesday, 1 November 1922. One third of the councillors seats were up for election, with each successful candidate to serve a three-year term of office. The council remained under no overall control.

== Election result ==
Party	Votes		Seats			Full Council	
Conservative Party	11,273 (28.1%)	▼10.6	5 (31.3%)	5 / 16	Steady	24 (37.5%)	24 / 64
Liberal Party	2,781 (6.9%)	▼6.5	2 (12.5%)	2 / 16	▼1	18 (28.1%)	18 / 64
Labour Party	14,952 (37.3%)	▲2.5	5 (31.3%)	5 / 16	▼3	13 (20.3%)	13 / 64
Independent	9,625 (24.0%)	▲14.7	3 (18.8%)	3 / 16	▲3	7 (10.9%)	7 / 64
Ratepayers	1,423 (3.6%)	Steady	1 (6.3%)	1 / 16	▲1	2 (3.1%)	2 / 64

=== Full council ===
↓
13	18	7	2	24

=== Aldermen ===
↓
7	9

=== Councillors ===
↓
13	11	7	2	15

== Ward results ==
=== Albert Park ===
Albert Park
Party	Candidate	Votes	%	±%
Conservative	S. Finburgh*	2,327	64.3	N/A
Labour	J. Unsworth	1,292	35.7	N/A
Majority		1,035	28.6	N/A
Turnout		3,619		
Conservative hold		Swing		

=== Charlestown ===
Charlestown
Party	Candidate	Votes	%	±%
Labour	J. F. Crane*	1,566	38.5	−21.1
Liberal	F. Gregory*	1,560	38.4	−2.0
Independent	S. Vesty	940	23.1	N/A
Majority		6	0.1	−19.1
Turnout		4,066		
Labour gain from Liberal		Swing		

=== Claremont ===
Claremont
Party	Candidate	Votes	%	±%
Liberal	R. Johnson	uncontested		
Liberal hold		Swing		

=== Crescent ===
Crescent
Party	Candidate	Votes	%	±%
Conservative	G. Billington*	1,576	59.5	+3.1
Labour	W. H. Logan	1,074	40.5	−3.1
Majority		502	19.0	+6.2
Turnout		2,650		
Conservative hold		Swing		

=== Docks ===
Docks
Party	Candidate	Votes	%	±%
Labour	F. A. Luckarift*	uncontested		
Labour hold		Swing		

=== Kersal ===
Kersal
Party	Candidate	Votes	%	±%
Liberal	J. Blades*	1,221	62.4	N/A
Conservative	A. E. Bland	735	37.6	N/A
Majority		488	24.8	N/A
Turnout		1,956		
Liberal hold		Swing		

=== Langworthy ===
Langworthy
Party	Candidate	Votes	%	±%
Labour	E. Corbey*	1,430	66.9	−0.7
Independent	J. E. McDonald	709	33.1	N/A
Majority		721	33.8	−3.6
Turnout		2,139		
Labour hold		Swing		

=== Mandley Park ===
Mandley Park
Party	Candidate	Votes	%	±%
Conservative	W. Greenwood*	1,818	59.6	−11.7
Labour	G. Fulton	1,234	40.4	N/A
Majority		584	19.2	−23.4
Turnout		3,052		
Conservative hold		Swing		

=== Ordsall Park ===
Ordsall Park
Party	Candidate	Votes	%	±%
Independent	W. H. Parkinson	2,303	60.1	N/A
Labour	J. A. Webb	1,529	39.9	−8.5
Majority		774	20.2	
Turnout		3,832		
Independent gain from Labour		Swing		

=== Regent ===
Regent
Party	Candidate	Votes	%	±%
Conservative	J. T. Harrison	1,943	56.9	+12.3
Labour	J. Lemmon	1,473	43.1	N/A
Majority		470	13.8	
Turnout		3,416		
Conservative gain from Labour		Swing		

=== St. Matthias' ===
St. Matthias'
Party	Candidate	Votes	%	±%
Independent	T. L. Hay	2,304	55.0	N/A
Independent	M. Moylan	1,885	45.0	N/A
Majority		419	10.0	N/A
Turnout		4,189		
Independent gain from Labour		Swing		

=== St. Paul's ===
St. Paul's
Party	Candidate	Votes	%	±%
Independent	M. Shutt	1,484	58.2	N/A
Labour	J. Gorman	1,067	41.8	−17.0
Majority		417	16.4	
Turnout		2,551		
Independent gain from Labour		Swing		

=== St. Thomas' ===
St. Thomas'
Party	Candidate	Votes	%	±%
Labour	F. E. Monks	1,432	52.1	+2.8
Conservative	G. Johnson*	1,314	47.9	−2.8
Majority		118	4.2	
Turnout		2,746		
Labour gain from Conservative		Swing		

=== Seedley ===
Seedley
Party	Candidate	Votes	%	±%
Ratepayers	P. Ashcroft	1,423	61.7	N/A
Labour	D. A. Carefull	884	38.3	−4.0
Majority		539	23.4	
Turnout		2,307		
Ratepayers gain from Labour		Swing		

=== Trinity ===
Trinity
Party	Candidate	Votes	%	±%
Labour	T. B. Brandon*	1,971	55.8	+37.3
Conservative	J. W. Cain	1,560	44.2	+5.8
Majority		411	11.6	
Turnout		3,531		
Labour hold		Swing		

=== Weaste ===
Weaste
Party	Candidate	Votes	%	±%
Conservative	B. Littler*	uncontested		
Conservative hold		Swing		

== Aldermanic elections ==
=== Aldermanic election, 7 March 1923 ===
Caused by the death on 7 February 1923 of Alderman Edwin Mather (Conservative, elected as an alderman by the council on 3 October 1917).

In his place, Councillor John Rothwell (Liberal, St. Matthias', elected 1 November 1911; previously 1903-08) was elected as an alderman by the council on 7 March 1923.

Party	Alderman	Ward	Term expires
Liberal	John Rothwell		1926

=== Aldermanic election, 6 June 1923 ===
Caused by the death on 3 May 1923 of Alderman Julius Hulton (Conservative, elected as an alderman by the council on 5 August 1903).

In his place, Councillor George Billington (Conservative, Crescent, elected 1 November 1906) was elected as an alderman by the council on 6 June 1923.

Party	Alderman	Ward	Term expires
Conservative	George Billington		1926

=== Aldermanic election, 31 October 1923 ===
Caused by the death on 4 October 1923 of Alderman W. P. Burnley (Liberal, elected as an alderman by the council on 5 October 1921).

In his place, Councillor Benjamin Littler (Conservative, Weaste, elected 1 November 1906) was elected as an alderman by the council on 31 October 1923.

Party	Alderman	Ward	Term expires
Conservative	Benjamin Littler	St. Matthias'	1926

== By-elections between 1922 and 1923 ==
=== St. Matthias', 21 November 1922 ===
Caused by the election as an alderman of Councillor Joseph Willett (Liberal, St. Matthias', elected 31 January 1906) on 25 October 1922, following the resignation on 4 October 1922 of Alderman Alfred Worsley (Liberal, elected as an alderman by the council on 6 May 1903).

St. Matthias'
Party	Candidate	Votes	%	±%
Independent	M. Moylan	2,344	55.4	+10.4
Independent	C. Rothwell	1,888	44.6	−10.4
Majority		456	10.8	
Turnout		4,232		
Independent gain from Liberal		Swing		

=== St. Matthias', 27 March 1923 ===
Caused by the election as an alderman of Councillor John Rothwell (Liberal, St. Matthias', elected 1 November 1911; previously 1903-08) on 7 March 1923, following the death on 7 February 1923 of Alderman Edwin Mather (Conservative, elected as an alderman by the council on 3 October 1917).

St. Matthias'
Party	Candidate	Votes	%	±%
Conservative	J. W. Cain	1,587	58.6	N/A
Independent	J. O'Donnell	1,122	41.4	−14.0
Majority		465	17.2	
Turnout		2,709		
Conservative gain from Liberal		Swing		

=== Crescent, 22 June 1923 ===
Caused by the election as an alderman of Councillor George Billington (Conservative, Crescent, elected 1 November 1906) on 6 June 1923, following the death on 3 May 1923 of Alderman Julius Hulton (Conservative, elected as an alderman by the council on 5 August 1903).

Crescent
Party	Candidate	Votes	%	±%
Conservative	C. Gilbert	2,024	65.2	+5.7
Labour	W. H. Logan	1,079	34.8	−5.7
Majority		945	30.4	+11.4
Turnout		3,103		
Conservative hold		Swing		
