= New unionism =

Political movement

New unionism was a movement that broadened the trade union agenda by organizing unskilled workers to improve wages and working conditions. The movement is said to have started in 1889 with the London Dock Strike. These new unions replaced the friendly societies that came before them and were distinctly more militant in character, i.e. they were more willing to strike and demonstrate to get their demands. New unions also allowed unskilled workers to unionize for the first time with the idea of better working conditions and pay for casual or unskilled labor.

== History ==
=== 1880s ===
In the British trade union movement in the late 1880s, the new unions differed from the older craft unions in several respects.

- They were generally less exclusive than craft unions and attempted to recruit a wider range of workers. To encourage more workers to join, the new unions kept their entrance fees and contributions at a relatively low level. Some new unions, such as the Dockers' Union and the gasworkers, developed in the direction of general unionism.
- They recruited unskilled and semi-skilled workers, such as dockers, seamen, gasworkers and general laborers
- At the outset, the new unions were associated with militancy and willingness to take industrial action, unlike the more conciliatory craft unions. Notable strikes associated were the London matchgirls strike of 1888 and the London Dock Strike of 1889.
- Many of the new unions had leaders who espoused socialist ideas. Such leaders included Tom Mann, Ben Tillett, Will Thorne, James Larkin, and John Burns.

Later, the traditional view of the new unions as militant, fighting unions informed by socialist politics was modified. Although the new unions sponsored many large strikes in their early years, most, in fact, favored conciliation and accommodation. Similarly, although new union leaders espoused socialism, it was often of a moderate kind.

The most prominent new unions were:

- Dockers' Union
- National Union of Dock Labourers
- Gasworkers Union
- National Sailors' and Firemen's Union

=== 1980s–present ===
In 1988, US labour relations academic Charles Heckscher published The New Unionism: Employee Involvement in the Changing Corporation, one of a series of influential papers that encouraged the union movement to reconsider questions of industrial democracy. The UK Trades Union Congress ran an ambitious new unionism project from 1997 to 2003, seeking to apply a dual strategy of organizing and partnership in an attempt to reinvigorate the movement. The decline in union membership ended, but the net effect is still subject to debate within the movement.

Unions such as the Service Employees International Union (SEIU) in North America and the Public Service Association (PSA) in New Zealand have combined innovative organizing and partnership combinations with notable success, leading to large and sustained membership gains (about 50% in each case) and increased influence and activism at workplace level.

An international new unionism network was launched in 2007 to bring unionists and labor supporters together around developing and applying these principles. The network provides fora and other resources for those interested in implementing the agenda.

== Causes of New Unionism ==
There are several why new unionism grew in Britain during the late nineteenth century. The first and most influential of these was the London Dock Strike of 1889. The unionization of these unskilled workers and the coverage they received from the Daily News encouraged other workers to join unions. Second, the achievement of the eight-hour workday by new unions inspired more workers to unionize. Third, an improvement in the education of the working class and the enfranchisement of working class men encouraged them to seek more change. Finally the growing number of unskilled workers at this time meant workers were actually willing to pay union dues, which meant unions had more members and therefore more power.

The effect of socialism on new unionism is a hotly debated topic among historians. While all believe it had some effect on the movement, they disagree on its overall impact. For example, most historians agree that the more militant tactics seen in new unionism were a result of the militant tactics involved in socialism, but they debate whether this was beneficial for the movement. They also disagree how much socialists were involved with these unions. On the one hand there certainly were socialists who started and joined unions, and many socialist policies aligned with the goal of these unions, such as the eight-hour workday. But, most of the people involved with these new unions were not socialist and even stood in firm opposition to socialism.

== Notable New Unions ==
=== Dockers' Union ===
- Led by Tom Mann, John Burns, and Ben Tillett the dockers union was formed on August 19, 1889. By August 20 the Port of London was closed and striking continued until September 16 when they got the famous " dockers tanner," a wage of six pence per hour. It is estimated that as many as 100,000 people were on strike at one point. Their success showed that the new unions of unskilled workers could win, and it became a major victory for new unionism.

=== Matchworkers Union ===
- On the morning of July 2, 1888, matchworkers began striking due to poor working conditions and pay. This all came to a head with the unfair firing of a worker. By that evening it is estimated around 1,400 women and girls were now on strike. By July 11 with the striking still going on the matchworkers were able to list grievances with the House of Commons. The strike eventually ended on July 21, and the matchworkers formed the largest union of women and girls in the country.
