= Tom Mann =

British trade unionist and activist (1856–1941)

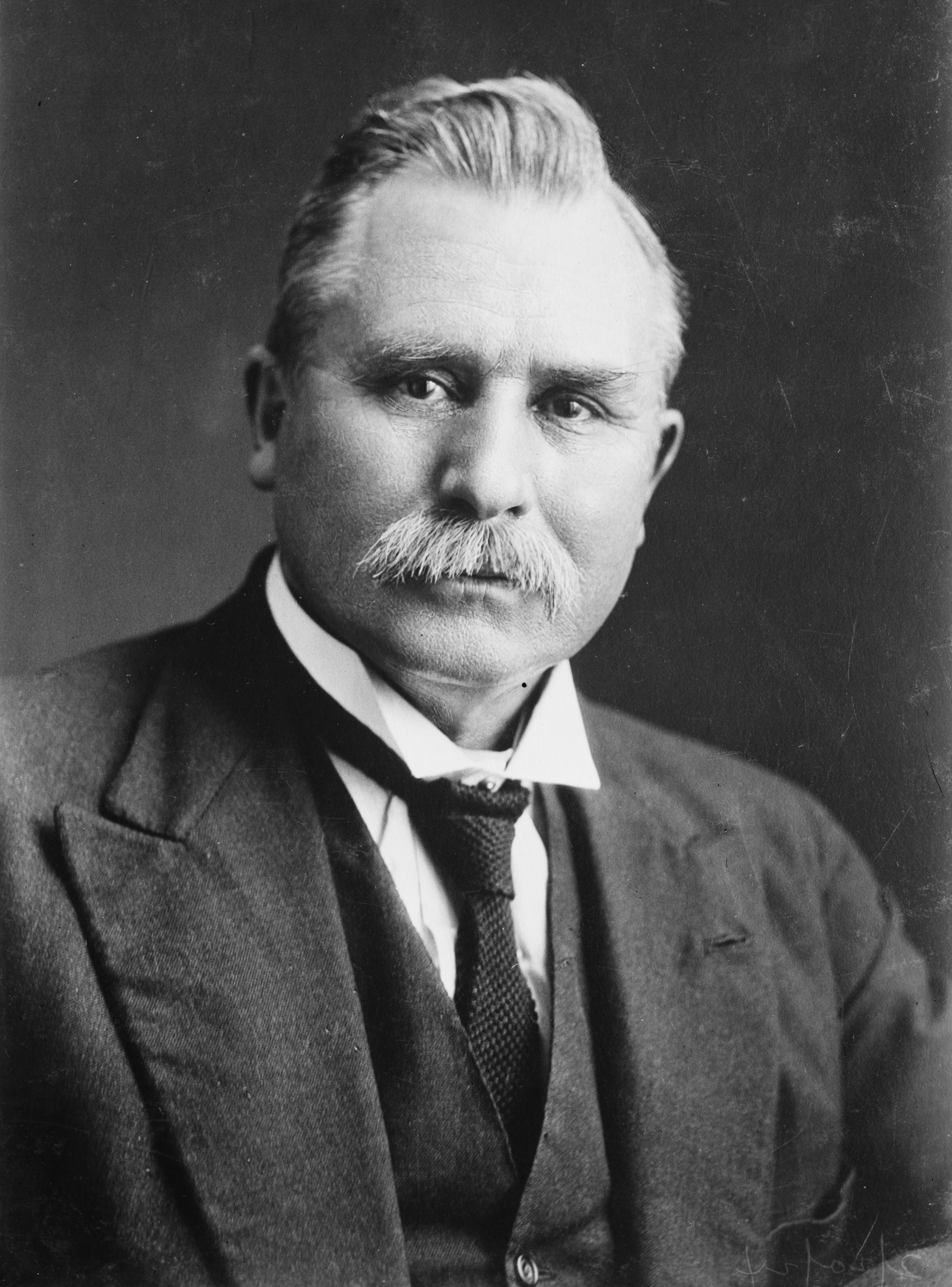
- Mann c. 1910s–1920s

General Secretary of the Amalgamated Engineering Union
- In office 1920–1921
- Preceded by: Himself
- Succeeded by: Albert Smethurst

General Secretary of the Amalgamated Society of Engineers
- In office 1919–1920
- Preceded by: Robert Young
- Succeeded by: Himself

President of the International Transport Workers' Federation
- In office 1893–1901
- Preceded by: Office established
- Succeeded by: Tom Chambers

President of the Dock, Wharf, Riverside and General Labourers' Union
- In office 1889–1901
- Preceded by: Harry Orbell
- Succeeded by: Thomas Merrells

Personal details
- Born: Thomas Mann; 15 April 1856 Longford, Coventry, England
- Died: 13 March 1941 (aged 84) Grassington, England
- Party: Communist Party of Great Britain (1920–1941); British Socialist Party (1917–1920); Industrial Syndicalist Education League (1910–1913); Victorian Socialist Party (1906–1909); Social Democratic Federation (1884–1906)

Thomas Mann (15 April 1856 – 13 March 1941) was an English trade unionist and activist. Largely self-educated, Mann became a successful organiser and a popular public speaker in the British labour movement.

== Early years ==
Mann was born on 15 April 1856, on Grange Road, Longford, Coventry. His birth house was previously maintained by Coventry City Council, but is now privately owned after being sold in 2004. The property still stands today. Mann was the son of a clerk who worked at a colliery. He attended school from the ages of six to nine, then began work doing odd jobs on the colliery farm. A year later he became a trapper, a labour-intensive job that involved clearing blockages from the narrow airways in the mining shafts.

In 1870, the colliery was forced to close and the family moved to Birmingham. Mann soon found work as an engineering apprentice. He attended public meetings addressed by Annie Besant and John Bright, and this began his political awareness. He completed his apprenticeship in 1877 and moved to London, however he was unable to find work as an engineer and took a series of unskilled jobs.

In 1879, Mann found work in an engineering shop. Here he was introduced to socialism by the foreman, and decided to improve his own education. His reading included the works of William Morris, Henry George, and John Ruskin. In 1881 he joined the Amalgamated Society of Engineers, and took part in his first strike. In 1884, he joined the Social Democratic Federation (SDF) in Battersea. Here he met John Burns and Henry Hyde Champion, who encouraged him to publish a pamphlet calling for the working day to be limited to eight hours. Mann formed an organisation, the Eight Hour League, which successfully pressured the Trades Union Congress to adopt the eight-hour day as a key goal.

== Activist and leader ==
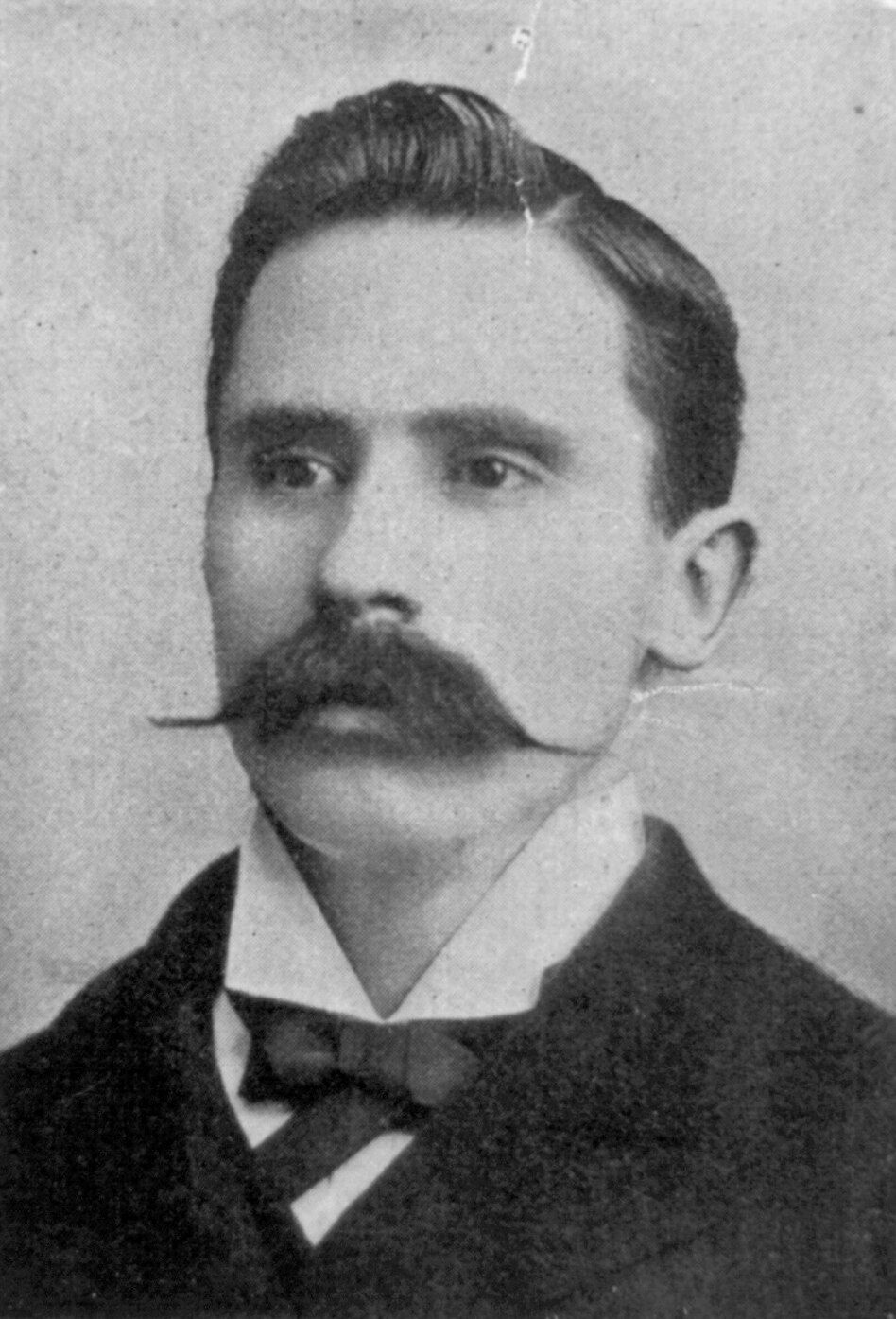
Mann in 1894

After reading The Communist Manifesto in 1886, Mann became a communist. He now believed the main purpose of the labour movement should be to overthrow capitalism, rather than just to ameliorate the condition of workers under it. He moved to Newcastle in 1887 and organised the SDF in the north of England. He managed Keir Hardie's electoral campaign in Lanark before returning to London in 1888, where he worked in support of the Bryant and May match factory strike. With Burns and Champion, he began producing a journal, the Labour Elector, in 1888.

Along with Burns, Ben Tillett and Harry Orbell, Mann was one of the leading figures in the London dock strike of 1889. He was responsible for organising relief for the strikers and their families. With the support of other unions and various organisations, the strike was successful. Following the strike, Mann was elected President of the newly formed Dock, Wharf, Riverside and General Labourers' Union, with Tillett as General Secretary. Tillett and Mann wrote a pamphlet called New Unionism, which advanced the utopian ideal of a co-operative commonwealth. Mann was also elected to the London Trades and Labour Council and as secretary of the National Reform Union, and was a member of the Royal Commission on Labour from 1891 to 1893. In 1894, he was a founding member of the Independent Labour Party and became the party Secretary in 1894. He was an unsuccessful candidate for the party in the 1895 general election. In 1896 he was beaten in the election for Secretary of the Amalgamated Society of Engineers. He helped create the International Transport Workers' Federation, and was its first President. He was deported from a number of European countries for organising trade unions.

Mann's religious belief was as strong as his politics. He was an Anglican and organised support from Christian organisations like the Salvation Army during a number of strikes. In 1893 there were rumours that he intended to become a church minister. He advocated the co-operative model of economic organisation, but resisted alliance between the ILP and other socialist organisations in Britain, like the Fabians. In 1895, the Fabian Beatrice Webb criticised Mann's absolutism and described his goal derogatorily as, "a body of men all professing exactly the same creed and all working in exact uniformity to exactly the same end". Philip Snowden, a member of the ILP, liked Mann but was critical of his inability to stay with any one party or organisation for more than a few years.

== Australia and Liverpool ==
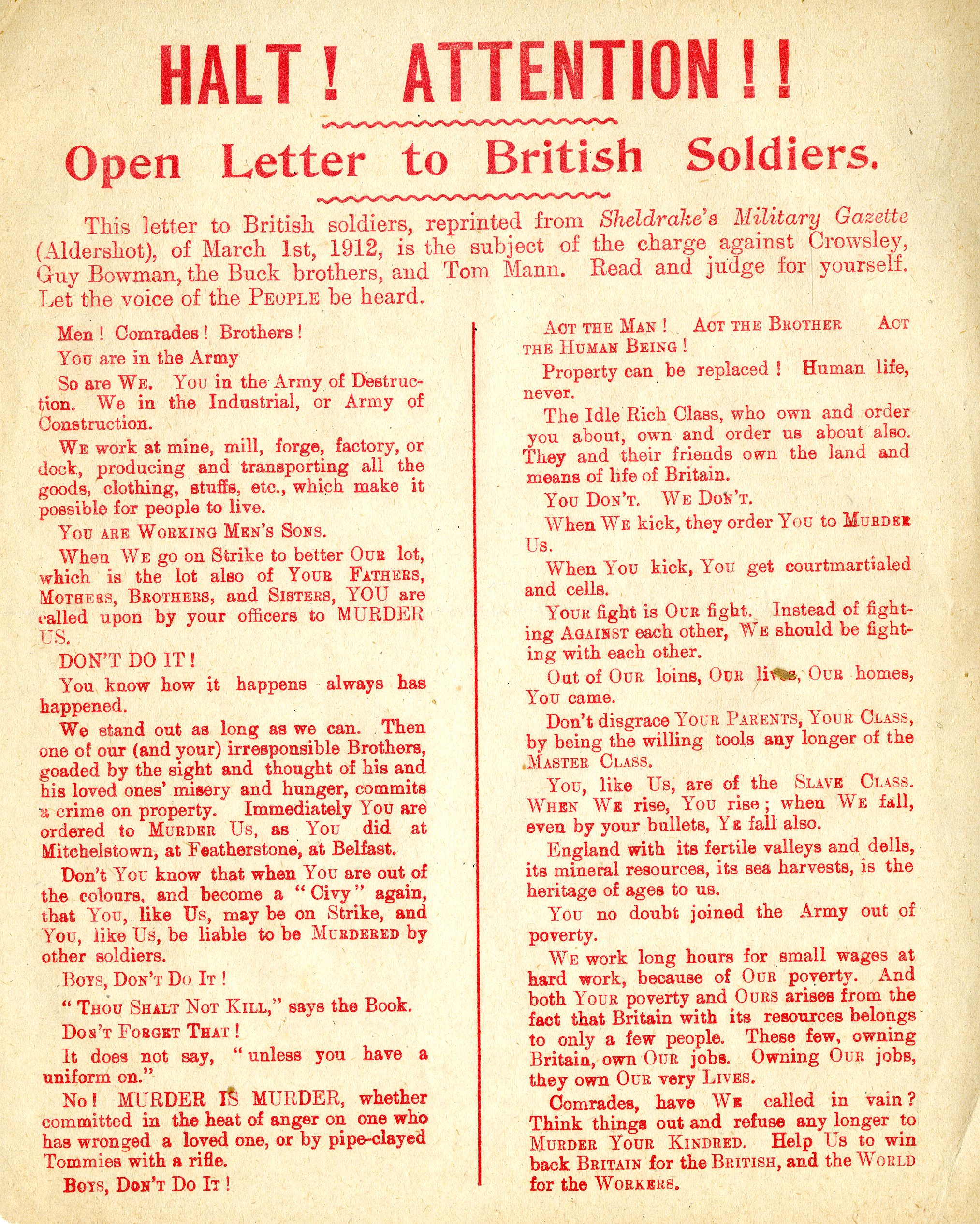
Leaflet reproducing Mann's 'Open Letter to British Soldiers' (transcription)

In 1902, Mann emigrated to Australia, to see if that country's broader electoral franchise would allow more "drastic modification of capitalism". Settling in Melbourne, he was active in Australian trade unions and became an organiser for the Australian Labor Party. However, he grew disillusioned with the party, believing it was being corrupted by the nature of government and concerned only with winning elections. He felt that the federal Labor MPs were unable and unwilling to change society, and their prominence within the movement was stifling and over-shadowing organised labour. He resigned from the ALP and founded the Victorian Socialist Party.

Returning to Britain in 1910, Mann wrote The Way to Win, a pamphlet that argued that socialism could be achieved only through trade unionism and co-operation, and that parliamentary democracy was inherently corrupt. He founded the Industrial Syndicalist Education League, and worked as an organiser for Ben Tillett. He led the 1911 Liverpool General Transport Strike. In 1912 he was convicted under the Incitement to Mutiny Act 1797 of publishing an article in The Syndicalist, as an "Open Letter to British Soldiers", urging them to refuse to shoot at strikers (later reprinted as a leaflet, Don't Shoot); his prison sentence was quashed after public pressure. He was opposed to Britain's involvement in World War I on socialist and religious grounds and addressed pacifist rallies.

On 10 June 1913 he spoke at Wednesbury Market Place in support of strikers in the Great Black Country Trades Dispute, which lasted for two months and threatened government preparations for World War I. Mann returned to the area again on 3 July.

In 1917, he joined the successor to the Social Democratic Federation, the British Socialist Party, which had affiliated to the Labour Party the previous year.

== Veteran campaigner ==
In 1919, he again ran for election as Secretary of the Amalgamated Society of Engineers, this time successfully. He held the post until 1921, when he retired at the age of sixty-five. He welcomed the Russian October Revolution in 1917 and the Communist government, and called for soviets to be formed in the United Kingdom. In 1920, he was one of many members of the British Socialist Party, inspired by the Revolution, who formed the Communist Party of Great Britain. Mann was chairman of the British Bureau of the Red International of Labor Unions and its successor, the National Minority Movement, from their formation in 1921 until 1929.

Tom Mann continued to actively champion socialism, communism, and co-operation, until his death in 1941. He published further pamphlets and regularly addressed public meetings, in Britain and abroad. He was arrested for sedition, on several occasions. He continued to be a popular figure in the labour movement, attracting large audiences to rallies and benefits. Mann advocated animal rights and was supportive of the Humanitarian League.

== Spanish Civil War ==
On the outbreak of the Spanish Civil War in July 1936, Mann became a member of the Spanish Medical Aid Committee, an organization that had been set-up by the Socialist Medical Association and other progressive groups. During the Spanish Civil War, he wanted to fight on the Republican side, but was by that time far too old. A unit of the International Brigade, the Tom Mann Centuria, was named in his honour.

== Death and legacy ==
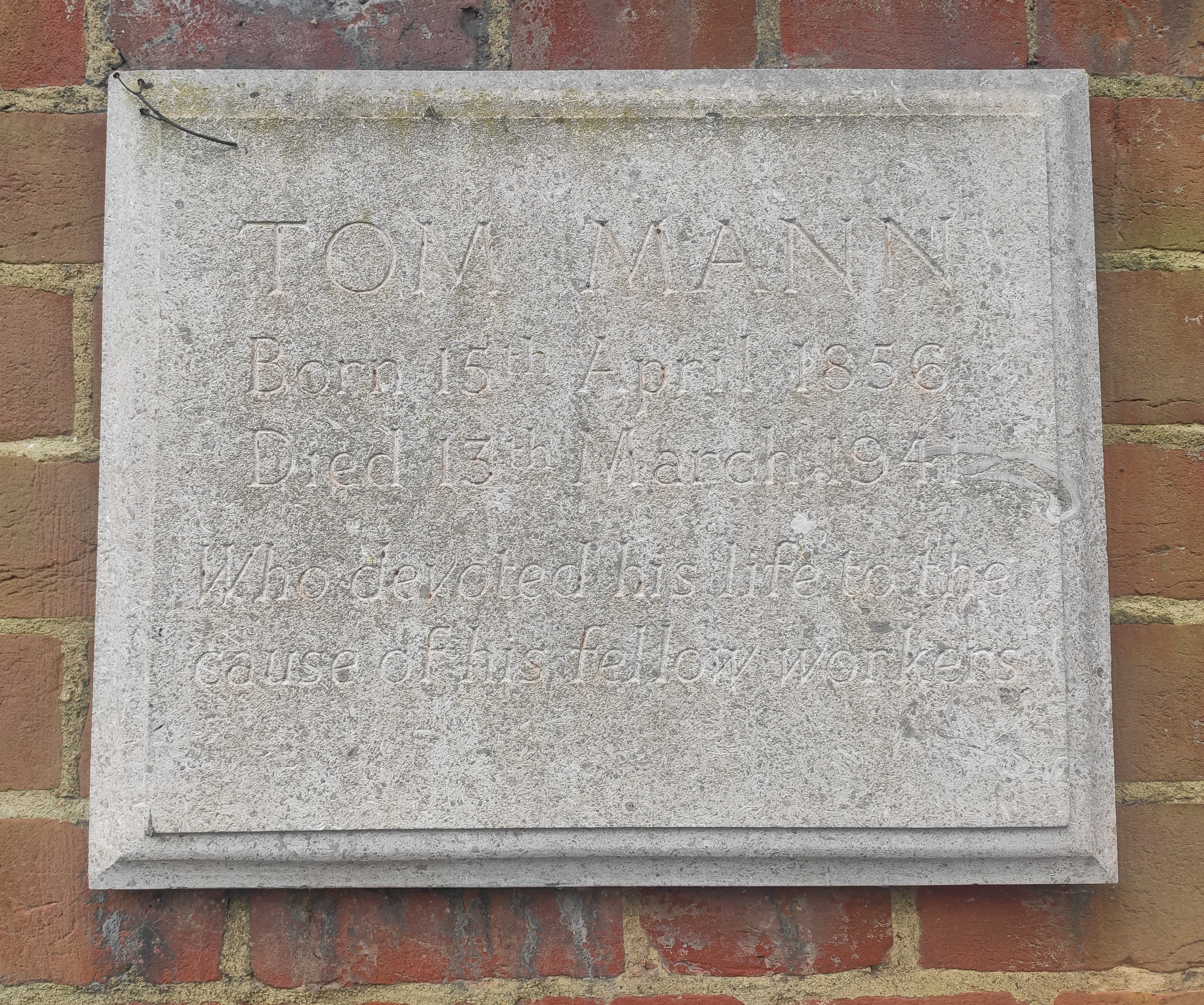
Plaque dedicated to Mann at Golders Green Crematorium

Tom Mann died at age 84, on 13 March 1941 in Grassington, Northern Yorkshire. He was cremated at Golders Green Crematorium. A memorial stands in front of the cottage where he died. There is also a memorial on his birthplace in Coventry. As mentioned, in 1936 a unit of the International Brigade was named the Tom Mann Centuria in his honour. The Tom Mann Theatre in Sydney, Australia, was named after him.

One of Mann's great-grandsons was Nicholas Bennett, Conservative MP for Pembroke from 1987 to 1992 and a Welsh Office minister from 1990 to 1992.

== See also ==
- Eight-Hour Leagues

Party political offices
New office	Secretary of the London Reform Union; 1892–1898	Succeeded by F. W. Galton
Preceded by Shaw Maxwell	General Secretary of the Independent Labour Party; 1894–1895	Succeeded by John Robertson
Trade union offices
Preceded by Harry Orbell	President of the Dock, Wharf, Riverside and General Labourers' Union; 1889–1901	Succeeded by Thomas Merrells
New office	President of the International Transport Workers' Federation; 1893–1901	Succeeded by Tom Chambers
Preceded by Robert Young	General Secretary of the Amalgamated Engineering Union; 1919–1921	Succeeded by A. H. Smethurst
