= Tom Chambers (trade unionist) =

British trade unionist

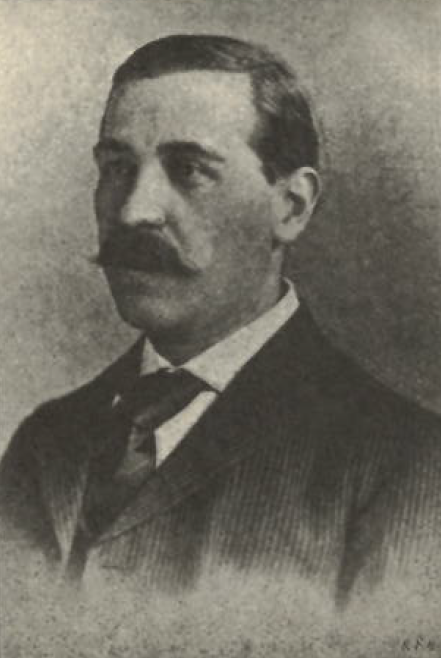
Chambers, in about 1900

John Thomas G. Chambers (July 1867 – 3 January 1926) was a British trade unionist.

Born in St Neots, Chambers left school at the age of twelve and began working in a grocery shop. He later completed an apprenticeship as a stonemason and developed an interest in socialism, being an early member of the Independent Labour Party. He moved to London in 1893.

In 1896, Chambers was elected as the Secretary of the International Transport Workers' Federation, serving until 1904. He was active in the Independent Labour Party and was elected as the first General Secretary of the Workers' Union in 1898. In 1909, he toured the ports of the United States with Havelock Wilson in order to increase trade union membership. He was then centrally involved in the seamen's strike of 1911.

Chambers also served as Treasurer of the National Sailors' and Firemen's Union, and of the National Alliance of Employers and Employed, and was active in the Navy League and the Seafarers Education Service.

Trade union offices
| Preceded by Robert Peddie | General Secretary of the International Transport Workers' Federation; 1896–1904 | Succeeded by Ben Tillett |
| Preceded by Tom Mann | President of the International Transport Workers' Federation; 1901–1904 | Succeeded by Ben Tillett |
| Preceded by New position | General Secretary of the Workers' Union; 1898–1900 | Succeeded by Charles Duncan |
