= Robert Peddie =

Scottish trade unionist and political activist

Robert Alexander Peddie (1869 – 1951) was a Scottish trade unionist and political activist.

Peddie joined the Fabian Society in 1892, and was an early member of the Independent Labour Party, serving for a time as a member of the executive of its London Federation. In 1896, he served briefly as secretary of the International Transport Workers' Federation, and also as secretary to the agenda committee for the International Socialist Congress.

Peddle worked in London as a librarian for the St. Bride Foundation Typographical Library and in 1914 delivered the Cantor Lectures at the RSA House of the Royal Society of Arts.

Trade union offices
Preceded by Ben Tillett	General Secretary of the International Transport Workers' Federation; 1896	Succeeded by Tom Chambers
