= Dock, Wharf, Riverside and General Labourers' Union =

Former trade union of the United Kingdom

Dockers' Union
- Dock, Wharf, Riverside and General Labourers' Union
- Merged into: Transport and General Workers' Union
- Founded: 1887
- Dissolved: 1 January 1922
- Headquarters: Effingham House, Arundel Street, London
- Location: United Kingdom
- Members: 120,000 (1920)
- Affiliations: NTWF, TUC

The Dock, Wharf, Riverside and General Labourers Union (DWRGLU), often known as the Dockers' Union, was a British trade union representing dock workers in the United Kingdom, founded in 1887 and merged into the Transport and General Workers' Union in 1922.

== History ==
The union was founded in 1887 as the Tea Operatives and General Labourers' Association, to organise opposition to a cut in wages for workers involved in unloading and processing tea at the East and West India Dock Company's Cutler Street warehouse. From the start, it included other supportive workers, with secretary Ben Tillett working at nearby Monument Quay Warehouse. Considered part of the New Unionism movement, it grew rapidly, with 2,300 members by the end of 1888.

The union was central to the London dock strike of 1889, many of the participants in the strike joining the union immediately after the strike. By the end of the year, it had 30,932 members, and had been renamed as the "Dock, Wharf, Riverside and General Labourers' Union", reflecting the broader base of its membership. However, most dock labourers working in the docks on the south bank of the River Thames instead joined a new rival, the South Side Labour Protection League, in protest at the degree of centralisation in the Dockers' Union, and its refusal to allow branch meetings to take place in pubs.

The Dockers' Union rapidly became the principal union for dockworkers in London, Bristol, Cardiff, and other ports in the south and south-west, and also branches abroad in the Dutch cities of Amsterdam and Rotterdam following the 1889 Rotterdam dock strike, although these were short-lived. In South Wales it attracted a large following amongst metal-workers. The union was renamed the Dock, Wharf, Riverside and General Workers' Union of Great Britain and Ireland in 1899. By this time, it had lost most of its members in London, but continued to grow as more workers joined elsewhere in the country.

The union was a constituent of the National Transport Workers' Federation and was keen to amalgamate with other similar unions. Ernest Bevin became a prominent official in the union from 1910, and he initiated the merger process which formed the Transport and General Workers' Union in 1922.

The union published the Dockers' Record as a monthly report of its activities.

== Election results ==
The union sponsored Labour Party candidates in two general elections, some of whom won election:

| Election | Constituency | Candidate | Votes | Percentage | Position |
|---|---|---|---|---|---|
| 1906 | Eccles | Ben Tillett | 3,985 | 26.4 | 3 |
| 1918 | Bristol South | Thomas Lewis | 6,409 | 31.8 | 2 |
| 1918 | Forest of Dean | James Wignall | 9,731 | 62.8 | 1 |
| 1918 | Salford North | Ben Tillett | 12,079 | 74.4 | 1 |

== Leadership ==
=== Secretaries ===
1887: Ben Tillett

=== Presidents ===
1887: Harry Orbell
1889: Tom Mann
1901: Thomas Merrells
1902: J. Howell
1905: James Wignall
1908: J. Howell
1911:
1913: Dan W. Milford
