= Harry Orbell =

British trade unionist

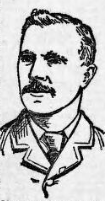
- Orbell in 1891
- Born: November 4, 1860; Bethnal Green
- Died: March 27, 1914 (aged 53); London
- Occupations: Trade unionist, president Tea Operatives' and General Labourers' Association, organiser Dock, Wharf, Riverside and General Labourers' Union

Harry Orbell (4 November 1860 – 27 March 1914) was a British trade unionist.

Born in Bethnal Green on 4 November 1860, Henry Joseph (Harry) Orbell trained as a writing desk maker, but was unable to find sufficient work, and so instead found employment at a tea warehouse, repairing tea chests. In 1887, there was a proposal to reduce wages of workers at the warehouse, and Orbell helped organise a meeting in opposition to this. The meeting founded the Tea Operatives' and General Labourers' Association, with Orbell becoming its president.

The union played a key role in the London Dock strike of 1889, with Orbell leading strike action at the nearby Tilbury Docks. He kept the strike solid there, in part by sending trade unionists to infiltrate groups of workers unwittingly recruited to break the strike, then getting the unionists to leaflet the new workers, informing them of their situation, and requesting that they return to London.

Following the strike, the union grew dramatically in size and became the Dock, Wharf, Riverside and General Labourers' Union, with Orbell as one of two full-time national organisers (alongside Tom McCarthy). Both were credited with maintaining the strength of the union after the strike. Orbell travelled to Rotterdam in the Netherlands to support the 1889 Rotterdam dock strike and actively sought to prevent English dockworkers from being deployed as strike-breakers. Following the strike, the 'Rotterdam Branch' of the Dock, Wharf, Riverside and General Labourers’ Union was established with his help (and apparently also a branch in Amsterdam).

Later, he was based in London, but regularly travelled the country, and was one of the first to spot the talents of Ernest Bevin – the future General Secretary of the powerful Transport and General Workers' Union – successfully recommending him to Ben Tillett for a full-time post.

Orbell was one of the main organisers of the successful 1911 Liverpool general transport strike for the right to unionize, along with better pay and conditions. The following year, he advised against transport workers in London holding a strike; the workers voted for strike action and Orbell then supported them, but the ten-week strike was ultimately unsuccessful. Already in poor health, the strain of this worsened his condition and although he recovered for a while, he became ill again in late 1913 and died in March 1914.

Orbell was a member of the Social Democratic Party (SDP) – better nown to history by its pre-1908 moniker, the Social Democratic Federation (SDF) – a party of Marxian social democrats. In his role as national organizer, Orbell was well placed to make sure that the activists of his small party expanded their influence within the Dockers' Union. George Lansbury remembered him as a "happy, full faced, fresh-coloured man, always cheery, and in the most depressing circumstances quite undismayed and confident that the workers' cause would triumph." He was a "professional agitator", and like Lansbury himself, he was a Christian.

Although Orbell never stood for political office, he supported the Labour Party, and served for some years on its National Executive Committee (1909–1913). He also served as a union representative on the Port of London Authority. He served as organiser of the Dockers' Union until he died in 1914. His funeral drew leading figures from across the labour movement, making it a remarkable event.

Trade union offices
Preceded by New position	President of the Tea Operatives' and General Labourers' Association; 1887–1889	Succeeded by Tom Mann
Preceded by New position	National Organiser of the Dock, Wharf, Riverside and General Labourers' Union; 1889–1914; With: Tom McCarthy (1889–1899)	Succeeded by Ernest Bevin
