= 1889 London dock strike =

Industrial dispute in the Port of London

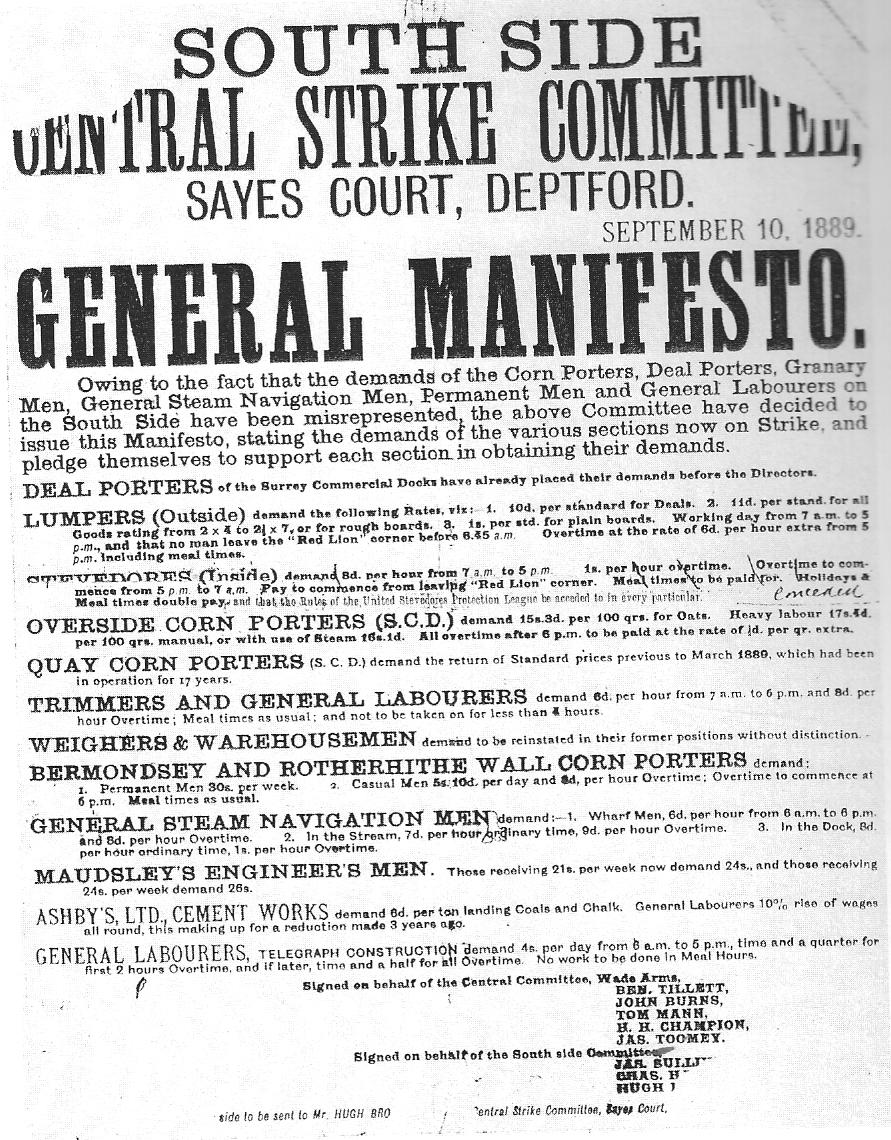
- Manifesto of the South Side Central Strike Committee, issued during the strike
- Date: 12 August–14 September 1889
- Location: Port of London
- Caused by: Disagreement over how piece-work was paid
- Goals: Higher wages and improved working conditions
- Methods: General strike
- Result: Strikers won their pay claim of sixpence per hour, the "dockers' tanner"

Parties
Dock, Wharf, Riverside and General Labourers' Union; National Amalgamated Sailors' and Firemen's Union	Private dock companies	Mediators commissioned by the Lord Mayor of the City of London

Lead figures
Ben Tillett; John Burns; Tom Mann; Ben Cooper; Will Thorne; Harry Orbell; Joseph Havelock Wilson		Cardinal Manning, Archbishop of Westminster

Number
75.000-100.000; some sources claim 130.000		

A strike action involving dock workers in the Port of London broke out on 14 August 1889, and resulted in victory for the 100,000 strikers when they won their pay claim of sixpence per hour, the so-called "dockers' tanner". The industrial action also established strong trade unions amongst London dockers, one of which became the nationally important Dock, Wharf, Riverside and General Labourers' Union. The strike is widely considered a milestone in the development of the British labour movement, symbolising the growth of the New Unions of casual, unskilled and poorly paid workers, in contrast to the craft unions already in existence. The strike helped to draw attention to the problem of poverty in Victorian Britain and the dockers' cause attracted considerable public sympathy.

== Background ==
The London dock strike of 1889 came during a surge in labour activism among London's working class, as poorly paid workers in many industries organized against low wages and harsh conditions. It was preceded by several other developments which marked the emergence of a new mood amongst unskilled workers. The dockers took their confidence from 1888 the successful London matchgirls strike of 1888 at the Bryant and May factory in Bow, and the successful organisation of London gasworkers in the National Union of Gas Workers and General Labourers by Will Thorne and Ben Tillett, who would become major leaders in the dock strike.

The 1888 strike by the matchwomen was the spark. Treated with hostility and demanding better pay for their work, the women showed that low-paid, overlooked workers could organize and be heard. Dock labour was the male equivalent. It supported families but at a high cost in poor conditions and low pay, averaging "five pence an hour on the 'plus' system," with a small bonus for finishing jobs early. Supervisors often refused to pay the bonus, and the men stopped doing the unpaid extra work.

After the matchwomen's victory, "the dockers and other workers contacted the Union of Women Matchmakers to ask for advice on establishing their own organizations." What began as a request for a one-penny hourly raise grew into a strike of around 130,000 workers, earning it the name the Great Dock Strike. Workers from many trades, including "stevedores, ship-painters, dockyard mechanics, carpenters, shipwrights, carmen, lightermen," united for one goal. The dockers' strike was more dramatic than the preceding disputes, because of the sheer number of workers involved, the poor reputation that dockers previously enjoyed, and various other aspects of the dispute.

== Dispute ==
Sing a song of sixpence,
Dockers on the strike.
Guinea pigs are hungry,
As the greedy pike.
Till the docks are opened,
Burns for you will speak.
Courage lads, and you'll win,
Well within the week.

— London dockworkers in 1889

The 1889 London dock strike started on 12 August, sparked by a disagreement over how piece-work was paid at one of the port’s dock systems. For several reasons, the walkout spread from there, and by 22 August the whole port had stopped work. The unions demanded that dock companies guarantee at least four hours’ work to anyone hired, with fair, “without favouritism” selection at set call-on times of 8am and 12 noon. They also asked for pay of 6d (a “tanner”, roughly £2 today) per hour for day work and 8d for overtime, which gave the strike its name: the "dockers' tanner". Employers tried to break the strike but failed to weaken it. By 5 September, some were willing to offer concessions, and a small number of men went back to work on those terms. Most port workers stayed out, however, until a full settlement was reached on 14 September. By then the port had been almost completely paralyzed for nearly four weeks, and no earlier stoppage in Britain’s shipping and dock industries had been on such a scale.

Colonel G. R. Birt, the general manager at the Millwall Docks, gave evidence to a Parliamentary committee, on the physical condition of the workers:

The poor fellows are miserably clad, scarcely with a boot on their foot, in a most miserable state ... These are men who come to work in our docks who come on without having a bit of food in their stomachs, perhaps since the previous day; they have worked for an hour and have earned 5d.; their hunger will not allow them to continue: they take the 5d. in order that they may get food, perhaps the first food they have had for twenty-four hours.

London’s casual dockers had long protested the humiliating early-morning "call-on," where desperate crowds massed at the dock gates hoping the foreman would pick them for a few hours' work. The dock strike began over a dispute about 'plus' money during the unloading of the Lady Armstrong in the West India Docks. 'Plus' money was a bonus paid for completing work quickly. The East and West India Docks Company's (E&WIDC), general manager Lieutenant Colonel John Lowther du Plat Taylor (of 49th Middlesex Rifle Volunteers) had cut their 'plus' rates to attract ships into their own docks rather than others.

Strikers at the East India Dock Road during the 1889 London dock strike. The model ship was carried on those protest marches.

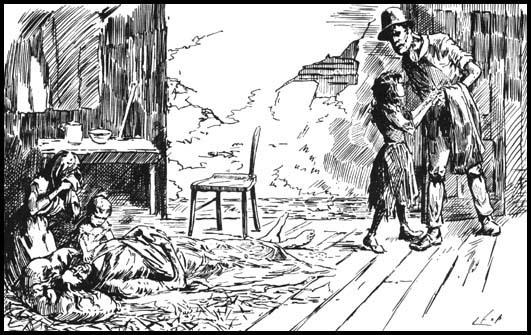
"The Secret of Englands Greatness: 5d per hour" by Livingstone Hopkins in The Australian Bulletin, August 1889

Dock workers gathering outside the West India Docks gates during the London Dock Strike, September 7, 1889.

Prior to the strike, few dockers were organised, but once it began, the Dock, Wharf, Riverside and General Labourers' Union recruited a substantial section of the London docks workforce. Aware that public sympathy and press coverage were crucial, the dock unions staged daily marches with brass bands and banners to the City of London's financial heart. Their leaders addressed mass meetings on Tower Hill before thousands of onlookers. Local residents, many dependent on the docks, rallied behind the strikers, among them the Irish landlady of Poplar's Wade's Arms, who offered the leaders a meeting room and nourishing stews.

The large, peaceful processions impressed middle class opinion and won sympathy for the strikers' cause. In 1889, newspapers were a main source of news and could shape which issues the public paid attention to. Their coverage of the London Dock Strike spread well beyond Britain. From late August, Australian papers reported on it extensively through cable services, and an editorial in The Age on August 29 prompted readers to start a relief fund. Most Australian metropolitan dailies sympathized with the dockworkers and kept supporting them throughout the strike.

The coverage drew significant financial help for the dockers and their families. British conservatives even blamed the surprising flow of colonial donations on the cables' "highly coloured pictures." Of the £16,075 raised by the British public and unions, £7,420 came through radical newspapers. Supporters saw the strike as a desperate response to miserable pay and conditions. Together, the press coverage, public sympathy, and donations created broad international support for workers' rights. The strike relief fund was supported by £30,000 donated from Australia.

A paralysed port of London was costing the Empire dearly, so the Lord Mayor of the City of London opened talks between dockers and employers, joined by Cardinal Manning, Archbishop of Westminster, a nod to the Irish Catholic heritage of many Docklands residents. The settlement granted most of the dockers’ demands, including the “tanner”. After a victory rally in Hyde Park on 15 September, with the Australian flag at the forefront, the dockers returned to work the next morning, satisfied with their improved pay and conditions. Manning was seen as fair and impartial by both sides. Upon the resolution of the strike, the dock workers collected £160 for Manning in appreciation of his work, and Manning donated the money to a local hospital to provide a bed.

Notable organisers who came to prominence during the strike include Ben Tillett, John Burns, Tom Mann, Ben Cooper, Will Thorne and the seamen's leader Joseph Havelock Wilson. The most notable politician to come to the fore during the strike was the Progressive Party London County Councillor John Benn. As an increasingly prominent local politician, he was invited to stand for Parliament as the Liberal Party candidate for St George Division of Tower Hamlets. He was subsequently elected in the 1892 general election, becoming the first of four generations of the Benn family to serve as MPs.

== Long-term results ==
The strike was a landmark victory for "New Unionism," which focused on organizing the unskilled and semi-skilled workers. This phenomenon, according to historians like Eric Hobsbawm, marked a qualitative transformation of the British labor movement and drew attention to the sheer scale of poverty in Victorian Britain. Even the established labour aristocracy was caught off guard by the subsequent emergence of general unions representing unskilled workers.

The strike profoundly transformed how the middle class viewed workers. The large, peaceful, and organized processions through the streets of London, led by charismatic leaders like Tom Mann and John Burns, impressed them. Londoners watching from balconies of upscale hotels waved handkerchiefs as a token of support. The strikers' self-restraint, discipline, and "pluck" challenged the perception of the poor as inherently disorderly or prone to violence. Previously dismissed as impossible to organize and inherently threatening, working-class participants displayed remarkable organization and discipline. This shift revealed the possibility of resolving social tensions through peaceful means.

The successful strike had a galvanising effect on dockworkers in the Dutch port of Rotterdam and triggered the 1889 Rotterdam dock strike. This was supported by the English unions, which actively sought to prevent English dockworkers from being deployed as strike-breakers. Union organiser Harry Orbell travelled to Rotterdam, where, following the strike, the 'Rotterdam Branch' of the Dock, Wharf, Riverside and General Labourers’ Union was established.

=== Church roles ===
The involvement of influential, religious figures, notably the respected Cardinal Manning (who acted as a mediator) and William Booth of the Salvation Army (who raised funds for relief), lent significant moral legitimacy to the workers' cause. From the Catholic Church's point of view, Cardinal Manning's involvement in the strike, as a mediator trusted by both sides, could be seen as foreshadowing the encyclical Rerum novarum ('Of New Things') issued by Pope Leo XIII two years later, on 15 May 1891. Addressing "the condition of the working classes", the Church's policy set out in that encyclical explicitly supported the right of labour to form unions, but rejected socialism and affirmed private property rights. The Pope said, "Each needs the other: capital cannot do without labour, nor labour without capital. Mutual agreement results in the beauty of good order, while perpetual conflict necessarily produces confusion and savage barbarity".)

== See also ==
- Stepney Historical Trust

== Sources ==
- Bouman, P.J.; Bouman, W.H. (1952). De groei van de grote werkstad: een studie over de bevolking van Rotterdam (in Dutch). Assen: Van Gorcum.
- Broeze, Frank (August 1991). "Militancy and Pragmatism: An International Perspective on Maritime Labour, 1870–1914" (PDF). International Review of Social History. 36 (2): 165–200. doi:10.1017/S0020859000110491.
- Duffy, A.E.P. (1961). "New Unionism in Britain, 1889-1890: A Reappraisal". The Economic History Review. 14 (2): 306–319 – via JSTOR.
- Lovelll, John Christopher (1969). Stevedores and Dockers: A Study of Trade Unionism in the Port of London, 1870-1914. London: MacMillan.
- Lovell, John Christopher (1985). "The Significance of the Great Dock Strike of 1889 in British Labour History". In Mommsen, Wolfgang J.; Husung, Hans-Gerhard (eds.). The Development of Trade Unionism in Great Britain and Germany, 1880-1914. London: George Allen & Unwin. pp. 100–113. ISBN 0-04-940080-0.
- Raw, Louise (2009). Striking a Light: The Bryant and May Matchwomen and their Place in History. London/New York: Continuum. ISBN 978-1-44112-1-042.
- Smit, Evert (2013). De syndicale onderstroom: Stakingen in de Rotterdamse haven, 1889-2010 (PDF) (in Dutch). Amsterdam: Vossius UvA. p. 64. ISBN 978-90-5629-737-4.
- Ben Tillett Memories and Reflections (London, 1931)
- Walker, R.B. (November 1981). "Media and Money: The London Dock Strike of 1889 and the Australian Maritime Strike of 1890". Labour History (41): 41–56 – via JSTOR.
