= 1889 Rotterdam dock strike =

Industrial dispute in the Port of Rotterdam

- Dockworkers on a cargo ship unloading sacks of grain.
- Date: 26 September – 2 October 1889
- Location: Port of Rotterdam
- Caused by: Discontent over working conditions; triggered by the successful 1889 London dock strike
- Goals: Higher wages and improved working conditions
- Methods: General strike
- Result: The hourly wage was raised to 25 cents and an extra payment of 50% was won for Sunday work

Parties
Strike committee, supported by the Social Democratic League (Dutch: Sociaal-Democratische Bond, SDB)	Private dock companies, supported by local and national authorities

Lead figures
A. van der Kolk; Pieter Sas	

Number
8,000	

The first major strike in the Dutch port of Rotterdam took place in 1889. It was triggered by the successful 1889 London dock strike over wage increases and labour conditions. A general strike broke out among the dockworkers on 26 September 1889 and, after negotiations, ended with reasonable success on 2 October, when the employers conceded most of the dockworkers' demands.

== Background ==
The improvement of the Nieuwe Waterweg in 1885 made the port of Rotterdam accessible to steamships with a considerable draught. The city developed from a trading port into a transit port, particularly for the rapidly developing coal and steel industry in the German Ruhr region, which was difficult to reach for the ports of Hamburg and Antwerp. Both the number of arriving ships and the level of activity in the port increased sharply. However, steamships had a much smaller crew than traditional sailing ships, as a result of which loading and unloading was partly taken over by specialised firms based in the port.

These stevedores (Note: A stevedore in the Rotterdam context refers to a stevedore foreman who was a subcontractor who, on behalf of the shipping company or the shipping agent, organised and carried out the loading and unloading of ships. See: Smit, Evert (2013). De syndicale onderstroom: Stakingen in de Rotterdamse haven, 1889-2010 (PDF) (in Dutch). Amsterdam: Vossiuspers UvA. p. 54. ISBN 978-90-5629-737-4.) often recruited their labourers in pubs and similar gathering places. Because the fast-growing port drew many workers in from rural areas, the number of people seeking work was much greater than the number of available jobs. Unemployment was chronic, since work was not available every day. Trade unions had little influence among the dock workers, who were also reluctant to join them. Instead, the workers tended to depend on informal networks, spontaneous action, and mutual solidarity.

In the summer of 1889, discontent was brewing among the dock workers. Their lot was wretched: work was distributed haphazardly, wages were paid out in pubs, the amount of work done under piece rates was fiddled, and there were other abuses. The successful strike by the London dockers in August/September, who, with the support of public opinion, managed to win significant gains, acted as a catalyst. On 18 September the Social Democratic League (Dutch: Sociaal-Democratische Bond, SDB) called a meeting in the socialist meeting hall on the Binnenrotte. There, Willem Helsdingen took the initiative in formulating a number of demands that it was thought could be put to the employers. It was also decided to issue a call to all dock workers, some 1,500 in number, to attend a further meeting.

The following day, work was already downed on a number of steamships. At the well-attended meeting that followed, a committee was formed, which drew up a list of demands and set an ultimatum. The demands included, among other things, an increase in the hourly wage from 20 to 25 cents, double pay for Sunday work, the abolition of child labour and an end to hiring and paying out in pubs. The employers had to reply before the 25th of that month.

== The strike ==
The employers knew they were facing only a weak organisation and did not accede to the dockworkers’ demands, but they underestimated the social tension in the ports. The strike movement spread faster than they had expected. Although spontaneous actions had already occurred here and there earlier, a general strike broke out on 26 September that involved some 8,000 dockworkers and spread fairly quickly across the port. Work came to a standstill on fifty steamships and 43 sailing ships.

Because work was still going on here and there, several hundred dockworkers gathered at the Leuvehaven. They went along the quays to persuade those willing to work, and here and there the strikers adopted a threatening attitude towards them. This first strike provoked an enormous and violent response from the authorities. The police protected those willing to work, gunboats and armed launches patrolled the river, hussars arrived from The Hague, and the mayor called out the civic guard, made up of armed grocers and other shopkeepers. A ban on gatherings was issued and skirmishes regularly took place on the Boompjes, at the Leuvehaven and on the Willemsplein, in which many were injured. The strikers were accused of being led by the nose by the socialists.

Attempts by the moderate General Dutch Workers' Union (Dutch: Algemeen Nederlandsch Werklieden-Verbond; ANWV) to break the strike and, in line with the employers’ wishes, to bring about negotiations, backfired. The shipping agents had initially underestimated the situation, mainly because the dockworkers lacked a regular organisation. However, the committee they hurriedly formed accepted the main demands fairly quickly in the negotiations with the strike committee on 2 October. The hourly wage was raised to 25 cents and an extra payment of 50% was won for Sunday work. (Note: The hourly wage would not rise in the years that followed; in 1911 it was still 25 cents an hour. See: van Driel, Hugo; Schot, J.W. (2002). "Het ontstaan van een gemechaniseerde massagoedhaven in Rotterdam". Techniek in Nederland in de twintigste eeuw. Deel 5. Transport, communicatie (PDF) (in Dutch). Zutphen: Walburg Pers. p. 95.) These agreements were not, however, put in writing contractually, so they could just as easily be reversed.

== Aftermath ==
After the strike, an attempt was made to establish a lasting trade union. Following a speech by the English trade unionist Harry Orbell – who had travelled to Rotterdam to support the strike and prevent English dockworkers from being deployed as strike-breakers – the 'Rotterdam Branch' of the Dock, Wharf, Riverside and General Labourers’ Union was founded on 6 October 1889. Most of those present joined, paying a subscription of 10 cents a week. The intention was to support one another (internationally) in case a strike proved unavoidable. A. van der Kolk and Piet Sas, who had also led the strike, were appointed chairman and secretary. As would prove the case with virtually all trade organisations in the port until 1908, this association did not enjoy a long life. Within a year, only the name remained.

At the instigation of the anti-socialist ANWV a group of dockworkers who rejected foreign and socialist influence founded the association “De Nederlandsche Vlag” ("The Dutch Flag") as a counterpart to the ‘English’ union, led by Bertus de Beer, one of the members of the original strike committee and which received financial support from Rotterdam shipping agents. This too led a languishing existence: membership remained limited to 25, presumably also because many workers soon organised themselves into separate associations of grain and coal workers. The tensions in the port of Rotterdam had not abated, however, and in 1896 a new general strike broke out following the introduction of electric cranes.
