= Frederick Platt-Higgins =

British politician

- Platt-Higgins in 1895.

Member of Parliament for Salford North
- In office 7 August 1895 – 8 February 1906
- Prime Minister: Lord Salisbury
- Preceded by: William Henry Holland
- Succeeded by: William Pollard Byles

Personal details
- Born: Frederick Platt; 1840
- Died: 6 November 1910 (aged 69–70) Horsell, near Woking, Surrey
- Party: Conservative
- Spouse: Mary Emily Mottram (m. 1864)

Frederick Platt-Higgins (1840 – 6 November 1910) was a British businessman and Conservative MP for Salford North.

== Early life ==
Born as Frederick Higgins, he was the son of James Higgins of Salford, Lancashire and Elizabeth Meban of Dumfries. He went into business as a cotton spinner and married Mary Emily Mottram of Manchester in 1864. In 1888 his aunt, Margaret Platt of Stalybridge, widow of Robert Platt of Dunham Hall, died. As part of the conditions of her will she required that her nephews adopt the surname Platt-Higgins and quarter the Platt and Higgins coats of arms. This was carried into effect by a royal licence in the following year.

== Career ==
At the 1895 general election Platt-Higgins was elected as Conservative Member of Parliament for Salford North. He retained the seat for eleven years, being unseated at the Liberal landslide at the 1906 general election.

== Personal life ==
Platt-Higgins made his home at "Homeleigh", Bowdon, Cheshire, later retiring to "Woodham Place", Horsell, near Woking, Surrey. He died at Horsell in 1910 of pneumonia.

His daughter Brenda married Major Edward Vincent Osborne Hewett son of the late Leiut. General E O Hewett R.E. C.M.G. in 1904.

Parliament of the United Kingdom
Preceded by William Holland	Member of Parliament for Salford North; 1895–1906	Succeeded by William Byles
