= Dan Milford =

British trade unionist (1876–1950)

Daniel West Milford (3 December 1876 – 10 September 1950) was a Welsh trade unionist.

Born in Cardiff, Milford worked as a docker. He joined the Dock, Wharf, Riverside and General Labourers' Union around the turn of the century, and served as its president from 1913. The dockers' union became part of the Transport and General Workers' Union, and from 1929 Milford served as secretary of its Docks Group, soon additionally becoming secretary of the union's Waterways Group.

Milford retired in 1941, but remained involved with the industry, in 1943 serving on a committee investigating the handling of explosives by dockers. He died in Essex in 1950.

Trade union offices
Preceded by James Wignall?	President of the Dock, Wharf, Riverside and General Labourers' Union; 1913–1922	Succeeded by Position abolished
Preceded by Ernest Bevin	National Secretary (Docks Group) of the Transport and General Workers' Union; 1929–1941	Succeeded by Jack Donovan
Preceded by Harry Gosling	National Secretary (Waterways Group) of the Transport and General Workers' Union; 1930–1941	Succeeded by ?
