= Labor history (disambiguation) =

Labor history is a sub-discipline of social history which specializes on the history of the working classes and the labor movement.

Labor history and labour history may refer to:

- Country-specific movements
  - Australian labour movement, including its history
  - History of trade unions in the United Kingdom
  - Labor history of the United States
- Labor History (journal), an American scholarly publication published by Routledge
- Labour History (journal), an Australian scholarly journal published by the Australian Society for the Study of Labour History

== See also ==
- Trade union
- Working class
