= William Byles =

British newspaper owner and radical Liberal politician

Byles in 1917

Sir William Pollard Byles (13 February 1839 – 15 October 1917) was a British newspaper owner and radical Liberal politician.

== Background ==
Born in Bradford, Yorkshire, in 1839, W P Byles was the son of William Byles, proprietor of the Bradford Observer and Anna Holden of Halifax. He eventually succeeded his father as owner of the newspaper, which had been renamed the Yorkshire Observer. He married Sarah Anne Unwin of Colchester in 1865. They had no children. He was knighted in 1911. One of his nephews was Thomas Byles, a Catholic priest who died during the sinking of RMS Titanic.

== Political career ==
In 1892 he was elected as Liberal Member of Parliament for Shipley. Upon election he became a member of the Inter-Parliamentary Union for Peace and Arbitration. He lost his seat three years later to Fortescue Flannery, his Conservative opponent. Byles was a pacifist, and actively opposed the Second Boer War. In 1900 he stood on an anti-war ticket as Labour Representation Committee candidate at Leeds East, but was defeated. He returned to the Commons at the 1906 general election as Liberal MP for Salford North. He was an advanced radical, a strong supporter of Irish Home Rule and an advocate of Land Reform. Byles retained his seat until his death.

=== Labour relations ===
Byles sought to improve relations between the Liberal Party and the Independent Labour Party. The 1896 Bradford East by-election was an opportunity for the Liberals to re-gain a seat they had lost to the Conservatives in 1895. However, Keir Hardie had decided to intervene as an ILP candidate, making the contest three-way. In an effort to prevent the Conservative winning due to a split ant-Tory vote, Byles attempted to resolve the situation by suggesting himself as a compromise candidate that both parties could support. Hardie re-buffed his overture and the Conservatives held the seat with Hardie finishing a poor third. For his 1900 Leeds candidature, Byles was endorsed as candidate by the Leeds Trades Council who then sought to get him endorsed by the Liberal Association. However, it soon became clear that Byles did not have the full support of all trades with the council's Secretary also seeking the nomination. The Liberals thus chose not to endorse Byles and instead adopt another candidate. Byles decided to run anyway and surprisingly, the Labour Representation Committee stepped in and endorsed him, to the annoyance of many in the local Trades Council who would have happily supported a 'Liberal-Labour' candidate. Byles had thus ended up creating a situation in 1900 that he had sought to avoid in 1896. The outcome of the Leeds East contest was similar to the Bradford East by-election with the Conservative winning due to a split vote. Throughout this period and his career in its entirety, Byles remained a member of the Liberal Party and always took the Liberal whip in the House of Commons. Although he was not a trade unionist, at every election in which he stood he was able to secure the support of his local Trades Council, which is why he is frequently described as 'Liberal-Labour'.

=== Electoral record ===
General election 1892: Shipley
Party	Candidate	Votes	%	±%
Lib-Lab	William Byles	5,746	51.3	n/a
Liberal Unionist	Theophilus Peel	5,464	48.7	n/a
Majority		282	2.6	n/a
Turnout		11,210	76.0	n/a
Registered electors		14,759		
Lib-Lab hold		Swing	n/a	

General election 1895: Shipley
Party	Candidate	Votes	%	±%
Liberal Unionist	James Fortescue Flannery	5,999	50.3	+1.6
Lib-Lab	William Byles	5,921	49.7	−1.6
Majority		78	0.6	n/a
Turnout		11,920	83.0	+7.0
Registered electors		14,353		
Liberal Unionist gain from Lib-Lab		Swing	+1.6	

General election 1900: Leeds East
Party	Candidate	Votes	%	±%
Conservative	Henry Cautley	3,453	54.7	+9.8
Liberal	J. R. Maguire	1,586	25.2	−29.9
Labour Repr. Cmte.	William Byles	1,266	20.1	n/a
Majority		1,867	29.5	n/a
Turnout		6,305	67.5	−9.9
Registered electors		9,336		
Conservative gain from Liberal		Swing	+19.9	

General election 1906: Salford North
Party	Candidate	Votes	%	±%
Lib-Lab	William Byles	4,915	56.9	+12.4
Conservative	Frederick Platt-Higgins	3,728	43.1	−12.4
Majority		1,187	13.8	n/a
Turnout		8,643	90.8	+7.4
Registered electors		9,517		
Lib-Lab gain from Conservative		Swing	+12.4	

General election January 1910: Salford North
Party	Candidate	Votes	%	±%
Lib-Lab	William Byles	4,980	54.7	−2.2
Conservative	Ian Malcolm	4,123	45.3	+2.2
Majority		857	9.4	−4.8
Turnout		9,103	92.4	+1.6
Registered electors		9,850		
Lib-Lab hold		Swing	−2.2	

General election December 1910: Salford North
Party	Candidate	Votes	%	±%
Lib-Lab	William Byles	4,402	51.4	−3.3
Conservative	Cyril Potter	4,163	48.6	+3.3
Majority		239	2.8	−6.6
Turnout		8,565	87.0	−5.4
Registered electors		9,850		
Lib-Lab hold		Swing	−3.3	

Sir William Pollard Byles died in October 1917 at his home in Hampstead, London, aged 78.

Parliament of the United Kingdom
Preceded by Joseph Craven	Member of Parliament for Shipley; 1892–1895	Succeeded by James Fortescue Flannery
Preceded by Frederick Platt-Higgins	Member of Parliament for Salford North; 1906–1917	Succeeded by Benjamin Tillett
