= Salford North =

Parliamentary constituency in the United Kingdom, 1885–1950

- Former borough constituency for the House of Commons
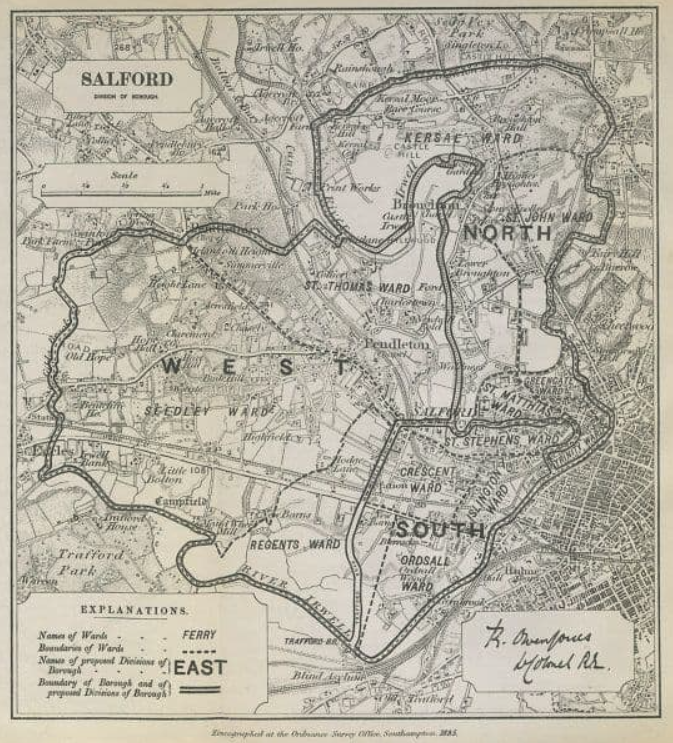
- 1885 map by Robert Owen Jones

1885–1950
- Seats: one
- Created from: Salford
- Replaced by: Salford East and Salford West

Salford North was a parliamentary constituency in the City of Salford in Greater Manchester from 1885 until 1950. It returned one Member of Parliament (MP) to the House of Commons of the Parliament of the United Kingdom.

== History ==
The constituency was created for the 1885 general election by the Redistribution of Seats Act 1885, which split the two-member Salford constituency into three divisions: Salford North, Salford South and Salford West. It was abolished for the 1950 general election.

== Boundaries ==
1885–1918: The Municipal Borough of Salford wards of Greenage, Kersal, St John's, St Matthias, and Trinity.

1918–1950: The County Borough of Salford wards of Albert Park, Charlestown, Grosvenor, Kersal, and St Matthias.

== Members of Parliament ==
Election	Member	Party
1885	Edward Hardcastle	Conservative
1892	William Holland	Liberal
1895	Frederick Platt-Higgins	Conservative
1906	Sir William Pollard Byles	Liberal
1917 by-election	Benjamin Tillett	Ind. Labour
1924	Samuel Finburgh	Conservative
1929	Benjamin Tillett	Labour
1931	John Patrick Morris	Conservative
1945	William McAdam	Labour
1950	constituency abolished	

== Elections ==
=== Elections in the 1880s ===
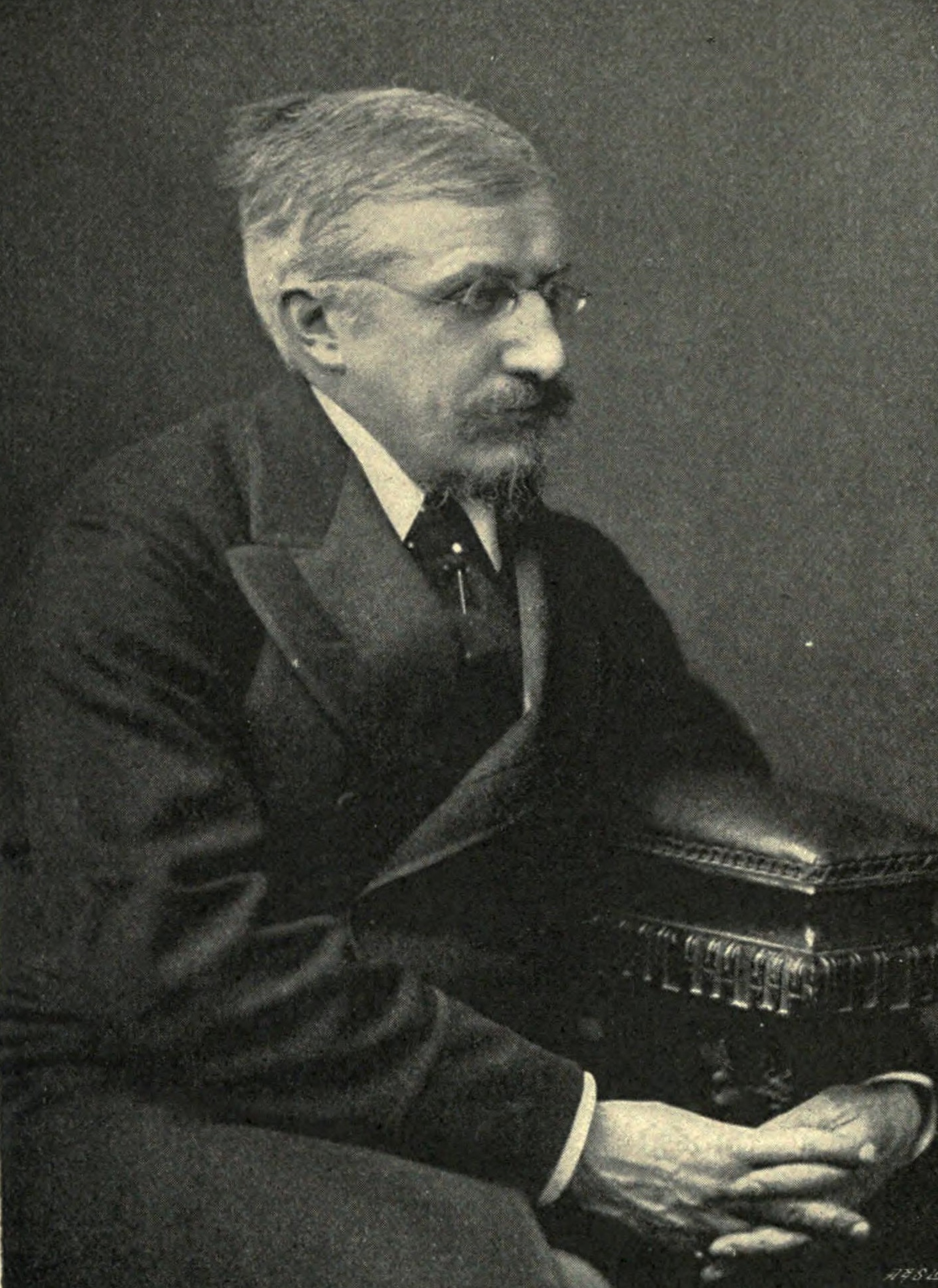
Arnold

General election 1885: Salford North
Party	Candidate	Votes	%	±%
Conservative	Edward Hardcastle	3,519	51.3	
Liberal	Arthur Arnold	3,343	48.7	
Majority		176	2.6	
Turnout		6,862	88.8	
Registered electors		7,728		
Conservative win (new seat)				

General election 1886: Salford North
Party	Candidate	Votes	%	±%
Conservative	Edward Hardcastle	3,326	51.2	−0.1
Liberal	Arthur Arnold	3,169	48.8	+0.1
Majority		157	2.4	−0.2
Turnout		6,495	84.0	−4.8
Registered electors		7,728		
Conservative hold		Swing	−0.1	

=== Elections in the 1890s ===
Holland

General election 1892: Salford North
Party	Candidate	Votes	%	±%
Liberal	William Holland	3,686	52.0	+3.2
Conservative	Arthur Baumann	3,399	48.0	−3.2
Majority		287	4.0	N/A
Turnout		7,085	86.0	+2.0
Registered electors		8,238		
Liberal gain from Conservative		Swing	+3.2	

Platt-Higgins

General election 1895: Salford North
Party	Candidate	Votes	%	±%
Conservative	Frederick Platt-Higgins	3,787	50.0	+2.0
Liberal	William Holland	3,781	50.0	−2.0
Majority		6	0.0	N/A
Turnout		7,568	85.7	−0.3
Registered electors		8,828		
Conservative gain from Liberal		Swing	+2.0	

=== Elections in the 1900s ===
General election 1900: Salford North
Party	Candidate	Votes	%	±%
Conservative	Frederick Platt-Higgins	4,370	55.5	+5.5
Liberal	John Edward Lawton	3,497	44.5	−5.5
Majority		873	11.0	+11.0
Turnout		7,867	83.4	−2.3
Registered electors		9,432		
Conservative hold		Swing	+5.5	

General election 1906: Salford North
Party	Candidate	Votes	%	±%
Lib-Lab	William Pollard Byles	4,915	56.9	+12.4
Conservative	Frederick Platt-Higgins	3,728	43.1	−12.4
Majority		1,187	13.8	N/A
Turnout		8,643	90.8	+7.4
Registered electors		9,517		
Lib-Lab gain from Conservative		Swing	+12.4	

=== Elections in the 1910s ===
Byles

General election January 1910: Salford North
Party	Candidate	Votes	%	±%
Lib-Lab	William Pollard Byles	4,980	54.7	−2.2
Conservative	Ian Malcolm	4,123	45.3	+2.2
Majority		857	9.4	−4.8
Turnout		9,103	92.4	+1.6
Registered electors		9,850		
Lib-Lab hold		Swing	−2.2	

Potter

General election December 1910: Salford North
Party	Candidate	Votes	%	±%
Lib-Lab	William Pollard Byles	4,402	51.4	−3.3
Conservative	Cyril Charlie Hamilton Potter	4,163	48.6	+3.3
Majority		239	2.8	−6.6
Turnout		8,565	87.0	−5.4
Registered electors		9,850		
Lib-Lab hold		Swing	−3.3	

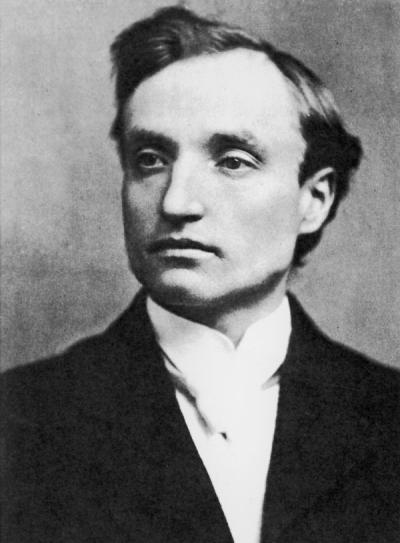
Tillett

General Election 1914–15:

Another General Election was required to take place before the end of 1915. The political parties had been making preparations for an election to take place and by July 1914, the following candidates had been selected;

- Liberal: William Pollard Byles
- Unionist: Cyril Charlie Hamilton Potter
- Labour: Benjamin Tillett

Mallet

1917 Salford North by-election
Party	Candidate	Votes	%	±%
Independent Labour	Ben Tillett	2,822	64.6	New
Liberal	Charles Mallet	1,545	35.4	−16.0
Majority		1,277	29.2	N/A
Turnout		4,367	41.1	−45.9
Registered electors		10,623		
Independent Labour gain from Lib-Lab		Swing		

General election 1918: Salford North
Party	Candidate	Votes	%	±%
Labour	Ben Tillett	12,079	74.4	N/A
Liberal	Frederick William Roe Rycroft	4,155	25.6	−25.8
Majority		7,924	48.8	N/A
Turnout		16,234	47.1	−39.9
Registered electors		34,490		
Labour gain from Independent Labour		Swing		

=== Elections in the 1920s ===
General election 1922: Salford North
Party	Candidate	Votes	%	±%
Labour	Ben Tillett	11,368	41.5	−33.9
Unionist	Samuel Finburgh	11,349	41.5	New
Liberal	John Catterall Jolly	4,660	17.0	−8.6
Majority		19	0.0	−48.8
Turnout		27,377	78.7	+31.6
Registered electors		34,780		
Labour hold		Swing		

General election 1923: Salford North
Party	Candidate	Votes	%	±%
Labour	Ben Tillett	13,377	51.1	+9.6
Unionist	Samuel Finburgh	12,810	48.9	+7.4
Majority		567	2.2	+2.2
Turnout		26,187	73.9	−4.8
Registered electors		35,441		
Labour hold		Swing	+1.1	

General election 1924: Salford North
Party	Candidate	Votes	%	±%
Unionist	Samuel Finburgh	14,250	45.7	−3.2
Labour	Ben Tillett	13,114	42.1	−9.0
Liberal	John Rothwell	3,818	12.2	New
Majority		1,136	3.6	N/A
Turnout		31,182	85.8	+11.9
Registered electors		36,332		
Unionist gain from Labour		Swing	+2.9	

General election 1929: Salford North
Party	Candidate	Votes	%	±%
Labour	Ben Tillett	17,333	46.2	+4.1
Unionist	Leslie Haden-Guest	13,607	36.2	−9.5
Liberal	John Rothwell	6,609	17.6	+5.4
Majority		3,726	10.0	N/A
Turnout		37,549	80.0	−5.8
Registered electors		46,938		
Labour gain from Unionist		Swing	−6.8	

=== Elections in the 1930s ===
General election 1931: Salford North
Party	Candidate	Votes	%	±%
Conservative	John Patrick Morris	25,151	65.5	+29.3
Labour	Ben Tillett	13,271	34.5	−11.7
Majority		11,880	31.0	N/A
Turnout		38,422	78.9	−1.1
Registered electors		48,675		
Conservative gain from Labour		Swing	+20.5	

General election 1935: Salford North
Party	Candidate	Votes	%	±%
Conservative	John Patrick Morris	19,904	56.6	−8.9
Labour	William McAdam	15,272	43.4	+8.9
Majority		4,632	13.2	−17.8
Turnout		35,176	74.0	−4.9
Registered electors		47,557		
Conservative hold		Swing	−8.9	

=== Elections in the 1940s ===
General election 1945: Salford North
Party	Candidate	Votes	%	±%
Labour	William McAdam	18,327	60.5	+17.1
Conservative	J.E. Fitzsimons	11,977	39.5	−17.1
Majority		6,350	21.0	N/A
Turnout		30,304	72.5	−1.5
Registered electors		41,811		
Labour gain from Conservative		Swing	+17.1	
