= John Morris (Conservative politician) =

British politician (1894–1962)

John Patrick Morris (1894 - 31 July 1962) was a British Conservative Party politician who served as the Member of Parliament (MP) for Salford North from 1931 until 1945. He was educated at secondary school in Bolton, saw active service with the Royal Engineers in the First World War, and was a member of the London Stock Exchange and Manchester Stock Exchange. He is noted for highlighting the persecution of the Jews in pre-war Nazi Germany, having brought up the issue in the House of Commons in 1933.
