= Ben Tillett =

British politician (1860–1943)

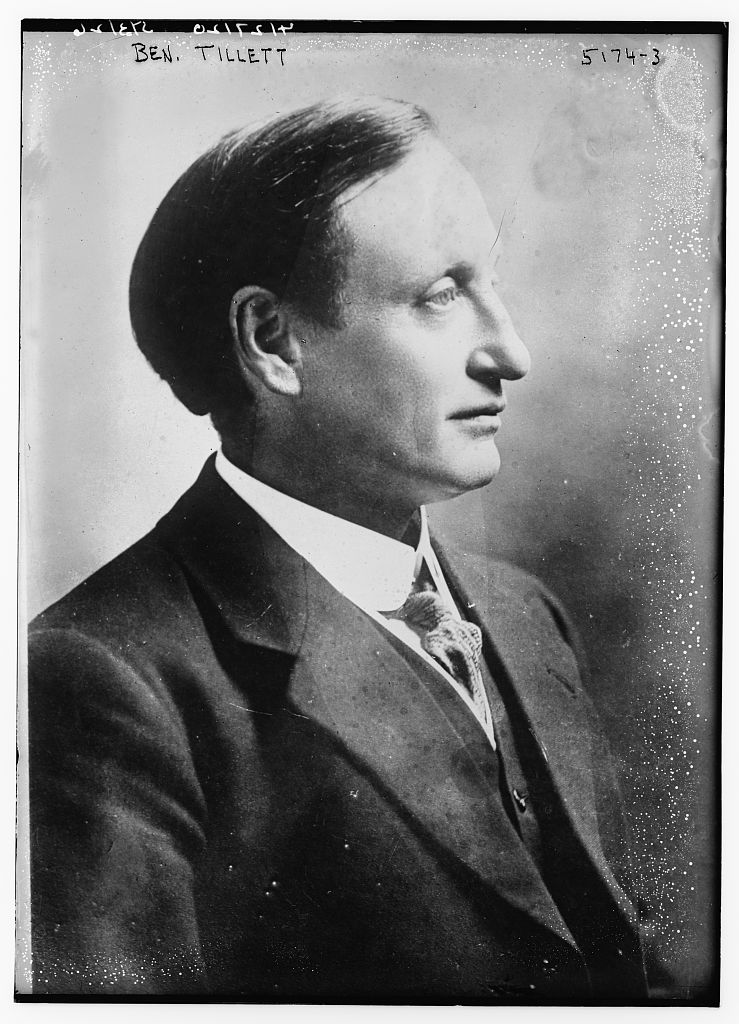
Ben Tillett in 1920

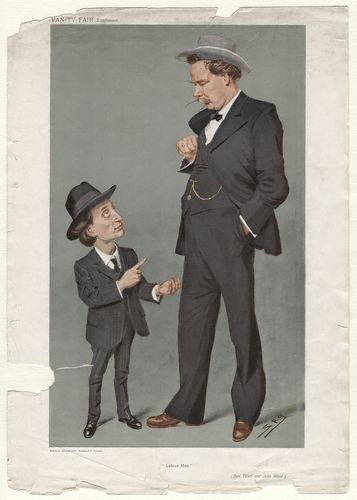
Ben Tillett and John Ward caricatured by Spy for Vanity Fair, 1908

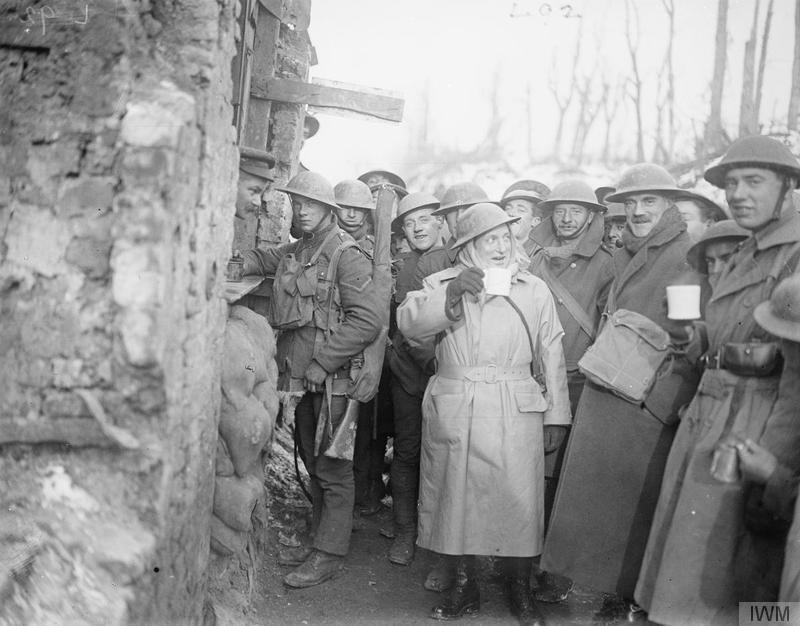
Tillett with British troops on the western front, January 1918

Benjamin Tillett (11 September 1860 – 27 January 1943) was a British socialist, trade union leader and politician. He was a leader of the "new unionism" of 1889, that focused on organizing unskilled workers. He played a major role in founding the Dockers Union, and played a prominent role as a strike leader in dock strikes in 1911 and 1912. He enthusiastically supported the war effort in the First World War. He was pushed aside by Ernest Bevin during the consolidation that created the Transport and General Workers' Union in 1922, who gave Tillett a subordinate position. Scholars stress his evangelical dedication to the labour cause, while noting his administrative weaknesses. Clegg Fox and Thompson described him as a demagogue and agitator grasping for fleeting popularity.

== Early career ==
Tillett was born in Bristol. He started work in a brickyard at eight years of age and was a "Risley" boy for two years. At 12 years of age, he served for six months on a fishing smack, was afterwards apprenticed to a bootmaker, and then joined the Royal Navy. He was invalided out of the navy and made several voyages in merchant ships. Tillett then settled at the London Docks, and took up work as a docker.

== Trade union activities ==
He began his career as a trade union organiser in 1887 by forming the Tea Operatives and General Labourers Union at Tilbury docks. Tillett and his union, renamed the Dock, Wharf, Riverside and General Labourers' Union, rose to prominence during the London dock strike of 1889, although the strike itself began without union involvement. Tillett also played a prominent role as a strike leader in dock strikes in 1911 and 1912. He was instrumental in forming the National Transport Workers' Federation in 1910, along with Havelock Wilson of the Seamen's Union.

Tillett's union was the largest of the unions which came together in 1922 to form the Transport and General Workers' Union, however, it was Tillett's deputy, Ernest Bevin, rather than Tillett himself, who took the major role in bringing about the amalgamation. Bevin became the General Secretary of the new union, but Tillett held the post of International and Political Secretary until 1931 and retained his seat on the General Council of the Trades Union Congress until 1932.

By the turn of the 20th Century a blind workforce was now established in the labour market.

They were prominently employed in craft trades such as weaving, basket making and piano tuning. In an era dominated by unionisation the National League of the Blind (NLB) was registered in 1899 and was soon affiliated with both the Trade Union Congress (TUC) and Labour Party. By 1912 they had called their first strike in Bristol over non-existent pension schemes for their members a majority of whom were living in poverty.

One of the many horrors of World War One was the number of soldiers who returned home after being blinded in conflict.

Persistent lobbying by the NLB forced the Government to set up an Advisory Committee for the Welfare of the Blind. It was chaired by Tillett. His 1920 Private Members Bill titled Blind (Education, Employment and Maintenance) began the dialogue towards a new way of thinking. He set the tone when telling the chamber, 'I do not want a period of war to be the only period when we sit up and take notice. Physical deterioration should be a thing of grave concern to all of us at any period'. His 1920 Private Members Bill titled Blind (Education, Employment and Maintenance) began the dialogue towards a new way of thinking. He set the tone when telling the chamber, 'I do not want a period of war to be the only period when we sit up and take notice. Physical deterioration should be a thing of grave concern to all of us at any period'.

== Political career ==
Tillett was a member of the Fabian Society and a founding member of the Independent Labour Party, but subsequently joined the Social Democratic Federation instead. He also joined the Bristol Socialist Society in the 1880s, when he often travelled to that city. At the 1892 United Kingdom general election, he was sponsored by the Bradford Labour Union and Bradford Trades Council to stand in Bradford West. He won 30.2% of the vote, but took third place and was not elected.

Tillett began a political career as an alderman on the London County Council from 1892 to 1898 and was a Labour Party Member of Parliament (MP) for Salford North from 1917 to 1924 and again from 1929 to 1931. Before his victory at the Salford North by-election in 1917 as an independent candidate, he had stood unsuccessfully for Parliament at four general elections: Bradford West in 1892 and 1895; at Eccles in 1906; and at Swansea in January 1910. He often disagreed with the liberal tendencies of the Labour Party, claiming in 1918 that 'If the Labour Party could select a King, he would be a feminist, a Temperance crank, a Nonconformist charlatan...an anti-sport, anti-jollity advocate, a teetotaller, as well as a general wet blanket.'

Tillett courted controversy with some of his supporters in the labour movement through his outspoken support of Britain's involvement in the First World War, an issue which split the Labour Party. In article in the 3 July 1915 issue of The Illustrated London News, the pro-war writer G. K. Chesterton offered his explanation:

It is the moderate Socialists who are Pacifists; the fighting Socialists are patriots. Mr. Ben Tillett would have been regarded by Mr. Ramsay MacDonald as a mere firebrand; but it is precisely because Mr. Tillet was ready to go on fighting Capitalism that he is ready to go on fighting Krupp. It is precisely because Mr. Macdonald was weak in his opposition to domestic tyrants, that he is weak in his opposition to foreign ones. The wobblers who wanted a one-sided arbitration to end the strikes would to-day accept a one-sided arbitration to end the battles. But the men who wanted strikes want nothing but shells. That great artist, Mr. Will Dyson, laid aside the lethal pencil with which he had caricatured the sweaters and the middlemen, and sharpened a yet deadlier one to draw all the devils in Prussia.

Before the First World War, Tillett had defended the idea of an international general strike in case of war, but like most trade union leaders, Tillett decided in 1914 to support the British war aims, writing a pamphlet published in 1917, "Who was Responsible for the war and why ?" in which he declared "Despite our former pacifist attitude, the forces of Labour in England have supported the government throughout the war. We realised that this is a fight for world freedom against a carefully engineered plan to establish a world autocracy".

=== Opposition to Jewish immigration ===
In contrast to his support for friendly relations between English and Irish Catholic dockworkers in the East End of London Tillett was strongly opposed to Jewish immigration. Tillett associated Jewish arrivals with creating undesirable working conditions and poor housing: "the influx of continental pauperism aggravates and multiplies the number of ills which press so heavily on us...foreigners come to London in large numbers, herd together in habitations unfit for beasts, the sweating system allowing the more grasping and shrewd a life of comparative ease in superintending their work".

In 1891, Tillett formulated what the historian Satnam Virdee has described as a "proto-fascist discourse" in a series of letters to the London Evening News. Tillett argued that Jewish workers should be removed from Britain and that British politicians were in thrall to Jewish financial power: 'Our leading statesmen do not care to offend the great banking houses or money kings.... For heavens' sake, give us back our own countrymen and take from us your motley multitude.'

== Death ==
Tillett died on 27 January 1943, aged 82.

== Works ==
- A Brief History of the Dockers' Union, commemorating the 1889 dockers' strike (1910)
- A History of the London Transport Workers' Strike (1911)
- Some Russian Impressions (1925)
- Memories and Reflections, an autobiography (1931)

Trade union offices
Preceded by New position	General Secretary of the International Transport Workers' Federation; 1896	Succeeded by Robert Peddie
Preceded by Pete Curran and John Weir	Trades Union Congress representative to the American Federation of Labor; 1901; With: Francis Chandler	Succeeded by Matthew Arrandale and Enoch Edwards
Preceded by Tom Chambers	President and General Secretary of the International Transport Workers' Federation; 1904	Succeeded by Hermann Jochade
Preceded by Ben Turner	President of the Trades Union Congress; 1929	Succeeded by John Beard
Parliament of the United Kingdom
Preceded by Sir William Byles	Member of Parliament for Salford North; 1917–1924	Succeeded by Samuel Finburgh
Preceded by Sir Samuel Finburgh	Member of Parliament for Salford North; 1929–1931	Succeeded by John Morris
