= Samuel Finburgh =

British politician (1867–1935)

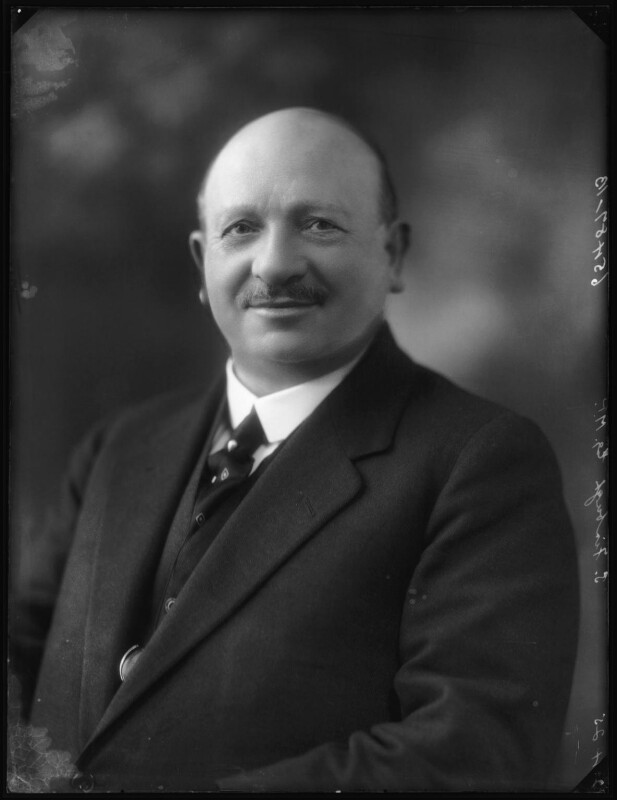
Finburgh in 1925

Samuel Finburgh, JP (1867 – 26 April 1935) was Conservative MP for Salford North.

A calico printer and cotton manufacturer with mills in Parliament Street, Burnley, he contested the seat in 1922 and 1923, won it in 1924, but stood down in 1929. He was Mayor of Salford in 1929.

Finsburgh was Jewish. During his time in Parliament, in 1925, he challenged the Home Secretary William Joynson-Hicks about his treatment of the Jewish community, alleging that Jewish applicants for naturalisation were facing undue obstacles.

== Sources ==
- Craig, F.W.S. British Parliamentary Election Results 1918-1949
- Whitaker's Almanack 1923 to 1929 editions
