= 1936 Salford City Council election =

Local election in Salford

- 2 November 1936

16 of 64 seats on Salford City Council 33 seats needed for a majority
| | First party | Second party | Third party |
|---|---|---|---|
| Party | Labour | Conservative | Independent |
| Last election | 8 seats, 50.0% | 5 seats, 30.9% | 3 seats, 17.6% |
| Seats before | 31 | 23 | 8 |
| Seats won | 8 | 7 | 1 |
| Seats after | 30 | 24 | 8 |
| Seat change | ▼1 | ▲1 | Steady |
| Popular vote | 21,397 | 21,252 | 2,588 |
| Percentage | 46.0% | 45.6% | 5.6% |
| Swing | ▼4.0% | ▲14.7% | ▼12.0% |
| | Fourth party |
| Party | Liberal |
| Last election | 0 seats, 1.5% |
| Seats before | 2 |
| Seats won | 0 |
| Seats after | 2 |
| Seat change | Steady |
| Popular vote | 1,326 |
| Percentage | 2.8% |
| Swing | ▲1.3% |
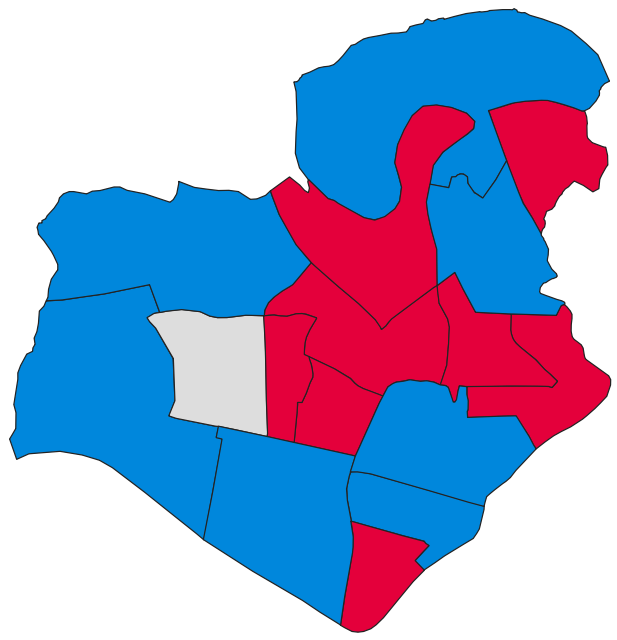
- Map of results of 1936 election
Leader of the Council before election
No overall control
Leader of the Council after election
No overall control

Elections to Salford City Council were held on Monday, 2 November 1936. One-third of the councillors seats were up for election, with each successful candidate to serve a three-year term of office. The council remained under no overall control.

== Election result ==
| Party | Votes | | Seats | | | Full Council | |
| Labour Party | 21,397 (46.0%) | ▼4.0 | 8 (50.0%) | 8 / 16 | ▼1 | 30 (46.9%) | 30 / 64 |
| Conservative Party | 21,252 (45.6%) | ▲14.7 | 7 (43.8%) | 7 / 16 | ▲1 | 24 (37.5%) | 24 / 64 |
| Independent | 2,588 (5.6%) | ▼12.0 | 1 (6.3%) | 1 / 16 | Steady | 8 (12.5%) | 8 / 64 |
| Liberal Party | 1,326 (2.8%) | ▲1.3 | 0 (0.0%) | 0 / 16 | Steady | 2 (3.1%) | 2 / 64 |

=== Full council ===
↓
| 30 | 2 | 8 | 24 |

=== Aldermen ===
↓
| 9 | 2 | 1 | 4 |

=== Councillors ===
↓
| 21 | 7 | 20 |

== Ward results ==
=== Albert Park ===
Albert Park
| Party | Candidate | Votes | % | ±% |
|---|---|---|---|---|
| Conservative | C. P. Hampson | 1,753 | 59.1 | +2.7 |
| Labour | W. Wolfson | 1,211 | 40.9 | −2.7 |
| Majority | | 542 | 18.2 | +5.4 |
| Turnout | | 2,964 | | |
| Conservative gain from Labour | | Swing | | |

=== Charlestown ===
Charlestown
| Party | Candidate | Votes | % | ±% |
|---|---|---|---|---|
| Labour | J. Brentnall* | 2,086 | 55.4 | −0.9 |
| Conservative | W. Soar | 1,676 | 44.6 | N/A |
| Majority | | 410 | 10.8 | −1.8 |
| Turnout | | 3,762 | | |
| Labour hold | | Swing | | |

=== Claremont ===
Claremont
| Party | Candidate | Votes | % | ±% |
|---|---|---|---|---|
| Conservative | G. Fearnehough* | 1,996 | 51.2 | N/A |
| Liberal | R. Pugh | 964 | 24.7 | N/A |
| Labour | M. C. Whitehead | 935 | 24.1 | −5.5 |
| Majority | | 1,032 | 26.5 | |
| Turnout | | 3,895 | | |
| Conservative hold | | Swing | | |

=== Crescent ===
Crescent
| Party | Candidate | Votes | % | ±% |
|---|---|---|---|---|
| Conservative | G. Johnson | 1,539 | 52.8 | N/A |
| Labour | F. Lee | 1,377 | 47.2 | −2.2 |
| Majority | | 162 | 5.6 | |
| Turnout | | 2,916 | | |
| Conservative gain from Labour | | Swing | | |

=== Docks ===
Docks
| Party | Candidate | Votes | % | ±% |
|---|---|---|---|---|
| Conservative | J. T. Harrison* | 1,634 | 58.3 | 0 |
| Labour | R. W. Roskell | 1,169 | 41.7 | 0 |
| Majority | | 465 | 16.6 | 0 |
| Turnout | | 2,803 | | |
| Conservative hold | | Swing | | |

=== Kersal ===
Kersal
| Party | Candidate | Votes | % | ±% |
|---|---|---|---|---|
| Conservative | W. Crookell* | 1,466 | 64.5 | −1.7 |
| Labour | T. C. Loftus | 807 | 35.5 | +1.7 |
| Majority | | 659 | 29.0 | −3.4 |
| Turnout | | 2,273 | | |
| Conservative hold | | Swing | | |

=== Langworthy ===
Langworthy
| Party | Candidate | Votes | % | ±% |
|---|---|---|---|---|
| Labour | J. Openshaw | 1,466 | 49.4 | +1.0 |
| Conservative | T. W. Buck* | 1,366 | 46.1 | −5.5 |
| Liberal | L. H. Storey | 134 | 4.5 | N/A |
| Majority | | 100 | 3.3 | |
| Turnout | | 2,966 | | |
| Labour gain from Conservative | | Swing | | |

=== Mandley Park ===
Mandley Park
| Party | Candidate | Votes | % | ±% |
|---|---|---|---|---|
| Labour | W. Crabtree* | 1,734 | 51.4 | −7.9 |
| Conservative | J. Whiteley | 1,640 | 48.6 | +7.9 |
| Majority | | 94 | 2.8 | −15.8 |
| Turnout | | 3,374 | | |
| Labour hold | | Swing | | |

=== Ordsall Park ===
Ordsall Park
| Party | Candidate | Votes | % | ±% |
|---|---|---|---|---|
| Labour | F. J. Lynch* | 1,608 | 52.0 | −10.0 |
| Conservative | A. Eccleshall | 1,482 | 48.0 | +10.0 |
| Majority | | 126 | 4.0 | −20.0 |
| Turnout | | 3,090 | | |
| Labour hold | | Swing | | |

=== Regent ===
Regent
| Party | Candidate | Votes | % | ±% |
|---|---|---|---|---|
| Conservative | J. Clark | 1,682 | 50.3 | +12.6 |
| Labour | J. H. R. Caldwell | 1,662 | 49.7 | −12.6 |
| Majority | | 20 | 0.6 | |
| Turnout | | 3,344 | | |
| Conservative gain from Labour | | Swing | | |

=== St. Matthias' ===
St. Matthias'
| Party | Candidate | Votes | % | ±% |
|---|---|---|---|---|
| Labour | F. Cowin* | 1,712 | 55.4 | −6.4 |
| Conservative | W. Dalglish | 1,376 | 44.6 | +6.4 |
| Majority | | 336 | 10.8 | −12.8 |
| Turnout | | 3,088 | | |
| Labour hold | | Swing | | |

=== St. Paul's ===
St. Paul's
| Party | Candidate | Votes | % | ±% |
|---|---|---|---|---|
| Labour | V. A. Darley* | 1,077 | 50.6 | −14.7 |
| Conservative | H. H. Hindley | 823 | 38.7 | N/A |
| Liberal | W. H. J. Evans | 228 | 10.7 | −24.0 |
| Majority | | 254 | 11.9 | −18.7 |
| Turnout | | 2,128 | | |
| Labour hold | | Swing | | |

=== St. Thomas' ===
St. Thomas'
| Party | Candidate | Votes | % | ±% |
|---|---|---|---|---|
| Labour | W. Heaton | 1,336 | 53.9 | +1.9 |
| Conservative | S. Cortis | 1,142 | 46.1 | −1.9 |
| Majority | | 194 | 7.8 | +3.8 |
| Turnout | | 2,478 | | |
| Labour gain from Conservative | | Swing | | |

=== Seedley ===
Seedley
| Party | Candidate | Votes | % | ±% |
|---|---|---|---|---|
| Independent | C. J. Townsend* | 1,556 | 65.0 | −3.9 |
| Labour | A. Richardson | 838 | 35.0 | +3.9 |
| Majority | | 718 | 30.0 | −7.8 |
| Turnout | | 2,394 | | |
| Independent hold | | Swing | | |

=== Trinity ===
Trinity
| Party | Candidate | Votes | % | ±% |
|---|---|---|---|---|
| Labour | J. Shlosberg* | 1,499 | 59.2 | +3.6 |
| Independent | C. Kelsey | 1,032 | 40.8 | −3.6 |
| Majority | | 467 | 18.4 | +7.2 |
| Turnout | | 2,531 | | |
| Labour hold | | Swing | | |

=== Weaste ===
Weaste
| Party | Candidate | Votes | % | ±% |
|---|---|---|---|---|
| Conservative | S. Daber* | 1,677 | 65.6 | +3.3 |
| Labour | J. Johnson | 880 | 34.4 | −3.3 |
| Majority | | 797 | 31.2 | +6.6 |
| Turnout | | 2,557 | | |
| Conservative hold | | Swing | | |

== Aldermanic elections ==
=== Aldermanic elections, 3 March 1937 ===
Caused by the death on 2 February 1937 of Alderman John Bratherton (Conservative, elected as an alderman by the council on 4 May 1927).

In his place, Councillor William Greenwood (Conservative, Mandley Park, elected 28 November 1935; previously 1912–27, Alderman 1927–35) was elected as an alderman by the council on 3 March 1937.

| Party | Alderman | Ward | Term expires |
|---|---|---|---|
| Conservative | William Greenwood | | 1935 |

Caused by the death on 11 February 1937 of Alderman Benjamin Littler (Conservative, elected as an alderman by the council on 31 October 1923).

In his place, Councillor James Higginbottom (Independent, Crescent, elected 1 November 1935; previously 1920–32, Alderman 1932–35) was elected as an alderman by the council on 3 March 1937.

| Party | Alderman | Ward | Term expires |
|---|---|---|---|
| Independent | James Higginbottom | | 1938 |

== By-elections between 1936 and 1937 ==
=== Mandley Park, 24 March 1937 ===
Caused by the election as an alderman of Councillor William Greenwood (Conservative, Mandley Park, elected 28 November 1935; previously 1912–27, Alderman 1927–35) on 3 March 1937, following the death on 2 February 1937 of Alderman John Bratherton (Conservative, elected as an alderman by the council on 4 May 1927).

Mandley Park
| Party | Candidate | Votes | % | ±% |
|---|---|---|---|---|
| Conservative | J. Whiteley | 1,316 | 56.7 | +8.1 |
| Labour | J. Jackson | 1,004 | 43.3 | −8.1 |
| Majority | | 312 | 13.4 | |
| Turnout | | 2,320 | | |
| Conservative hold | | Swing | | |

=== By-elections, 15 April 1937 ===
Two by-elections were held on 15 April 1937 to fill vacancies which had arisen in the city council.

==== Crescent ====
Caused by the election as an alderman of Councillor James Higginbottom (Independent, Crescent, elected 1 November 1935; previously 1920–32, Alderman 1932–35) on 3 March 1937, following the death on 11 February 1937 of Alderman Benjamin Littler (Conservative, elected as an alderman by the council on 31 October 1923).

Crescent
| Party | Candidate | Votes | % | ±% |
|---|---|---|---|---|
| Conservative | W. G. Faulkner | 1,209 | 52.4 | −0.4 |
| Labour | F. Lee | 1,099 | 47.6 | +0.4 |
| Majority | | 110 | 4.8 | −0.8 |
| Turnout | | 2,308 | | |
| Conservative gain from Independent | | Swing | | |

==== St. Paul's ====
Caused by the death of Councillor Percy Moulson (Labour, St. Paul's, elected 28 November 1935; previously 1932–35) on 12 March 1937.

St. Paul's
| Party | Candidate | Votes | % | ±% |
|---|---|---|---|---|
| Labour | W. Merrick | 1,155 | 55.7 | +5.1 |
| Conservative | V. Georgeson | 920 | 44.3 | +5.6 |
| Majority | | 235 | 11.4 | −0.5 |
| Turnout | | 2,075 | | |
| Labour hold | | Swing | | |
