= 1945 Salford City Council election =

Local election in Salford

- 1 November 1945

27 of 64 seats on Salford City Council 33 seats needed for a majority
	First party	Second party	Third party
Party	Labour	Conservative	Liberal
Last election	7 seats, 44.3%	7 seats, 51.1%	1 seats, 4.6%
Seats before	26	34	2
Seats won	23	3	0
Seats after	34	26	2
Seat change	▲8	▼8	Steady
Popular vote	48,461	29,487	2,483
Percentage	59.0%	35.9%	3.0%
Swing	▲14.7%	▼15.2%	▼1.6%
	Fourth party
Party	Independent
Last election	1 seats, 0.0%
Seats before	2
Seats won	1
Seats after	2
Seat change	Steady
Popular vote	1,736
Percentage	2.1%
Swing	▲2.1%
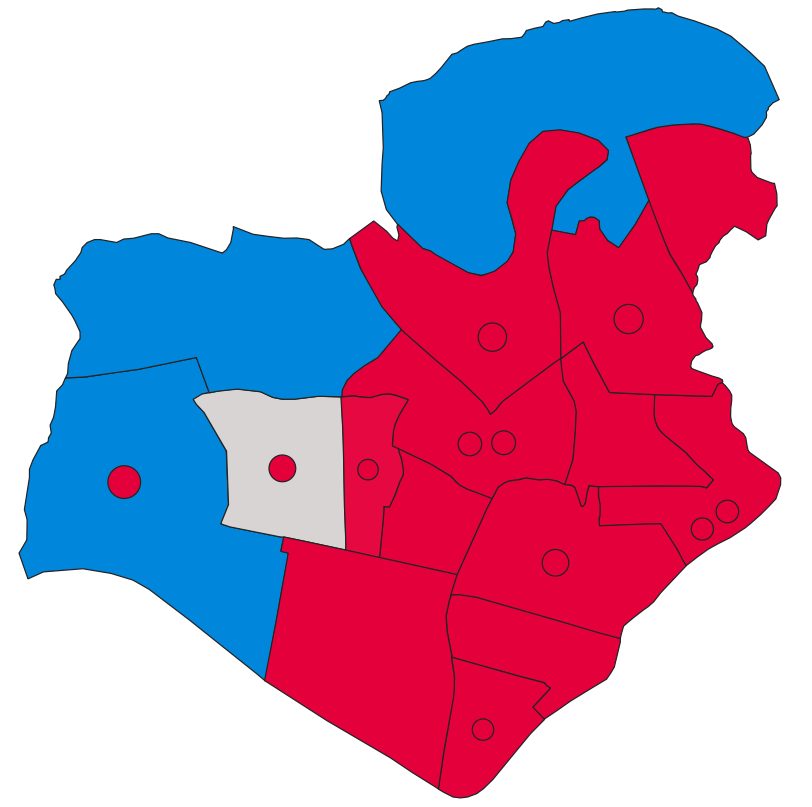
- Map of results of 1945 election
Leader of the Council before election
Conservative
Leader of the Council after election
Labour

Elections to Salford City Council were held on Thursday, 1 November 1945. One-third of the councillors seats were up for election, with each successful candidate to serve a three-year term of office. The Labour Party gained overall control of the council from the Conservative Party. These were the first local elections held in Salford since the outbreak of the Second World War.

== Election result ==
Party	Votes		Seats			Full Council	
Labour Party	48,461 (59.0%)	▲14.7	23 (85.2%)	23 / 27	▲8	34 (53.1%)	34 / 64
Conservative Party	29,487 (35.9%)	▼15.2	3 (11.1%)	3 / 27	▼8	26 (40.6%)	26 / 64
Liberal Party	2,483 (3.0%)	▼1.6	0 (0.0%)	0 / 27	Steady	2 (3.1%)	2 / 64
Independent	1,736 (2.1%)	▲2.1	1 (3.7%)	1 / 27	Steady	2 (3.1%)	2 / 64

=== Full council ===
↓
34	2	2	26

=== Aldermen ===
↓
6	1	1	8

=== Councillors ===
↓
28	1	1	18

== Ward results ==
=== Albert Park ===
Albert Park (2 vacancies)
Party	Candidate	Votes	%	±%
Labour	J. W. Bacon	2,314	58.1	+19.6
Labour	G. D. Franks	2,229	55.9	+17.4
Conservative	F. Walters*	1,738	43.6	−17.9
Conservative	W. Stonex	1,687	42.3	−19.2
Majority		491	12.3	
Turnout		3,985		
Labour gain from Conservative		Swing		
Labour gain from Conservative		Swing		

=== Charlestown ===
Charlestown (2 vacancies)
Party	Candidate	Votes	%	±%
Labour	J. Brentnall*	2,650	72.2	+14.1
Labour	T. C. Loftus*	2,528	68.9	+10.8
Conservative	A. Mason	1,082	29.5	−12.4
Majority		1,446	39.4	+23.2
Turnout		3,671		
Labour hold		Swing		
Labour hold		Swing		

=== Claremont ===
Claremont
Party	Candidate	Votes	%	±%
Conservative	G. Fearnehough*	2,247	42.1	−3.7
Labour	E. H. Hulse	1,983	37.1	N/A
Liberal	A. Huddart	1,110	20.8	−33.4
Majority		264	5.0	
Turnout		5,340		
Conservative hold		Swing		

=== Crescent ===
Crescent (2 vacancies)
Party	Candidate	Votes	%	±%
Labour	E. E. Mallinson	1,180	58.5	+5.3
Labour	G. A. Marshall	1,123	55.7	+2.5
Conservative	J. R. Carter	864	42.9	−3.9
Conservative	G. Johnson*	864	42.9	−3.9
Majority		259	12.8	+6.4
Turnout		2,016		
Labour gain from Conservative		Swing		
Labour hold		Swing		

=== Docks ===
Docks
Party	Candidate	Votes	%	±%
Labour	J. H. Welch	1,949	64.4	+22.3
Conservative	A. Davies*	1,079	35.6	−22.3
Majority		870	28.8	
Turnout		3,028		
Labour gain from Conservative		Swing		

=== Kersal ===
Kersal
Party	Candidate	Votes	%	±%
Conservative	S. B. James*	1,773	42.8	−20.6
Labour	H. Cahm	1,611	38.9	+2.3
Liberal	W. E. Lawton	761	18.3	N/A
Majority		162	3.9	−22.9
Turnout		4,145		
Conservative hold		Swing		

=== Langworthy ===
Langworthy (2 vacancies)
Party	Candidate	Votes	%	±%
Labour	J. Openshaw*	2,190	61.6	+13.3
Labour	M. C. Whitehead*	2,029	57.1	+8.8
Conservative	G. M. McDonald	1,445	40.6	−11.1
Majority		584	16.4	
Turnout		3,555		
Labour hold		Swing		
Labour hold		Swing		

=== Mandley Park ===
Mandley Park
Party	Candidate	Votes	%	±%
Labour	W. W. Crabtree*	2,455	61.2	+13.7
Conservative	W. Wignall	1,555	38.8	−13.7
Majority		900	22.4	
Turnout		4,010		
Labour hold		Swing		

=== Ordsall Park ===
Ordsall Park (2 vacancies)
Party	Candidate	Votes	%	±%
Labour	F. J. Lynch*	2,321	69.4	+16.8
Labour	W. Petrie	2,237	66.9	+14.3
Conservative	E. Welch	1,084	32.4	−15.0
Conservative	B. A. Fox	1,047	31.3	−16.1
Majority		1,153	34.5	+29.3
Turnout		3,345		
Labour hold		Swing		
Labour hold		Swing		

=== Regent ===
Regent
Party	Candidate	Votes	%	±%
Labour	T. J. Evason	2,176	63.3	+11.0
Conservative	A. E. Clark*	1,259	36.7	−11.0
Majority		917	26.6	+22.0
Turnout		3,435		
Labour gain from Conservative		Swing		

=== St. Matthias' ===
St. Matthias'
Party	Candidate	Votes	%	±%
Labour	F. Cowin*	1,795	59.4	+4.8
Conservative	W. S. Lappin	1,226	40.6	−4.8
Majority		569	18.8	+9.6
Turnout		3,021		
Labour hold		Swing		

=== St. Paul's ===
St. Paul's
Party	Candidate	Votes	%	±%
Labour	V. A. Darley*	1,403	60.1	+12.0
Conservative	E. A. Parker	931	39.9	−12.0
Majority		472	20.2	
Turnout		2,334		
Labour hold		Swing		

=== St. Thomas' ===
St. Thomas' (3 vacancies)
Party	Candidate	Votes	%	±%
Labour	H. Macfarlane	1,407	57.8	+5.8
Labour	B. Davis	1,388	57.0	+5.0
Labour	R. Sharp*	1,260	51.7	−0.3
Conservative	V. Georgeson*	835	34.3	−13.7
Conservative	W. Soar	718	29.5	−18.5
Liberal	W. H. Shaw	409	16.8	N/A
Liberal	T. Potter	203	8.3	N/A
Majority		425	17.5	+13.5
Turnout		2,435		
Labour hold		Swing		
Labour hold		Swing		
Labour gain from Conservative		Swing		

=== Seedley ===
Seedley (2 vacancies)
Party	Candidate	Votes	%	±%
Independent	C. J. Townsend*	1,736	50.8	N/A
Labour	E. Barton	1,719	50.3	N/A
Conservative	A. Pendlebury*	1,707	49.9	N/A
Labour	A. Linney	1,672	48.9	N/A
Majority		12	0.4	N/A
Turnout		3,418		
Independent hold		Swing		
Labour gain from Conservative		Swing		

=== Trinity ===
Trinity (3 vacancies)
Party	Candidate	Votes	%	±%
Labour	J. Davis	1,250	55.9	+2.9
Labour	J. Shlosberg*	1,210	54.1	+1.1
Labour	W. J. Emery*	1,172	52.4	−0.6
Conservative	M. E. Butler	1,092	48.8	+1.8
Conservative	J. Clancy	1,003	44.8	−2.2
Conservative	J. A. Chaloner*	986	44.1	−2.9
Majority		80	3.6	−2.4
Turnout		2,238		
Labour hold		Swing		
Labour hold		Swing		
Labour gain from Conservative		Swing		

=== Weaste ===
Weaste (2 vacancies)
Party	Candidate	Votes	%	±%
Conservative	G. H. Fearnley	1,647	50.9	−17.2
Labour	H. Glencross	1,627	50.2	+18.3
Conservative	A. Eccles	1,618	49.9	−18.2
Labour	F. M. E. Roberts*	1,583	48.9	+17.0
Majority		9	0.3	
Turnout		3,238		
Conservative hold		Swing		
Labour hold		Swing		
