= 1946 Salford City Council election =

Local election in Salford

- 1 November 1946

16 of 64 seats on Salford City Council 33 seats needed for a majority
	First party	Second party	Third party
Party	Labour	Conservative	Liberal
Last election	23 seats, 59.0%	3 seats, 35.9%	0 seats, 3.0%
Seats before	38	23	2
Seats won	10	6	0
Seats after	42	19	2
Seat change	▲4	▼4	Steady
Popular vote	26,437	23,099	3,190
Percentage	49.9%	43.7%	6.0%
Swing	▼9.1%	▲7.8%	▲3.0%
	Fourth party
Party	Independent
Last election	1 seats, 2.1%
Seats before	1
Seats won	0
Seats after	1
Seat change	Steady
Popular vote	35
Percentage	0.1%
Swing	▼2.0%
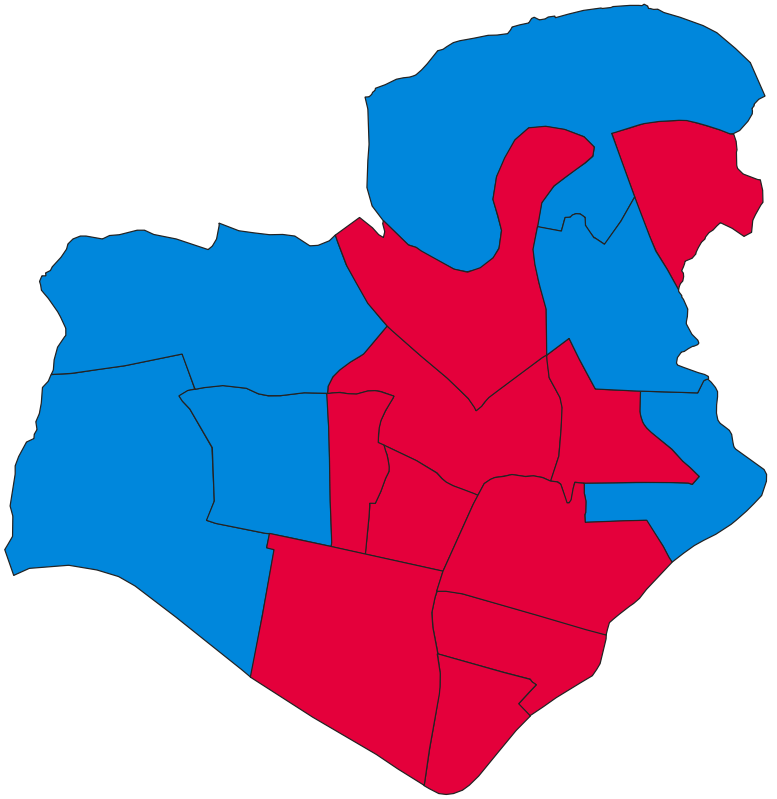
- Map of results of 1946 election
Leader of the Council before election
Labour
Leader of the Council after election
Labour

Elections to Salford City Council were held on Friday, 1 November 1946. One-third of the councillors seats were up for election, with each successful candidate to serve a three-year term of office. The Labour Party retained overall control of the council.

== Election result ==
Party	Votes		Seats			Full Council	
Labour Party	26,437 (49.9%)	▼9.1	10 (62.5%)	10 / 16	▲4	42 (65.6%)	42 / 64
Conservative Party	23,099 (43.7%)	▲7.8	6 (37.5%)	6 / 16	▼4	19 (29.7%)	19 / 64
Liberal Party	3,190 (6.0%)	▲3.0	0 (0.0%)	0 / 16	Steady	2 (3.1%)	2 / 64
Independent	35 (0.1%)	▼2.0	0 (0.0%)	0 / 16	Steady	1 (1.6%)	1 / 64
Communist	175 (0.3%)	N/A	0 (0.0%)	0 / 16	N/A	0 (0.0%)	0 / 64

=== Full council ===
↓
42	2	1	19

=== Aldermen ===
↓
9	1	6

=== Councillors ===
↓
33	1	1	13

== Ward results ==
=== Albert Park ===
Albert Park
Party	Candidate	Votes	%	±%
Conservative	T. Clarke*	2,247	52.8	+9.2
Labour	S. W. Davies	2,009	47.2	−10.9
Majority		238	5.6	
Turnout		4,256		
Conservative hold		Swing		

=== Charlestown ===
Charlestown
Party	Candidate	Votes	%	±%
Labour	J. Hardman	2,134	60.4	−11.8
Conservative	W. Soar	1,226	34.7	+4.2
Communist	E. Grundy	175	4.9	N/A
Majority		908	25.7	−13.7
Turnout		3,535		
Labour hold		Swing		

=== Claremont ===
Claremont
Party	Candidate	Votes	%	±%
Conservative	A. F. Carroll*	2,445	44.0	+1.0
Labour	T. O. Jones	1,687	30.4	−6.7
Liberal	J. M. Ford	1,419	25.6	+4.8
Majority		758	13.6	+8.6
Turnout		5,551		
Conservative hold		Swing		

=== Crescent ===
Crescent
Party	Candidate	Votes	%	±%
Labour	S. C. Hamburger	1,243	51.9	−6.6
Conservative	J. W. Fieldsend*	1,151	48.1	+5.2
Majority		92	3.8	−9.0
Turnout		2,394		
Labour gain from Conservative		Swing		

=== Docks ===
Docks
Party	Candidate	Votes	%	±%
Labour	B. Burchill	1,777	58.7	−5.7
Conservative	D. Harrison	1,252	41.3	+5.7
Majority		525	17.4	−11.4
Turnout		3,029		
Labour gain from Conservative		Swing		

=== Kersal ===
Kersal
Party	Candidate	Votes	%	±%
Conservative	H. Cobden Turner*	2,129	58.3	+15.5
Labour	H. Cahm	1,521	41.7	+2.8
Majority		608	16.6	+12.7
Turnout		3,650		
Conservative hold		Swing		

=== Langworthy ===
Langworthy
Party	Candidate	Votes	%	±%
Labour	F. M. Marron	1,655	51.2	−8.4
Conservative	C. R. V. Haynes*	1,578	48.8	+8.2
Majority		77	2.4	−14.0
Turnout		3,233		
Labour gain from Conservative		Swing		

=== Mandley Park ===
Mandley Park
Party	Candidate	Votes	%	±%
Labour	E. M. Cooper	2,043	55.4	−5.8
Conservative	C. Brookes	1,646	44.6	+5.8
Majority		397	10.8	−11.6
Turnout		3,689		
Labour gain from Conservative		Swing		

=== Ordsall Park ===
Ordsall Park
Party	Candidate	Votes	%	±%
Labour	G. H. Goulden*	2,099	64.1	−5.3
Conservative	B. A. Fox	1,176	35.9	+3.5
Majority		923	28.2	−6.3
Turnout		3,275		
Labour hold		Swing		

=== Regent ===
Regent
Party	Candidate	Votes	%	±%
Labour	E. Moreton	1,908	54.8	−8.5
Conservative	R. Williams*	1,318	37.9	+1.2
Liberal	A. Huddart	254	7.3	N/A
Majority		590	16.9	−9.7
Turnout		3,480		
Labour gain from Conservative		Swing		

=== St. Matthias' ===
St. Matthias'
Party	Candidate	Votes	%	±%
Labour	C. Bramall	1,404	47.1	−12.3
Conservative	W. S. Lappin	1,380	46.3	+5.7
Liberal	J. Wright	198	6.6	N/A
Majority		24	0.8	−18.0
Turnout		2,982		
Labour hold		Swing		

=== St. Paul's ===
St. Paul's
Party	Candidate	Votes	%	±%
Labour	J. H. Lester*	1,404	68.3	+8.2
Liberal	H. L. Davenport	651	31.7	N/A
Majority		753	36.6	+16.4
Turnout		2,055		
Labour hold		Swing		

=== St. Thomas' ===
St. Thomas'
Party	Candidate	Votes	%	±%
Labour	R. Sharp*	1,218	53.1	−4.7
Conservative	E. A. Parker	746	32.5	−1.8
Liberal	W. H. Shaw	296	12.9	−3.9
Independent	J. W. Kay	35	1.5	N/A
Majority		472	20.6	+3.1
Turnout		2,295		
Labour hold		Swing		

=== Seedley ===
Seedley
Party	Candidate	Votes	%	±%
Conservative	E. W. Bell*	1,874	51.4	+1.5
Labour	A. E. Roberts	1,775	48.6	−1.7
Majority		99	2.8	
Turnout		3,649		
Conservative hold		Swing		

=== Trinity ===
Trinity
Party	Candidate	Votes	%	±%
Conservative	M. E. Butler	1,265	55.6	+6.8
Labour	W. J. Emery*	1,010	44.4	−11.5
Majority		255	11.2	
Turnout		2,275		
Conservative gain from Labour		Swing		

=== Weaste ===
Weaste
Party	Candidate	Votes	%	±%
Conservative	A. G. Wild*	1,666	46.4	−4.5
Labour	N. Openshaw	1,550	43.2	−7.0
Liberal	J. Crompton	372	10.4	N/A
Majority		116	3.2	
Turnout		3,588		
Conservative hold		Swing		
