= 1971 Salford City Council election =

Local election in Salford

- 13 May 1971

17 of 64 seats on Salford City Council 33 seats needed for a majority
	First party	Second party	Third party
Party	Conservative	Labour	Liberal
Last election	5 seats, 45.4%	10 seats, 47.2%	1 seat, 7.4%
Seats before	44	16	3
Seats won	1	16	0
Seats after	31	29	3
Seat change	▼13	▲13	Steady
Popular vote	11,735	23,313	979
Percentage	32.6%	64.7%	2.7%
Swing	▼12.8%	▲17.5%	▼4.7%
	Fourth party
Party	Independent Labour
Last election	did not contest
Seats before	1
Seats won	0
Seats after	1
Seat change	Steady
Popular vote	0
Percentage	0.0%
Swing	N/A
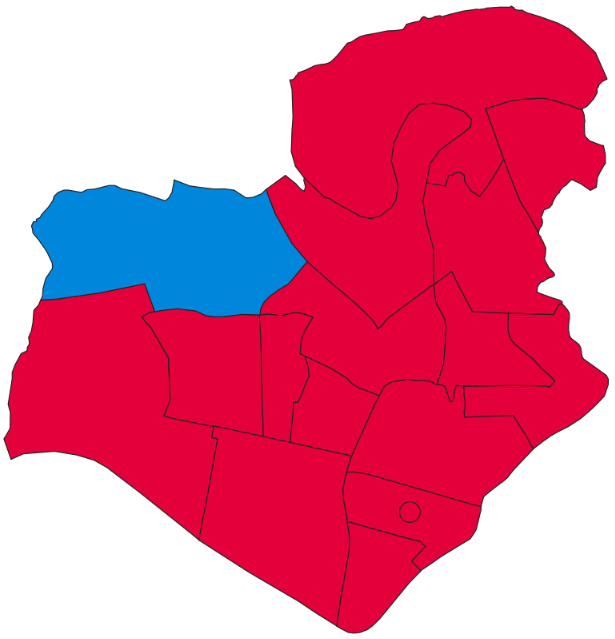
- Map of results of 1971 election
Leader of the Council before election
Conservative
Leader of the Council after election
No overall control

Elections to Salford City Council were held on Thursday, 13 May 1971. One-third of the councillors seats were up for election, with each successful candidate to serve a three-year term of office. The Conservative Party lost overall control of the council.

== Election result ==
Party	Votes		Seats			Full Council	
Conservative Party	11,735 (32.6%)	▼12.8	1 (5.9%)	1 / 17	▼13	31 (48.4%)	31 / 64
Labour Party	23,313 (64.7%)	▲17.5	16 (94.1%)	16 / 17	▲13	29 (45.3%)	29 / 64
Liberal Party	979 (2.7%)	▼4.7	0 (0.0%)	0 / 17	Steady	3 (4.7%)	3 / 64
Independent Labour	0 (0.0%)	N/A	0 (0.0%)	0 / 17	Steady	1 (1.6%)	1 / 64

=== Full council ===
↓
29	1	3	31

=== Aldermen ===
↓
1	15

=== Councillors ===
↓
29	3	16

== Ward results ==
=== Albert Park ===
Albert Park
Party	Candidate	Votes	%	±%
Labour	H. McFarlane	2,065	68.7	+7.4
Conservative	A. Bowie*	943	31.3	−7.4
Majority		1,122	37.4	+14.8
Turnout		3,008		
Labour gain from Conservative		Swing		

=== Charlestown ===
Charlestown
Party	Candidate	Votes	%	±%
Labour	T. Warrington	1,151	63.4	+16.4
Conservative	R. Allport	349	19.2	−6.1
Liberal	A. J. Trainor	315	17.4	−10.3
Majority		802	44.2	+24.9
Turnout		1,815		
Labour hold		Swing		

=== Claremont ===
Claremont
Party	Candidate	Votes	%	±%
Conservative	M. Hopkins*	1,862	56.7	−13.7
Labour	F. Taylor	1,423	43.3	+13.7
Majority		439	13.4	−27.4
Turnout		3,285		
Conservative hold		Swing		

=== Crescent ===
Crescent
Party	Candidate	Votes	%	±%
Labour	B. Wallsworth	579	52.4	+19.9
Liberal	S. Harris	408	37.0	−14.9
Conservative	W. W. Buckley*	117	10.6	−5.0
Majority		171	15.4	
Turnout		1,104		
Labour gain from Conservative		Swing		

=== Docks ===
Docks
Party	Candidate	Votes	%	±%
Labour	M. Briggs	1,560	71.0	+14.9
Conservative	B. J. Hopkins	636	29.0	−14.9
Majority		924	42.0	+29.8
Turnout		2,196		
Labour gain from Conservative		Swing		

=== Kersal ===
Kersal
Party	Candidate	Votes	%	±%
Labour	M. Jackson	1,832	56.3	+29.9
Conservative	A. Sacks	1,424	43.7	−7.5
Majority		408	12.6	
Turnout		3,256		
Labour gain from Conservative		Swing		

=== Langworthy ===
Langworthy
Party	Candidate	Votes	%	±%
Labour	B. L. Grimshaw	1,151	70.7	+15.4
Conservative	E. Richmond	476	29.3	−15.4
Majority		675	41.4	+30.8
Turnout		1,627		
Labour gain from Conservative		Swing		

=== Mandley Park ===
Mandley Park
Party	Candidate	Votes	%	±%
Labour	L. Mallinson	2,098	63.4	+14.2
Conservative	J. E. Bedell*	1,210	36.6	−14.2
Majority		888	26.8	
Turnout		3,308		
Labour gain from Conservative		Swing		

=== Ordsall Park ===
Ordsall Park
Party	Candidate	Votes	%	±%
Labour	K. Murray	1,047	72.7	+13.4
Conservative	P. Pessagno*	218	15.1	−16.6
Liberal	E. Montague	175	12.2	+3.2
Majority		829	57.6	+30.0
Turnout		1,440		
Labour gain from Conservative		Swing		

=== Regent ===
Regent (2 vacancies)
Party	Candidate	Votes	%	±%
Labour	J. Murphy	1,223	77.5	+26.8
Labour	J. R. Jaffe	1,194	75.7	+25.0
Conservative	L. B. Scott*	384	24.3	+1.5
Conservative	F. T. Holt	353	22.4	−0.4
Majority		810	51.4	+27.2
Turnout		1,578		
Labour gain from Conservative		Swing		
Labour hold		Swing		

=== St. Matthias' ===
St. Matthias'
Party	Candidate	Votes	%	±%
Labour	J. G. Williams	1,074	67.1	+13.4
Conservative	D. Peers	445	27.8	−18.5
Liberal	M. R. Bond	81	5.1	N/A
Majority		629	39.3	+31.9
Turnout		1,600		
Labour gain from Conservative		Swing		

=== St. Paul's ===
St. Paul's
Party	Candidate	Votes	%	±%
Labour	E. D. G. Robinson	1,532	79.5	+17.0
Conservative	E. Johnson	395	20.5	−17.9
Majority		1,137	59.0	+35.8
Turnout		1,927		
Labour gain from Conservative		Swing		

=== St. Thomas' ===
St. Thomas'
Party	Candidate	Votes	%	±%
Labour	W. Kelly	969	68.9	+9.2
Conservative	S. Cooper*	438	31.1	−9.2
Majority		531	37.8	+18.4
Turnout		1,407		
Labour gain from Conservative		Swing		

=== Seedley ===
Seedley
Party	Candidate	Votes	%	±%
Labour	M. Stewart	1,496	59.0	+16.5
Conservative	W. Eddes*	1,039	41.0	−16.5
Majority		457	18.0	
Turnout		2,535		
Labour gain from Conservative		Swing		

=== Trinity ===
Trinity
Party	Candidate	Votes	%	±%
Labour	G. F. Newton	736	68.8	+15.0
Conservative	J. H. Winder	333	31.2	−15.0
Majority		403	37.6	+30.0
Turnout		1,069		
Labour gain from Conservative		Swing		

=== Weaste ===
Weaste
Party	Candidate	Votes	%	±%
Labour	N. Openshaw*	2,183	66.2	+19.9
Conservative	M. Wells	1,113	33.8	−19.9
Majority		1,070	32.4	
Turnout		3,296		
Labour hold		Swing		
