= 1938 Salford City Council election =

Local election in Salford

- 1 November 1938

16 of 64 seats on Salford City Council 33 seats needed for a majority
	First party	Second party	Third party
Party	Labour	Conservative	Independent
Last election	5 seats, 43.2%	9 seats, 43.8%	2 seats, 9.8%
Seats before	29	27	7
Seats won	7	7	1
Seats after	29	27	6
Seat change	Steady	Steady	▼1
Popular vote	18,671	21,516	0
Percentage	44.3%	51.1%	0.0%
Swing	▲1.1%	▲7.3%	▼9.8%
	Fourth party
Party	Liberal
Last election	0 seats, 3.0%
Seats before	1
Seats won	1
Seats after	2
Seat change	▲1
Popular vote	1,930
Percentage	4.6%
Swing	▲1.6%
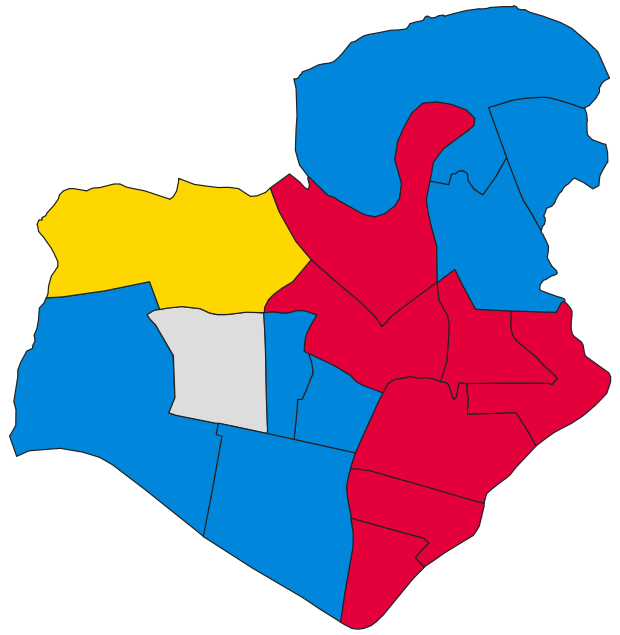
- Map of results of 1938 election
Leader of the Council before election
No overall control
Leader of the Council after election
No overall control

Elections to Salford City Council were held on Tuesday, 1 November 1938. One-third of the councillors seats were up for election, with each successful candidate to serve a three-year term of office.

Annual local elections were suspended from 1939 to 1945. Under the Local Elections and Register of Electors (Temporary Provisions) Act 1939 the term of office of all members of the council was extended by one year and casual vacancies among members of the council were filled by the choice of the council rather than by election. Local Elections and Register of Electors Acts of 1940, 1941, 1942, 1943, and 1944 each further extended the term of office of all members of the council by a year.

The council remained under no overall control.

== Election result ==
Party	Votes		Seats			Full Council	
Labour Party	18,671 (44.3%)	▲1.1	7 (43.8%)	7 / 16	Steady	29 (45.3%)	29 / 64
Conservative Party	21,516 (51.1%)	▲7.3	7 (43.8%)	7 / 16	Steady	27 (42.2%)	27 / 64
Independent	0 (0.0%)	▼9.8	1 (6.3%)	1 / 16	▼1	6 (9.4%)	6 / 64
Liberal Party	1,930 (4.6%)	▲1.6	1 (6.3%)	1 / 16	▲1	2 (3.1%)	2 / 64

=== Full council ===
↓
29	2	6	27

=== Aldermen ===
↓
9	1	3	3

=== Councillors ===
↓
20	1	3	24

== Ward results ==
=== Albert Park ===
Albert Park
Party	Candidate	Votes	%	±%
Conservative	T. Clarke*	1,432	61.5	−1.0
Labour	W. McLoughlin	895	38.5	+1.0
Majority		537	23.0	−2.0
Turnout		2,327		
Conservative hold		Swing		

=== Charlestown ===
Charlestown
Party	Candidate	Votes	%	±%
Labour	S. W. Davis*	1,916	58.1	+5.1
Conservative	W. Soar	1,381	41.9	N/A
Majority		535	16.2	+7.4
Turnout		3,297		
Labour hold		Swing		

=== Claremont ===
Claremont
Party	Candidate	Votes	%	±%
Liberal	R. Pugh	1,930	54.2	+16.2
Conservative	T. Worrall	1,628	45.8	+1.8
Majority		302	8.4	
Turnout		3,558		
Liberal gain from Independent		Swing		

=== Crescent ===
Crescent
Party	Candidate	Votes	%	±%
Labour	Ald. J. F. Crane	1,511	53.2	+14.3
Conservative	W. G. Faulkner*	1,327	46.8	−14.3
Majority		184	6.4	
Turnout		2,838		
Labour gain from Conservative		Swing		

=== Docks ===
Docks
Party	Candidate	Votes	%	±%
Conservative	H. Johnson*	1,603	57.9	+1.7
Labour	H. Ingle	1,166	42.1	−1.7
Majority		437	15.8	+3.4
Turnout		2,769		
Conservative hold		Swing		

=== Kersal ===
Kersal
Party	Candidate	Votes	%	±%
Conservative	T. Mellor*	1,400	63.4	−9.6
Labour	E. A. Wilkinson	807	36.6	+9.6
Majority		593	26.8	−19.2
Turnout		2,207		
Conservative hold		Swing		

=== Langworthy ===
Langworthy
Party	Candidate	Votes	%	±%
Conservative	C. R. V. Haynes*	1,759	51.7	+2.9
Labour	F. Lee	1,642	48.3	−2.9
Majority		117	3.4	
Turnout		3,401		
Conservative hold		Swing		

=== Mandley Park ===
Mandley Park
Party	Candidate	Votes	%	±%
Conservative	J. Whiteley*	1,586	52.5	+0.5
Labour	T. C. Loftus	1,435	47.5	−0.5
Majority		151	5.0	+1.0
Turnout		3,021		
Conservative hold		Swing		

=== Ordsall Park ===
Ordsall Park
Party	Candidate	Votes	%	±%
Labour	T. James*	1,603	52.6	−0.3
Conservative	A. Eccleshall	1,443	47.4	+0.3
Majority		160	5.2	−0.6
Turnout		3,046		
Labour hold		Swing		

=== Regent ===
Regent
Party	Candidate	Votes	%	±%
Labour	A. Millwood*	1,795	52.3	+3.6
Conservative	J. E. Gearey	1,635	47.7	−3.6
Majority		160	4.6	
Turnout		3,430		
Labour hold		Swing		

=== St. Matthias' ===
St. Matthias'
Party	Candidate	Votes	%	±%
Labour	R. Headon*	1,564	54.6	+0.1
Conservative	J. Clancy	1,301	45.4	−0.1
Majority		263	9.2	+0.2
Turnout		2,865		
Labour hold		Swing		

=== St. Paul's ===
St. Paul's
Party	Candidate	Votes	%	±%
Conservative	B. H. Rainbird	1,292	51.9	+4.9
Labour	M. C. Whitehead	1,196	48.1	−4.9
Majority		96	3.8	
Turnout		2,488		
Conservative gain from Labour		Swing		

=== St. Thomas' ===
St. Thomas'
Party	Candidate	Votes	%	±%
Labour	D. F. Higgins	1,203	52.0	+2.2
Conservative	J. F. Norbury	1,110	48.0	−2.2
Majority		93	4.0	
Turnout		2,313		
Labour hold		Swing		

=== Seedley ===
Seedley
Party	Candidate	Votes	%	±%
Independent	W. F. Cuttiford*	uncontested		
Independent hold		Swing		

=== Trinity ===
Trinity
Party	Candidate	Votes	%	±%
Labour	J. T. Tattersall*	1,218	53.0	+16.9
Conservative	J. A. Chaloner	1,081	47.0	N/A
Majority		137	6.0	
Turnout		2,299		
Labour hold		Swing		

=== Weaste ===
Weaste
Party	Candidate	Votes	%	±%
Conservative	A. G. Wild*	1,538	68.1	+5.0
Labour	N. Barrow	720	31.9	−5.0
Majority		818	36.2	+10.0
Turnout		2,258		
Conservative hold		Swing		
