= 1964 Salford City Council election =

Local election in Salford

- 7 May 1964

16 of 64 seats on Salford City Council 33 seats needed for a majority
	First party	Second party	Third party
Party	Labour	Conservative	Liberal
Last election	11 seats, 54.4%	4 seats, 34.8%	1 seat, 9.2%
Seats before	51	10	3
Seats won	11	4	1
Seats after	52	9	3
Seat change	▲1	▼1	Steady
Popular vote	17,984	13,455	1,518
Percentage	53.8%	40.2%	4.5%
Swing	▼0.6%	▲5.4%	▼4.7%
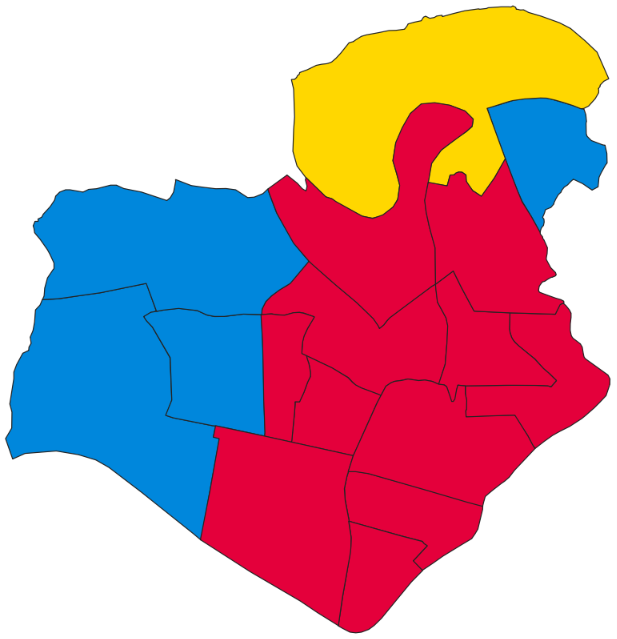
- Map of results of 1964 election
Leader of the Council before election
Labour
Leader of the Council after election
Labour

Elections to Salford City Council were held on Thursday, 7 May 1964. One-third of the councillors seats were up for election, with each successful candidate to serve a three-year term of office. The Labour Party retained overall control of the council.

== Election result ==
Party	Votes		Seats			Full Council	
Labour Party	17,984 (53.8%)	▼0.6	11 (68.8%)	11 / 16	▲1	52 (81.3%)	52 / 64
Conservative Party	13,455 (40.2%)	▲5.4	4 (25.0%)	4 / 16	▼1	9 (14.1%)	9 / 64
Liberal Party	1,518 (4.5%)	▼4.7	1 (6.3%)	1 / 16	Steady	3 (4.7%)	3 / 64
Communist	475 (1.4%)	▼0.2	0 (0.0%)	0 / 16	Steady	0 (0.0%)	0 / 64

=== Full council ===
↓
52	3	9

=== Aldermen ===
↓
16

=== Councillors ===
↓
36	3	9

== Ward results ==
=== Albert Park ===
Albert Park
Party	Candidate	Votes	%	±%
Labour	D. Bibby*	1,543	67.5	+11.0
Conservative	A. Boardman	743	32.5	+12.5
Majority		800	35.0	+2.0
Turnout		2,286		
Labour hold		Swing		

=== Charlestown ===
Charlestown
Party	Candidate	Votes	%	±%
Labour	R. Marsden*	1,238	59.1	−12.6
Conservative	B. Nolan	749	35.7	+10.5
Communist	J. Billington	109	5.2	+2.1
Majority		489	23.4	−23.1
Turnout		2,096		
Labour hold		Swing		

=== Claremont ===
Claremont
Party	Candidate	Votes	%	±%
Conservative	A. E. Clark*	2,521	66.3	+4.1
Labour	V. Pollitt	1,279	33.7	−4.1
Majority		1,242	32.6	+8.2
Turnout		3,800		
Conservative hold		Swing		

=== Crescent ===
Crescent
Party	Candidate	Votes	%	±%
Labour	R. Wiggins*	448	70.2	−3.5
Conservative	R. Jennings	190	29.8	+3.5
Majority		258	40.4	−7.0
Turnout		638		
Labour hold		Swing		

=== Docks ===
Docks
Party	Candidate	Votes	%	±%
Labour	M. Stewart*	984	62.2	−10.1
Conservative	B. Hamblet	512	32.3	+9.6
Communist	T. Keenan	87	5.5	+0.5
Majority		472	29.9	−19.9
Turnout		1,583		
Labour hold		Swing		

=== Kersal ===
Kersal
Party	Candidate	Votes	%	±%
Liberal	D. Leonard	1,518	41.3	−6.3
Labour	W. Brown	1,220	33.2	+0.5
Conservative	C. D. M. Hamilton	939	25.5	+5.8
Majority		298	8.1	−6.8
Turnout		3,677		
Liberal hold		Swing		

=== Langworthy ===
Langworthy
Party	Candidate	Votes	%	±%
Labour	N. Openshaw*	1,248	65.8	−22.5
Conservative	M. Heyworth	594	31.3	N/A
Communist	J. J. Farr	56	2.9	−8.8
Majority		654	34.5	−42.1
Turnout		1,898		
Labour hold		Swing		

=== Mandley Park ===
Mandley Park
Party	Candidate	Votes	%	±%
Conservative	J. H. Franks*	1,835	53.2	+13.4
Labour	V. Fairbrother	1,616	46.8	−1.5
Majority		219	6.4	
Turnout		3,451		
Conservative hold		Swing		

=== Ordsall Park ===
Ordsall Park
Party	Candidate	Votes	%	±%
Labour	W. Neafsey*	1,264	78.9	+7.1
Conservative	A. Sacks	218	13.6	−9.7
Communist	A. Moore	121	7.5	+2.6
Majority		1,046	65.3	+16.8
Turnout		1,603		
Labour hold		Swing		

=== Regent ===
Regent
Party	Candidate	Votes	%	±%
Labour	J. Mackenzie*	1,108	72.2	+1.2
Conservative	J. Bradbury	325	21.2	−1.6
Communist	K. Harvey	102	6.6	+0.4
Majority		783	51.0	+2.8
Turnout		1,535		
Labour hold		Swing		

=== St. Matthias' ===
St. Matthias'
Party	Candidate	Votes	%	±%
Labour	J. J. Ferris*	1,217	69.1	+10.8
Conservative	J. Doyle	545	30.9	+3.4
Majority		672	38.2	+7.4
Turnout		1,762		
Labour hold		Swing		

=== St. Paul's ===
St. Paul's
Party	Candidate	Votes	%	±%
Labour	P. Grimshaw*	848	64.5	−6.4
Conservative	R. Whitworth	466	35.5	+6.4
Majority		382	29.0	−12.8
Turnout		1,314		
Labour hold		Swing		

=== St. Thomas' ===
St. Thomas'
Party	Candidate	Votes	%	±%
Labour	J. Goldberg*	476	65.1	−3.7
Conservative	W. H. Parker	255	34.9	+3.7
Majority		221	30.2	−7.4
Turnout		731		
Labour hold		Swing		

=== Seedley ===
Seedley
Party	Candidate	Votes	%	±%
Conservative	H. Mellor*	1,407	51.7	−2.2
Labour	J. Hincks	1,316	48.3	+2.2
Majority		91	3.4	−4.4
Turnout		2,723		
Conservative hold		Swing		

=== Trinity ===
Trinity
Party	Candidate	Votes	%	±%
Labour	A. Adams	600	57.4	+7.6
Conservative	B. Baxter	446	42.6	−7.6
Majority		154	14.8	
Turnout		1,046		
Labour gain from Conservative		Swing		

=== Weaste ===
Weaste
Party	Candidate	Votes	%	±%
Conservative	P. Ashcroft	1,710	52.0	+0.1
Labour	R. Dodd	1,579	48.0	+2.6
Majority		131	4.0	−2.5
Turnout		3,289		
Conservative hold		Swing		
