= 1959 Salford City Council election =

Local election in Salford

- 7 May 1959

16 of 64 seats on Salford City Council 33 seats needed for a majority
	First party	Second party
Party	Labour	Conservative
Last election	13 seats, 57.9%	3 seats, 37.8%
Seats before	56	8
Seats won	13	3
Seats after	56	8
Seat change	Steady	Steady
Popular vote	22,759	17,275
Percentage	54.3%	41.2%
Swing	▼3.6%	▲3.4%
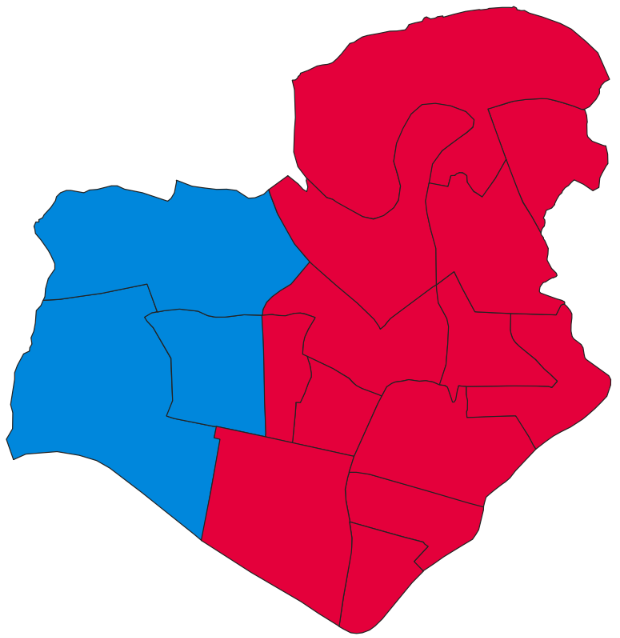
- Map of results of 1959 election
Leader of the Council before election
Labour
Leader of the Council after election
Labour

Elections to Salford City Council were held on Thursday, 7 May 1959. One-third of the councillors seats were up for election, with each successful candidate to serve a three-year term of office. The Labour Party retained overall control of the council.

== Election result ==
Party	Votes		Seats			Full Council	
Labour Party	22,759 (54.3%)	▼3.6	13 (81.3%)	13 / 16	Steady	56 (87.5%)	56 / 64
Conservative Party	17,275 (41.2%)	▲3.4	3 (18.7%)	3 / 16	Steady	8 (12.5%)	8 / 64
Liberal Party	1,587 (3.8%)	▲0.2	0 (0.0%)	0 / 16	Steady	0 (0.0%)	0 / 64
Communist	227 (0.5%)	▼0.2	0 (0.0%)	0 / 16	Steady	0 (0.0%)	0 / 64
Independent	38 (0.1%)	N/A	0 (0.0%)	0 / 16	N/A	0 (0.0%)	0 / 64

=== Full council ===
↓
56	8

=== Aldermen ===
↓
16

=== Councillors ===
↓
40	8

== Ward results ==
=== Albert Park ===
Albert Park
Party	Candidate	Votes	%	±%
Labour	H. Hopkinson*	2,080	60.1	−4.7
Conservative	C. D. M. Hamilton	1,382	39.9	+4.7
Majority		698	20.2	−9.4
Turnout		3,462		
Labour hold		Swing		

=== Charlestown ===
Charlestown
Party	Candidate	Votes	%	±%
Labour	E. Hough	1,430	56.5	−12.4
Conservative	E. Kenyon	976	38.5	+12.6
Communist	J. Billington	127	5.0	−0.2
Majority		454	18.0	−25.0
Turnout		2,533		
Labour hold		Swing		

=== Claremont ===
Claremont
Party	Candidate	Votes	%	±%
Conservative	V. Hemingway*	2,835	70.2	+5.1
Labour	N. Silver	1,202	29.8	−5.1
Majority		1,633	40.4	+10.2
Turnout		4,037		
Conservative hold		Swing		

=== Crescent ===
Crescent
Party	Candidate	Votes	%	±%
Labour	T. W. Thelwell*	918	67.5	−5.4
Conservative	W. Hall	443	32.5	+5.4
Majority		475	35.0	−10.8
Turnout		1,361		
Labour hold		Swing		

=== Docks ===
Docks
Party	Candidate	Votes	%	±%
Labour	B. Burchill*	1,603	71.3	−4.2
Conservative	D. Stafford	645	28.7	+4.2
Majority		958	42.6	−8.4
Turnout		2,248		
Labour hold		Swing		

=== Kersal ===
Kersal
Party	Candidate	Votes	%	±%
Labour	S. C. Hamburger*	1,898	39.7	+2.2
Liberal	M. R. Marks	1,587	33.2	+1.6
Conservative	M. Launer	1,255	26.3	−4.6
Independent	M. Shloimovitz	38	0.8	N/A
Majority		311	6.5	+0.6
Turnout		4,778		
Labour hold		Swing		

=== Langworthy ===
Langworthy
Party	Candidate	Votes	%	±%
Labour	F. M. Marron*	1,249	68.4	−5.7
Conservative	M. Cooper	578	31.6	+5.7
Majority		671	36.8	−11.4
Turnout		1,827		
Labour hold		Swing		

=== Mandley Park ===
Mandley Park
Party	Candidate	Votes	%	±%
Labour	E. M. Cooper*	2,218	52.7	+4.2
Conservative	J. E. Bedell	1,989	47.3	−4.2
Majority		229	5.4	
Turnout		4,207		
Labour hold		Swing		

=== Ordsall Park ===
Ordsall Park
Party	Candidate	Votes	%	±%
Labour	B. Moylan*	1,603	76.2	−13.9
Conservative	W. H. Burke	402	19.1	N/A
Communist	J. Cohen	100	4.7	−5.2
Majority		1,201	57.1	−23.1
Turnout		2,105		
Labour hold		Swing		

=== Regent ===
Regent
Party	Candidate	Votes	%	±%
Labour	M. Jackson	1,353	69.1	−5.2
Conservative	A. Fielding	604	30.9	+5.2
Majority		749	38.2	−10.4
Turnout		1,957		
Labour hold		Swing		

=== St. Matthias' ===
St. Matthias'
Party	Candidate	Votes	%	±%
Labour	C. Bramall*	853	55.1	−17.6
Conservative	J. H. Winder	694	44.9	+17.6
Majority		159	10.2	−35.2
Turnout		1,547		
Labour hold		Swing		

=== St. Paul's ===
St. Paul's
Party	Candidate	Votes	%	±%
Labour	H. Blythe*	1,438	69.2	−2.9
Conservative	H. Bell	640	30.8	+2.9
Majority		798	38.4	−5.8
Turnout		2,078		
Labour hold		Swing		

=== St. Thomas' ===
St. Thomas'
Party	Candidate	Votes	%	±%
Labour	N. Wright*	947	68.5	−2.6
Conservative	D. M. Angel	435	31.5	+2.6
Majority		512	37.0	−5.2
Turnout		1,382		
Labour hold		Swing		

=== Seedley ===
Seedley
Party	Candidate	Votes	%	±%
Conservative	R. Stones	1,440	51.1	+7.6
Labour	N. S. Mallinson	1,378	48.9	−7.6
Majority		62	2.2	
Turnout		2,818		
Conservative hold		Swing		

=== Trinity ===
Trinity
Party	Candidate	Votes	%	±%
Labour	H. M. Ferguson*	901	53.8	+8.1
Conservative	F. L. Fenton	773	46.2	−8.1
Majority		128	7.6	
Turnout		1,674		
Labour hold		Swing		

=== Weaste ===
Weaste
Party	Candidate	Votes	%	±%
Conservative	A. G. Wild*	2,184	56.4	+7.5
Labour	A. Duggan	1,688	43.6	−7.5
Majority		496	12.8	
Turnout		3,872		
Conservative hold		Swing		
