= 1958 Salford City Council election =

Local election in Salford

- 8 May 1958

16 of 64 seats on Salford City Council 33 seats needed for a majority
	First party	Second party
Party	Labour	Conservative
Last election	14 seats, 55.3%	2 seats, 34.6%
Seats before	53	11
Seats won	13	3
Seats after	56	8
Seat change	▲3	▼3
Popular vote	22,888	14,945
Percentage	57.9%	37.8%
Swing	▲2.6%	▲3.2%
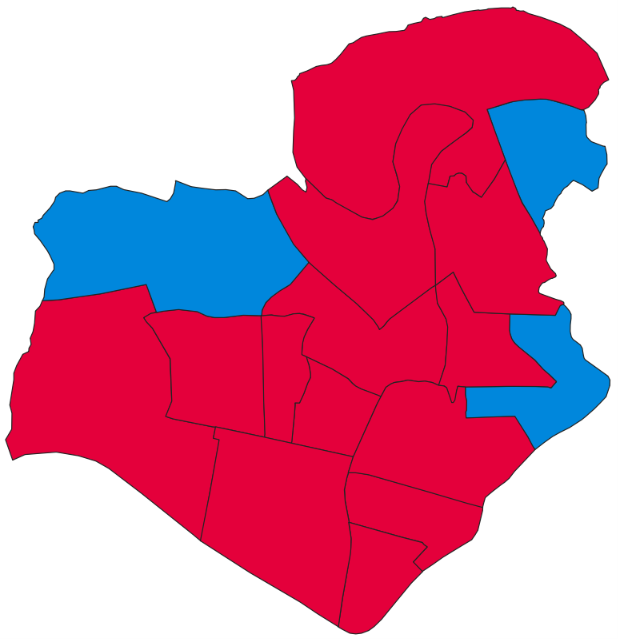
- Map of results of 1958 election
Leader of the Council before election
Labour
Leader of the Council after election
Labour

Elections to Salford City Council were held on Thursday, 8 May 1958. One-third of the councillors seats were up for election, with each successful candidate to serve a three-year term of office. The Labour Party retained overall control of the council.

== Election result ==
Party	Votes		Seats			Full Council	
Labour Party	22,888 (57.9%)	▲2.6	13 (81.3%)	13 / 16	▲3	56 (87.5%)	56 / 64
Conservative Party	14,945 (37.8%)	▲3.2	3 (18.7%)	3 / 16	▼3	8 (12.5%)	8 / 64
Liberal Party	1,428 (3.6%)	▼6.0	0 (0.0%)	0 / 16	Steady	0 (0.0%)	0 / 64
Communist	295 (0.7%)	▲0.1	0 (0.0%)	0 / 16	Steady	0 (0.0%)	0 / 64

=== Full council ===
↓
56	8

=== Aldermen ===
↓
16

=== Councillors ===
↓
40	8

== Ward results ==
=== Albert Park ===
Albert Park
Party	Candidate	Votes	%	±%
Labour	H. Alvarez*	2,210	64.8	−1.3
Conservative	J. Davies	1,203	35.2	+1.3
Majority		1,007	29.6	−2.6
Turnout		3,413		
Labour hold		Swing		

=== Charlestown ===
Charlestown
Party	Candidate	Votes	%	±%
Labour	H. Calderwood*	1,571	68.9	+5.8
Conservative	S. Cooper	590	25.9	+2.2
Communist	J. Billington	120	5.2	+0.5
Majority		981	43.0	+3.6
Turnout		2,281		
Labour hold		Swing		

=== Claremont ===
Claremont
Party	Candidate	Votes	%	±%
Conservative	A. E. Clark*	2,828	65.1	+13.3
Labour	R. Biggs	1,519	34.9	N/A
Majority		1,309	30.2	+26.6
Turnout		4,347		
Conservative hold		Swing		

=== Crescent ===
Crescent
Party	Candidate	Votes	%	±%
Labour	R. Wiggins*	949	72.9	−0.6
Conservative	W. Barber	352	27.1	+0.6
Majority		597	45.8	−1.2
Turnout		1,301		
Labour hold		Swing		

=== Docks ===
Docks
Party	Candidate	Votes	%	±%
Labour	J. Hall*	1,381	75.5	+2.6
Conservative	D. Stafford	448	24.5	N/A
Majority		933	51.0	+5.2
Turnout		1,829		
Labour hold		Swing		

=== Kersal ===
Kersal
Party	Candidate	Votes	%	±%
Labour	R. Casket	1,691	37.5	−13.7
Liberal	M. R. Marks	1,428	31.6	N/A
Conservative	M. Launer	1,396	30.9	−17.9
Majority		263	5.9	+3.5
Turnout		4,515		
Labour gain from Conservative		Swing		

=== Langworthy ===
Langworthy
Party	Candidate	Votes	%	±%
Labour	N. Openshaw*	1,358	74.1	+14.1
Conservative	M. Cooper	475	25.9	−2.4
Majority		883	48.2	+16.5
Turnout		1,833		
Labour hold		Swing		

=== Mandley Park ===
Mandley Park
Party	Candidate	Votes	%	±%
Conservative	J. H. Franks*	2,218	51.5	+9.1
Labour	T. Cunningham	2,092	48.5	−9.1
Majority		126	3.0	
Turnout		4,310		
Conservative hold		Swing		

=== Ordsall Park ===
Ordsall Park
Party	Candidate	Votes	%	±%
Labour	W. Neafsey*	1,589	90.1	−3.5
Communist	J. Cohen	175	9.9	+3.5
Majority		1,414	80.2	−7.0
Turnout		1,764		
Labour hold		Swing		

=== Regent ===
Regent
Party	Candidate	Votes	%	±%
Labour	J. Mackenzie*	1,386	74.3	+0.9
Conservative	W. Hall	480	25.7	−0.9
Majority		906	48.6	+1.8
Turnout		1,866		
Labour hold		Swing		

=== St. Matthias' ===
St. Matthias'
Party	Candidate	Votes	%	±%
Labour	B. Wilson*	986	72.7	+4.4
Conservative	F. A. Cope	371	27.3	−4.4
Majority		615	45.4	+8.8
Turnout		1,357		
Labour hold		Swing		

=== St. Paul's ===
St. Paul's
Party	Candidate	Votes	%	±%
Labour	P. Grimshaw	1,146	72.1	+2.2
Conservative	J. R. Courtney	443	27.9	+4.7
Majority		703	44.2	−2.5
Turnout		1,589		
Labour hold		Swing		

=== St. Thomas' ===
St. Thomas'
Party	Candidate	Votes	%	±%
Labour	J. Goldberg*	960	71.1	+8.5
Conservative	D. M. Angel	390	28.9	+9.2
Majority		570	42.2	−0.7
Turnout		1,350		
Labour hold		Swing		

=== Seedley ===
Seedley
Party	Candidate	Votes	%	±%
Labour	F. I. Hartley	1,552	56.5	+12.6
Conservative	N. H. Maxwell	1,196	43.5	−1.7
Majority		356	13.0	
Turnout		2,748		
Labour gain from Conservative		Swing		

=== Trinity ===
Trinity
Party	Candidate	Votes	%	±%
Conservative	D. Sheehan*	833	54.3	+7.9
Labour	G. C. Copple	702	45.7	−7.9
Majority		131	8.6	
Turnout		1,535		
Conservative hold		Swing		

=== Weaste ===
Weaste
Party	Candidate	Votes	%	±%
Labour	G. Warburton	1,796	51.1	+5.5
Conservative	J. Tilby	1,722	48.9	+4.9
Majority		74	2.2	+0.6
Turnout		3,518		
Labour gain from Conservative		Swing		
