= 1956 Salford City Council election =

Local election in Salford

- 10 May 1956

16 of 64 seats on Salford City Council 33 seats needed for a majority
	First party	Second party
Party	Labour	Conservative
Last election	11 seats, 50.7%	5 seats, 48.3%
Seats before	52	12
Seats won	13	3
Seats after	52	12
Seat change	Steady	Steady
Popular vote	22,670	15,870
Percentage	57.3%	40.1%
Swing	▲6.6%	▼8.2%
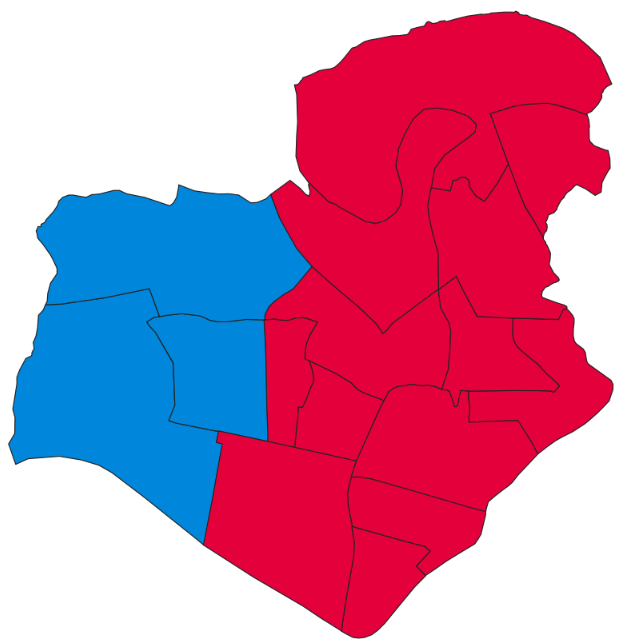
- Map of results of 1956 election
Leader of the Council before election
Labour
Leader of the Council after election
Labour

Elections to Salford City Council were held on Thursday, 10 May 1956. One-third of the councillors seats were up for election, with each successful candidate to serve a three-year term of office. The Labour Party retained overall control of the council.

== Election result ==
Party	Votes		Seats			Full Council	
Labour Party	22,670 (57.3%)	▲6.6	13 (81.3%)	13 / 16	Steady	52 (81.3%)	52 / 64
Conservative Party	15,870 (40.1%)	▼8.2	3 (18.7%)	3 / 16	Steady	12 (18.7%)	12 / 64
Liberal Party	793 (2.0%)	▲1.5	0 (0.0%)	0 / 16	Steady	0 (0.0%)	0 / 64
Communist	259 (0.7%)	▲0.2	0 (0.0%)	0 / 16	Steady	0 (0.0%)	0 / 64

=== Full council ===
↓
52	12

=== Aldermen ===
↓
16

=== Councillors ===
↓
36	12

== Ward results ==
=== Albert Park ===
Albert Park
Party	Candidate	Votes	%	±%
Labour	H. Hopkinson	2,219	61.0	+8.0
Conservative	F. A. Cope	1,416	39.0	−8.0
Majority		803	22.0	+16.0
Turnout		3,635		
Labour hold		Swing		

=== Charlestown ===
Charlestown
Party	Candidate	Votes	%	±%
Labour	J. Hardman*	1,594	61.4	+3.4
Conservative	G. M. Joplin	888	34.2	−3.7
Communist	E. Grundy	114	4.4	+0.3
Majority		706	27.2	+7.1
Turnout		2,596		
Labour hold		Swing		

=== Claremont ===
Claremont
Party	Candidate	Votes	%	±%
Conservative	V. Hemingway	2,317	65.0	−1.5
Labour	B. Walsworth	1,250	35.0	+1.5
Majority		1,067	30.0	−3.0
Turnout		3,567		
Conservative hold		Swing		

=== Crescent ===
Crescent
Party	Candidate	Votes	%	±%
Labour	T. W. Thelwell*	1,022	65.1	+5.3
Conservative	L. O. V. Daley	548	34.9	−5.3
Majority		474	30.2	+10.6
Turnout		1,570		
Labour hold		Swing		

=== Docks ===
Docks
Party	Candidate	Votes	%	±%
Labour	B. Burchill*	1,618	67.6	+11.8
Conservative	J. Tilby	775	32.4	−11.8
Majority		843	35.2	+23.6
Turnout		2,393		
Labour hold		Swing		

=== Kersal ===
Kersal
Party	Candidate	Votes	%	±%
Labour	S. C. Hamburger*	2,547	57.0	+12.2
Conservative	T. W. Nield	1,925	43.0	−12.2
Majority		622	14.0	
Turnout		4,472		
Labour hold		Swing		

=== Langworthy ===
Langworthy
Party	Candidate	Votes	%	±%
Labour	F. M. Marron*	1,330	58.3	−0.1
Conservative	N. H. Maxwell	738	32.3	−9.3
Liberal	A. E. Lee	214	9.4	N/A
Majority		592	26.0	+9.2
Turnout		2,282		
Labour hold		Swing		

=== Mandley Park ===
Mandley Park
Party	Candidate	Votes	%	±%
Labour	E. M. Cooper*	2,169	56.9	+9.5
Conservative	R. Prince	1,640	43.1	−9.5
Majority		529	13.8	
Turnout		3,809		
Labour hold		Swing		

=== Ordsall Park ===
Ordsall Park
Party	Candidate	Votes	%	±%
Labour	B. Moylan*	1,560	91.5	+28.5
Communist	J. Cohen	145	8.5	+5.0
Majority		1,415	83.0	+53.5
Turnout		1,705		
Labour hold		Swing		

=== Regent ===
Regent
Party	Candidate	Votes	%	±%
Labour	E. Moreton*	1,415	69.5	+5.2
Conservative	V. W. Livesey	621	30.5	−5.2
Majority		794	39.0	+10.4
Turnout		2,036		
Labour hold		Swing		

=== St. Matthias' ===
St. Matthias'
Party	Candidate	Votes	%	±%
Labour	C. Bramall*	1,079	65.8	+6.7
Conservative	A. Sacks	561	34.2	−6.7
Majority		518	31.6	+13.4
Turnout		1,640		
Labour hold		Swing		

=== St. Paul's ===
St. Paul's
Party	Candidate	Votes	%	±%
Labour	H. Blythe	1,333	67.0	+7.2
Conservative	J. R. Courtney	514	25.8	−14.4
Liberal	O. M. Hill	143	7.2	N/A
Majority		819	41.2	+21.6
Turnout		1,990		
Labour hold		Swing		

=== St. Thomas' ===
St. Thomas'
Party	Candidate	Votes	%	±%
Labour	N. Wright*	uncontested		
Labour hold		Swing		

=== Seedley ===
Seedley
Party	Candidate	Votes	%	±%
Conservative	W. E. Hargreaves*	1,187	45.7	−8.2
Labour	I. Zott	974	37.5	−0.8
Liberal	J. Rigby	436	16.8	+9.0
Majority		213	8.2	−7.4
Turnout		2,597		
Conservative hold		Swing		

=== Trinity ===
Trinity
Party	Candidate	Votes	%	±%
Labour	H. M. Ferguson	929	55.0	+2.0
Conservative	J. H. Winder	761	45.0	−2.0
Majority		168	10.0	+4.0
Turnout		1,690		
Labour hold		Swing		

=== Weaste ===
Weaste
Party	Candidate	Votes	%	±%
Conservative	A. G. Wild*	1,979	54.8	−6.3
Labour	J. Goldberg	1,631	45.2	+6.3
Majority		348	9.6	−12.6
Turnout		3,610		
Conservative hold		Swing		
