= Vauxhall, Liverpool =

District of Liverpool, England

Coordinates: 53.41643°N 2.984869°W

Vauxhall
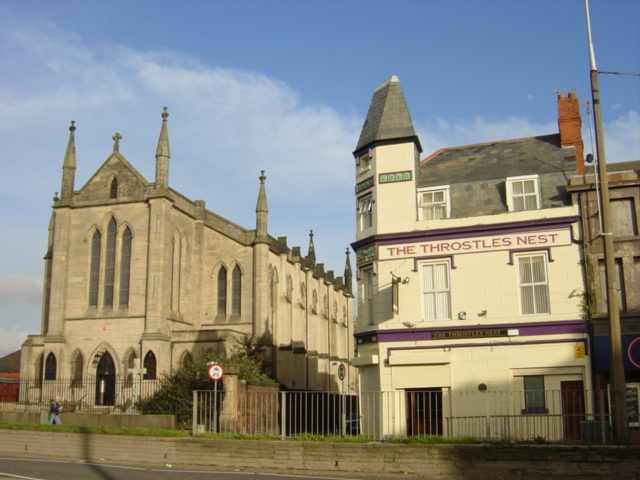
- St Anthony's Church and The Throstles Nest public house, Scotland Road

- Location within Merseyside
- Population: 6,699 (2001 Census)
- OS grid reference: SJ345915
- Metropolitan borough: Liverpool
- Metropolitan county: Merseyside
- Region: North West
- Country: England
- Sovereign state: United Kingdom
- Post town: LIVERPOOL
- Postcode district: L3, L5
- Dialling code: 0151
- Police: Merseyside
- Fire: Merseyside
- Ambulance: North West
- UK Parliament: Liverpool Riverside

Vauxhall is an inner city district of Liverpool, England, north of the city centre, bounded by Kirkdale to the north and Everton to the east, with the docks and River Mersey running along the west side.

Vauxhall is in the Liverpool City Council ward of Kirkdale and the edge of the Central, Liverpool ward, although previously it was a ward itself. In the 1841 Liverpool Census the area was covered by two wards Scotland and Vauxhall. According to the 2001 Census, Vauxhall had a population of 6,699.

== Description ==
The Vauxhall area is more famously known as the "Scottie Road area" due to the history of Scotland Road running through it. The Scottie Press is a well known local newspaper for the Vauxhall area and is recognised as "Britain's longest running community newspaper". In 2008 Liverpool celebrated being European Capital of Culture, and in June 2008 to make a point of the area's contribution to Liverpool is not forgotten amid all the cultural celebrations, the Scottie Roaders, old and new, held their own 08 party.

Despite the area being widely known and historical, the Vauxhall area is often misrepresented by the media as Kirkdale or Everton. Liverpool City Council's haste to update district signs around 2005 has also meant the entire area was formally misrepresented by signs saying "Everton", although these signs no longer remain around Vauxhall.

The south end of Vauxhall near the city centre is home to Liverpool John Moores University at Byrom Street. This location like so much of Liverpool's inner city is much changed compared to yesteryear. Also nearby is Atlantic Point and Marybone halls of residence.

== History ==
Scotland Road was created in the 1770s as a turnpike road to Preston via Walton and Burscough. It became part of a stagecoach route to Scotland, hence its name. It was partly widened in 1803 and streets of working-class housing laid out either side as Liverpool expanded. Many were demolished as slums in the 1930s, to be replaced with corporation flats. In the mid-19th century as destitute, starving Irish immigrants flooded into the area particularly during the Great Famine, Scotland Road had become densely overcrowded, this with people living in courts and cellars in appalling conditions with poverty and sickness worse than anywhere in the country. The crypt of St Anthony's Church on Scotland Road contains the remains of around 2000 men, women and children who escaped Ireland to Liverpool during the Great Famine but later died during the Cholera and Typhus epidemics of 1847.

Eldon Grove (now Grade II listed) was built as model housing as part of a labourers' village and was officially opened by the Countess of Derby in 1912.

In Victorian times the area had over 200 public houses, mostly now gone. What is now Vauxhall was historically within the boundaries of old Liverpool before further expansion took in the nearby townships of Everton (1835) and Kirkdale (1860s).

Scotland Road was the centre of working class life in north Liverpool. Home to most of Liverpool's migrant communities, Scotland Road was almost "a city within a city but by far the largest community was Irish Catholic following a massive influx of refugees fleeing the famine of 1847/48 It was a place close to both the back end of the city centre and the docks. It could be a place of both romantic nostalgia and brutal hardship. Community was at the centre of Scotland Road and a shared distinctly Liverpool -Irish identity evolved through the nineteenth and early twentieth century.

Urban clearance and the construction of the Wallasey Tunnel in the 1960s and '70s led to a shift in population of the area to various parts of the city such as Kirkby, Croxteth, Norris Green, Fazakerley, Huyton, Stockbridge Village to new modern housing, leaving Scotland Road in a state of steady decline. Demolition particularly around the north end of Scotland Road continued in the 1980s and beyond.

=== New housing ===
2008 marked 30 years since a new housing estate breathed life into derelict land to the west of Vauxhall Road called Eldonian Village. In recent years new housing has followed this flagship Eldonian Village, such as Athol Village alongside the Leeds and Liverpool Canal plus flats and student accommodation around the Leeds Street and Marybone end to improve the Vauxhall area, however little of Scotland Road itself remains.

Plans were unveiled in March 2018 to restore the three blocks of Eldon Grove back into use as housing after them being derelict for over 16 years. The plans also include the creation of a new block of flats on adjacent land.

=== Liverpool Waters ===
For the future, Peel Holdings plan for the docks in Vauxhall is called Liverpool Waters. Reported that this development would take decades to complete, elements have started in 2025 at the 'Central Docks'.

== Political history ==
The area has been contained in the following parliamentary constituencies:

- Liverpool Scotland (1885–1974)
- Liverpool Scotland Exchange (1974–83)
- Liverpool Kirkdale (1983–present)

The Members of Parliament (MPs) for the area since 1885 have been as follows:

Election	Member	Party
1885	T.P. O'Connor	Irish Nationalist
1929 by-election	David Logan	Labour
1964 by-election	Walter Alldritt	Labour
1971 by-election	Frank Marsden	Labour
Feb 1974	Robert Parry	Labour
1997	Louise Ellman	Labour Co-op
2019	Kim Johnson	Labour

The area is covered by three council wards,Vauxhall, Waterfront North and City Centre North The election results for the Vauxhall wards of Liverpool City Council can be found via:

- Liverpool City Council elections, 1880–present
- Liverpool Town Council elections, 1835–1879

== Landmarks in Vauxhall ==
Much of the area's landmarks have long since been demolished or closed. Some existing landmarks are:

- Hill Dickinson Stadium at Bramley-Moore Dock that was built for Everton F.C. who moved there in 2025.
- St Anthony's Church
- St Sylvester's Church
- Stanley Dock
- Tobacco Warehouse
- Eldon Grove, off Limekiln Lane.
- Throstles Nest (public house next to St Anthony's Church)
- Ten Streets Area designated for redevelopment between Great Howard Street and Liverpool's 'dock road'.

The North Liverpool Community Justice Centre (CJC) was based in Boundary Street in a former school.

== Education ==
There were many schools in the "Scottie Road" area, however with a decline in population, and rather like pubs and churches, few remain:

- Holy Cross & St Mary's Catholic primary school
- The Trinity Catholic primary school

== Notable residents ==
- Cilla Black
- Tom Baker
- Bobby Campbell
- Laurie Carberry
- James William Carling
- Tommy Comerford
- Nancy Flanagan
- Thomas Cecil Gray
- Jackie Hamilton
- John Hines (Australian soldier)
- David Logan
- Jimmy Melia
- Johnny Morrissey
- James Nugent
- Robert Parry (MP)
- Father Tom Williams
