= St Sylvester's Church, Vauxhall =

Church building in Liverpool, England

Coordinates: 53.421247°N 2.987677°W

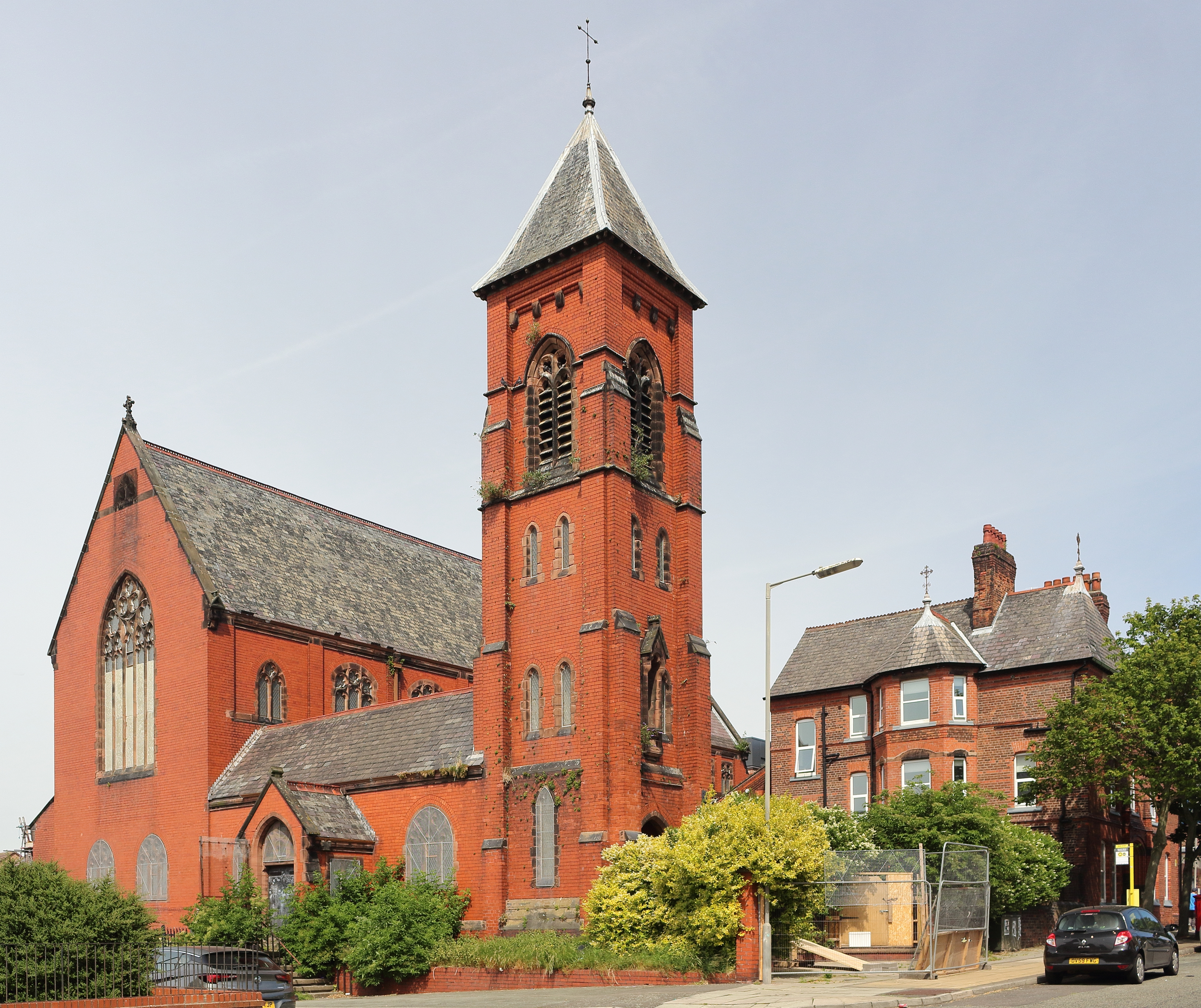
St Sylvester's church seen from the southwest

St Sylvester's Church, Vauxhall is a Roman Catholic church in Liverpool, England. It is in Silvester Street in the Vauxhall area of the city. It is no longer in use.

It is a Gothic revival church designed by Pugin & Pugin. It was built in 1888–89 using red brick from Ruabon, Wales.
