= Liverpool Riverside =

UK Parliament constituency (since 1983)

Coordinates: 53.355°N 2.947°W

- Borough constituency for the House of Commons
- Interactive map of boundaries since 2024
- Location within North West England
- County: Merseyside
- Electorate: 70,157 (March 2020)

Current constituency
- Created: 1983
- Member of Parliament: Kim Johnson (Labour)
- Seats: One
- Created from: Liverpool Toxteth, Liverpool Scotland Exchange

Liverpool Riverside is a constituency (Note: A borough constituency (for the purposes of election expenses and type of returning officer)) represented in the House of Commons of the UK Parliament since 2019 by Kim Johnson, who is a member of the Labour Party.

== Constituency profile ==
Liverpool Riverside is an urban constituency in Merseyside. It covers the centre of the city of Liverpool and the neighbourhoods of Vauxhall, Kirkdale, Everton, Anfield, Toxteth and Dingle. Liverpool is a large port city with a history of slave trading and importation of goods for Lancashire's industry. The city underwent economic decline in the 1970s as the docks and manufacturing industries declined in importance, but has experienced regeneration in the 21st century. The Liverpool Riverside constituency contains the home stadiums of Liverpool F.C. and Everton F.C., and has a large student population as the location of the University of Liverpool and Liverpool John Moores University, which together have around 57,000 students. This constituency is highly-deprived; the city centre has average levels of wealth but the surrounding neighbourhoods fall within the top 10% most-deprived areas in England. The average house price is lower than the rest of North West England and less than half the national average.

In general, residents of Liverpool Riverside are young, unmarried, well-educated and have very low rates of homeownership. Household income is low and a high proportion of residents work in accommodation, food and the public sector. The child poverty rate is more than double the UK-wide figure and a high percentage of residents claim unemployment benefits. White people made up 74% of the population at the 2021 census and Asians were the largest ethnic minority group at 9%. The constituency has large Chinese and Arab communities. At the local city council, almost all seats in the constituency are represented by the Labour Party. Voters in Liverpool Riverside strongly supported remaining in the European Union in the 2016 referendum; an estimated 63% voted to remain compared to the nationwide figure of 48%.

== History ==
Creation

Liverpool Riverside was created in 1983, merging most of the old Liverpool Scotland Exchange and Liverpool Toxteth constituencies. A provisional recommendation by the Boundary Commission was for the name Liverpool Abercromby, dropped during the local consultations, during which an alternative name of Liverpool Cathedrals was also proposed.

Results of the winning party

The area has been held by the Labour Party since the 1964 election (including predecessor seats); 1983—1997 by Robert Parry (ex-MP for Scotland Exchange, from 1974), 1997—2019 by Louise Ellman, and 2019—date by Kim Johnson. The 2017 result made the seat the 3rd safest seat by percentage of majority.

Results of other parties

The 2005 general election saw much more than the national average swing (+8.1%) to the Liberal Democrat candidate (compared with 3.4% nationwide), however Labour's candidate won more than double that share of the vote, scoring 57%. In the same election the area was one of several urban seats in which the Green Party retained its deposit by its candidate scoring just over 5% of the vote. The last time until 2017 that the Conservatives fielded a candidate who achieved second place was in 1992. That party took third place in 2015 behind the highest polling to date for any candidate from the Green Party across Merseyside. Despite the Conservatives managing to come second in the seat in 2017, this was significantly overshadowed by the fact Labour won over 84% of the vote and a majority of 35,947 (74.8%), the biggest margin by both popular vote and percentage majority the party has ever won in the seat.

Turnout

In the 2001 and 2005 general elections it had the lowest turnout of all constituencies of the UK. In a contest where positions of runner-up candidates greatly changed, turnout exceeded 62% in the 2015 election. This slightly increased to 62.9% in 2017, which remains below the average (the 2017 election had a total turnout of 68.8%), but significantly less so than has previously been the case in the constituency.

== Boundaries ==
Map of 2010–2024 boundaries

=== Historic ===
1983–1997: The City of Liverpool wards of Abercromby, Arundel, Dingle, Everton, Granby, and Vauxhall.

1997–2010: The City of Liverpool wards of Abercromby, Aigburth, Arundel, Dingle, Everton, Granby, Smithdown, and Vauxhall.

2010–2024: The City of Liverpool wards of Central, Greenbank, Kirkdale, Mossley Hill, Princes Park, Sefton Park, Riverside, and St Michael's.

=== Current ===
Further to the 2023 review of Westminster constituencies which came into effect for the 2024 general election, the constituency was defined as being composed of the following wards of the City of Liverpool as they existed on 1 December 2020:

- Anfield; Central; Everton; Kirkdale; Princes Park; Riverside.

The seat was subject to significant change, with the transfer of the (former) wards of Greenbank, Mossley Hill and St Michael's to Liverpool Wavertree, offset by the addition of the Anfield and Everton wards from Liverpool Walton.

Liverpool was subject to a comprehensive local government boundary review which came into effect in May 2023. As a result, the new constituency boundaries do not align with the revised ward boundaries. The constituency now comprises the following wards or part wards of the City of Liverpool from the 2024 general election:

- Anfield (most); Brownlow Hill; Canning (most); City Centre North; City Centre South; Dingle; Edge Hill (very small part); Everton East (most); Everton North; Everton West; Festival Gardens (most); Kensington & Fairfield (small part); Kirkdale East; Kirkdale West; Princes Park (most); Toxteth; Tuebrook Breckside Park (part); Vauxhall; Waterfront North; Waterfront South.

The constituency is one of five covering the city of Liverpool. It covers the central area of the city, including famous sights of the city such as the Royal Liver Building and Albert Dock. Neighbourhoods include Anfield, Canning, Chinatown, Dingle, Everton, Kirkdale, Toxteth and Vauxhall. It contains the University of Liverpool and Liverpool John Moores University, and is home to the city's two major football clubs – Liverpool F.C. (Anfield) and Everton F.C. (Hill Dickinson Stadium).

== Members of Parliament ==
Election	Member	Party
1983	Robert Parry	Labour
1997	Louise Ellman	Labour Co-op
October 2019	Louise Ellman	Independent
2019	Kim Johnson	Labour

== Elections ==
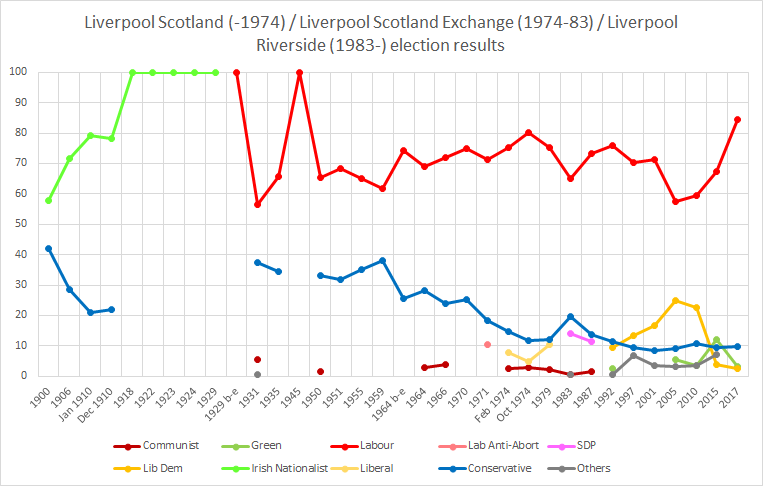
Liverpool Scotland / Riverside election results

=== Elections in the 2020s ===
General election 2024: Liverpool Riverside
Party	Candidate	Votes	%	±%
Labour	Kim Johnson	20,039	61.9	−23.2
Green	Chris Coughlan	5,246	16.2	+13.8
Reform	Gary Hincks	3,272	10.1	+7.5
Liberal Democrats	Rebecca Turner	1,544	4.8	+2.6
Conservative	Jane Austin	1,155	3.6	−4.2
TUSC	Roger Bannister	622	1.9	N/A
Liberal	Sean Weaver	256	0.8	N/A
NHA	Stephen McNally	247	0.8	N/A
Majority		14,793	45.7	−24.5
Turnout		32,381	44.7	−15.1
Registered electors		71,380		
Labour hold		Swing	-18.5	

=== Elections in the 2010s ===
General election 2019: Liverpool Riverside
Party	Candidate	Votes	%	±%
Labour	Kim Johnson	41,170	78.0	▼6.5
Conservative	Sean Malkeson	4,127	7.8	▼1.9
Green	Tom Crone	3,017	5.7	▲2.4
Liberal Democrats	Robert McAllister-Bell	2,696	5.1	▲2.6
Brexit Party	David Leach	1,779	3.4	New
Majority		37,043	70.2	▼4.6
Turnout		52,789	65.7	▲2.8
Labour hold		Swing	▼2.4	

General election 2017: Liverpool Riverside
Party	Candidate	Votes	%	±%
Labour and co-operative	Louise Ellman	40,599	84.5	▲17.1
Conservative	Pamela Hall	4,652	9.7	▲0.1
Green	Stephanie Pitchers	1,582	3.3	▼8.8
Liberal Democrats	Tom Sebire	1,187	2.5	▼1.4
Majority		35,947	74.8	▲19.5
Turnout		48,020	62.9	▲0.5
Labour Co-op hold		Swing	▲8.5	

General election 2015: Liverpool Riverside
Party	Candidate	Votes	%	±%
Labour and co-operative	Louise Ellman	29,835	67.4	▲8.1
Green	Martin Dobson	5,372	12.1	▲8.6
Conservative	Jackson Ng	4,245	9.6	▼1.3
UKIP	Joe Chiffers	2,510	5.7	▲4.0
Liberal Democrats	Paul Childs	1,719	3.9	▼18.8
TUSC	Tony Mulhearn	582	1.3	New
Majority		24,463	55.3	▲18.7
Turnout		44,263	62.4	▲10.3
Labour Co-op hold		Swing	▼0.3	

General election 2010: Liverpool Riverside
Party	Candidate	Votes	%	±%
Labour Co-op	Louise Ellman	22,998	59.3	▼0.1
Liberal Democrats	Richard Marbrow	8,825	22.7	▼0.6
Conservative	Kegang Wu	4,243	10.9	▲1.9
Green	Tom Crone	1,355	3.5	▼1.7
BNP	Peter Stafford	706	1.8	New
UKIP	Patricia Gaskell	674	1.7	▲0.1
Majority		14,173	36.6	▼0.5
Turnout		38,801	52.1	▲9.4
Labour Co-op hold		Swing	▲0.3	

=== Elections in the 2000s ===
The turnout compared to the 2001 election had risen by 7.4% to 41.5% (an above average increase). However, this was still the lowest throughout the United Kingdom which averaged 61.3% with a 2.1% increase.

General election 2005: Liverpool Riverside
Party	Candidate	Votes	%	±%
Labour Co-op	Louise Ellman	17,951	57.6	−13.8
Liberal Democrats	Richard Marbrow	7,737	24.8	+8.1
Conservative	Gabrielle J.F. Howatson	2,843	9.1	+0.7
Green	Peter A.E. Cranie	1,707	5.5	New
Socialist Labour	Beth R. Marshall	498	1.6	New
UKIP	Ann R.F. Irving	455	1.5	New
Majority		10,214	32.8	−21.9
Turnout		31,191	41.5	+7.4
Labour Co-op hold		Swing		

In the 2001 election it had a turnout of 34.1% which was the lowest of the United Kingdom. The average turnout in that year was 59.2%.

General election 2001: Liverpool Riverside
Party	Candidate	Votes	%	±%
Labour Co-op	Louise Ellman	18,201	71.4	+1.0
Liberal Democrats	Richard Marbrow	4,251	16.7	+3.4
Conservative	Judith Edwards	2,142	8.4	−1.1
Socialist Alliance	Cathy Wilson	909	3.6	+1.6
Majority		13,950	54.7	−2.4
Turnout		25,503	34.1	−17.5
Labour Co-op hold		Swing		

=== Elections in the 1990s ===
General election 1997: Liverpool Riverside
Party	Candidate	Votes	%	±%
Labour Co-op	Louise Ellman	26,858	70.4	
Liberal Democrats	Beatrice L. Fraenkel	5,059	13.3	
Conservative	David G. Sparrow	3,635	9.5	
Socialist	Cathy Wilson	776	2.0	New
Liberal	David W. Green	594	1.6	New
Referendum	George Skelly	586	1.5	New
ProLife Alliance	Heather M. Neilson	277	0.7	New
Multi-Racial Anti-Corruption Alliance	David Braid	179	0.5	New
Natural Law	Geoffrey Gay	171	0.5	
Majority		21,799	57.1	
Turnout		38,135	51.6	
Labour Co-op hold		Swing		

General election 1992: Liverpool Riverside
Party	Candidate	Votes	%	±%
Labour	Robert Parry	20,550	75.9	+2.7
Conservative	Andrew Zsigmond	3,113	11.5	−2.3
Liberal Democrats	Mohammed Akbar Ali	2,498	9.3	−2.0
Green	Lawrence Brown	738	2.7	New
Natural Law	John D. Collins	169	0.6	New
Majority		17,437	64.4	+5.0
Turnout		27,068	54.6	−4.7
Labour hold		Swing	+2.5	

=== Elections in the 1980s ===
General election 1987: Liverpool Riverside
Party	Candidate	Votes	%	±%
Labour	Robert Parry	25,505	73.2	+8.3
Conservative	Stephen Fitzsimmons	4,816	13.8	−6.0
SDP	Baldey Singh Chahal	3,912	11.3	−2.7
Communist	Katherine Gardner	601	1.7	+1.0
Majority		20,689	59.4	+14.3
Turnout		34,834	65.3	+2.9
Labour hold		Swing	+7.5	

General election 1983: Liverpool Riverside
Party	Candidate	Votes	%	±%
Labour	Robert Parry	24,978	64.9	−2.0
Conservative	Thomas Morrison	7,600	19.8	−0.7
SDP	Peter Zentner	5,381	14.0	+3.2
Communist	John Blevin	261	0.7	New
Workers Revolutionary	David Latchford	234	0.6	New
Majority		17,378	45.1	−1.3
Turnout		38, 454	62.4	
Labour win (new seat)				

== See also ==
- List of parliamentary constituencies in Merseyside
