= Nancy Flanagan =

British community worker and activist (1929–2025)

Anne Nancy Flanagan MBE (1929 – 13 February 2025) was a British local community worker and rights activist, living in the Vauxhall area of Liverpool.

== Work and Activism ==
Flanagan worked to improve the health, social and living conditions within the Vauxhall area for over 40 years, starting when she became chairperson of the Vauxhall Project in 1969. Flanagan held the position for three years. In 1984 she became chairperson of the Vauxhall Neighbourhood Council and as of 2015 was still active, as well as being chairperson of the Heriot Street Residents Association. Throughout her 50 years of public service, Flanagan did not take a salary and contributed her time voluntarily.

Flanagan was involved in the campaign to build the Vauxhall Health Centre in Limekiln Lane and other projects, like the Vauxhall Health Forum. As well as these causes, Flanagan was involved with the establishing of the Vauxhall Neighbourhood Council's day nursery, the Merseyside Accredited Childcare Training and Assessment Centre (MACTAC), VNC Lifeline and Vauxhall Sure Start. Her work was recognised in 2004, when Flanagan was awarded the MBE for her endeavours within her local community.

Flanagan died on 13 February 2025, at the age of 95.
