= David Logan (British politician) =

British Labour politician (1871–1964)

Member of Parliament for Liverpool Scotland
- In office 1929–1964
- Preceded by: T.P. O'Connor
- Succeeded by: Walter Alldritt

Personal details
- Born: 22 November 1871
- Died: 25 February 1964 (aged 92)
- Party: Labour Party (UK)

David Gilbert Logan CBE (22 November 1871 – 25 February 1964), known as Davie Logan, was a Labour Party politician in the United Kingdom of Scots-Irish descent. He succeeded T.P. O'Connor as member of Parliament for Liverpool Scotland in 1929 (44 years after O'Connor had been first elected). He was the oldest MP in Parliament when he died in 1964.

== Biography ==
Born in the Scotland Road area of Liverpool, Logan was the son of Thomas Logan, a ship's cook, and Catherine (McHugh) Logan.

He was Member of Parliament (MP) for Liverpool, Scotland from 1929 until his death in 1964, aged 92, becoming the oldest MP since Samuel Young in 1918. Logan was later surpassed by S. O. Davies, who died in office aged 92. Logan was the earliest-born MP to serve under the 70-year reign of Elizabeth II.

Logan was a longtime associate of the previous MP (O'Connor), as well as having his own strong involvement in the Irish Nationalist movement prior to joining the Labour Party, serving on Liverpool City Council as a nationalist councillor.

He was elected for the Scotland ward from 1909 to 1911, then represented Scotland North from 1911 to 1918 as a Nationalist councillor, before taking the Labour whip. He served until 1931, before becoming an Alderman and leader of Liverpool Labour party from 1942 to 1951.

== Notes ==
Parliament of the United Kingdom
Preceded by T.P. O'Connor	Member of Parliament for Liverpool Scotland; 1929–1964	Succeeded by Walter Alldritt
Preceded by Murdoch Macdonald	Oldest sitting member (nb not Father of the House); 1950 – 1964	Succeeded by Winston Churchill
