= 1964 Liverpool Scotland by-election =

UK parliamentary by-election

The 1964 Liverpool Scotland by-election was a parliamentary by-election held in England on 11 June 1964 for the British House of Commons constituency of Liverpool Scotland.

The by-election filled the vacancy left by the death of the Labour Member of Parliament (MP) David Logan on 25 February the same year. The seat was retained by the Labour Party.

== Result ==
Liverpool Scotland by election, 1964
Party	Candidate	Votes	%	±%
Labour	Walter Alldritt	13,558	74.32	+12.5
Conservative	Brian Keefe	4,684	25.68	−12.5
Majority		8,874	48.64	+25.00
Turnout		18,242		
Labour hold		Swing	+12.5	
