= 1929 Liverpool Scotland by-election =

UK Parliamentary by-election

The 1929 Liverpool Scotland by-election was a parliamentary by-election held in England on 14 December 1929 to elect a new Member of Parliament (MP) for the British House of Commons constituency of the Scotland division of Liverpool.

It was caused by the death of the constituency's sitting MP T.P. O'Connor, the then Father of the House and an Irish Nationalist MP, on 18 November 1929. O'Connor had held the seat since its creation at the 1885 general election, and had been re-elected unopposed from 1918 onwards, most recently in May 1929.

The by-election was extremely unusual in that it was uncontested and still changed hands.

Ireland had achieved quasi-independence in 1922 as the Irish Free State, the Irish Nationalist Party was effectively defunct in Ireland, yet O'Connor continued to be elected unopposed under this label in Liverpool. O'Connor's voting record in the Commons most closely followed that of the Labour Party. At the by-election, Labour was the only party to nominate a candidate, standing David Logan. As a result he won the seat unopposed, though in practice this did not make much difference to the voting balance in the House of Commons where the Second Labour Government was in a minority.

Liverpool Scotland by-election, 1929
Party	Candidate	Votes	%	±%
Labour	David Logan	Unopposed		
Labour gain from Irish Nationalist				
