= James William Carling =

Pavement artist (1857–1887)

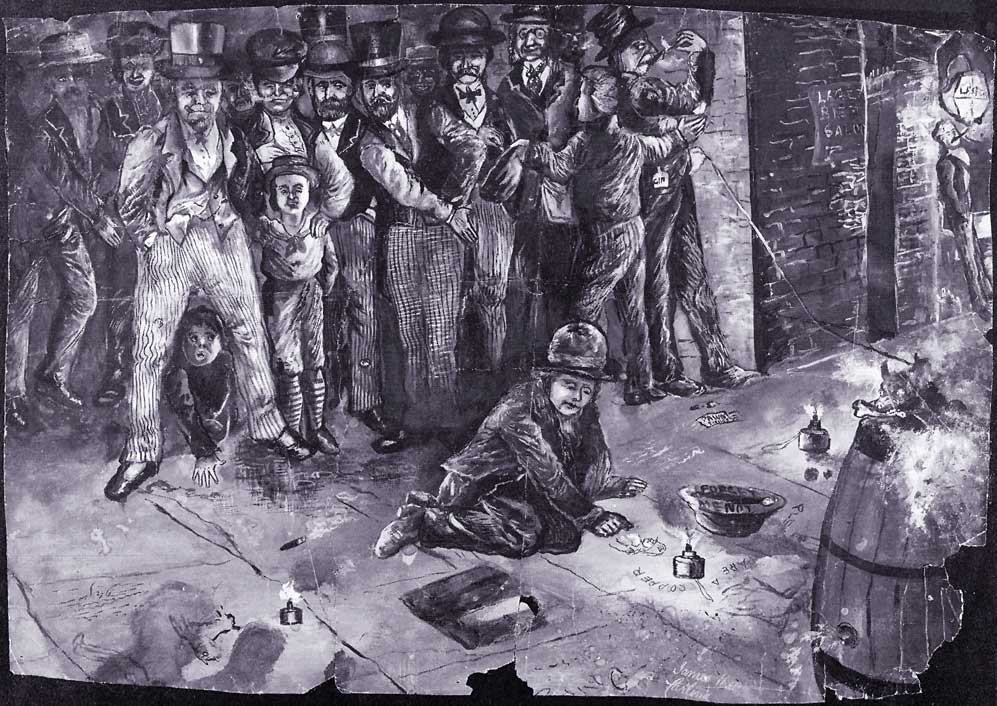
James Carling self-portrait as a child pavement artist, c.1880.

James William Carling (31 December 1857 – 9 July 1887) was a pavement artist from Liverpool, England.

Carling was born on 31 December 1857 at 38 Addison Street, Liverpool. His parents Henry and Rose had been married in Roscommon, Ireland, his father's original surname was Carolan, anglicised to Carling following his emigration to England after being evicted during the Irish Famine. His mother's maiden name was Lynch. His mother died when he was aged only 6 years. His father died 4 years after the death of his mother. From an early age James was known as the "little drawer" or "THE LITTLE CHALKER" and used Liverpool's street pavements for his art and to beg for money. He attended Holy Cross School in Fontenoy Street. After he was arrested by a policeman on Christmas Eve in 1865 and a week in a workhouse, he was sent to St George's Roman Catholic Boys Industrial School in Everton, Liverpool.

After leaving the industrial school in 1871, he travelled to America to join his elder brother Henry and to attempt to become as successful an artist as Henry. While in America, James supported himself as a sidewalk artist and Vaudeville caricaturist. In Chicago, aged 23 years, he entered a competition in Harper's Magazine to illustrate a special edition of the Edgar Allan Poe poem The Raven. He was unsuccessful but his drawings are now exhibited in the Edgar Allan Poe Museum in Richmond, Virginia.

James Carling returned to Liverpool in 1887 with intentions to further his artwork and career. He became ill and was admitted to Liverpool Workhouse on 17 June 1887. He died on 9 July 1887 aged 29 and was buried in an unmarked pauper's grave at Walton Park Cemetery due to there being no known next of kin information for him.

Carling's life and times are celebrated annually in his birthplace Liverpool, England, with The James Carling International Pavement Art Competition. This takes place on Bold Street, the very street where, as James Carling puts it, "I not only could not draw in that street, I could not walk in it”

== Quotes ==
From his unpublished Autobiography

"People prone to look upon the surface (and even the best judges of character, keenest of observers never see the life below the lower classes when occupying a niche or two above the class they would seek to hear about) are in utter ignorance concerning the desperate lives of the ragged children around them. They imagine because their accents are rough and their habits typical of the boxing den that their poverty and neglect of person are attributable to their innate ignorance and their natural depravity—but let one of them state that it is not their vulgarity. Refine and tone the boisterous gamin, give him the chances that your delicate aristocrats have, and the boy that dips his head in the mud for ha’penniers is not only the equal of your Norman descended scions but by the law of the fittest and the rule of the future, his superior in theory as well as in practice, and I know it!
Alas for them, they have no champions; none have ever drawn the sword in defence of the prodigy in rags. His brain develops in an iron mask, no room nor show for the poverty stricken genius. Others with lesser minds usurp the place of the natural nobility and the bright sons of the streets cut off in a land where talents are smothered, sink down like the sun in the shadow of poverty and crime.
Yet they shall be heard from in the bye and bye. This narrative—a still small voice, may herald the thunders of a future race and I launch this book like an old bottle upon the waters—to read when I am gone, when I have fretted my busy hour and am seen no more.”

== Gallery ==
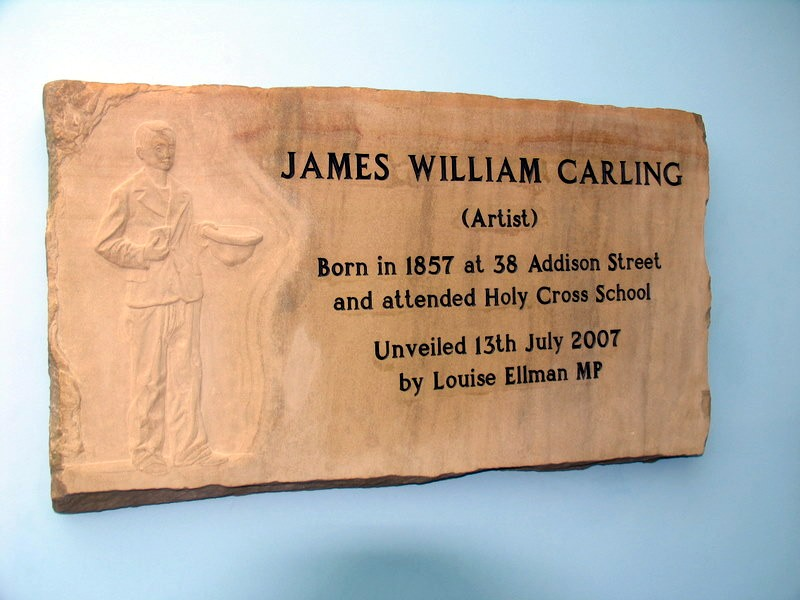
James Carling memorial plaque at Holy Cross School, Liverpool.

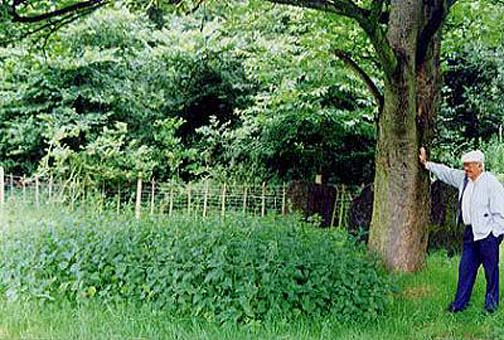
James Carling's unmarked grave at Walton Park Cemetery, Liverpool.

== Illustrations for The Raven ==
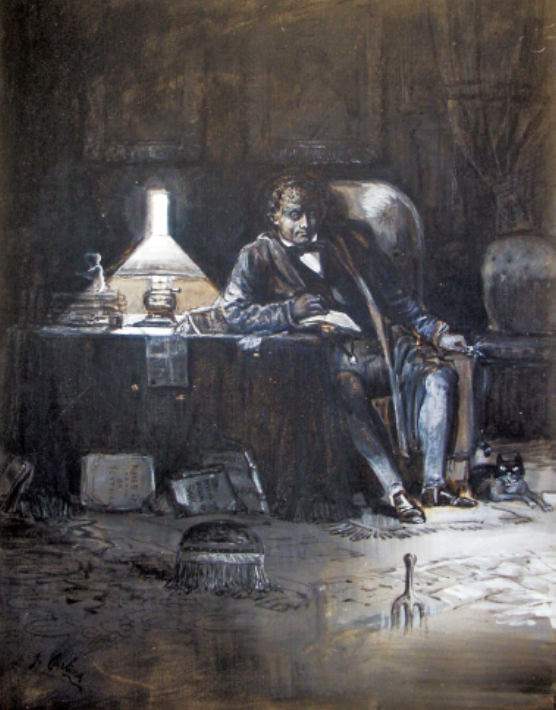

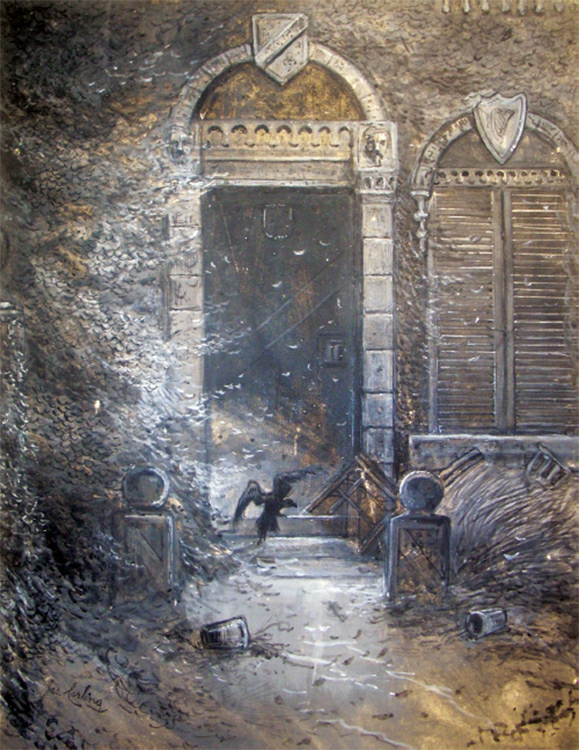

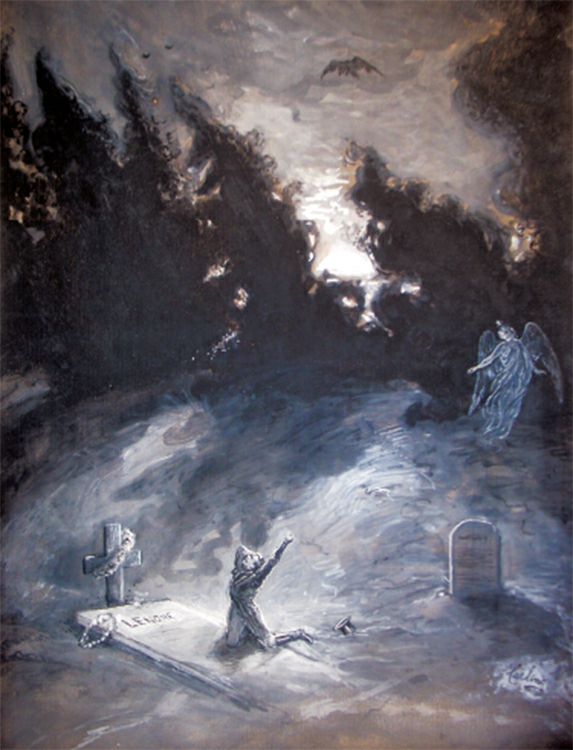

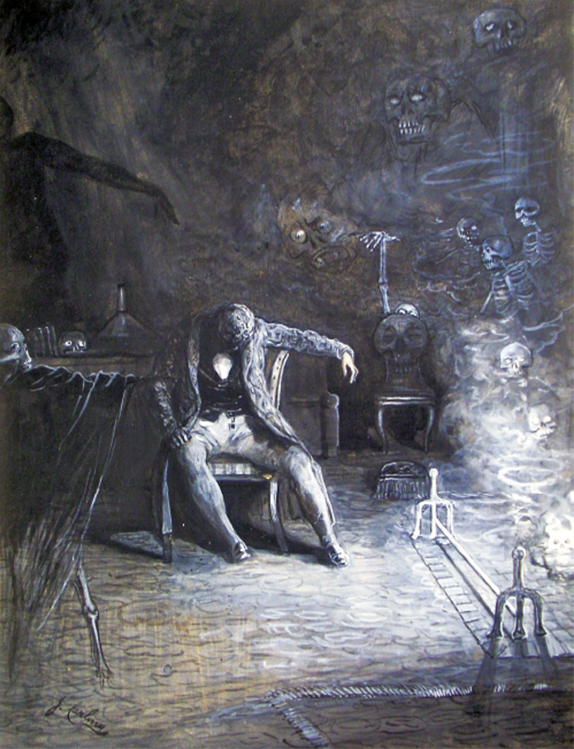

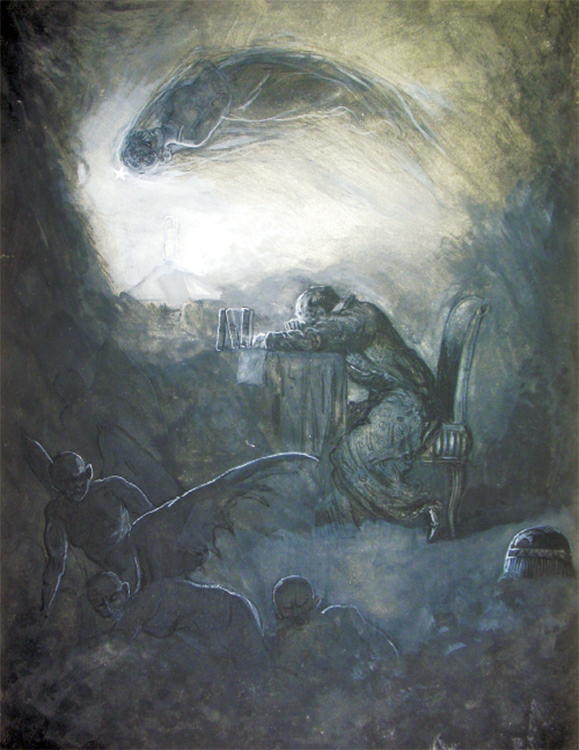

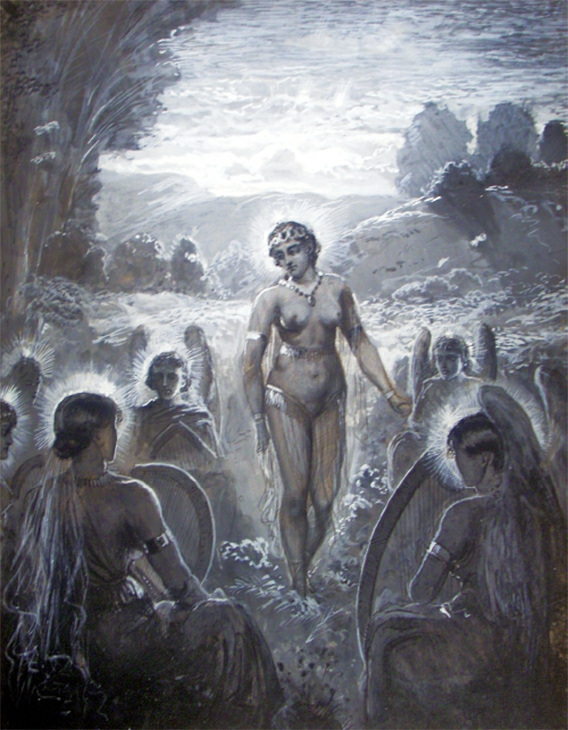

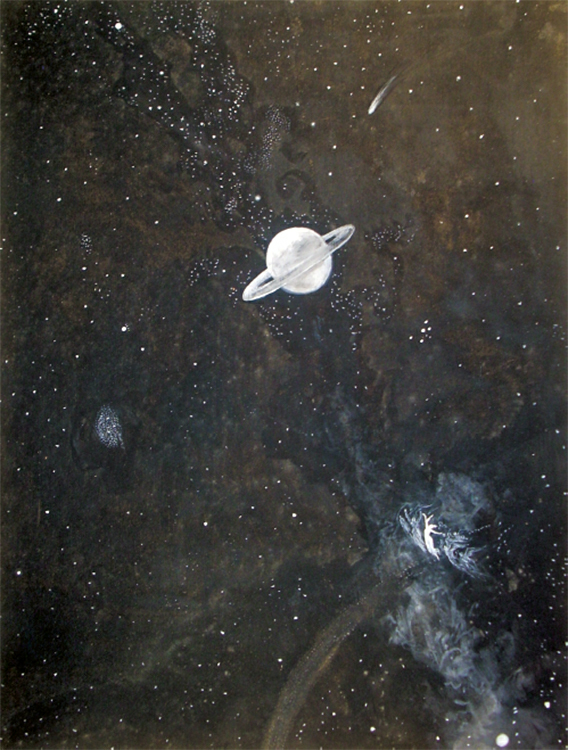

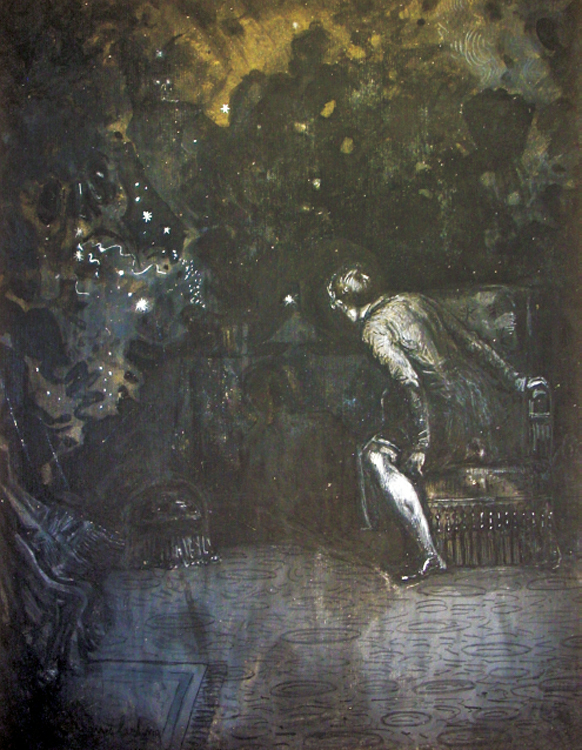

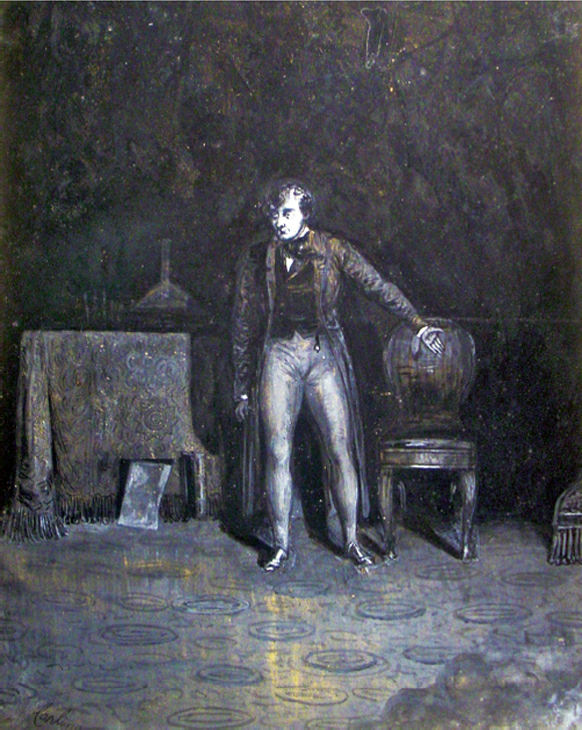

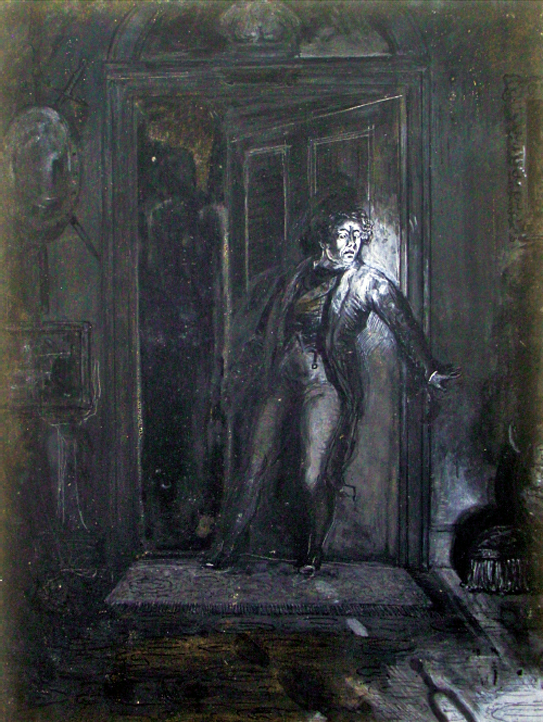

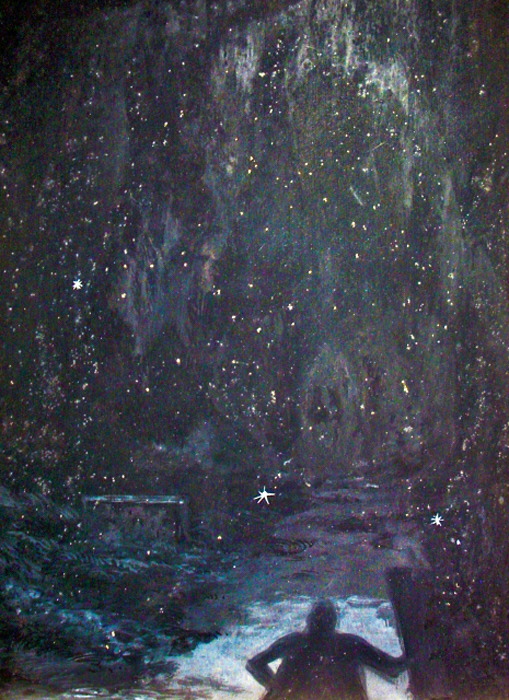

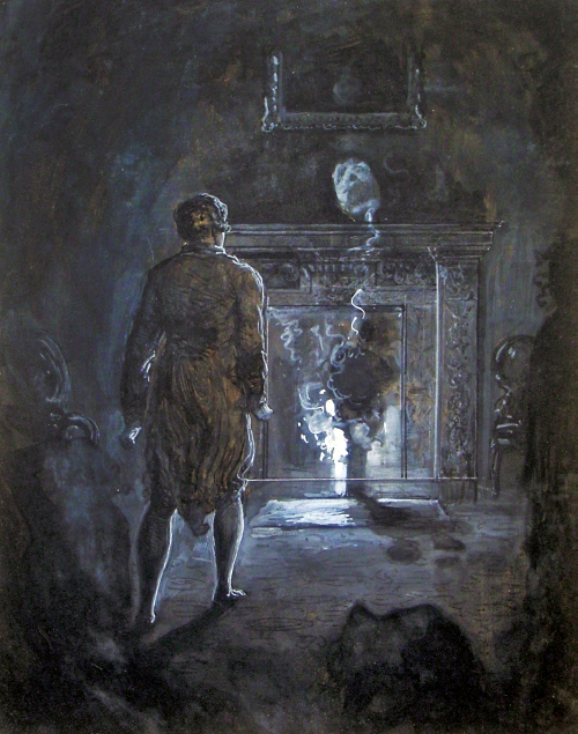

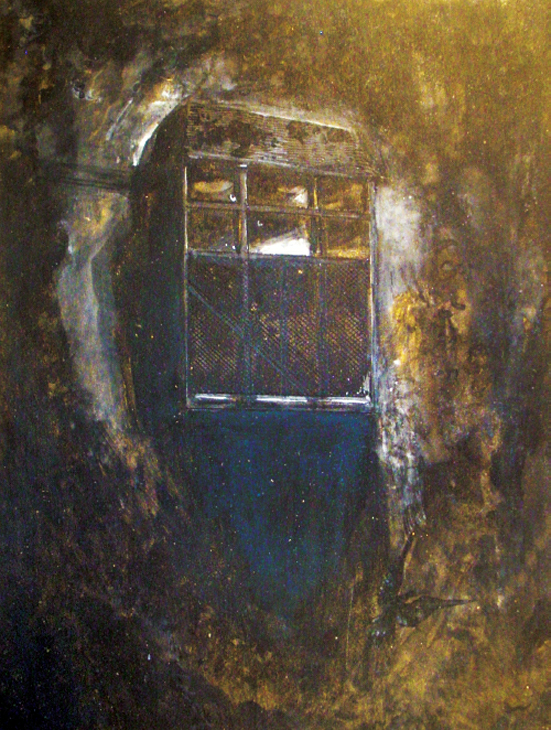

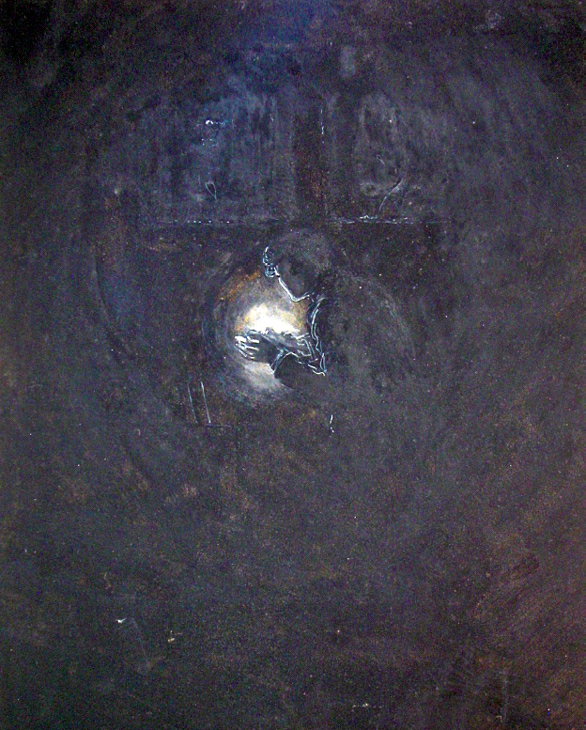

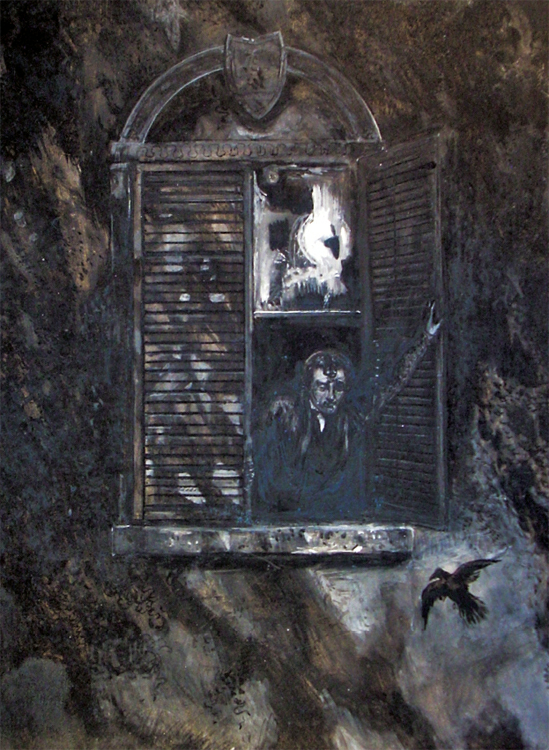

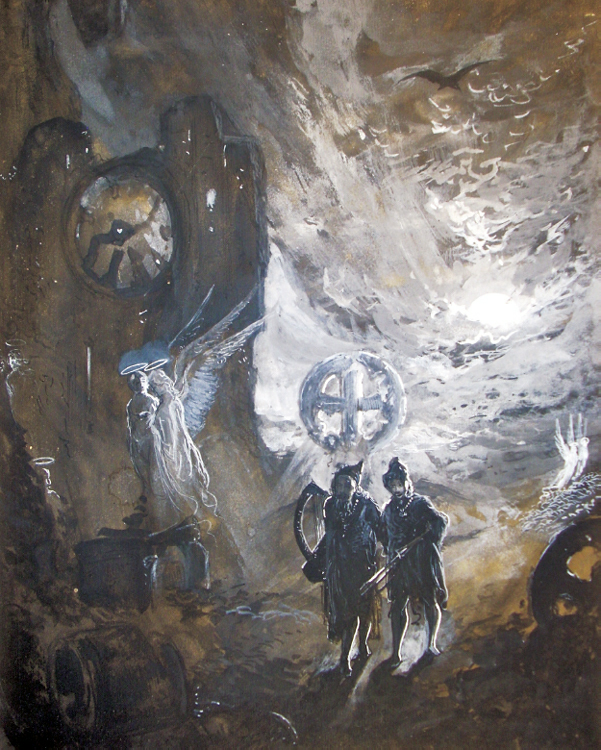

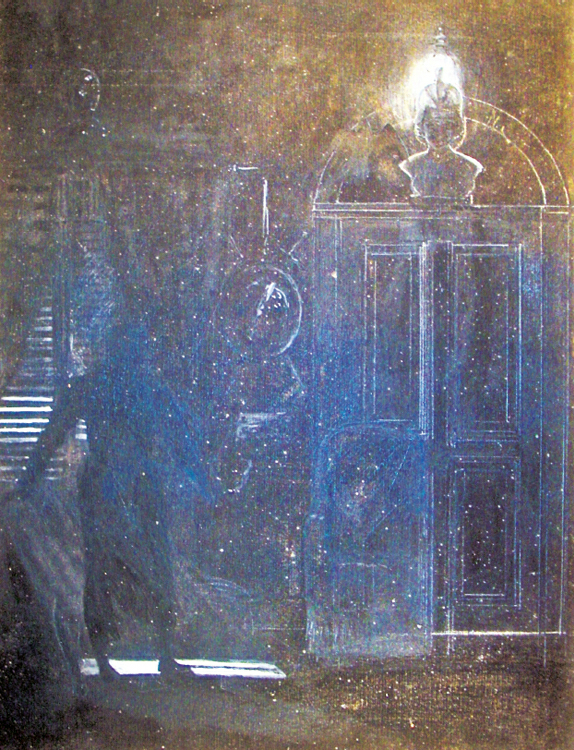

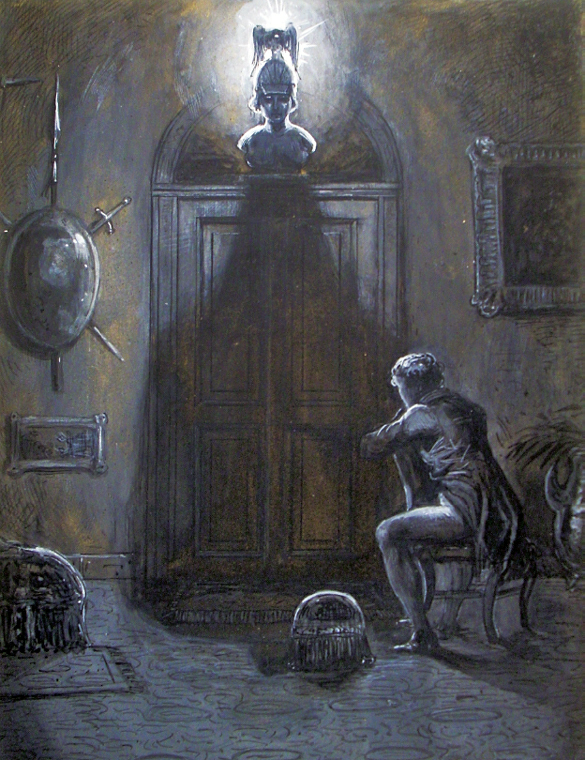

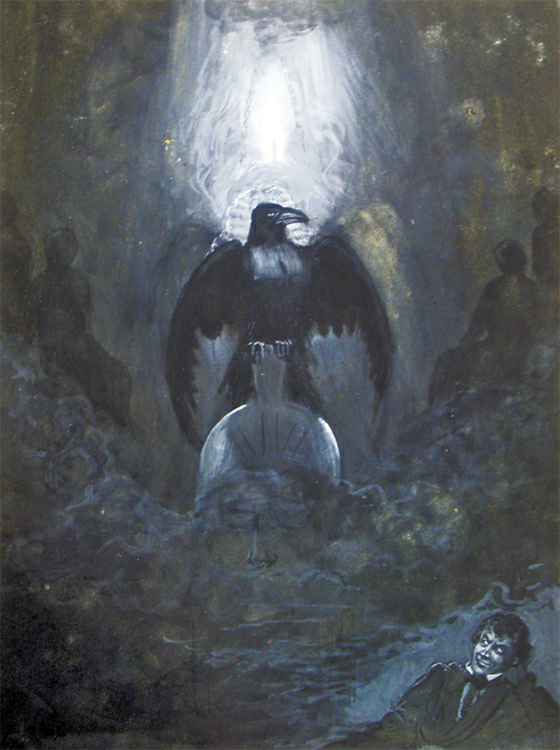

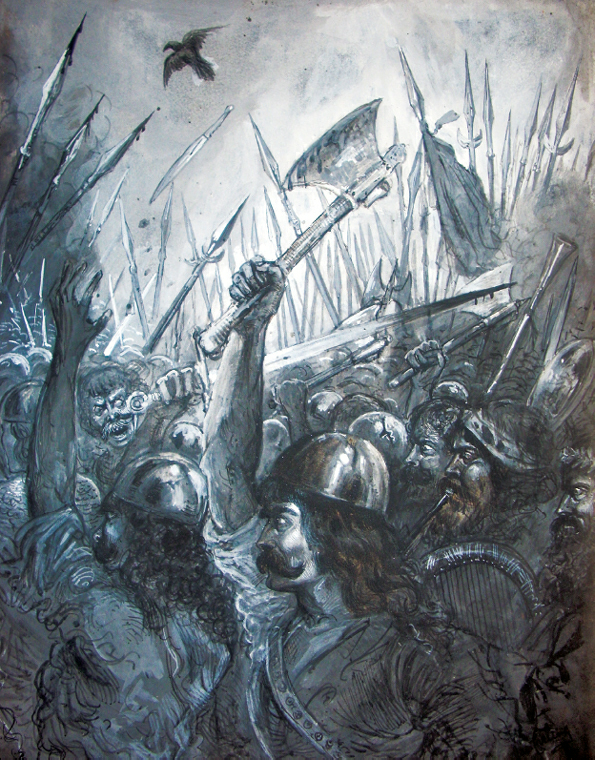

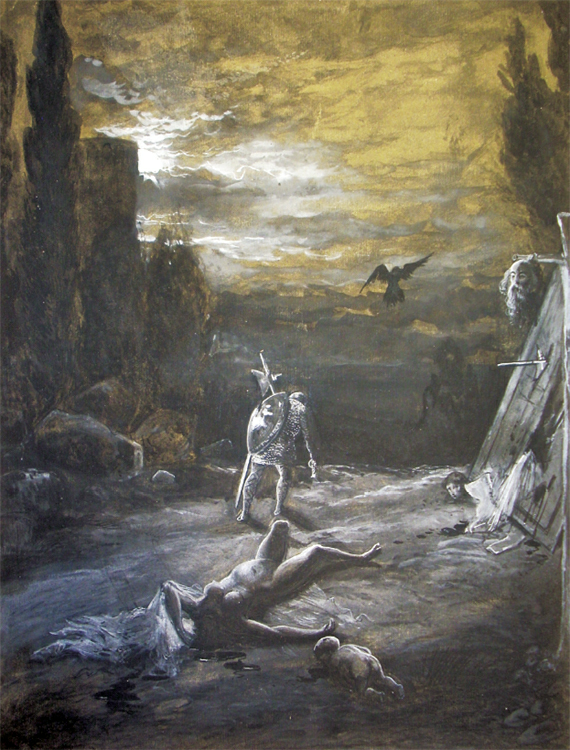

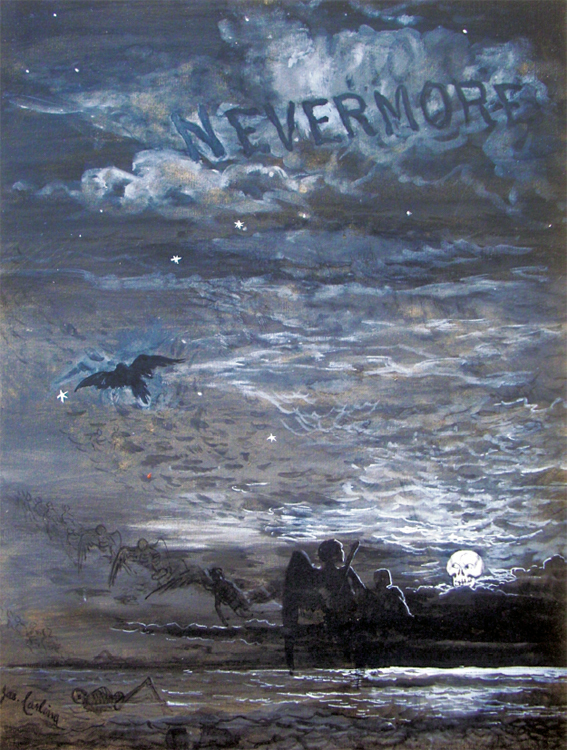

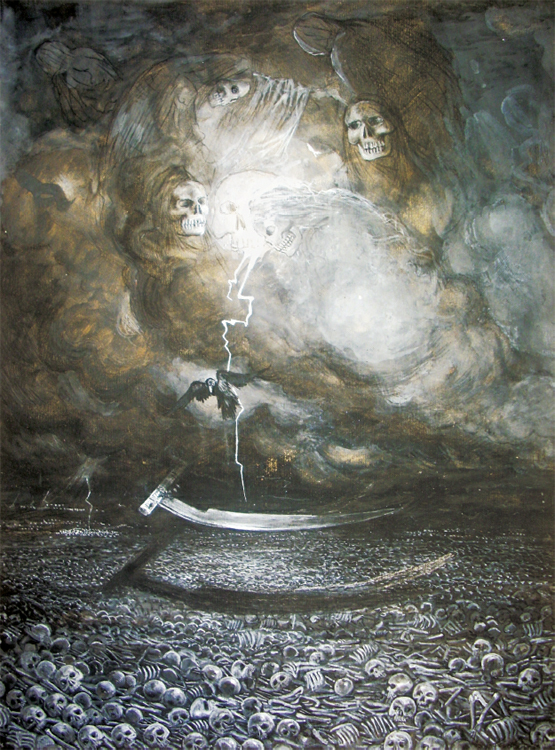

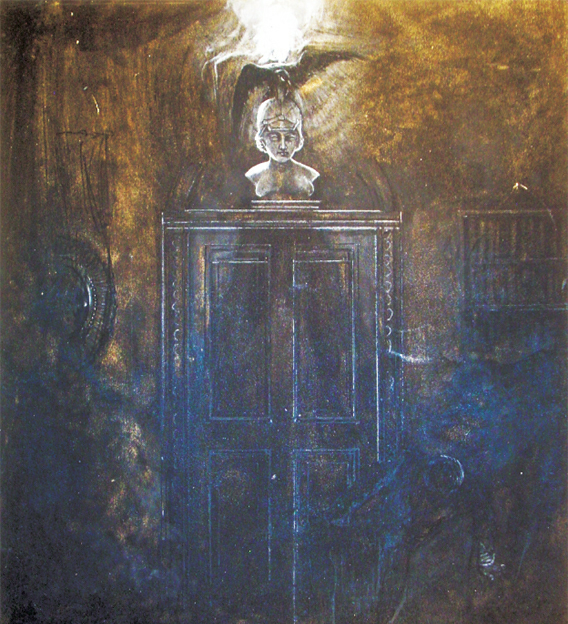

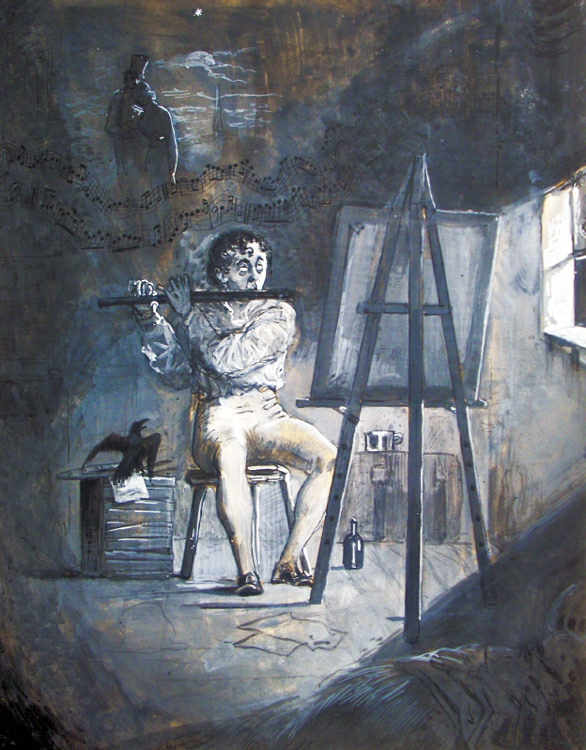

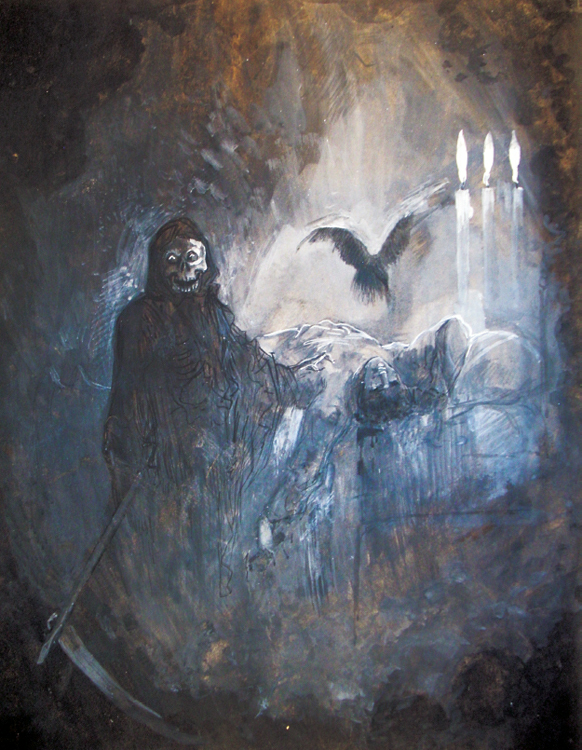

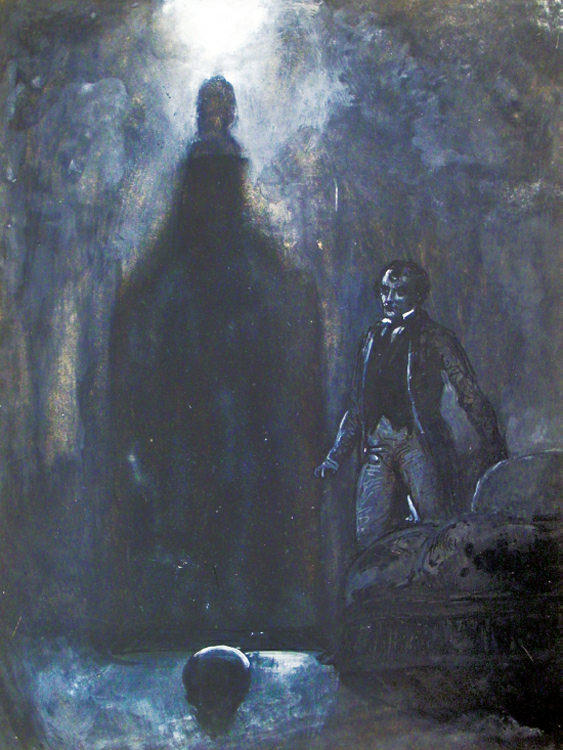

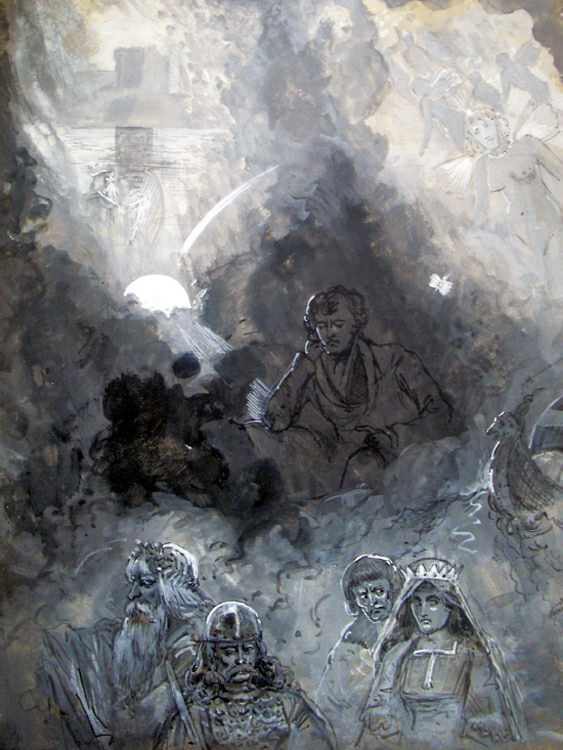

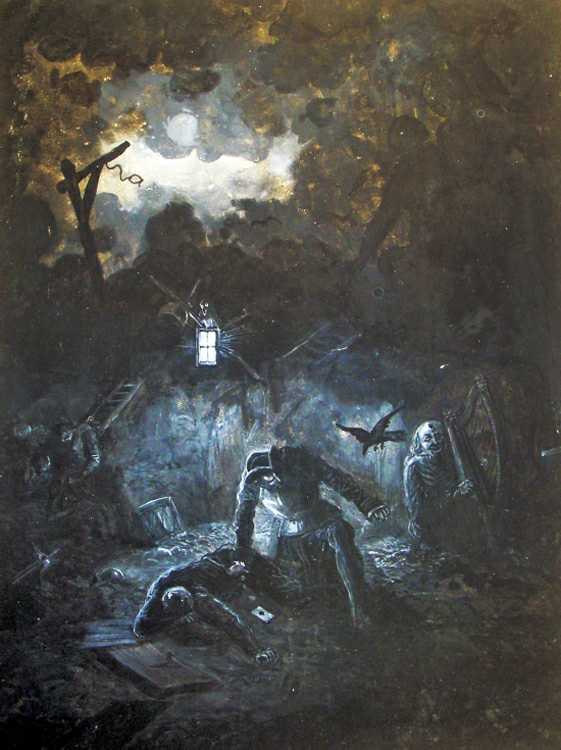

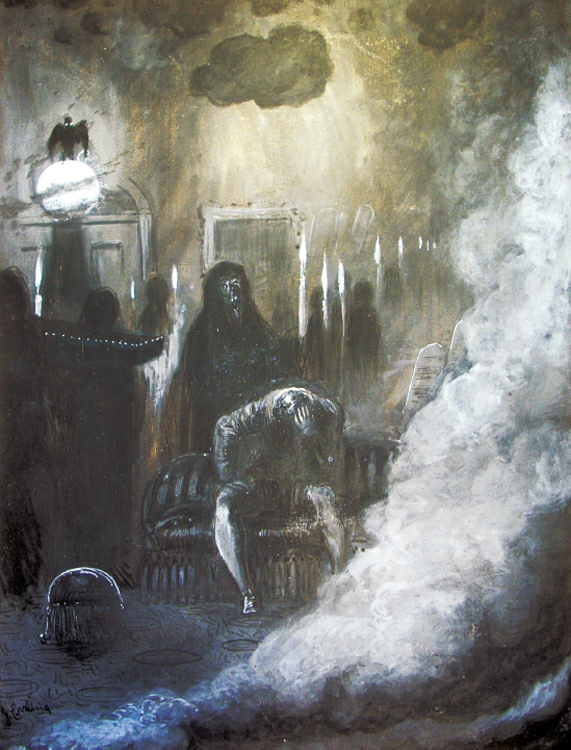

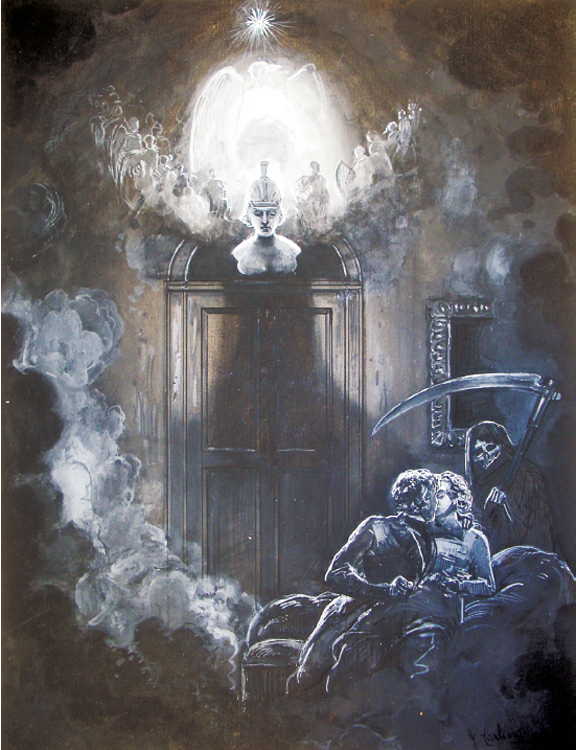

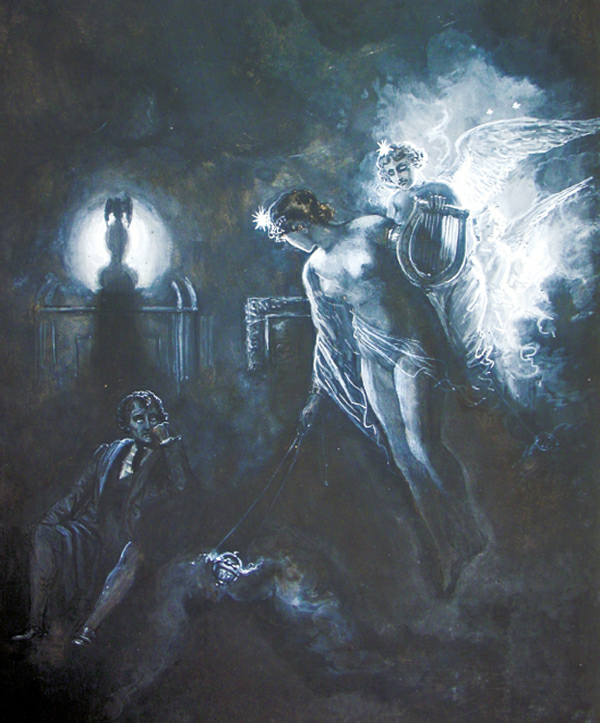

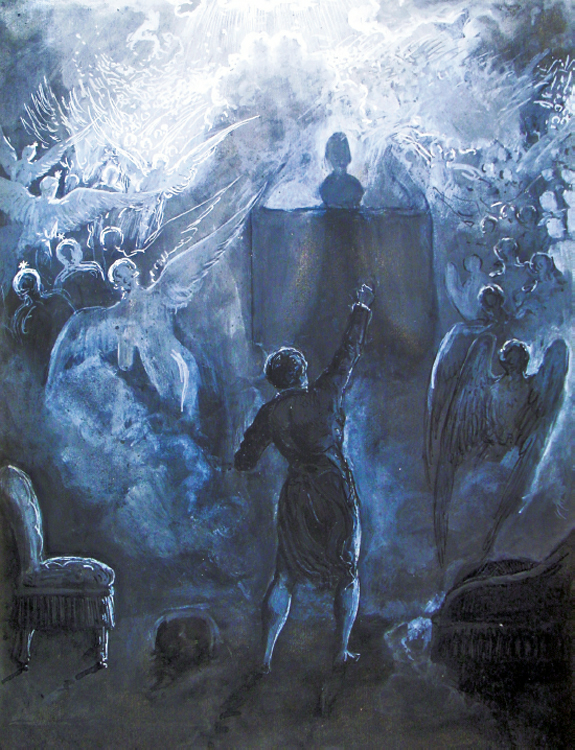

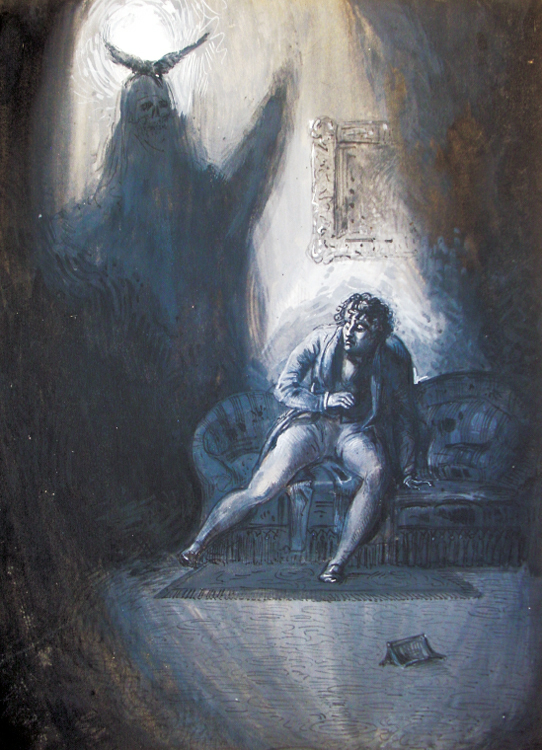

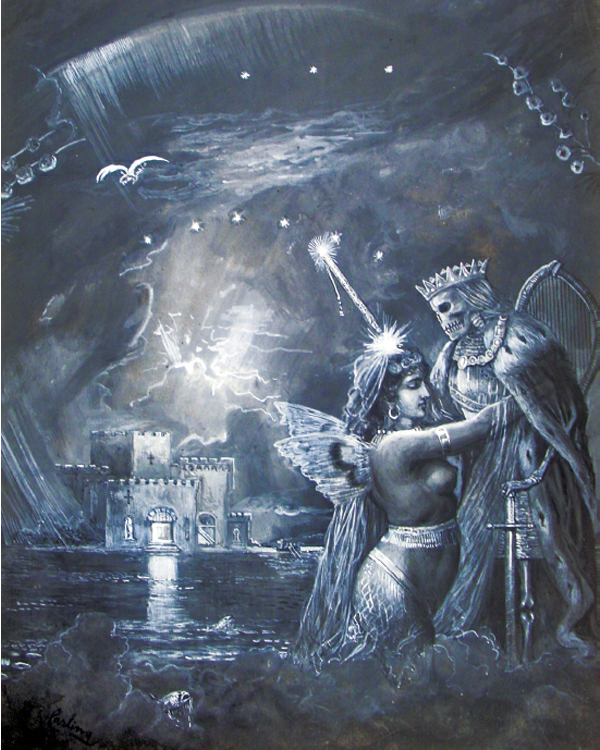

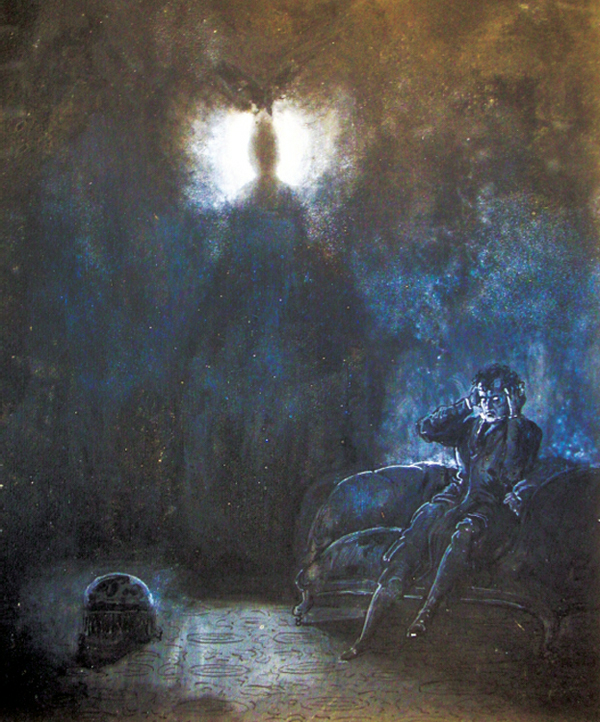

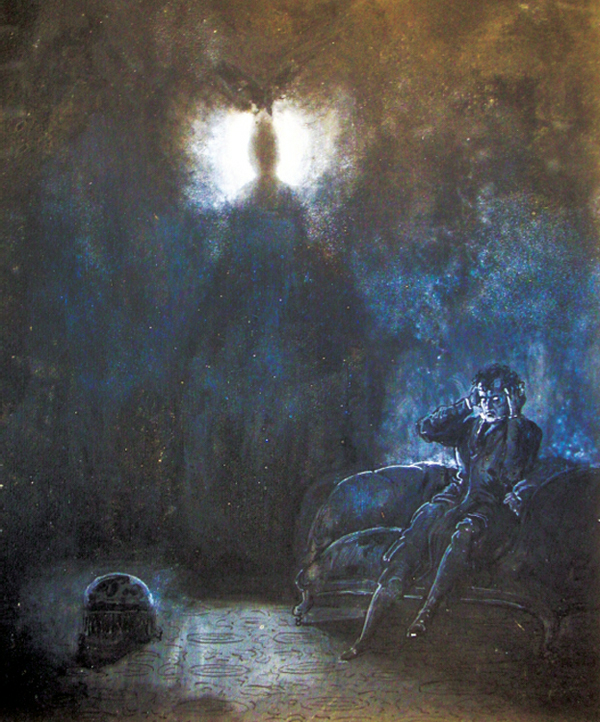

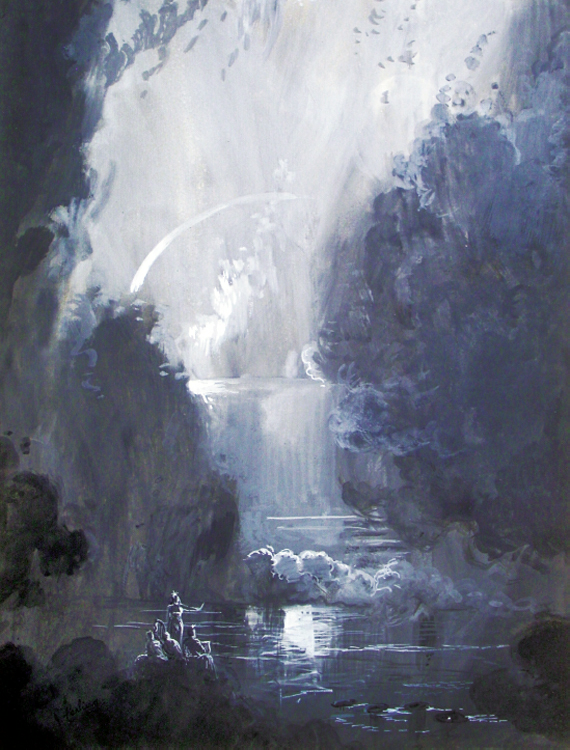

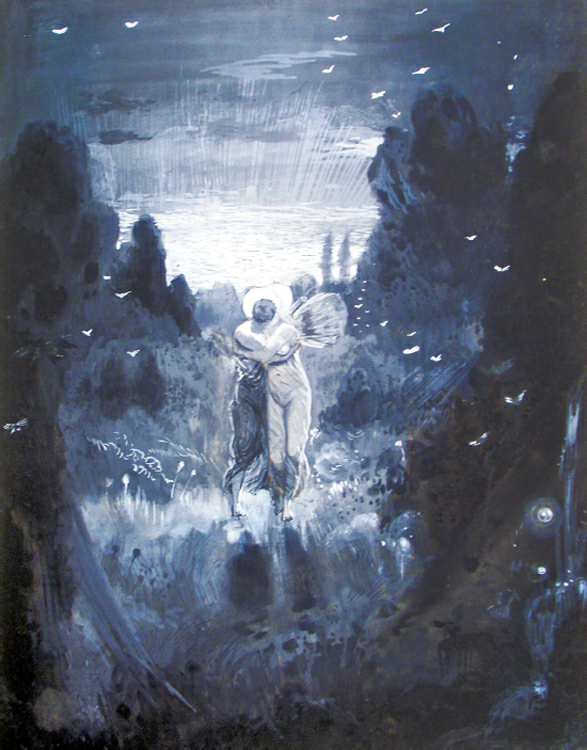

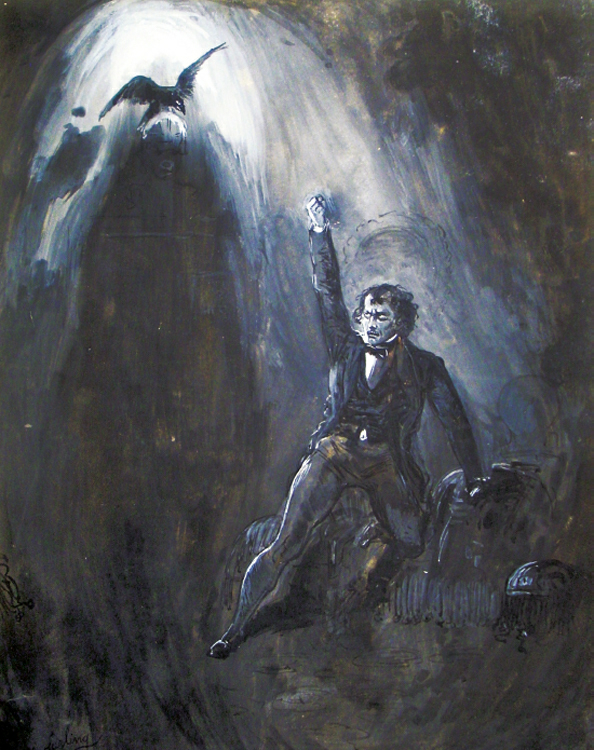

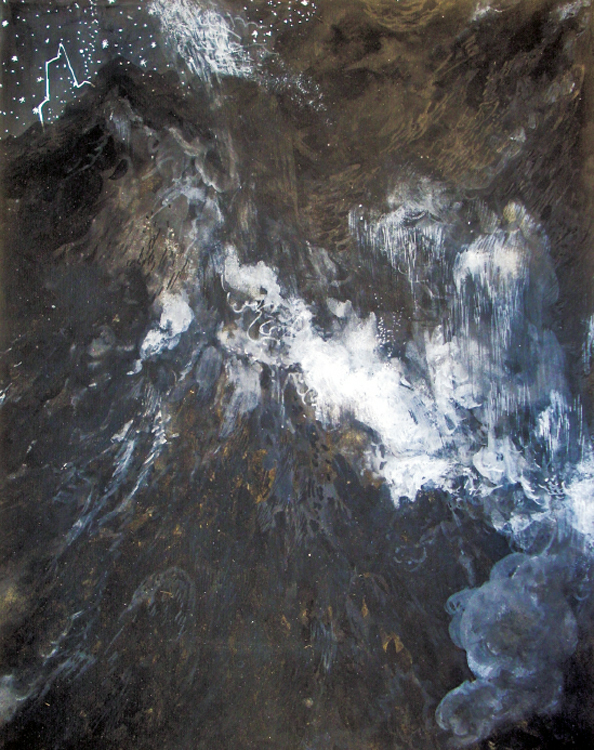

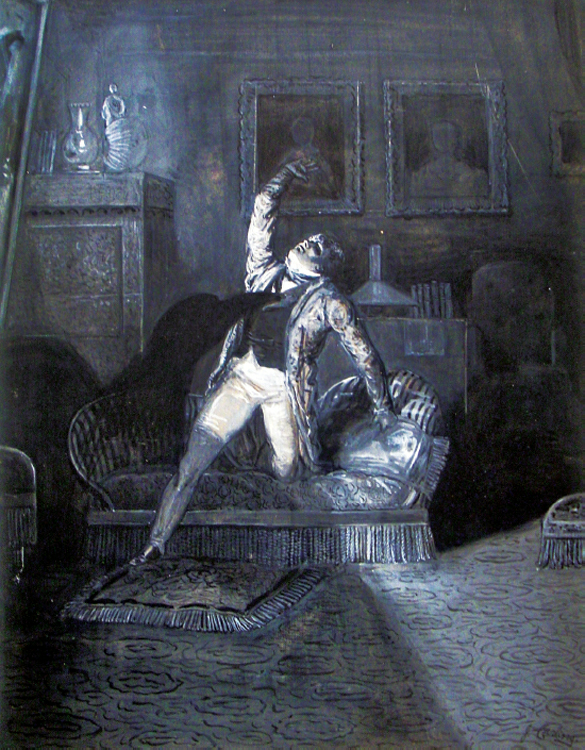

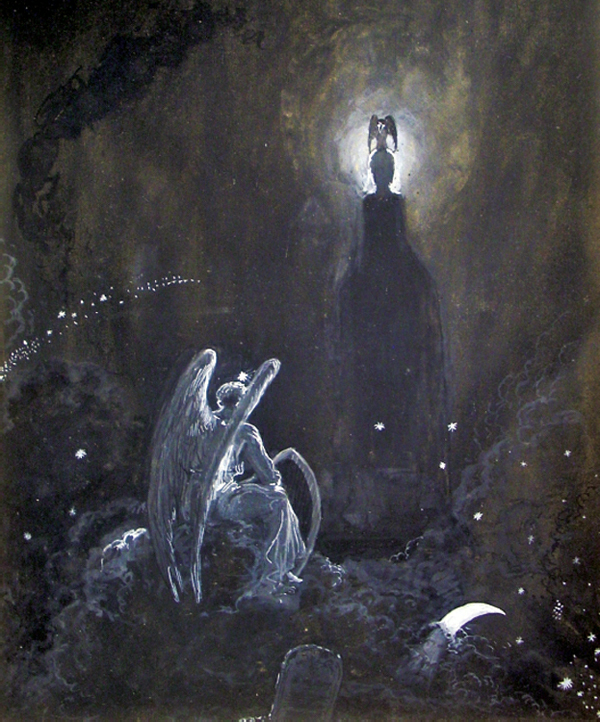

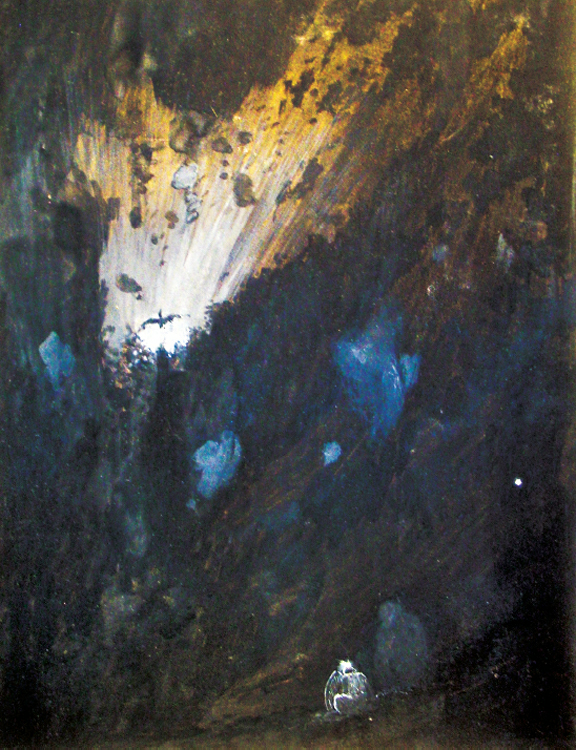

== Bibliography ==
- James Carling illustrations of Edgar Allan Poe's The Raven. ISBN 0-911303-03-0.
- Kelly, Michael. Liverpool's Irish Connection. ISBN 0955485401.
