= Kim Johnson (politician) =

British Labour politician

Kim Johnson MP
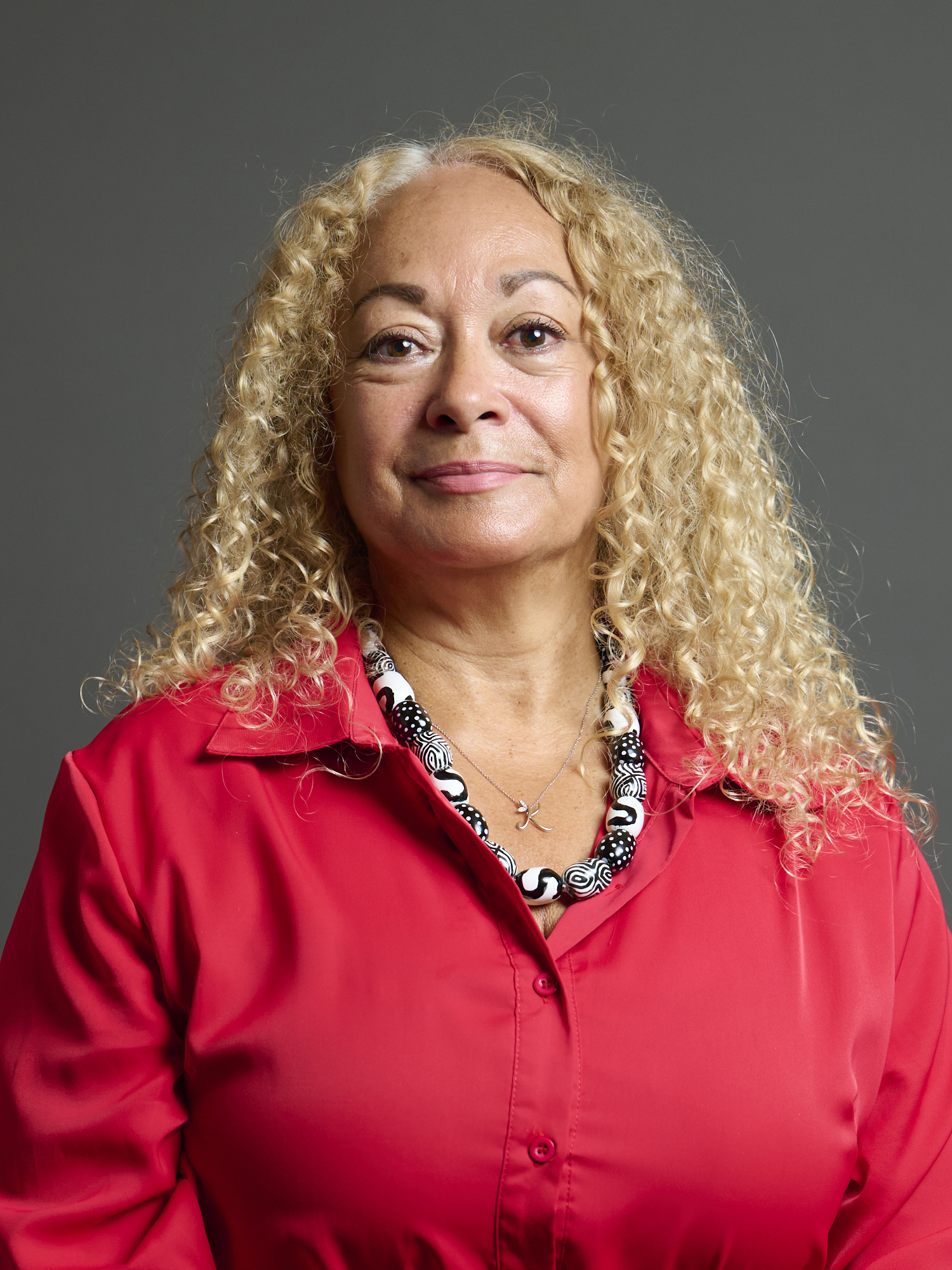
- Official portrait, 2024

Member of Parliament for Liverpool Riverside
- Incumbent
- Assumed office 12 December 2019
- Preceded by: Louise Ellman
- Majority: 14,793 (45.7%)

Personal details
- Born: Kim Marie Johnson; 25 August 1966 (age 60) Liverpool, England
- Party: Labour
- Other political affiliations: Socialist Campaign Group (2019–present)
- Children: 2

Kim Marie Johnson (born 25 August 1966) is a British Labour Party politician who has been the Member of Parliament (MP) for Liverpool Riverside since 2019.

== Early life and career ==
Kim Johnson was born in Liverpool on the 25 August 1966, the daughter of Joseph Johnson and Kathleen Johnson. She has a Diploma in Youth and Community Work, a BA in Social Studies, and a Postgraduate Certificate.

Since 2015, Johnson has been the Chairperson of Squash Liverpool, a community interest company. In 2020, she became a patron of Mandela8.

Prior to becoming an MP, Johnson was a Unison shop steward. She held a role of creative diversity manager in the Capital of Culture bid team, representing the longest established black community in the country.

== Parliamentary career ==
On 4 November 2019, Johnson was selected as the Labour candidate for Liverpool Riverside by a panel made up of national, regional and local party representatives. At the 2019 general election, Johnson was elected to Parliament with 78.0% of the vote and a majority of 37,043.

Johnson sits on the Women and Equalities Committee, Education Committee and the Speaker's Advisory Committee on Works of Art.

On 15 October 2020, Johnson resigned as Parliamentary Private Secretary to Angela Rayner to vote against the proposed Covert Human Intelligence Sources (Criminal Conduct) Bill, defying the Labour whip which was to abstain.

On 10 May 2021, Johnson publicly described the shadow cabinet reshuffle, and specifically leader Keir Starmer's treatment of Rayner, as a "despicable act of cowardice". She again criticised the leadership after Starmer wrote an article for The Sun, a newspaper many in her Liverpool constituency had been boycotting after its coverage of the Hillsborough disaster.

In February 2022, Johnson was re-selected as the Labour candidate for Liverpool Riverside at the 2024 general election.

In June 2022, Johnson accused Merseyside Police of being "institutionally racist" after officers carried out an armed stop and search of two black men in Liverpool.

In February 2023, while asking a question at Prime Minister's Questions, Johnson described the Israeli government as "fascist". A spokesperson for the Labour Party described Johnson's comments as "completely unacceptable". Later the same day, Johnson raised a point of order in the House of Commons and apologised "unreservedly" for her language.

At the 2024 general election, Johnson was re-elected as MP for Liverpool Riverside with a decreased vote share of 61.9% and a decreased majority of 14,793.

== Personal life ==
Johnson has a son and daughter. Her grandmother, Mary Higgins, was born in Dublin and Johnson has said that she is 'very proud of her Irish heritage'.

Parliament of the United Kingdom
Preceded by Dame Louise Ellman	Member of Parliament for Liverpool Riverside; 2019–present	Incumbent
