= Liverpool Scotland =

Parliamentary constituency in the United Kingdom, 1885–1974

- Former borough constituency for the House of Commons

1885–1974
- Seats: One
- Created from: Liverpool
- Replaced by: Liverpool Scotland Exchange

Liverpool Scotland was a constituency represented in the House of Commons of the Parliament of the United Kingdom. It elected one Member of Parliament (MP) by the first past the post system of election.

It was located within the city of Liverpool in England, centred on Scotland Road. The constituency was notable as the only parliamentary constituency in Great Britain to elect an Irish nationalist Member of Parliament. Between 1885 and 1964, a span of seventy-nine years, the constituency was represented by only two MPs.

The constituency was created under the Redistribution of Seats Act 1885, when the former Liverpool constituency was split into nine divisions. It was abolished for the February 1974 general election, when it was merged with Liverpool Exchange to form the Liverpool Scotland Exchange constituency.

== Members of Parliament ==
Election	Member	Party
1885	T.P. O'Connor	Irish Parliamentary
1929 by-election	David Logan	Labour
1964 by-election	Walter Alldritt	Labour
1971 by-election	Frank Marsden	Labour
Feb 1974	constituency abolished: see Liverpool Scotland Exchange	

Liverpool Scotland was characterized by having two MPs of exceptionally long service. T.P. O'Connor served in the constituency for 44 years until his death in 1929, becoming Father of the House in 1918. It was the only constituency outside the island of Ireland ever to return an Irish Nationalist Party MP, and O'Connor continued to be re-elected in Liverpool under this label unopposed, despite Ireland declaring independence in 1919. He was succeeded by the winner of the by-election, David Logan, who served for a further 35 years until his own death in 1964; Logan was never Father of the House, but he was its oldest sitting member from 1950 until his death.

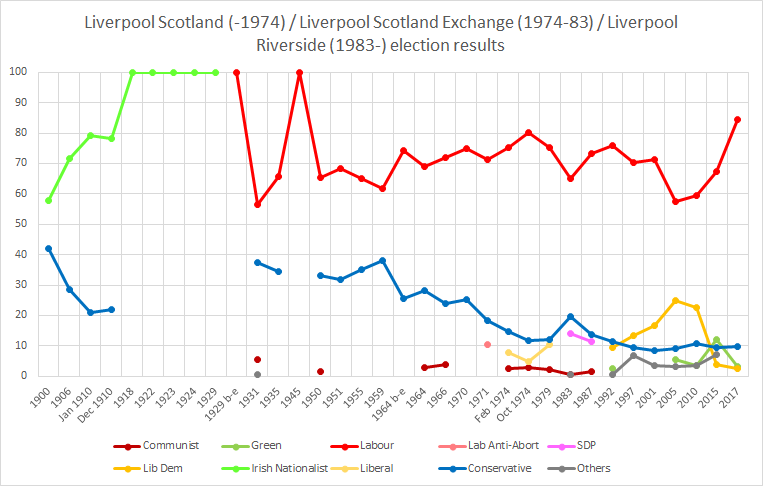
Liverpool Scotland / Riverside election results

== Boundaries ==
1885–1918: The Municipal Borough of Liverpool ward of Scotland.

1918–1950: The County Borough of Liverpool wards of North Scotland, Sandhills, and South Scotland, and part of Vauxhall ward.

1950–1955: The County Borough of Liverpool wards of Everton, Netherfield, North Scotland, St Domingo, Sandhills, and South Scotland.

1955–1974: The County Borough of Liverpool wards of Everton, Netherfield, St Domingo, Sandhills, and Vauxhall.

== Election results ==
=== Elections in the 1880s ===
General election 1885: Liverpool Scotland
Party	Candidate	Votes	%	±%
Irish Nationalist	T. P. O'Connor	2,724	64.9	
Ind. Conservative	Mortimer Neville Woodard	1,474	35.1	
Majority		1,250	29.8	
Turnout		4,198	59.3	
Registered electors		7,076		
Irish Nationalist win (new seat)				

General election 1886: Liverpool Scotland
Party	Candidate	Votes	%	±%
Irish Nationalist	T. P. O'Connor	2,911	67.0	+2.1
Liberal Unionist	Arthur Earle	1,431	33.0	―2.1
Majority		1,480	34.0	+4.2
Turnout		4,342	61.4	+2.1
Registered electors		7,076		
Irish Nationalist hold		Swing	+2.1	

=== Elections in the 1890s ===
General election 1892: Liverpool Scotland
Party	Candidate	Votes	%	±%
Irish Nationalist	T. P. O'Connor	2,537	65.3	−1.7
Conservative	John Vesey Vesey-Fitzgerald	1,347	34.7	+1.7
Majority		1,190	30.6	−3.4
Turnout		3,884	63.5	+2.1
Registered electors		6,121		
Irish Nationalist hold		Swing	−1.7	

General election 1895: Liverpool Scotland
Party	Candidate	Votes	%	±%
Irish Nationalist	T. P. O'Connor	2,089	59.0	−6.3
Conservative	William Ellison-Macartney	1,452	41.0	+6.3
Majority		637	18.0	−12.6
Turnout		3,541	61.3	−2.2
Registered electors		5,780		
Irish Nationalist hold		Swing	−6.3	

=== Elections in the 1900s ===
General election 1900: Liverpool Scotland
Party	Candidate	Votes	%	±%
Irish Nationalist	T. P. O'Connor	2,044	57.9	−1.1
Conservative	William Rutherford	1,484	42.1	+1.1
Majority		560	15.8	−2.2
Turnout		3,528	60.2	−1.1
Registered electors		5,859		
Irish Nationalist hold		Swing	−1.1	

General election 1906: Liverpool Scotland
Party	Candidate	Votes	%	±%
Irish Nationalist	T. P. O'Connor	2,808	71.5	+13.6
Conservative	Alfred Tobin	1,117	28.5	−13.6
Majority		1,691	43.0	+27.2
Turnout		3,925	68.1	+7.9
Registered electors		5,761		
Irish Nationalist hold		Swing	+13.6	

=== Elections in the 1910s ===
General election January 1910: Liverpool Scotland
Party	Candidate	Votes	%	±%
Irish Nationalist	T. P. O'Connor	2,943	79.1	+7.6
Conservative	Arthur Moy	776	20.9	−7.6
Majority		2,167	58.2	+15.2
Turnout		3,719	69.8	+1.7
Irish Nationalist hold		Swing	+7.6	

General election December 1910: Liverpool Scotland
Party	Candidate	Votes	%	±%
Irish Nationalist	T. P. O'Connor	2,458	78.1	−1.0
Conservative	Thomas Oswald Ockleston	689	21.9	+1.0
Majority		1,769	56.2	−2.0
Turnout		3,147	59.1	−10.7
Irish Nationalist hold		Swing	−1.0	

General election 1918: Liverpool Scotland
Party	Candidate	Votes	%	±%
Irish Nationalist	T. P. O'Connor	Unopposed		
Irish Nationalist hold				

=== Elections in the 1920s ===
General election 1922: Liverpool Scotland
Party	Candidate	Votes	%	±%
Irish Nationalist	T. P. O'Connor	Unopposed		
Irish Nationalist hold				

General election 1923: Liverpool Scotland
Party	Candidate	Votes	%	±%
Irish Nationalist	T. P. O'Connor	Unopposed		
Irish Nationalist hold				

General election 1924: Liverpool Scotland
Party	Candidate	Votes	%	±%
Irish Nationalist	T. P. O'Connor	Unopposed		
Irish Nationalist hold				

General election 1929: Liverpool Scotland
Party	Candidate	Votes	%	±%
Irish Nationalist	T. P. O'Connor	Unopposed		
Irish Nationalist hold				

By-Election 1929: Liverpool Scotland
Party	Candidate	Votes	%	±%
Labour	David Logan	Unopposed		
Labour gain from Irish Nationalist				

=== Elections in the 1930s ===
General election 1931: Liverpool Scotland
Party	Candidate	Votes	%	±%
Labour	David Logan	15,521	56.5	N/A
Conservative	Eric Errington	10,280	37.5	New
Communist	Leo J. McGree	1,544	5.6	New
Independent	F. Abraham	99	0.4	New
Majority		5,241	19.0	N/A
Turnout		27,444	68.7	N/A
Labour hold		Swing	N/A	

General election 1935: Liverpool Scotland
Party	Candidate	Votes	%	±%
Labour	David Logan	16,036	65.7	+9.2
Conservative	Leo Henry Wright	8,372	34.3	−3.2
Majority		7,664	31.4	+12.4
Turnout		24,408	64.1	−4.6
Labour hold		Swing		

=== Elections in the 1940s ===
General election 1945: Liverpool Scotland
Party	Candidate	Votes	%	±%
Labour	David Logan	Unopposed	N/A	N/A
Labour hold				

This was the last occasion in the United Kingdom when a seat saw a walkover at a general election outside Northern Ireland and not as a result of a by-election; the other being Rhondda West. Both seats returned a Labour MP unopposed in the 1945 general election.

=== Elections in the 1950s ===
General election 1950: Liverpool Scotland
Party	Candidate	Votes	%	±%
Labour	David Logan	28,087	65.4	N/A
Conservative	John Woollam	14,240	33.2	New
Communist	Jack Coward	615	1.4	New
Majority		13,847	32.2	N/A
Turnout		42,942	74.8	N/A
Labour hold		Swing	N/A	

General election 1951: Liverpool Scotland
Party	Candidate	Votes	%	±%
Labour	David Logan	28,558	68.2	+2.8
Conservative	Norman Pannell	13,344	31.9	―1.3
Majority		15,214	36.3	+4.1
Turnout		41,902	71.1	―3.7
Labour hold		Swing		

General election 1955: Liverpool Scotland
Party	Candidate	Votes	%	±%
Labour	David Logan	21,928	65.0	―3.2
Conservative	George F. Allanson	11,821	35.0	+3.1
Majority		10,107	30.0	―6.3
Turnout		33,749	60.1	―11.0
Labour hold		Swing	―3.2	

General election 1959: Liverpool Scotland
Party	Candidate	Votes	%	±%
Labour	David Logan	20,051	61.8	―3.2
Conservative	James F. Bradley	12,384	38.2	+3.2
Majority		7,667	23.6	―6.4
Turnout		32,435	62.5	+2.4
Labour hold		Swing	―3.2	

=== Elections in the 1960s ===
By-Election 1964: Liverpool Scotland
Party	Candidate	Votes	%	±%
Labour	Walter Alldritt	13,558	74.3	+12.5
Conservative	Brian Mervyn Keefe	4,684	25.7	―12.5
Majority		8,874	48.6	+25.0
Turnout		18,242		
Labour hold		Swing	+12.5	

General election 1964: Liverpool Scotland
Party	Candidate	Votes	%	±%
Labour	Walter Alldritt	17,984	68.9	+7.1
Conservative	Brian Mervyn Keefe	7,393	28.3	―9.9
Communist	Thomas E. Cassin	725	2.8	New
Majority		10,591	40.6	+17.0
Turnout		26,102	59.6	―2.9
Labour hold		Swing	+8.5	

General election 1966: Liverpool Scotland
Party	Candidate	Votes	%	±%
Labour	Walter Alldritt	14,244	72.1	+3.2
Conservative	Ralph H. Morris	4,730	24.0	―4.3
Communist	Thomas E. Cassin	779	3.9	+1.1
Majority		9,514	48.1	+7.5
Turnout		19,753	51.7	―7.9
Labour hold		Swing	+3.8	

=== Elections in the 1970s ===
General election 1970: Liverpool Scotland
Party	Candidate	Votes	%	±%
Labour	Walter Alldritt	11,074	74.8	+2.7
Conservative	Ralph H. Morris	3,740	25.3	+1.3
Majority		7,334	49.5	+1.4
Turnout		14,814	50.7	―1.0
Labour hold		Swing	+0.7	

By-Election 1971: Liverpool Scotland
Party	Candidate	Votes	%	±%
Labour	Frank Marsden	6,795	71.3	―3.5
Conservative	Barry Porter	1,751	18.4	―6.9
Labour and Anti-Abortion	Peter Mahon	981	10.3	New
Majority		5,044	52.9	+3.4
Turnout		9,527		
Labour hold		Swing		

== Sources ==
- Election results, 1950 - 1970
- F. W. S. Craig, British Parliamentary Election Results 1918 - 1949
- F. W. S. Craig, British Parliamentary Election Results 1885 - 1918
- Leigh Rayment's Historical List of MPs – Constituencies beginning with "S" (part 2)
