= Walter Alldritt =

British politician

Walter Harold Alldritt (4 July 1918 – 27 July 1990) was a British Labour politician.

Alldritt was educated at St Francis de Sales Catholic Junior School, and the University of Liverpool. He served in the Armed Forces during World War II, then became a trade union official. From 1955 to 1967, he represented the Sandhills ward on Liverpool City Council. He also served as president of the Liverpool Labour Party and Trades Council, at the time, the youngest person to have held the post.

He was elected as Member of Parliament (MP) for Liverpool Scotland at a by-election in 1964, and held the seat until his resignation from the House of Commons in 1971.

In 1970, Alldritt was appointed as regional secretary of the National Union of General and Municipal Workers for Liverpool, North Wales and Northern Ireland, serving until 1981.

== Sources ==
- Leigh Rayment's Historical List of MPs

Parliament of the United Kingdom
Preceded by David Logan	Member of Parliament for Liverpool Scotland; 1964–1971	Succeeded by Frank Marsden
