= Louise Ellman =

British Labour politician

Dame Louise Ellman DBE
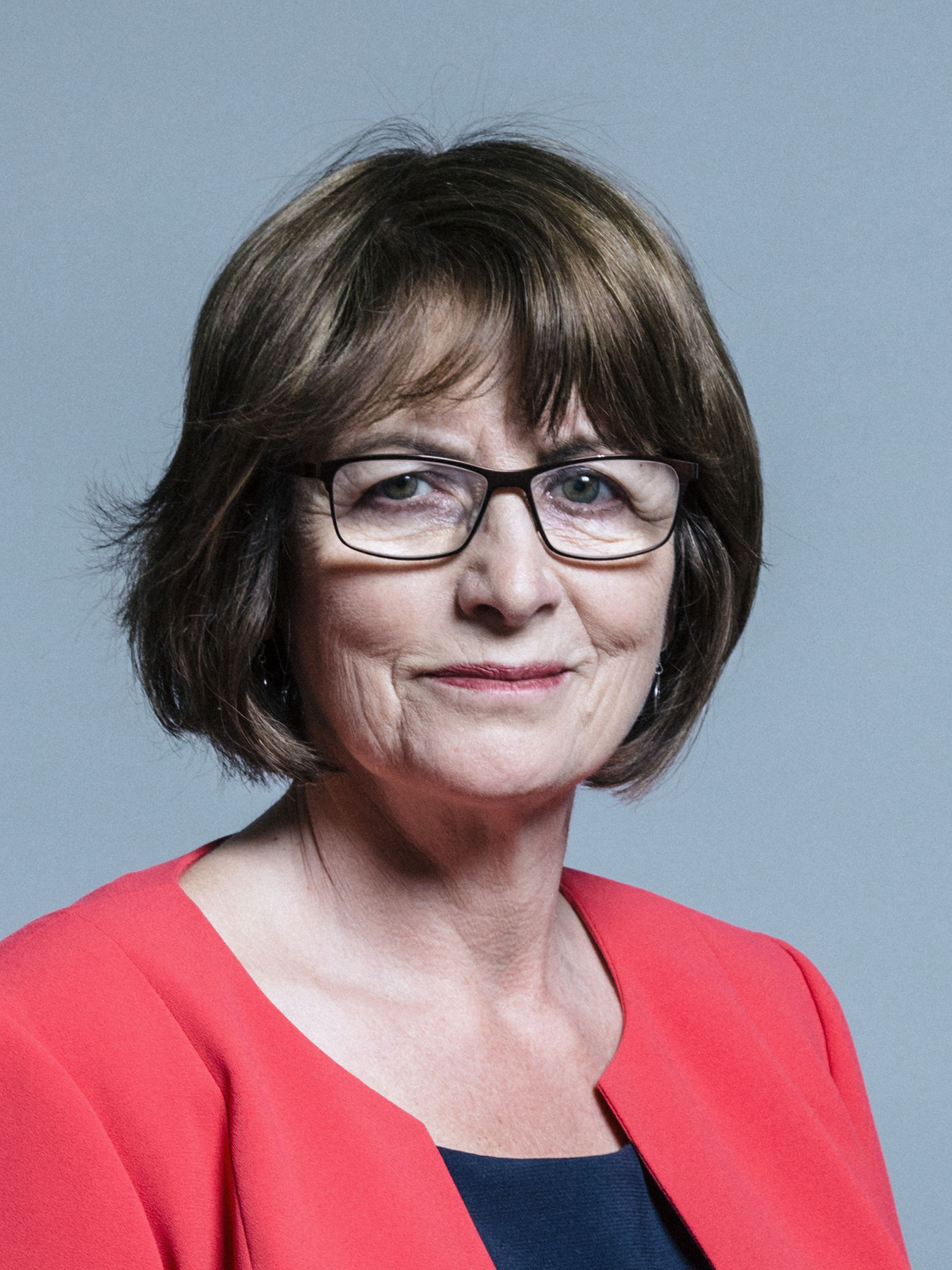
- Official portrait, 2017

Member of Parliament for Liverpool Riverside
- In office 1 May 1997 – 12 December 2019
- Preceded by: Robert Parry
- Succeeded by: Kim Johnson

Chair of the Transport Committee
- In office 21 May 2008 – 12 July 2017
- Preceded by: Gwyneth Dunwoody
- Succeeded by: Lilian Greenwood

Leader of Lancashire County Council
- In office 1981–1997
- Preceded by: Leonard Broughton
- Succeeded by: John West

Member of Lancashire County Council
- In office 5 May 1970 – 1 May 1997
- Ward: Skelmersdale and Holland No. 2 (1970–1981); Skelmersdale Central (1981–1997)

Personal details
- Born: Louise Joyce Rosenberg; 14 November 1945 (age 80) Manchester, Lancashire, England
- Party: Labour Co-op (Note: Resigned from Labour in 2019 and rejoined in 2021.)
- Education: Manchester High School for Girls
- Alma mater: University of Hull (BA); University of York (MPhil)

Dame Louise Joyce Ellman DBE (née Rosenberg; born 14 November 1945) is a British politician who served as Member of Parliament (MP) for Liverpool Riverside from 1997 to 2019. She is a member of the Labour Party.

Ellman was elected as a councillor on Lancashire County Council in 1970, becoming the Labour group leader in 1977 and serving as leader of the council from 1981 until her election to the House of Commons in 1997. She was Vice-Chair of Lancashire Enterprises and chaired the Transport Select Committee from 2008 to 2017.

Ellman has been actively involved in Jewish and pro-Israel organizations. She served as Chair of Labour Friends of Israel until February 2020 and was Honorary President of the Jewish Labour Movement. In 2016, she was appointed a Vice President of the Jewish Leadership Council. In October 2019, she resigned from the Labour Party over concerns about antisemitism in the party and a potential Jeremy Corbyn-led government but rejoined in 2021.

In recognition of her public service, she was appointed a Dame Commander of the Order of the British Empire (DBE) in the 2018 Queen's Birthday Honours List.

== Early life and career ==
Louise Joyce Rosenberg was born in Manchester to an observant Jewish family. Her father had a Lithuanian background. She was educated at the independent Manchester High School for Girls, before studying at the University of Hull where she received a BA in Sociology and History in 1967, and then studied Social Administration at the University of York where she was awarded a MPhil in 1972.

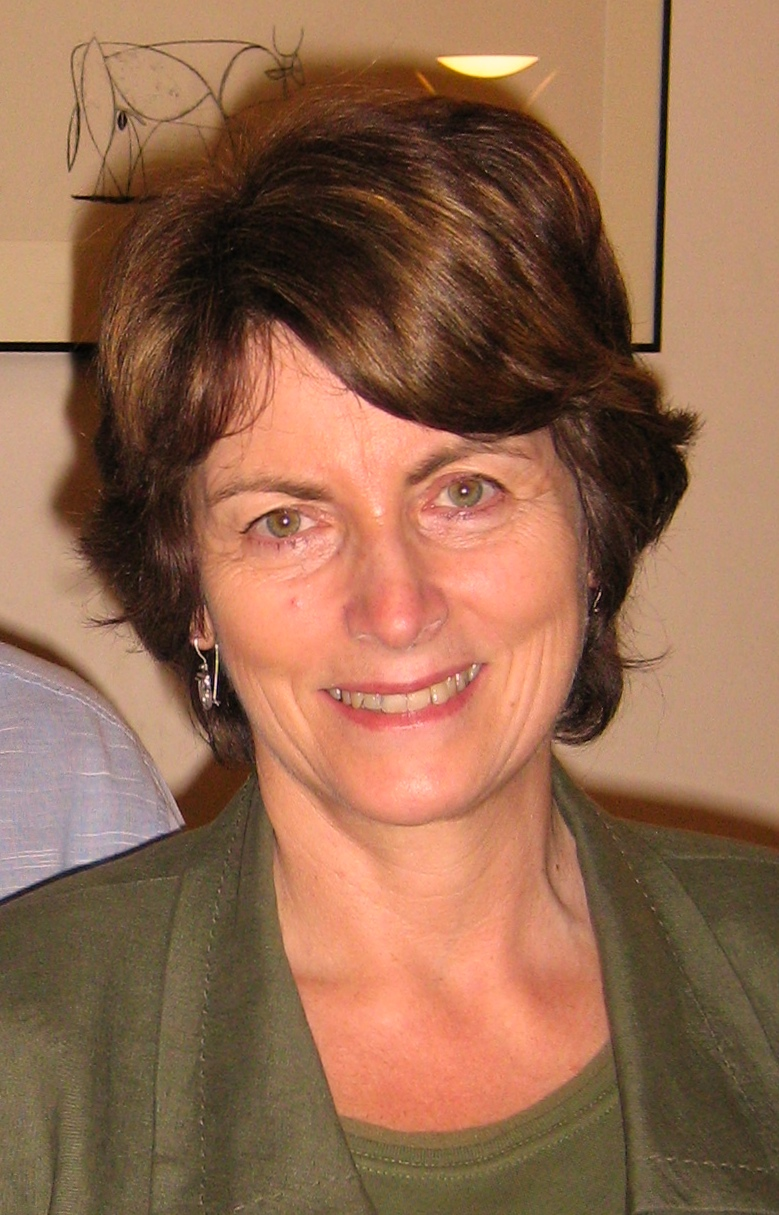
Ellman in 2007

As a teenager, she was involved in the Labour Zionist movement, Habonim and, following university, spent a year in Israel at an Ulpan studying Hebrew, where she met her husband. From 1970 to 1976, she was worked in further education and at the Open University.

She was elected as a councillor on the Lancashire County Council in 1970, becoming the Labour group leader in 1977 and council leader from 1981 until her election to Parliament. She was Vice-Chair of Lancashire Enterprises.

She unsuccessfully contested the Darwen constituency at the 1979 general election.

== Parliamentary career ==
She was elected to Parliament at the 1997 general election for the safe seat of Liverpool Riverside. She held the seat with a majority of 21,799 and has held the seat comfortably at successive general elections. When she was re-elected in 2001, the turnout was the lowest in the country at 34.1%.

=== Positions and voting ===
She was a member of the Transport Committee and its predecessor, Transport, Local Government and the Regions, since she was first elected. On 21 May 2008, she was selected to become the Chair of the Commons Transport Select Committee after the death of Gwyneth Dunwoody MP, being returned unopposed after the 2015 general election.

According to website Public Whip, Ellman repeatedly voted for the Iraq War, against an investigation into that war, and for renewal of Trident, Britain's nuclear weapons programme. She very rarely voted against the Party line.

In the 2015 Labour Party leadership election, she nominated Liz Kendall.

She supported Owen Smith in the failed attempt to replace Jeremy Corbyn in the 2016 leadership election.

=== Israel ===
Ellman was Chair of the Jewish Labour Movement from 2006 to 2016, after which she became its Honorary President. She was also Vice Chair of Labour Friends of Israel and succeeded Joan Ryan as Chair in August 2019. She said that she intended to remain a member of LFI following her resignation from the Labour Party. She was the chair of the All-Party Britain-Israel Parliamentary Group.

The Times of Israel called her "tough-as-nails" and "an unabashed friend of Israel". According to one biographer in the Jewish Chronicle, "Ellman can always be called on to defend Israel on the green benches" (i.e. in Parliament). The Jewish Telegraph said "Doughty Labour MP Louise Ellman is never scared to openly proclaim her Jewish identity and fight for Israel and against Islamic extremism at every Parliamentary opportunity". In September 2019, Ellman said she "shared the fears" of other Jews living in the UK about the prospect of a Labour government led by Jeremy Corbyn and understood why they "would seriously consider leaving the country". In October 2019, she said "I'm not absolutely convinced he will bring great danger to the Jewish community but I'm very concerned it is possible he could".

=== Constituency party ===
In 2016, Ellman said that a small number among the members who joined her constituency Labour party after Corbyn's election as leader seemed "obsessed on Middle East issues", that there had been a "very unpleasant atmosphere" in constituency meetings and that remarks which she considered were antisemitic had been made to her. She also alleged that the local Momentum group was acting as a "party within a party" and asked for her constituency party to be suspended and investigated. A leading local Momentum member rejected the allegations.

=== 2019 resignation from Labour Party ===
In early October 2019, a motion of no confidence in Ellman, scheduled to take place on Yom Kippur, the holiest day of the Jewish calendar, was submitted for discussion at a branch of her constituency Labour Party. The timing of the motion was criticised by Ellman herself, who called it "particularly insidious"; and by Marie van der Zyl, President of the Board of Deputies of British Jews, who said it meant that Ellman would have "no opportunity even to respond". A Labour Party spokesperson said that no confidence motions "had no formal standing", with another source intimating that the motion was unlikely to be taken to a vote. Two further motions of no confidence were later submitted for debate at other branches of the Liverpool Riverside CLP. The North-West Labour Party office later advised local branches that none of the motions should be discussed, citing the potential prejudicial effect that such discussion may have on the upcoming trigger ballot.

On 16 October 2019, Ellman resigned from the Labour Party, citing concerns that antisemitism had grown under Jeremy Corbyn’s leadership. She believed Jewish members faced bullying and abuse, while antisemitic views and conspiracy theories had spread. She also accused Corbyn of associating with antisemites and failing to challenge them. Labour responded by stating that both Corbyn and the party were committed to supporting the Jewish community and tackling antisemitism. Ellman’s Constituency Labour Party acknowledged her long service but noted her opposition to a Corbyn-led government made reselection unlikely. They cited political disagreements, including her support for the Iraq War and criticism of Corbyn, as reasons for the contest. While condemning antisemitism, they argued she misrepresented the local party and said many Jewish members did not share her views.

Ellman did not stand for re-election as an MP at the 2019 United Kingdom general election.

== Life after parliament ==
On 27 September 2021, Ellman announced she was rejoining the Labour Party. She expressed her satisfaction with Keir Starmer's leadership, saying he has “shown a willingness to confront both the anti-Jewish racists and the toxic culture which allowed antisemitism to flourish” in the party.

== Personal life and recognition ==
Ellman has been married since 16 July 1967 to Geoffrey Ellman, a pharmacist. She lived in Leeds, then moved to Skelmersdale in 1969. The couple have a son, Sean, and a daughter, Yvonne, and five grandchildren. (Her son Sean has repeatedly come to public attention for selling so-called 'legal highs' in his chain of 'head shops' across the northwest of England. In 2010 he was given an ASBO by a St Helens court to prevent such sales; in 2012 he was taken to court by authorities in Chester. Two years after his judge-directed acquittal on a legal technicality, the Sunday People newspaper exposed two more Ellman head shops in Manchester and Leeds, one for allegedly selling "synthetic cocaine".)

She was made a Dame Commander of the Order of the British Empire (DBE) in the 2018 Queen's Birthday Honours for parliamentary and political services.

In 2019, the Jerusalem Post ranked her as the 23rd most influential Jew worldwide, calling her 'Labour's lady who opposes Corbyn' and noting that 'she has been a strong advocate for Israel in the House of Commons'. She was the sole Briton on the 50-strong list.

She is a Vice President of the Jewish Leadership Council.

== Notes ==
Parliament of the United Kingdom
Preceded by Robert Parry	Member of Parliament for Liverpool Riverside; 1997–2019	Succeeded by Kim Johnson
