= 1971 Liverpool Scotland by-election =

UK parliamentary by-election

The 1971 Liverpool Scotland by-election of 1 April 1971 was held after Labour Member of Parliament (MP) Walter Alldritt, resigned from the House of Commons. The seat was retained by Labour.

== Result ==
Liverpool Scotland By-election, 1971
Party	Candidate	Votes	%	±%
Labour	Frank Marsden	6,795	71.32	−3.43
Conservative	Barry Porter	1,751	18.38	−6.87
Labour and Anti-Abortion	Peter Mahon	981	10.30	New
Majority		5,044	52.94	+3.43
Turnout		9,527		
Labour hold		Swing		

== Previous result ==
General election 1970: Liverpool Scotland
Party	Candidate	Votes	%	±%
Labour	Walter Alldritt	11,074	74.75	
Conservative	RH Morris	3,740	25.25	
Majority		7,334	49.50	
Turnout		14,814	50.71	
Labour hold		Swing		
