= Liverpool Scotland Exchange =

UK Parliament constituency (1974–1983)

- Former borough constituency for the House of Commons
- Liverpool Scotland Exchange in Lancashire, showing boundaries used from 1974-1983

1974–1983
- Created from: Liverpool Exchange and Liverpool Scotland
- Replaced by: Liverpool Riverside

Liverpool Scotland Exchange was a borough constituency within the city and metropolitan borough of Liverpool, in the English county of Merseyside. It elected one Member of Parliament (MP) by the first past the post system of election.

== Boundaries ==
The County Borough of Liverpool wards of Abercromby, Central, Everton, Netherfield, St James, Sandhills, and Vauxhall.

The constituency was formed in 1974 from Liverpool Exchange and Liverpool Scotland. It was partially replaced by the new Liverpool Riverside constituency for the 1983 election.

== Members of Parliament ==
Election	Member	Party
Feb 1974	Robert Parry	Labour
1983	constituency abolished: see Liverpool Riverside	

== Elections ==
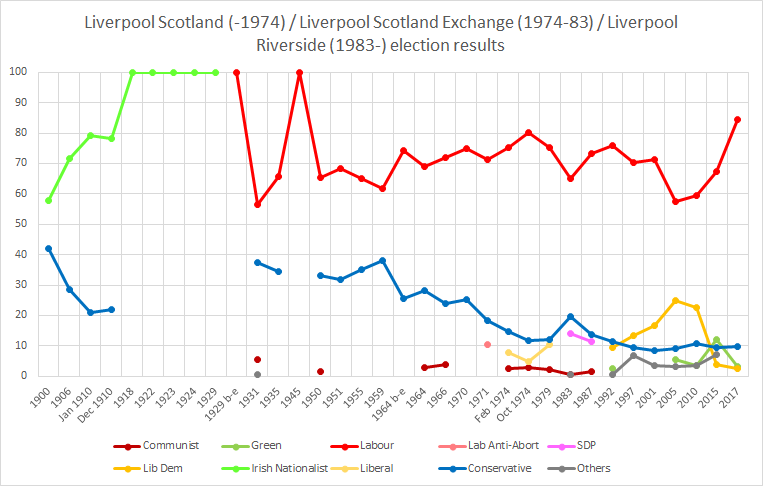
Liverpool Scotland / Riverside election results

General election February 1974: Liverpool Scotland Exchange
Party	Candidate	Votes	%	±%
Labour	Robert Parry	15,295	75.1	
Conservative	Ralph Stuart Charles	2,963	14.6	
Liberal	David Loughlin Mahon	1,596	7.8	
Communist	Roger O'Hara	505	2.5	
Majority		12,332	60.5	
Turnout		20,359	58.5	
Labour win (new seat)				

General election October 1974: Liverpool Scotland Exchange
Party	Candidate	Votes	%	±%
Labour	Robert Parry	15,154	80.2	+5.1
Conservative	Philip Simon Corderoy Rankin (Note: Rankin was not included on Conservative Central Office's official list of Conservative candidates for the election. However, Harold Steward, the chair of the Liverpool Conservative Association, recommended that Conservatives in the constituency support Rankin.)	2,234	11.8	―2.8
Liberal	Penny Crockett	944	5.0	―2.8
Communist	Roger O'Hara	556	2.9	+0.4
Majority		12,920	68.6	+8.1
Turnout		18,888	53.7	―4.8
Labour hold		Swing	+4.0	

General election 1979: Liverpool Scotland Exchange
Party	Candidate	Votes	%	±%
Labour	Robert Parry	13,920	75.1	―5.1
Conservative	John Richard Murray Bligh	2,264	12.2	+0.4
Liberal	Chris Davies	1,939	10.5	+5.5
Communist	Roger O'Hara	421	2.3	―0.6
Majority		11,656	62.9	―5.7
Turnout		18,544	57.4	+3.7
Labour hold		Swing	―2.8	
