= Robert Parry (politician) =

British politician

Robert Parry (8 January 1933 – 9 March 2000) was a British Labour Party politician who was Member of Parliament in Liverpool for 27 years.

In 1963, he was elected to Liverpool City Council for the Central ward, one of the safest Labour wards in Liverpool. Parry was elected to Parliament at the 1970 election for Liverpool Exchange and served until his retirement in 1997, from 1974 in Liverpool Scotland Exchange, then from 1983 for Liverpool Riverside. He retired from Parliament at the 1997 general election.

He was known as a hard-line left-winger who opposed any policy moves which he saw as edging Labour away from pure socialism. He once branded Neil Kinnock a "traitor" over the latter's denunciation of the Militant tendency activists who dominated local government on Merseyside. In 1992, Parry was arrested in Beijing when he and his colleagues unfurled a banner in Tiananmen Square protesting the shootings which had taken place there in 1989.

Parry died on 9 March 2000 after battling diabetes.

Parliament of the United Kingdom
Preceded by Bessie Braddock	Member of Parliament for Liverpool Exchange; 1970–February 1974	Constituency abolished
New constituency	Member of Parliament for Liverpool Scotland Exchange; February 1974–1983	Constituency abolished
New constituency	Member of Parliament for Liverpool Riverside; 1983–1997	Succeeded by Louise Ellman
