= Royal Naval House =

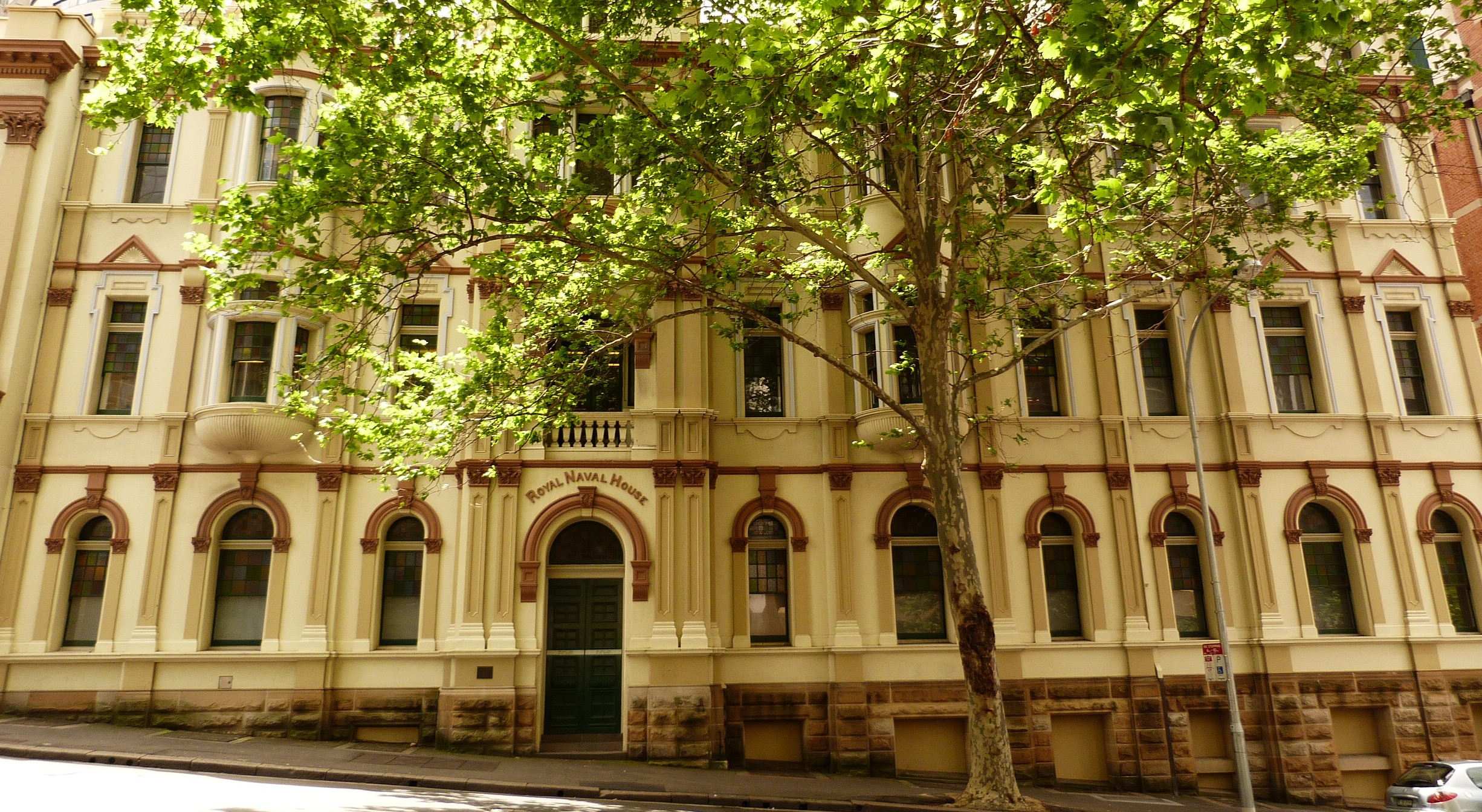
- Royal Naval House, pictured in 2010

- Location within Sydney Location within Australia
- 33.8632°S 151.2069°E
- Location: 32–34 Grosvenor Street, The Rocks, City of Sydney, New South Wales, Australia

History
- Built: 1890–1907

Site notes
- Architects: Varney Parkes; G. W. Landers
- Architectural style: Federation Free Classical
- Owner: Property NSW

New South Wales Heritage Register
- Official name: Royal Naval House; currently Futures Exchange
- Type: State heritage (built)
- Designated: 10 May 2002
- Reference no.: 1574
- Type: Defence Base Naval
- Category: Defence

The Royal Naval House is a heritage-listed former Royal Australian Navy amenities and accommodation building and now commercial building located at 32–34 Grosvenor Street in the inner city Sydney suburb of The Rocks in the City of Sydney local government area of New South Wales, Australia. It was designed by Varney Parkes and G. W. Landers and built from 1890 to 1907. It is currently known as the Sydney Futures Exchange. The property is owned by Property NSW, an agency of the Government of New South Wales. It was added to the New South Wales State Heritage Register on 10 May 2002.

== History ==
The land that Royal Naval House stands on was once part of the western limit of the first Parade Ground of the Colony.

Grosvenor Street was originally called Charlotte Place, named after Charlotte Sophia the wife of King George III. In 1897 the name of the street was changed to Grosvenor, after the nearby Grosvenor Hotel (demolished in 1923) and itself named after the Grosvenor family. The renaming was very unpopular at the time.

Earliest claimants to the site were William Davis and children of the late Robert and Anne Howe, grandchildren to George Howe, Government Printer and founder of Sydney's first newspaper, the Sydney Gazette. Fowles streetscapes from "Sydney in 1848" show substantial two storey houses along the site, these remained essentially unaltered until their demolition for Royal Naval House in 1889 and the other in 1907 for the later wing. By 1845 the Howe portion of the site was owned by Flower, Salting & Co and by 1849 by John Cleeve. Cleeve also owned the adjacent eastern block and remained in possession until c. 1887. The 1890 section of Royal Naval House occupies the section of the site originally owned by William Davis, who was instrumental in helping the Catholic Church establish itself in NSW.

John Samuel Shearston (1853-1916) was instrumental in the establishment of the Church of England Mission to Seamen in 1881, and his home a 3 Princes Street, Dawes Point was its headquarters. In 1885 he moved to larger premises at 9 Princes Street, renamed Trafalgar House, where they were also able to offer some residential accommodation. At the end of 1886, at its Committee's request, he agreed to also act as Superintendent of Goodenough Royal Naval House at 39 Princes Street, which he ran in conjunction with Trafalgar House. Despite this both places could not cope with the demand for accommodation and a public subscription was taken up to construct Royal Naval House in Grosvenor Street. Lord Carrington officially opened Royal Naval House in 1890. The land cost £9,000, the building £14,000, which was later extended, and the furnishings £1,200.

Shearston resigned as Missioner to become Superintendent of Royal Naval House in September 1890. Mrs Shearston acted as housekeeper. The men, grateful for their warm welcome, soon referred to the premises as 'Johnny's', the name used by seamen until it closed in 1970. It was popular immediately and a newspaper report from the Sydney Mail, 21 August 1897 reported that in the last financial year the building had accommodated 25,789 men and in the seven years it had been opened 164,502 men had lodged there. Besides sleeping accommodation the building in 1897 also housed reading rooms dining rooms, billiard rooms and a gymnasium. By the end of the 19th century it was obvious that the building was too small.

In 1904 the Government bought the adjacent site for the Trustees of Royal Naval House. The house illustrated in Fowles in 1848 remained essentially unchanged until demolition occurred for the erection of the 1907 wing of Royal Naval House. Evidence from Public Works Department indicates that the 1907 wing was built by the Government Architect's office.

The Evening News of May 1912 reported that Royal Naval House had lodged 67,408 men in the last year, prior to the erection of the 1907 wing. Another 12,000 men used the House annually since the new section opened, averaging 216 men a night. At its busiest during World War II (1939-1945) Royal Naval House was accommodating almost 1500 men a night, many in "shakedowns" mattresses and bunks placed wherever there was room. In 1946 alone it lodged 307,000 sailors. Royal Naval House was used by naval personnel and in the 1960s by their families for temporary accommodation until it closed in 1970 and the Sydney Cove Redevelopment Authority took possession of the building in 1976.

From 1980 negotiations proceeded with the private sector on proposals for mixed development and recycling on the land bounded by George, Grosvenor, Harrington and Essex Streets, known as Sites D5, D6 and D11. The agreement was signed for the Grosvenor Place project in June, 1983 involving the renovation of Royal Naval House and four adjacent buildings. Work on Grosvenor Place commenced in 1984 and was completed in 1988. In 1987, work commenced on the $12.5 million reconstruction and renovation of Royal Naval House and Federation Hall in Grosvenor Street to enable the buildings to house the Sydney Futures Exchange. The work involved the reinstatement of the original verandah and courtyard in a new location, and the restoration of the street facades. The reconstruction and renovation of the three remaining historic buildings on the site was carried out in 1989 for use as bars and restaurant.

== Description ==
Style: Federation Free Classical; Storeys: Lower ground floor, three floors, plus attic.

=== Modifications and dates ===
- 1939; 1945; 1952–1970
- Royal Naval House was built in 1889/90, designed by architect Varney Parkes, and added to by the Government Architect W L Vernon in 1907. Other interior modifications were carried out over the years, mainly post-1939.
- In 1987–88 the reconstruction and renovation of this building and Federation Hall was undertaken for the Sydney Futures Exchange, involving the reinstatement of the original verandah and courtyard in a new location within the building and the restoration of the street facades.

== Heritage listing ==
As at 31 March 2011, Royal Naval House and site are of State heritage significance for their historical and scientific cultural values. The site and building are also of State heritage significance for their contribution to The Rocks area which is of State Heritage significance in its own right.

Royal Naval House has associations with William Davis, who once owned the land. Commodore James Goodenough, RN, CB, CMG, the Commander of the Royal Navy's Australian Station in the late 19th century and John Shearston who were instrumental in establishing practical welfare for sailors when ashore. Shearston was the first superintendent of Royal Naval House and it was nicknamed "Johnnies" by sailors after him. Royal Naval House has social significance for thousands of Australian and British seamen who have lodged there in its more than 80 years of existence.

As a group, the buildings (Federation Hall, Royal Naval House, Johnson's Building, 231 George Street and Brooklyn Hotel) have considerable significance. All facades contribute to the overall richness of the group, with Royal Naval House the focal point and the Johnson's Building leading nicely around the corner to a "coda" of two small but heavily textured facades which seem to be a logical end to the whole. The trees, which are deciduous, give an added quality to the richness of the facades and have considerable significance. The facades as a group have important landmark qualities with their location on the north-west corner of a major intersection, providing an entry point to The Rocks.

The original facade of the Royal Naval House is a well-designed, rich and vigorous piece of architecture of the period, and the 1907 extension is well integrated with the original. A stucco facade of this richness is fairly rare in Sydney. The Stair Hall is distinguished more for its scale and boldness than its elegance, but nevertheless, it is well done and appropriate to the rest of the building. The other interior spaces are designed either as reading rooms or dormitories. As such, they are large open spaces with simple detailing, and therein is their virtue. The courtyard in the original form is a unique, appealing and intriguing space. It is almost as though Varney Parkes had designed a four-storey building with a verandah on the back, accessed by French doors, and then had been told to add a Dining Hall etc. on an awkward site. The solution admits lots of sunlight to the main building (considering the height) and soaks up the odd shape on the North-West corner.

High Significance Fabric: The Grosvenor Street facade and a considerable part of the return along Milson Lane, at least as far as the south wall of the courtyard. The interior spaces of the 1890 building (stair hall, full height). Courtyard including surrounding walls and verandahs. The roofscape. Medium Significance Fabric: Other rooms off Stair Hall on ground, first and second floors. Low Significance Fabric: Managers Quarters.

Royal Naval House was listed on the New South Wales State Heritage Register on 10 May 2002 having satisfied the following criteria.

The place is important in demonstrating the course, or pattern, of cultural or natural history in New South Wales.

Royal Naval House and site are of State heritage significance for their historical and scientific cultural values. The site and building are also of State heritage significance for their contribution to The Rocks area which is of State Heritage significance in its own right.

The Royal Naval House site has historical associations with William Davis, an Irish catholic transported for his part in the 1798 Rebellion, he was instrumental in helping the Catholic Church establish itself in Australia. Davis donated land for the first Catholic Church in Australia, St Patrick's in The Rocks, and also held services in his house, which was illegal.

The place has a strong or special association with a person, or group of persons, of importance of cultural or natural history of New South Wales's history.

Royal Naval House is associated with Commodore James Goodenough, RN, CB, CMG (1830-1875). Goodenough was commander in charge of the Royal Navy's Australian Station, he was well liked and had strong charitable interests, especially among seamen. After his death Goodenough House was established to provide accommodation for Royal Navy sailors whilst ashore, this establishment lead directly to the construction of Royal Naval House.

Royal Naval House is associated with John Samuel Shearston (1853-1916). Shearston was instrumental in the establishment of the Church of England Mission to Seamen in 1881, and his home a 3 Princes St, Dawes Point was its headquarters. In 1885 he moved to larger premises at 9 Princes Street, renamed Trafalgar House, where they were also able to offer some residential accommodation. At the end of 1886, at its Committee's request, he agreed to also act as Superintendent of Goodenough Royal Naval House at 39 Princes Street, which he ran in conjunction with Trafalgar House. In 1889, Royal Naval House was erected and Shearston resigned as Missioner to become Superintendent of Royal Naval House in September 1890. Mrs Shearston acted as housekeeper. The men, grateful for their warm welcome, soon referred to the premises as 'Johnny's', by which they were known until closed in 1970.

The place is important in demonstrating aesthetic characteristics and/or a high degree of creative or technical achievement in New South Wales.

As a group, the buildings (Federation Hall, Royal Naval House, Johnson's Building, 231 George Street & Brooklyn Hotel) have considerable significance. All facades contribute to the overall richness of the group, with Royal Naval House the focal point and the Johnson's Building leading nicely around the corner to a "coda" of two small but heavily textured facades which seem to be a logical end to the whole. The trees, which are deciduous, give an added quality to the richness of the facades and have considerable significance. The facades as a group have important landmark qualities with their location on the north-west corner of a major intersection, providing an entry point to The Rocks.

The place has a strong or special association with a particular community or cultural group in New South Wales for social, cultural or spiritual reasons.

Royal Naval House has significant social value especially to the Royal Navy and the Royal Australian Navy. It provided accommodation and meals for thousands of seaman for 82 years, and was known as "Johnnies" after the first superintendent John Shearston. So well known was Royal Naval House that the term "hissing in the snakepit" entered Naval slang to refer to the wet canteen located in the quadrangle at the centre of the building. During World War II Royal Naval House was accommodating up to 1500 sailors a night from the Australian, British and other allied Navies. After World War II the building was also used for overnight accommodation for the families of low ranking seamen who could not afford city hotel rates.

Its social importance is demonstrated by articles that are still written about "Johnnies" in magazines and newspapers for those interested in nautical subjects such as "Afloat".

== See also ==
- Australian non-residential architectural styles
- Federation Hall
- Johnson's Building
