= Brooklyn Hotel, The Rocks =

Heritage-listed building in Sydney, Australia

Brooklyn Hotel
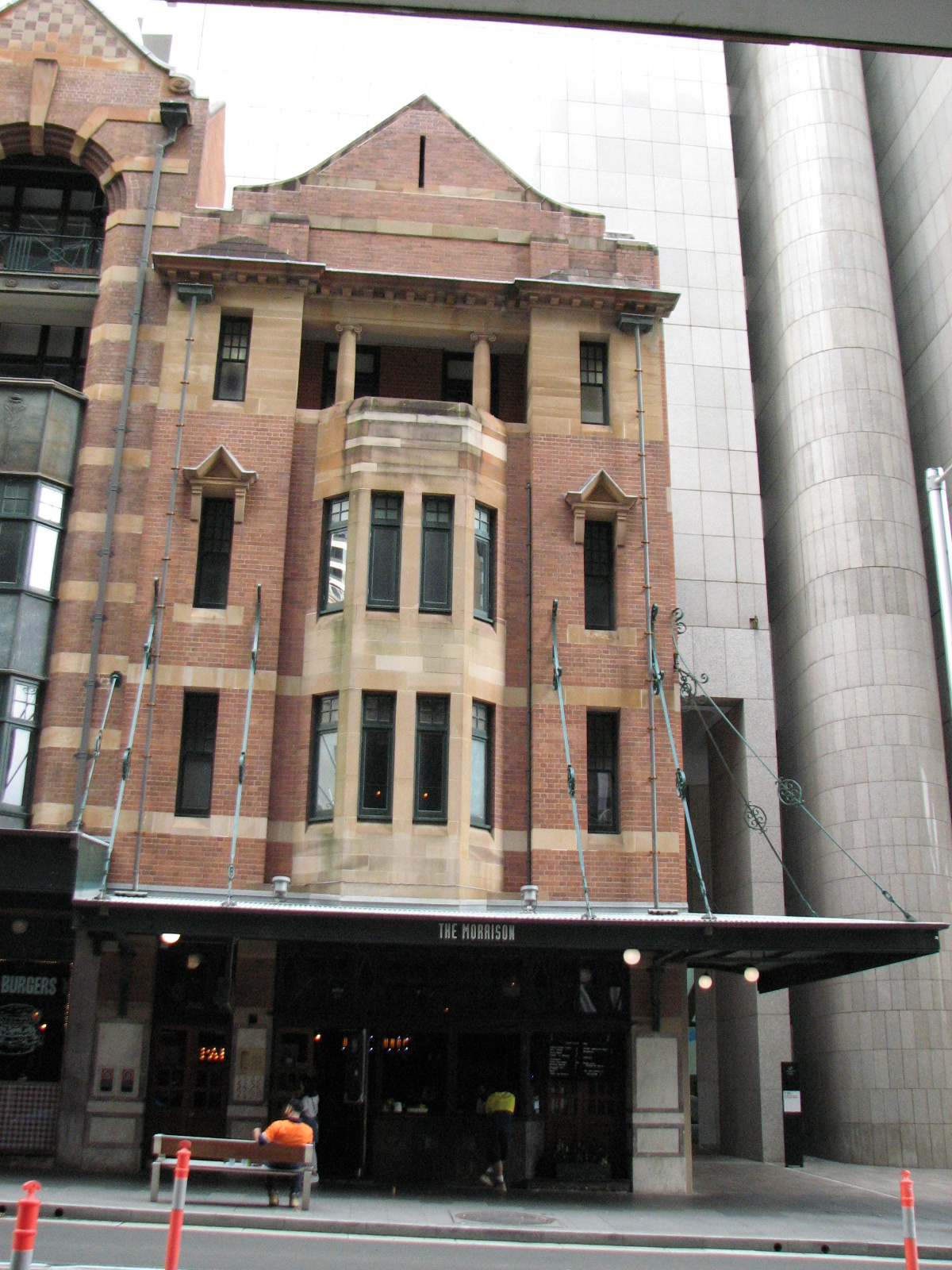
- Brooklyn Hotel (former) 229 George Street, The Rocks (Sydney)

- Location within Sydney Location within Australia
- 33.8630°S 151.2074°E
- Location: 229 George Street, The Rocks, City of Sydney, New South Wales, Australia

History
- Built: 1912

Site notes
- Architect: Walter Liberty Vernon
- Architectural style: Federation Free Style
- Owner: Property NSW

New South Wales Heritage Register
- Official name: Brooklyn Hotel
- Type: state heritage (built)
- Designated: 10 May 2002
- Reference no.: 1533
- Type: Hotel
- Category: Commercial

The Brooklyn Hotel is a heritage-listed bar, restaurant and former hotel located at 229 George Street, in the suburb of The Rocks, in the city of Sydney, New South Wales, Australia. It was designed by Walter Liberty Vernon and built in 1912. The property is owned by Property NSW, an agency of the Government of New South Wales. It was added to the New South Wales State Heritage Register on 10 May 2002.

== History ==
The Brooklyn Hotel site was once part of the original Parade Ground of the Colony. The land was claimed by Robert Howe on the basis of a land grant promised to his father George Howe by Governor Macquarie. George Howe was a convict who arrived in Sydney in 1800 and became government printer. In 1802 printed the first book in Australia, "New South Wales General Standing Orders, comprising Government and General Orders issued between 1791 and 1802". In 1803 he began the publication of the first newspaper, the Sydney Gazette and New South Wales Advertiser on the site.

In 1845, the "Printing Office" was owned by Flowers, Alding & Co. and the tenant was Stratham & Foster. By 1848 the original grant fronting George Street comprised 'Mr. Dawson's House', a passage and the first of a series of terraced shops and houses. The subdivision and the houses built upon it remained essentially unchanged until 1884. The passage and the house and shop to the north represent, approximately, the site of the present hotel. In the period 1882–84 these terraces were demolished and a new four storey Italianate building was erected. The first bay of this new building was a hotel, named sequentially: 1884–1888 – The Sydney and Melbourne Hotel; 1889–1897 – The Sydney Palace Hotel; 1898–1982 – The Brooklyn Hotel). In 1911 an application was lodged by T. Bennett with the City Council to demolish the Brooklyn Hotel, and in 1912 the current Brooklyn Hotel was erected at the same time as the Johnson's Building. It was designed by Walter Liberty Vernon, who had retired as New South Wales Government Architect.

From 1980 negotiations proceeded with the private sector on proposals for mixed development and recycling on the land bounded by George, Grosvenor, Harrington and Essex Streets, known as Sites D5, D6 and D11. The agreement for the Grosvenor Place project was signed in June, 1983 involving the renovation of Royal Naval House and four adjacent buildings, including the Brooklyn Hotel. Work on Grosvenor Place commenced in 1984 and was completed in 1988. In 1987, work commenced on the $12.5m reconstruction and renovation of Royal Naval House and Federation Hall in Grosvenor Street to enable the buildings to house the Sydney Futures Exchange. The reconstruction and renovation of the three remaining historic buildings on the site, including the Brooklyn Hotel, was carried out in 1989 for use as bars and a restaurant.

It operated as the Brooklyn Hotel for many years following the redevelopment, but closed in its hotel form following St George's Bank's foreclosure on owner and Woollahra publican John Chaina's hotels in November 2010. It reopened as a bar and restaurant, the "Morrison Bar and Oyster Room", in 2012.

== Description ==
This Edwardian building in Federation Free Style has a four-storey brick and sandstone facade featuring a central sandstone projecting bay on the first and second floors, with an open balcony above with small ionic columns. There are narrow multi-pane windows on each side of the bay and small pediments above those on the second floor. At the top there is a large simple brick pediment and dentilated eaves. The awning, part of the original design, is claimed to be one of the first of its type in Australia, being suspended over the footpath on iron rods.

Due to the extensive reconstruction of the building in 1989, only the façade remains of the original fabric.

== Heritage listing ==
The Brooklyn Hotel and site are of State heritage significance for their historical and scientific cultural values. The site and building are also of State heritage significance for their contribution to The Rocks area which is of State Heritage significance in its own right. The inclusion on the registers of the National Trust and National Estate demonstrate the esteem the building is held in by the wider community. The Brooklyn Hotel is of social significance to its regular clientele, mostly the office workers and tourists to the area, as a place to meet and relax. Its location, character, and continuity of service make it a recognisable feature in the area.

Part of a homogeneous and well detailed Edwardian streetscape without equal in Sydney. The work of NSW government architect Walter Liberty Vernon, assisted by William Moyes, who trained under Charles Rennie Macintosh in Glasgow. As such, this building has a direct link with one of the pioneers of Modern design.

As a group, the buildings (Federation Hall, Royal Naval House, Johnson's Building, 231 George Street and Brooklyn Hotel) have considerable significance. All facades contribute to the overall richness of the group, with Royal Naval House the focal point and the Johnson's Building leading nicely around the corner to a "coda" of two small but heavily textured facades which seem to be a logical end to the whole. The trees, which are deciduous, give an added quality to the richness of the facades and have considerable significance. The facades as a group have important landmark qualities with their location on the north-west corner of a major intersection, providing an entry point to The Rocks.

Brooklyn Hotel is significant for its facade and shopfront, which are typical of the period, with bay windows and a deep recessed verandah, the whole surmounted by a gable end with interesting stone trims. The top verandah is interesting in a picturesque manner flanked by two Ionic columns. The whole facade has high quality stone detailing. The awning forms an important part of this composition and the shopfront below, which is probably contemporary with the building, is unique. The interiors of the ground and first floor bars are significant and well designed for their purpose.

The Brooklyn Hotel site was once part of the original Parade Ground of the Colony and the site's changing use reflects the urban, economic and social development of the area from the very early days of the colony to the present. The redevelopment of the site in the late 20th century is a demonstration of the compromises that were made to accommodate new development.

Brooklyn Hotel was listed on the New South Wales State Heritage Register on 10 May 2002 having satisfied the following criteria.

The place is important in demonstrating the course, or pattern, of cultural or natural history in New South Wales.

The Brooklyn Hotel and site are of State heritage significance for their historical and scientific cultural values. The site and building are also of State heritage significance for their contribution to The Rocks area which is of State Heritage significance in its own right.

The Brooklyn Hotel site was once part of the original Parade Ground of the Colony and the site's changing use reflects the urban, economic and social development of the area from the very early days of the colony to the present. The redevelopment of the site in the late 20th century is a demonstration of the compromises that were made to accommodate new development.

The place has a strong or special association with a person, or group of persons, of importance of cultural or natural history of New South Wales's history.

Part of a homogeneous and well detailed Edwardian streetscape without equal in Sydney. The work of NSW government architect W L Vernon, assisted by William Moyes, who trained under Charles Rennie Macintosh in Glasgow. As such, this building has a direct link with one of the pioneers of Modern design.

The place is important in demonstrating aesthetic characteristics and/or a high degree of creative or technical achievement in New South Wales.

As a group, the buildings (Federation Hall, Royal Naval House, Johnson's Building, 231 George Street & Brooklyn Hotel) have considerable significance. All facades contribute to the overall richness of the group, with Royal Naval House the focal point and the Johnson's Building leading nicely around the corner to a "coda" of two small but heavily textured facades which seem to be a logical end to the whole. The trees, which are deciduous, give an added quality to the richness of the facades and have considerable significance. The facades as a group have important landmark qualities with their location on the north-west corner of a major intersection, providing an entry point to The Rocks.

Brooklyn Hotel is significant for its facade and shopfront, which are typical of the period, with bay windows and a deep recessed verandah, the whole surmounted by a gable end with interesting stone trims. The top verandah is interesting in a picturesque manner flanked by two Ionic columns. The whole facade has high quality stone detailing. The awning forms an important part of this composition and the shopfront below, which is probably contemporary with the building, is unique. The interiors of the ground and first floor bars are significant and well designed for their purpose.

The place has a strong or special association with a particular community or cultural group in New South Wales for social, cultural or spiritual reasons.

The Brooklyn Hotel is of social significance to its regular clientele, mostly the office workers and tourists to the area, as a place to meet and relax. Its location, character, and continuity of service make it a recognisable feature in the area.

The place is important in demonstrating the principal characteristics of a class of cultural or natural places/environments in New South Wales.

The Brooklyn Hotel is representative of a type of building traditionally associated with a meeting place and abode for working men within the traditional mixed residential, commercial, industrial and maritime uses of The Rocks area. Development on the site is representative of the historical phases from 1788 to the present day.

== See also ==
- Johnson's Building, The Rocks
- Australian non-residential architectural styles
