= 231 George Street, The Rocks =

Heritage-listed building in Sydney, Australia

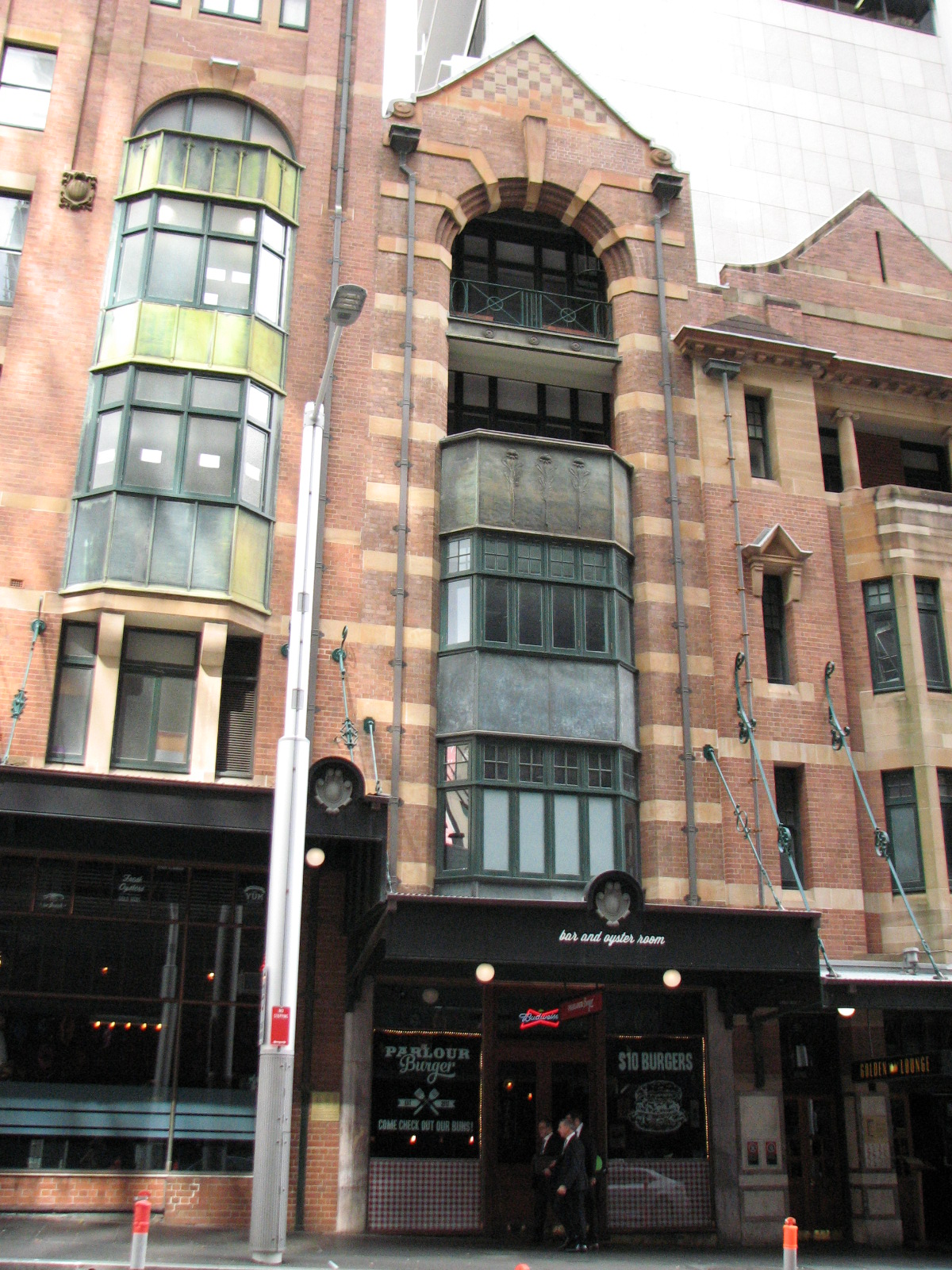
- 231 George Street, The Rocks, New South Wales (centre of photo)

- Location within Sydney Location within Australia
- 33.8631°S 151.2073°E
- Location: 231 George Street, The Rocks, City of Sydney, New South Wales, Australia

History
- Built: 1914–1915

Site notes
- Architectural style: Federation Free Classical
- Owner: Property NSW

New South Wales Heritage Register
- Official name: Commercial building
- Type: State heritage (built)
- Designated: 10 May 2002
- Reference no.: 1540
- Type: Other - Residential Buildings (private)
- Category: Residential buildings (private)

231 George Street is a heritage-listed commercial office building at 231 George Street, in the inner city Sydney suburb of The Rocks in the City of Sydney local government area of New South Wales, Australia. It was built from 1914 to 1915. The property is owned by Property NSW, an agency of the Government of New South Wales. It was added to the New South Wales State Heritage Register on 10 May 2002.

== History ==
The site occupied by 231 George Street was over part of the original Parade Ground of the Colony. The land was claimed by Robert Howe on the basis of a land grant promised to his father by Governor Macquarie. Robert Howe and the Sydney Gazette Office occupied premises which had street frontages both to George and Grosvenor Streets from 1824-28. By 1848 the original grant fronting George Street comprised 'Mr Dawson's' house, a passage and the first of a series of terraced shops and houses. Mr Dawson, watch and chronometer maker, occupied the house from 1848 until c. 1862. The house remained essentially unaltered until demolition commenced in 1911/12 for the widening of George Street. While the new Brooklyn Hotel and Chamber of Commerce building were completed by the end of 1912, this site remained vacant for that year, housing the temporary bar of the Brooklyn. Early in 1915 the site was rated by the City Council as "land". Later in the same year the State Metal Quarries are listed as tenants of a four-storey brick structure with an iron roof. Thus, 231 George Street was probably erected in 1914 or 1915.

From 1980 negotiations proceeded with the private sector on proposals for mixed development and recycling on the land bounded by George, Grosvenor, Harrington and Essex Streets, known as Sites D5, D6 and D11. The agreement for the Grosvenor Place project was signed in June 1983 involving the renovation of Royal Naval House and four adjacent buildings, including 231 George Street. Work on Grosvenor Place commenced in 1984 and was completed in 1988. In 1987 work commenced on the $12.5 million reconstruction and renovation of Royal Naval House and Federation Hall in Grosvenor Street to enable the buildings to house the Sydney Futures Exchange. The reconstruction and renovation of the three remaining historic buildings on the site, including 231 George Street, was carried out in 1989 for use as bars and restaurant.

== Description ==
231 George Street is a narrow frontage four-storey office building which infills the space between the Johnson's Building and the Brooklyn Hotel. It is a brick and sandstone building with a projecting bay window and triangular chequerboard pediment at roof level.

Style: Federation Free Classical; Storeys: Four; Roof Cladding: Iron; Floor Frame: Timber.

The building was extensively reconstructed in 1989, with only the façade of the building remaining of the original fabric.

=== Modifications and dates ===
In the late 1980s, major work was undertaken to the group of buildings to enable their reuse. The street facades, including awnings and shop fronts, were conserved. The interiors of the buildings were extensively modified.

== Heritage listing ==
As at 30 March 2011, This commercial building and site are of State heritage significance for their historical and scientific cultural values. The site and building are also of State heritage significance for their contribution to The Rocks area which is of State Heritage significance in its own right.

As a group, the buildings (Federation Hall, Royal Naval House, Johnson's Building, 231 George Street and Brooklyn Hotel) have considerable significance. All facades contribute to the overall richness of the group, with Royal Naval House the focal point and the Johnson's Building leading nicely around the corner to a "coda" of two small but heavily textured facades which seem to be a logical end to the whole. The trees, which are deciduous, give an added quality to the richness of the facades and have considerable significance. The facades as a group have important landmark qualities with their location on the north-west corner of a major intersection, providing an entry point to The Rocks.

231 George Street is an Edwardian building completed in the Federation Free Style, presenting a very tall, narrow façade to George Street and providing a link, in style and materials, between the Johnson's Building and the Brooklyn Hotel. Its projecting bay, arched at the top, with a triangular pediment in a chequerboard design, makes a significant contribution to the landmark quality of the corner grouping.

Commercial building was listed on the New South Wales State Heritage Register on 10 May 2002 having satisfied the following criteria.

The place is important in demonstrating the course, or pattern, of cultural or natural history in New South Wales.

This commercial building and site are of State heritage significance for their historical and scientific cultural values. The site and building are also of State heritage significance for their contribution to The Rocks area which is of State Heritage significance in its own right.

The site was once part of the original Parade Ground of the Colony and the site's changing use reflects the urban, economic and social development of the area from the very early days of the colony to the present. The redevelopment of the site in the late 20th century is a demonstration of the compromises that were made to accommodate new development.

The place is important in demonstrating aesthetic characteristics and/or a high degree of creative or technical achievement in New South Wales.

231 George Street: This Edwardian building is in Federation Free Style, presenting a very tall, narrow façade to George Street and providing a link, in style and materials, between the Johnson's Building and the Brooklyn Hotel. Its projecting bay, arched at the top, with a triangular pediment in a chequerboard design, makes a significant contribution to the landmark quality of the corner grouping.

As a group, the buildings (Federation Hall, Royal Naval House, Johnson's Building, 231 George Street & Brooklyn Hotel) have considerable significance. All facades contribute to the overall richness of the group, with Royal Naval House the focal point and the Johnson's Building leading nicely around the corner to a "coda" of two small but heavily textured facades which seem to be a logical end to the whole. The trees, which are deciduous, give an added quality to the richness of the facades and have considerable significance. The facades as a group have important landmark qualities with their location on the north-west corner of a major intersection, providing an entry point to The Rocks.

The place has potential to yield information that will contribute to an understanding of the cultural or natural history of New South Wales.

The redevelopment of the site and the reconstruction of the building in 1989 has left the façade as the only original fabric. There was extensive excavation below the building. Therefore, the archaeological resource has been destroyed and the site has low potential for archaeological research. The site still retains value for other areas of research such as changing architectural styles and adaptive reuse.

== See also ==
- Australian non-residential architectural styles
- Brooklyn Hotel
- Federation Hall
- Johnson's Building
- Royal Naval House
