= Federation Hall =

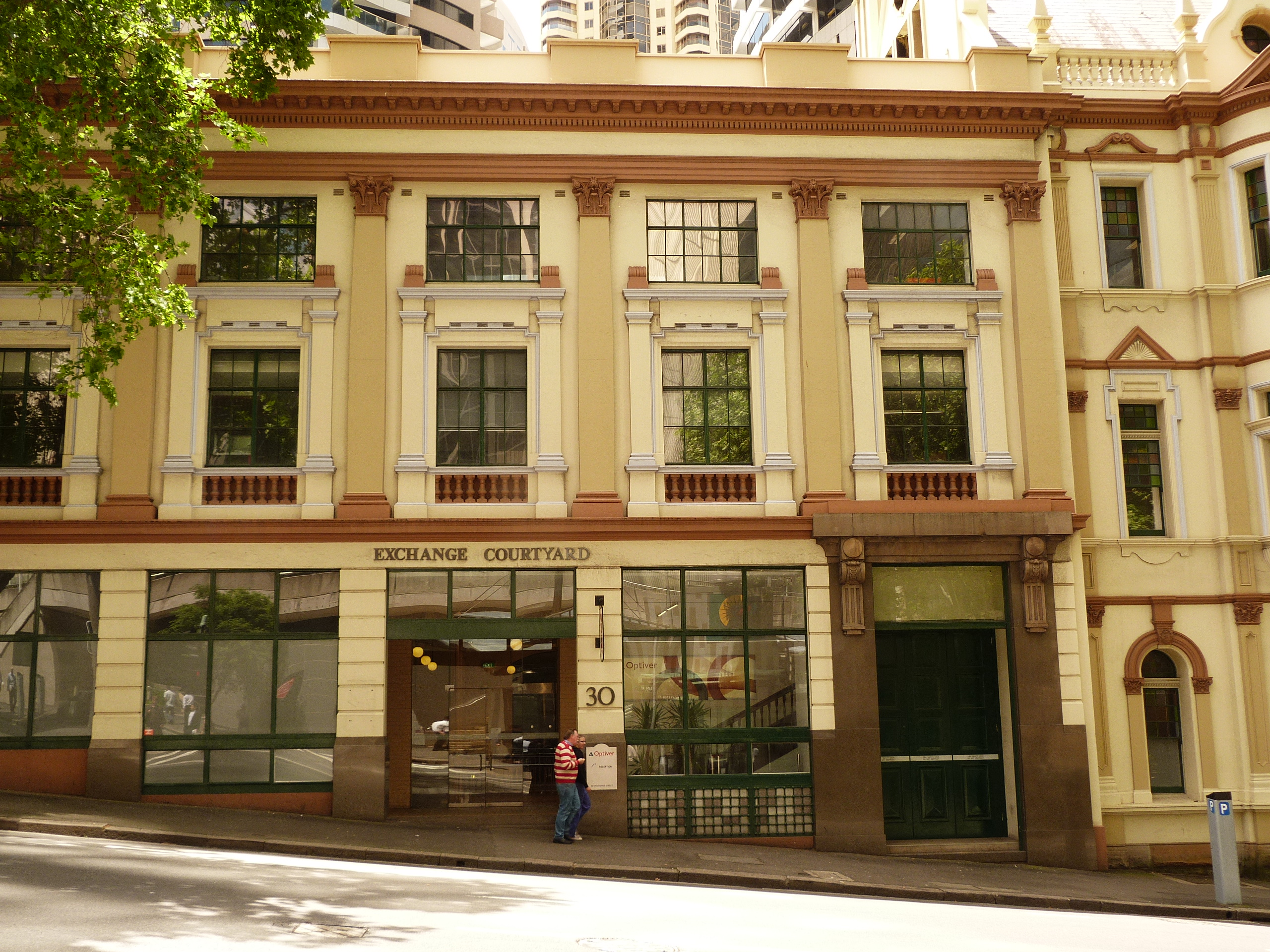
- Federation Hall, pictured in 2010

- Location within Sydney Location within Australia
- 33.8632°S 151.2066°E
- Location: 24–30 Grosvenor Street, The Rocks, City of Sydney, New South Wales, Australia

History
- Built: 1889–1891

Site notes
- Architect(s): Alterations – Scott and Green
- Owner: Sydney Harbour Foreshore Authority

New South Wales Heritage Register
- Official name: Federation Hall and courtyard; Exchange Courtyard; Meat Board Building
- Type: State heritage (built)
- Designated: 10 May 2002
- Reference no.: 1546
- Type: Theatre
- Category: Commercial

Federation Hall is a heritage-listed former meeting hall and theatre and now commercial building that houses the Sydney Futures Exchange located at 24–30 Grosvenor Street in the inner city Sydney suburb of The Rocks in the City of Sydney local government area of New South Wales, Australia. It was built from 1889 to 1891, with alterations designed by Scott and Green. It is also known as Exchange Courtyard and Meat Board Building. The property is owned by Property NSW, an agency of the Government of New South Wales. It was added to the New South Wales State Heritage Register on 10 May 2002.

== History ==
This site was originally at the western limit of the Parade Ground of the Colony and the commencement of the then unnamed Grosvenor Street. The original claimant to the site was William Davis who owned extensive land holdings within The Rocks in the early years of the Colony. In 1848 the site with a simple two-storied Georgian residence erected upon it. Between 1887 and 1889 demolition took place for the Royal Naval House site. It has been assumed here, from the evidence examined, that these buildings were all demolished in that period. Between 1889 and 1891 a three-storey brick and cement building with flat roof was erected on this site. This building with its plastered facade and pediment decoration forms the first three floors of the present building.

The building was completed in 1891. It was built as a parish hall for t Patrick's Church and was used for that purpose until 1914. There were shops at ground level, which were leased by the parish to tenants. The property was sold by the parish in the 1920s.

The early section was constructed as a series of shops to Grosvenor Street and a large space above with entry from Harrington Street known from c. 1892 – c. 1915 as Federation Hall. From c. 1915 – c. 1924 the Hall was known as the Repertory Theatre. In 1922 plans of proposed alterations and additions to 24-36 Grosvenor St were submitted to the City Council. The plans show the additions of two further floors and other modifications. Evidence from the Rate Assessment Books suggest that this work took place in 1923–24. The site was occupied by a number of organisations, including the newly formed NRMA from 1927 to 1930 and F. W. Hughes Ltd from 1930.

From 1980 negotiations proceeded with the private sector on proposals for mixed development and recycling on the land bounded by George, Grosvenor, Harrington and Essex Streets, known as Sites D5, D6 and D11. The agreement for the Grosvenor Place project was signed in June, 1983 involving the renovation of Royal Naval House and four adjacent buildings, including Federation Hall. Work on Grosvenor Place commenced in 1984 and was completed in 1988. In 1987, work commenced on the $12.5 million reconstruction and renovation of Royal Naval House and Federation Hall in Grosvenor Street to enable the buildings to house the Sydney Futures Exchange. The work involved the reinstatement of the original verandah and courtyard in a new location, and the restoration of the street facades. The reconstruction and renovation of the three remaining historic buildings on the site was carried out in 1989 for use as bars and restaurant.

== Description ==
Style: Late Victorian; Storeys: three plus two

=== Modifications and dates ===
- 1922 – Proposed alterations and additions to 24-46 Grosvenor Street were submitted to the City Council by Scott and Green, Architects. The plans show the addition of two further floors and other modifications. Evidence from the Rate Assessment Books suggest this work took place in the period 1923–1924.
- 1989 – The reconstruction and renovation of this building and Royal Naval House was undertaken for the Sydney Futures Exchange, involving the reinstatement of the original verandah and courtyard in a new location within the building and the restoration of the street facades.

== Heritage listing ==
As at 30 March 2011, Federation Hall and courtyard and site are of State heritage significance for their historical and scientific cultural values. The site and building are also of State heritage significance for their contribution to The Rocks area which is of State Heritage significance in its own right.

As a group, the buildings (Federation Hall, Royal Naval House, Johnson's Building, 231 George Street and Brooklyn Hotel) have considerable significance. All facades contribute to the overall richness of the group, with Royal Naval House the focal point and the Johnson's Building leading nicely around the corner to a "coda" of two small but heavily textured facades which seem to be a logical end to the whole. The trees, which are deciduous, give an added quality to the richness of the facades and have considerable significance, linking them together in a very satisfactory way. In the context of Grosvenor Street, the facades have a landmark status facing the open space of Lang Park on the southern side of the street.

Federation Hall: This building has an aesthetically pleasing neo-classical facade with a sympathetic later addition of two top storeys. The interior spaces are fairly simple, the entrances are good, and the facade is an important element in the streetscape.

Federation Hall was listed on the New South Wales State Heritage Register on 10 May 2002 having satisfied the following criteria.

The place is important in demonstrating the course, or pattern, of cultural or natural history in New South Wales.

Federation Hall and courtyard and site are of State heritage significance for their historical and scientific cultural values. The site and building are also of State heritage significance for their contribution to The Rocks area which is of State Heritage significance in its own right.

The place is important in demonstrating aesthetic characteristics and/or a high degree of creative or technical achievement in New South Wales.

As a group, the buildings (Federation Hall, Royal Naval House, Johnson's Building, 231 George Street and Brooklyn Hotel) have considerable significance. All facades contribute to the overall richness of the group, with Royal Naval House the focal point and the Johnson's Building leading nicely around the corner to a "coda" of two small but heavily textured facades which seem to be a logical end to the whole. The trees, which are deciduous, give an added quality to the richness of the facades and have considerable significance, linking them together in a very satisfactory way. In the context of Grosvenor Street, the facades have a landmark status facing the open space of Lang Park on the southern side of the street.

Federation Hall: This building has an aesthetically pleasing neo-classical facade with a sympathetic later addition of two top storeys. The interior spaces are fairly simple, the entrances are good, and the facade is an important element in the streetscape.

== See also ==
- Royal Naval House
- Johnson's Building
- 231 George Street
- Brooklyn Hotel
