= St Patrick's Church, The Rocks =

St Patrick's Catholic Church, The Rocks
- St Patrick's, Church Hill
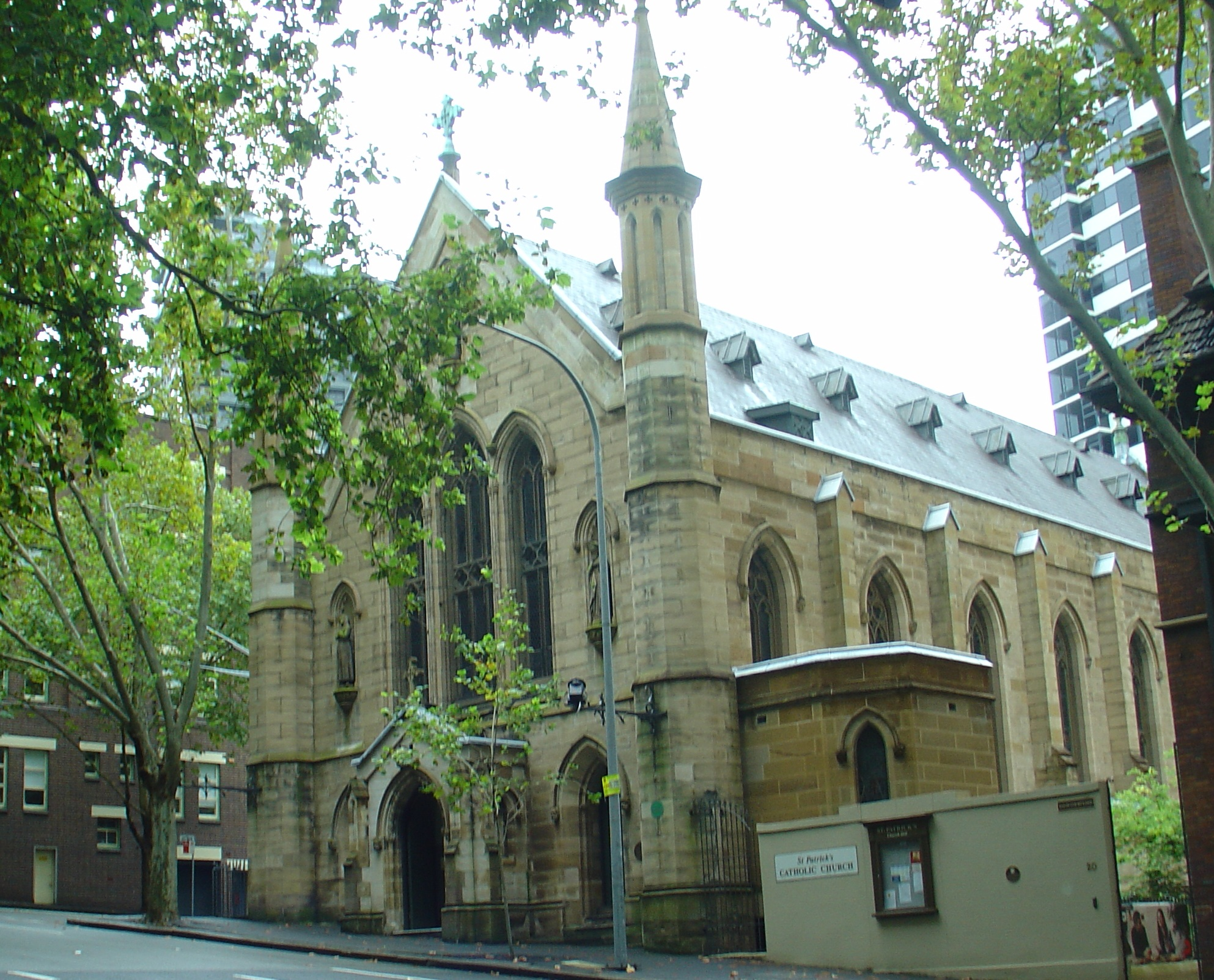

- Location in Sydney central business district
- 33.8630878°S 151.2060555°E
- Location: 20 Grosvenor Street, The Rocks, City of Sydney, New South Wales
- Country: Australia
- Denomination: Catholic
- Religious order: Marist Fathers
- Website: stpatschurchhill.org

History
- Status: Church
- Founded: 25 August 1840
- Founder: William Davis
- Dedication: Saint Patrick
- Dedicated: 18 March 1844

Architecture
- Functional status: Active
- Architects: William Fernyhough; John Frederick Hilly
- Style: Gothic Revival
- Years built: 1840–1844

Administration
- Metropolis: Sydney

The St Patrick's Catholic Church is the oldest surviving Catholic church in Sydney, New South Wales, Australia. Opened in 1844, it is located at the junction of Grosvenor and Gloucester Streets in the inner city suburb of The Rocks in the City of Sydney. It is also known as St Patrick's, Church Hill or St Pat's Church Hill. The property is owned by the Trustees of the Roman Catholic Archdiocese of Sydney. The Marist Fathers, a religious order, have administered the parish since 1868.

== History ==
The church was built on land donated in 1840 by Catholic emancipist William Davis, who had originally been transported after the Irish Rebellion of 1798. In the early years of the colony, when there was no Catholic priest resident in Sydney, Davis had sponsored Catholic prayer at his home.

In 1840, plans advanced to build a second Catholic church, after the original St Mary's Church. The site was chosen to be close to the ex-convict working-class neighborhoods in The Rocks, at a distance from the official city, and the foundation stone blessed on 25 August.

A design by William Fernyhough, possibly based on St. Anthony's Church in Liverpool, proved unsuitable for the site, and John Frederick Hilly was hired to redesign it. It built from 1840 to 1844 by Andrew Ross & Co., and dedicated 18 March 1844, instead of Saint Patrick's Day, out of a desire to avoid potential violence and religious bigotry. It had no resident priest at first, as the first associated cleric, Francis Murphy, was appointed apostolic vicar of Adelaide in 1842. Irishman John McEncroe became the first permanent parish priest, serving in that role from 1861 to 1868. At his wish, the parish was entrusted thereafter to the French Marist Fathers.

St. Patrick's opened a parochial school in 1865, operated by the Sisters of Mercy, originally in the crypt of the church and in 1876 moving to a separate school building. The church and school, along with the nearby Scots Kirk and St. Philip's Anglican Church, gave rise to the area being nicknamed "Church Hill".

The church is associated with the heritage-listed Federation Hall located at 24-30 Grosvenor Street, built as a parish hall and was used for that purpose until 1914. The property was sold by the parish in the 1920s.

At the turn of the twentieth century, developments such as the plague epidemic of 1900 and redevelopment of The Rocks from a residential to a commercial area, and later the construction of the Sydney Harbour Bridge, contributed to concerns about the viability of the parish. The churches of St Michael's and St. Joseph's Providence were demolished, and St Bridget's was merged with St. Patrick's, the latter remaining in use as a chapel of ease. Nevertheless, St. Patrick's has remained extremely popular for Catholic services, one of the busiest in Australia. In 1999, the church underwent a major restoration, including the installation of a new Fratelli Ruffatti pipe organ.

== See also ==
- Catholic Church in Australia
