= Ann Howe =

Australian newspaper proprietor

Ann Howe (c.1802–1842) was a newspaper proprietor in the colony of New South Wales who published a paper which vigorously supported the liberal Governor Richard Bourke and represented the emancipist (ex-convict) voice.

She was born in Sydney, the child of two ex-convicts: Sarah Bird, the colony's first female publican, and John Morris. In December 1821 she married Robert Howe, the son and heir of George Howe, an ex-convict and successful publisher of the Sydney Gazette and printer of government publications, who had recently died. Ann bore Robert four children and raised his son by a convict woman. After he drowned in 1829, she prevented the sale of the Sydney Gazette to its rival the Sydney Herald by her husband's executors, then took an active role in running the paper. She claimed the executors, Richard Jones, and Rev. Ralph Mansfield (editor of the paper), had run the business down and were about to accept a low price when she persuaded a reluctant Jones to let her manage it.

She aligned the paper with Bourke, and against the conservative 'exclusives' (who were opposed to wider democracy in the colony and participation of ex-convicts in public life). The exclusives were represented by the Herald. She appointed as editor a ticket-of-leave convict, William Augustus Watt, who wrote editorials against the spirit of slavery and attempted to expose abuses of some of the exclusives, in particular James Mudie, a bitter opponent of Bourke's. In retaliation, Watt was brought before the bench on trumped up charges, but Bourke had him removed to Port Macquarie, where the Howes had a land grant on the Macleay River. In 1836 she married Watt in Port Macquarie, although Mudie maliciously tried to prevent the marriage by claiming that Watt was of bad character. Richard Jones then used his power as executor and of guarantor of outstanding loans to transfer ownership of the paper to Howe's eldest son, Anne's stepson, Robert Charles.

Watt drowned in 1837 in Port Macquarie. In 1840, Ann married Thomas Salmon, a butcher, and lived with him in George Street, Sydney. She died in 1842.
