= Throstles Nest Hotel, Scotland Road =

Pub in Liverpool, England

Coordinates: 53.422°N 2.981°W

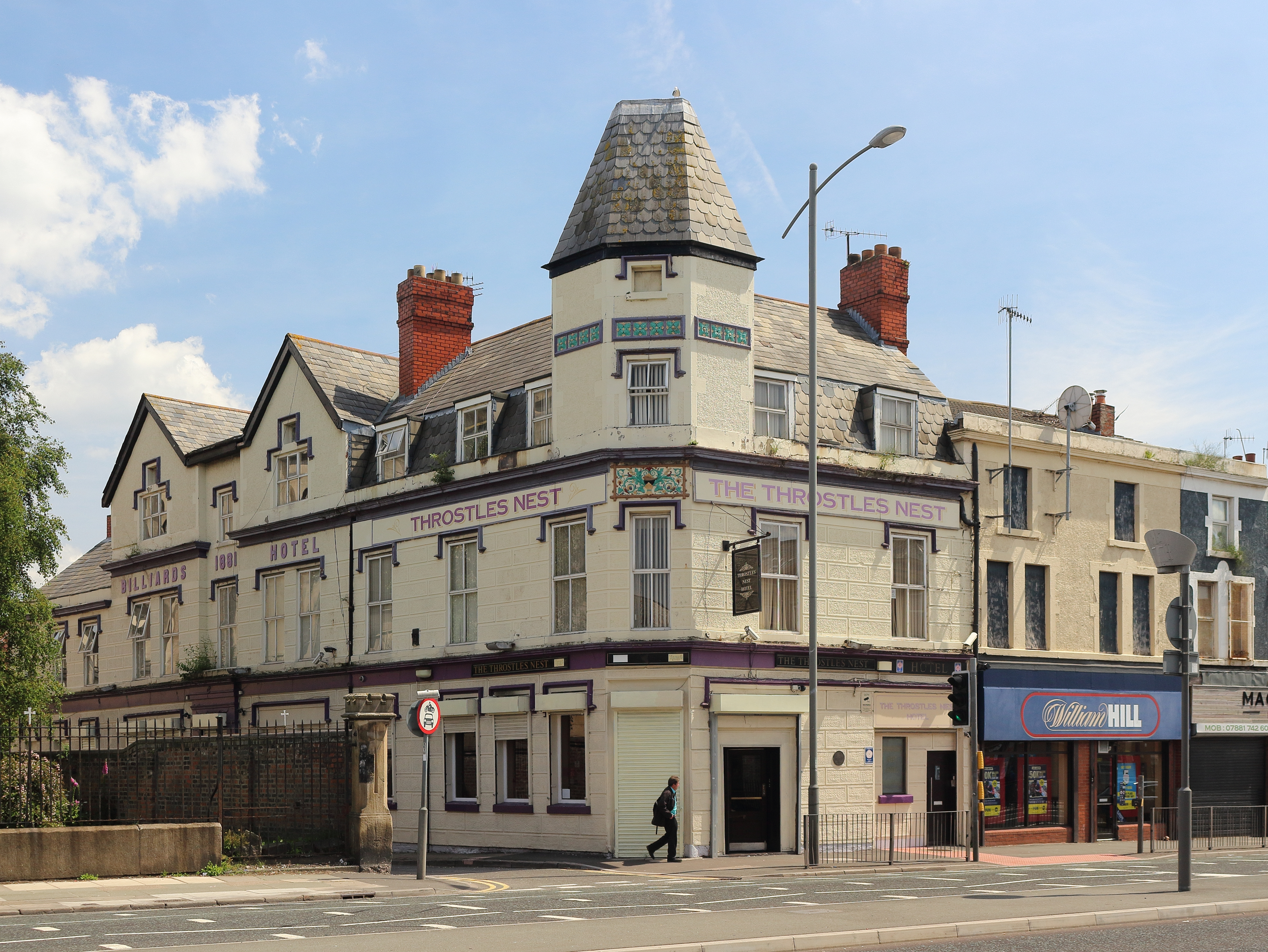
The Throstles Nest in 2019

The Throstles Nest Hotel is a pub with guesthouse on Scotland Road in Vauxhall, Liverpool, adjacent to St Anthony's Church.

Opened in 1804, the Throstles Nest is the last remaining pub of more than 200 on Scotland Road, formerly the main artery of a crowded tenement area with a heavily Irish population. The guesthouse above the pub was listed as one of Liverpool's ten best hotels in 2014. The business was put up for sale in September 2022.
