= Scotland Road =

Road in Vauxhall, Liverpool, England

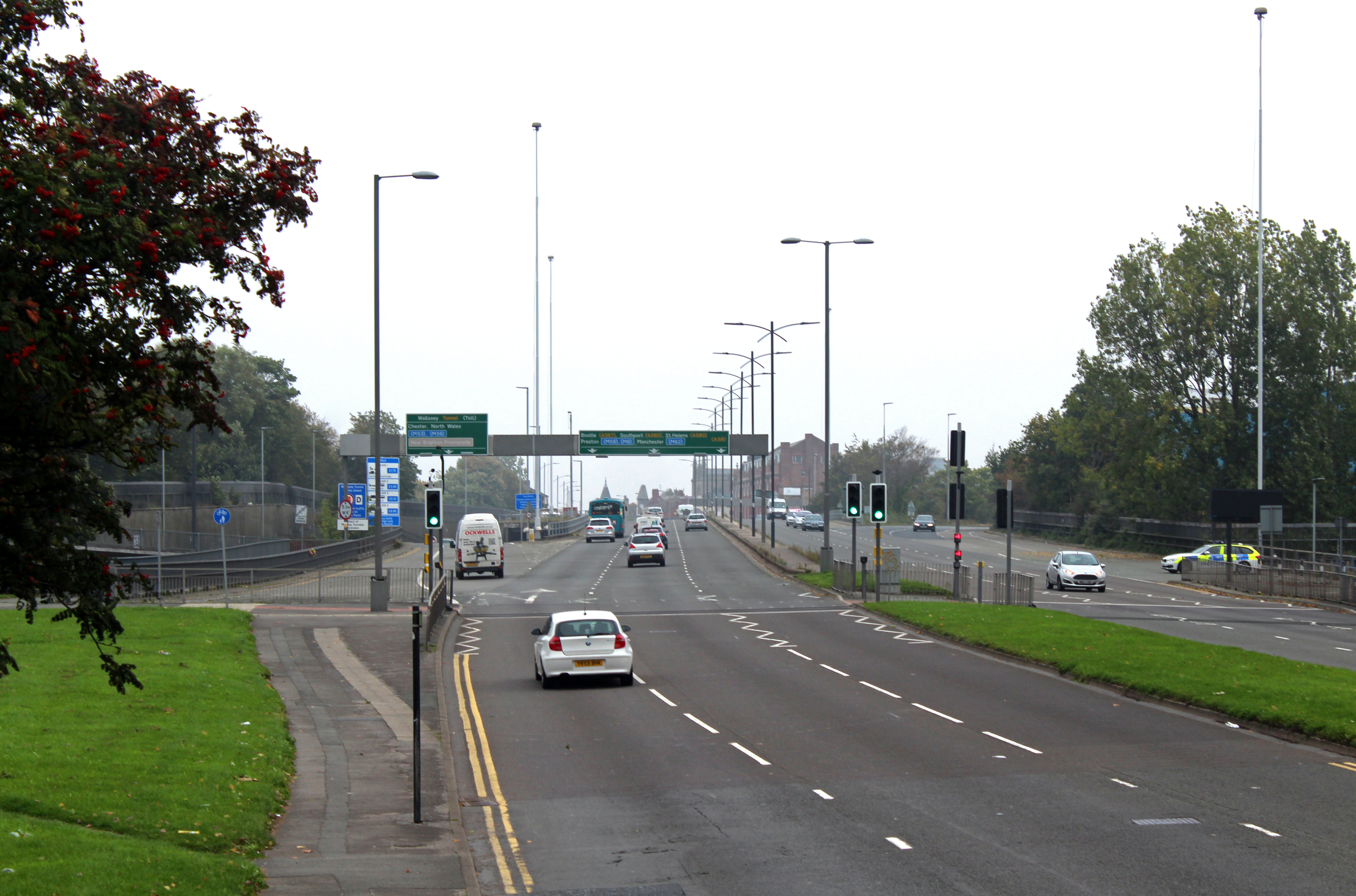
- Scotland Road leading to the Kingsway Tunnel entrance on the left

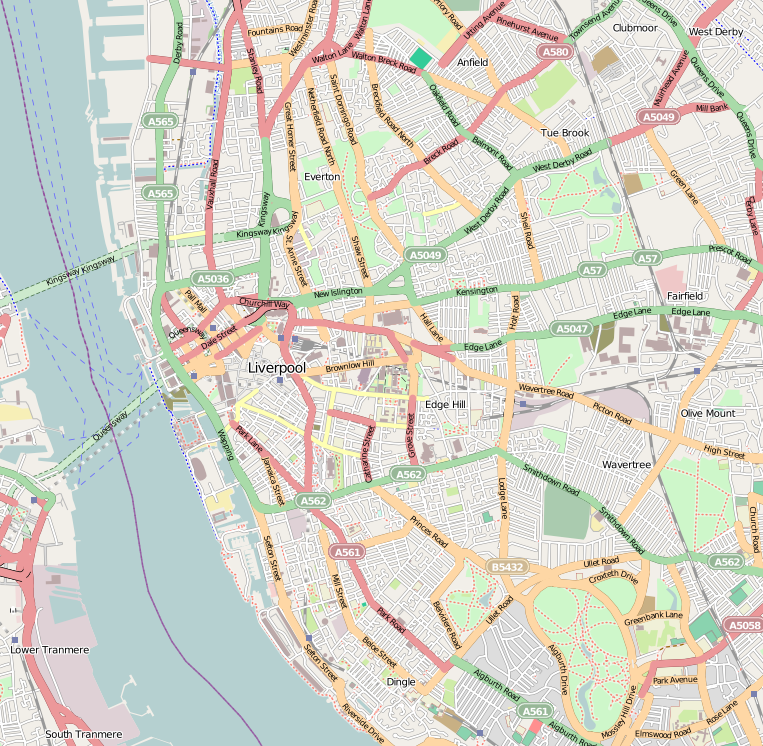
- Location within Liverpool
- Part of: A59 road
- Location: Vauxhall, Liverpool
- Postal code: L5
- Coordinates: 53.42281°N 2.98207°W

Other
- Known for: Residential, St Anthony's Church, Kingsway Tunnel, supermarkets, fast food

Scotland Road, known locally as Scottie Road, is the section of the A59 road situated near the docks in the Vauxhall district of north Liverpool, England.

== History ==
Scotland Road was created in the 1770s as a turnpike road to Preston, Lancashire, via Walton and Burscough. It became part of a stagecoach route to Scotland, hence its name. It was partly widened in 1803, and streets of working-class housing were laid out on either side as Liverpool expanded. Scotland Road was at the centre of working-class life for the people of the surrounding Everton and Vauxhall areas near the north Liverpool docks and the city centre.

The population in the Victorian era was swelled by the arrival of thousands of Irish immigrants, many of whom had fled Ireland's Great Famine. The area became known for having a large number of Irish-Catholic residents, and the Liverpool Scotland UK Parliament constituency was represented by T. P. O'Connor, an Irish Nationalist MP for 44 years until 1929, being the first and only constituency outside of Ireland to continually vote for an Irish nationalist.

== Decline ==
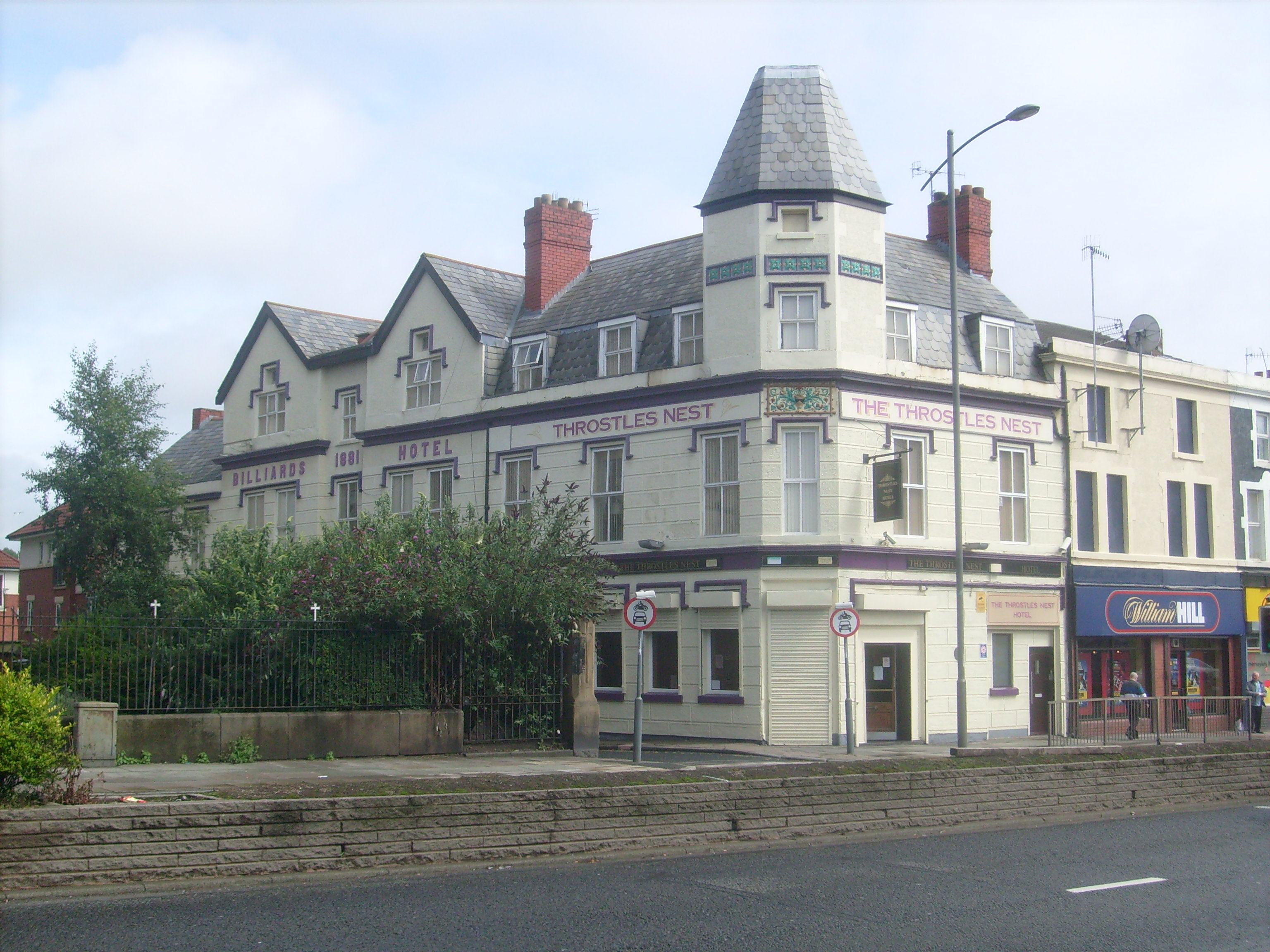
The Throstles Nest, the last remaining pub on Scotland Road

The area had a vibrant community and was home to a large Irish population, but was often associated with poor housing, poverty, violence, and sectarian divisions. Many dwellings in the area were demolished in the 1930s, and replacement housing included corporation flats.

After the Second World War ended in 1945, many residents were rehoused in new council houses in areas such as Croxteth, Halewood, Huyton, Kirkby, Norris Green, and Stockbridge Village, leaving Scotland Road in a state of steady decline. Housing was further cleared by the construction of the second Mersey tunnel, with many former residents moving to Kirkby. Depopulation of the region is evident from census and electoral records, with election turnout in 1931 at 27,444 (representing 68.7% of eligible voters) yet 70 years later in the 2001 census, the population was 6,699.

There once were over 200 pubs in the Scotland Road area, but as of 2022 only The Throstles Nest, which opened in 1804, remains; it is next to St Anthony's Church.

== Scotland Road Free School ==
Scotland Road Free School was a short-lived example of democratic education, established in 1970 by two local teachers. It was based at Major Street, just off Scotland Road. A related project, Liverpool Community Transport, was established in a disused transport depot in nearby Leeds Street.

== Liverpool John Moores University ==
At its southern end, Scotland Road becomes Byrom Street, the location of the largest campus of Liverpool John Moores University.

== Notable residents ==
- Tom Baker (born 1934), actor best known for playing the Fourth Doctor in Doctor Who
- Cilla Black (1943–2015), singer and television personality
- Tommy Comerford (1933–2003), crime boss
- Thomas Cecil Gray (1913–2008), pioneering anaesthetist
- Holly Johnson (born 1960), singer best known for fronting Frankie Goes to Hollywood
- Rt. Rev. Thomas Anthony Williams (born 1948), auxiliary bishop of Liverpool's Roman Catholic Archdiocese

== Other uses ==
The term "Scotland Road" can also be used as a slang reference to a corridor or passageway which allows crew access to the length of a vehicle. For example, on board the RMS Titanic, a broad, lower-deck working corridor on E Deck, which ran the length of the ship, was referred to by crew as "Scotland Road" (and by officers as "Park Lane"). Jeffrey Hatcher's play Scotland Road refers to that corridor of the Titanic.
