= Johnson's Building, The Rocks =

Johnson's Building
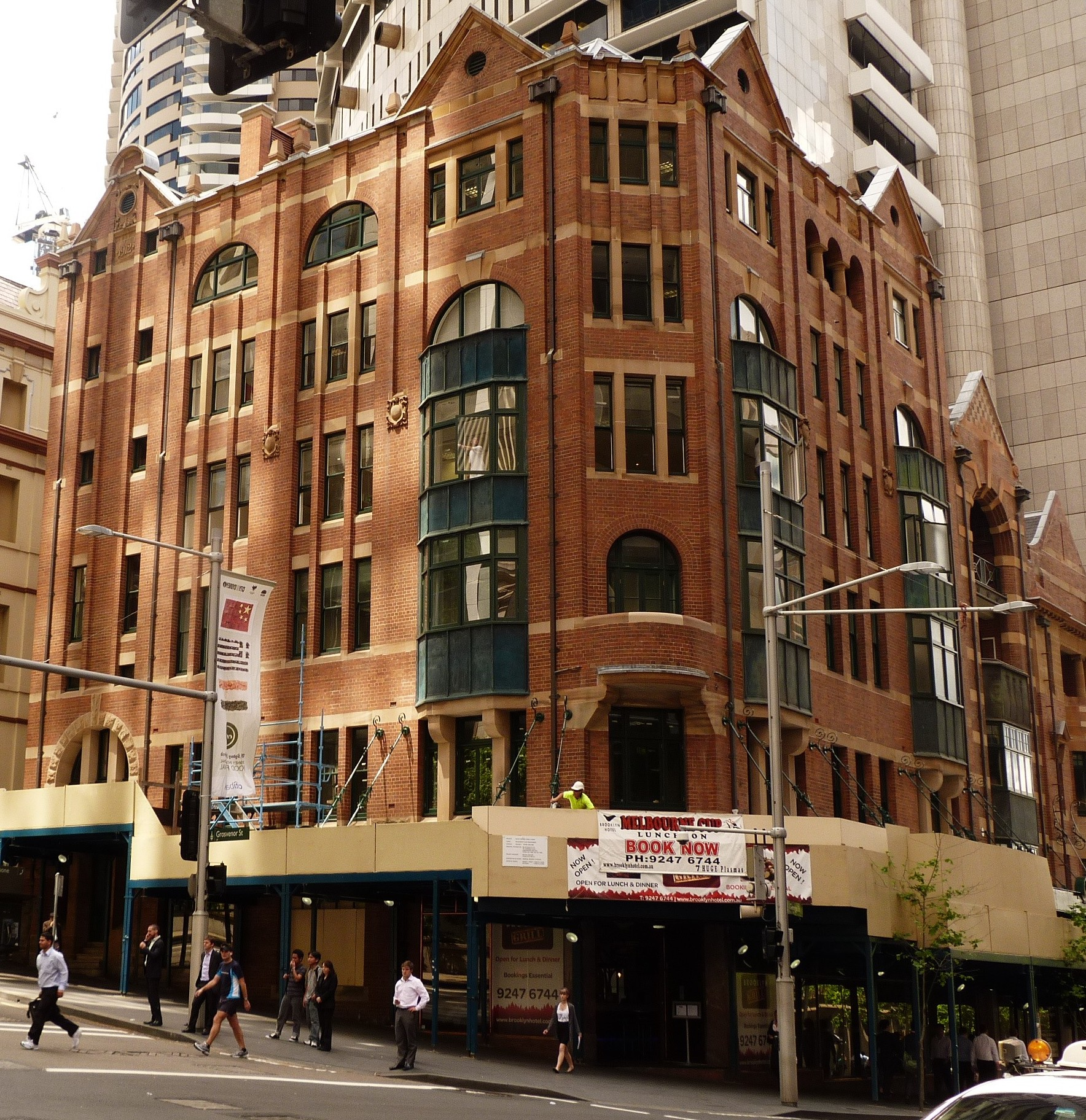
- Johnson's Building, pictured in 2010

- Location within Sydney Location within Australia
- 33.8632°S 151.2073°E
- Location: 233–235 George Street, The Rocks, City of Sydney, New South Wales, Australia

History
- Built: 1912

Site notes
- Architect: Walter Liberty Vernon
- Architectural style: Federation Free Style
- Owner: Property NSW

New South Wales Heritage Register
- Official name: Johnson's Building; Chamber of Commerce Building; Johnson's Overalls Building (Johnsons)
- Type: State heritage (built)
- Designated: 10 May 2002
- Reference no.: 1554
- Type: Shop
- Category: Commercial

Johnson's Building is a heritage-listed former retail stores and now stock exchange offices, bar and restaurant located at 233–235 George Street in the inner city Sydney suburb of The Rocks, New South Wales, Australia. It was designed by Walter Liberty Vernon and built in 1912. It is also known as Chamber of Commerce Building and Johnson's Overalls Building (Johnsons). The property is owned by Property NSW, an agency of the Government of New South Wales. It was added to the New South Wales State Heritage Register on 10 May 2002.

== History ==
The site occupied by 233–235 George Street was once part of the original Parade Ground of the colony. By the 1820s this corner site was still owned by the NSW Government. In c. 1831 the site was subdivided into four allotments. Of these, three fronted George Street and one Grosvenor Street. A small lane which opened onto Grosvenor Street separated this latter from those with George Street frontages. The corner site at Grosvenor and George Streets was purchased from the government in 1831 by Anthony Hordern and remained the property of the Hordern family until the Darling Harbour Wharves Resumption Act 1900 (NSW). The building erected by Hordern on this site, which appears in Fowles engraving of 1848, remained essentially unaltered until 1911/12 when demolition occurred for the widening of George Street, together with the 1845 building to the north owned by Alexander Douglas from 1831 until 1901. The site to the north of Douglas block was purchased from the Colonial Government in 1831 by John Richards. These four properties were demolished in 1911/12 and the new Chamber of Commerce Building was erected in 1912. James Johnson had a long association with the corner site and, for a lesser of time, with the Douglas property adjoining to the north. James Johnson, draper and clothier, was associated with this site since 1867, and the building is probably known as to many people for its association with Johnson's Overalls, and associated range of chef's and steward's clothing and equipment.

From 1980 negotiations proceeded with the private sector on proposals for mixed development and recycling on the land bounded by George, Grosvenor, Harrington and Essex Streets, known as Sites D5, D6 and D11. The agreement for the Grosvenor Place project was signed in June 1983 involving the renovation of Royal Naval House and four adjacent buildings, including the Johnson's Building. Work on Grosvenor Place commenced in 1984 and was completed in 1988. In 1987, work commenced on the $12.5 million reconstruction and renovation of Royal Naval House and Federation Hall in Grosvenor Street to enable the buildings to house the Sydney Futures Exchange. The work involved the reinstatement of the original verandah and courtyard in a new location, and the restoration of the street facades. The reconstruction and renovation of the three remaining historic buildings on the site, including the Johnson's Building, was carried out in 1989 for use as bars and restaurant.

From 1980 negotiations proceeded with the private sector on proposals for mixed development and recycling on the land bounded by George, Grosvenor, Harrington and Essex Streets, known as Sites D5, D6 and D11. In 1983 an agreement was signed for the Grosvenor Place project involving the $12.5 million reconstruction and renovation of Royal Naval House and Federation Hall in Grosvenor Street to enable the buildings to house the Sydney Futures Exchange. Grosvenor Place was constructed in 1984–1988. In 1987 work commenced on Royal Naval House and Federation Hall in Grosvenor Street being completed in 1989. The reconstruction and renovation of the three remaining historic buildings on the site, including the Johnson's Building, was carried out in 1989 for use as bars and restaurant.

== Description ==
Johnson's Building is a six-storey Edwardian brick-clad building in the Federation Free Style, notable for its vertical emphasis provided by the narrow pilasters which divide the façade between high narrow windows. The George Street façade is adorned with two storey bay windows under 5th floor semi-circular windows symmetrically placed about a central bay which has a three arch arcade to the fifth floor. On either side of this above the bay windows at roof level is a simple pediment. The splayed corner carries a curved balcony providing access to a flag pole. The Grosvenor Street façade is less decorative with the exception of the large arched entrance incorporating a board of chequered terracotta and sandstone. Sandstone trimmings frame most openings and the high pitched roof of slate is visible behind the pediments.

=== Modifications and dates ===
In the late 1980s, major work was undertaken to the group of buildings to enable their reuse. The street facade, including awning and shopfront were conserved.

== Heritage listing ==
As at 30 March 2011, Johnson's Building and site are of State heritage significance for their historical and scientific cultural values. The site and building are also of State heritage significance for their contribution to The Rocks area which is of State Heritage significance in its own right.

As a group, the buildings (Federation Hall, Royal Naval House, Johnson's Building, 231 George Street and Brooklyn Hotel) have considerable significance. All facades contribute to the overall richness of the group, with Royal Naval House the focal point and the Johnson's Building leading nicely around the corner to a "coda" of two small but heavily textured facades which seem to be a logical end to the whole. The trees, which are deciduous, give an added quality to the richness of the facades and have considerable significance. The facades as a group have important landmark qualities with their location on the north-west corner of a major intersection, providing an entry point to The Rocks and, in the context of Grosvenor Street, contrasting with the open space of Lang Park on the southern side of the street.

Johnson's Building is an outstanding Edwardian commercial building with its simple detailing to its imposing facades is a most significant element in the George Street townscape and provides a foil to the extravagant Baroque façade of Royal Naval House. The return along Milson Lane has a variety of openings, with a cat-head system for heavy loads. The shopfront with its awning, and its deeply recessed entries, is typical of the period, and one of the few remaining in original form in Sydney. The building is significant for its long and fascinating association with the Johnson organisation. The whole of the ground floor shop is significant, particularly for its openness and considerable ceiling height, and the spacious qualities of the upper floors, with their bay windows and verandahs, are also of note.

Johnson's Building was listed on the New South Wales State Heritage Register on 10 May 2002 having satisfied the following criteria.

The place is important in demonstrating aesthetic characteristics and/or a high degree of creative or technical achievement in New South Wales.

Johnson's Building and site are of State heritage significance for their historical and scientific cultural values. The site and building are also of State heritage significance for their contribution to The Rocks area which is of State Heritage significance in its own right.

As a group, the buildings (Federation Hall, Royal Naval House, Johnson's Building, 231 George Street and Brooklyn Hotel) have considerable significance. All facades contribute to the overall richness of the group, with Royal Naval House the focal point and the Johnson's Building leading nicely around the corner to a "coda" of two small but heavily textured facades which seem to be a logical end to the whole. The trees, which are deciduous, give an added quality to the richness of the facades and have considerable significance. The facades as a group have important landmark qualities with their location on the north-west corner of a major intersection, providing an entry point to The Rocks and, in the context of Grosvenor Street, contrasting with the open space of Lang Park on the southern side of the street.

Johnson's Building: This outstanding Edwardian commercial building with its simple detailing to its imposing facades is a most significant element in the George Street townscape and provides a foil to the extravagant Baroque façade of Royal Naval House. The return along Milson Lane has a variety of openings, with a cat-head system for heavy loads. The shopfront with its awning, and its deeply recessed entries, is typical of the period, and one of the few remaining in original form in Sydney. The building is significant for its long and fascinating association with the Johnson organisation. The whole of the ground floor shop is significant, particularly for its openness and considerable ceiling height, and the spacious qualities of the upper floors, with their bay windows and verandahs, are also of note.

== See also ==
- Australian non-residential architectural styles
- Brooklyn Hotel, The Rocks
- Grosvenor Street, Sydney
