= St Anthony's Church, Scotland Road =

Church in Liverpool, UK

Coordinates: 53.42229°N 2.98125°W

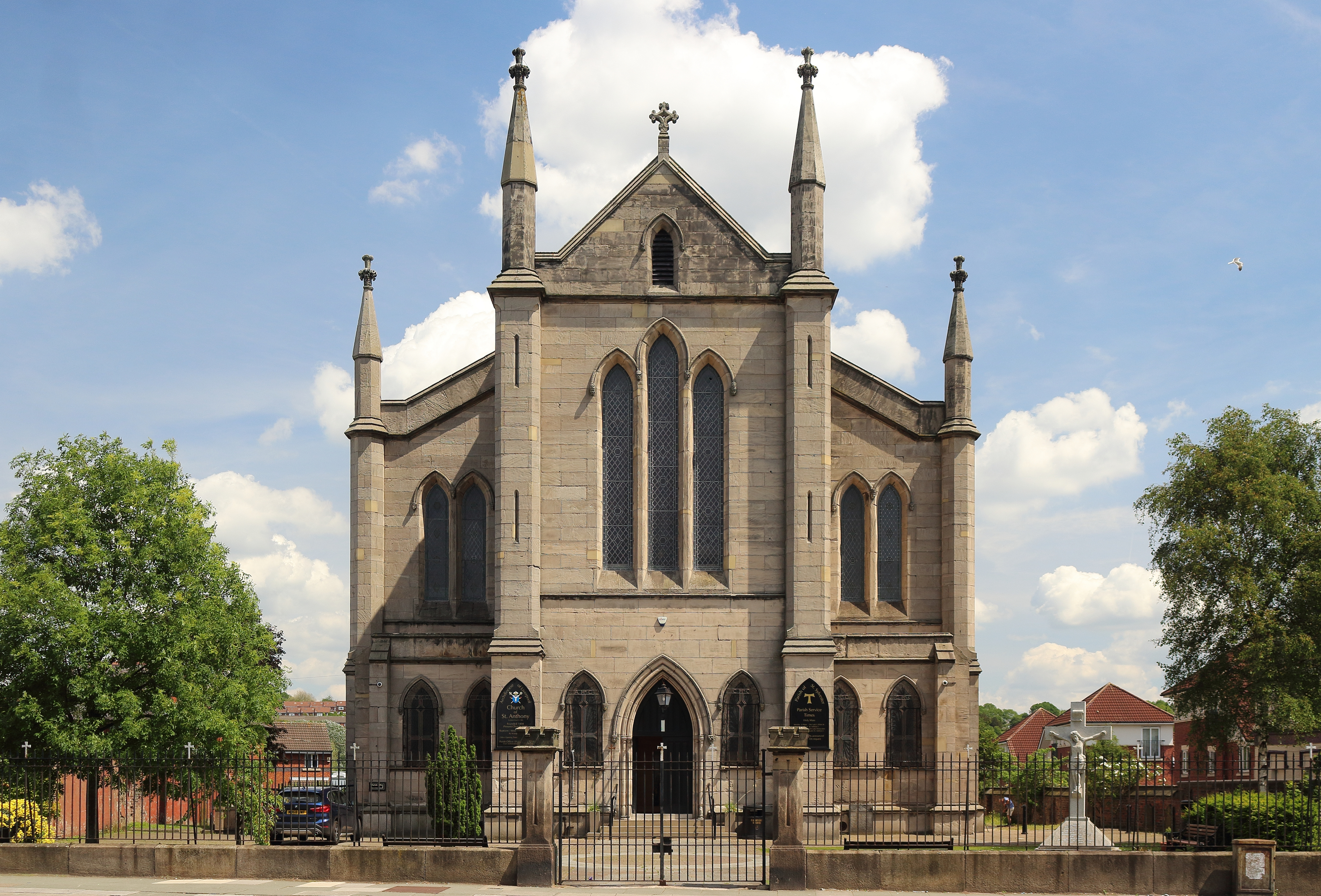

St Anthony's Roman Catholic Church, is on Scotland Road in the Vauxhall area of Liverpool. It is recorded in the National Heritage List for England as a designated Grade II listed building.

== History ==
In 1804, the French Chapel was built on the corner of Dryden Street and Scotland Road. James Picton described it as 'a little quaint-looking brick building, surmounted by a cross, with a modest residence by its side.' It was founded by the Reverend Jean Baptiste Antoine Gerardot, an émigré from the French Revolution of 1789, and Freddy O'Connor makes the interesting point that during the Napoleonic Wars 'French prisoners of war would have attended the church under supervision from the Borough Jail in Great Howard Street. Gerardot died in 1825, but his ministry was so successful that, by the late 1820s, a larger church was needed.

The famous Liverpool church of St Anthony's, Scotland Road, was built in 1833 and designed by John Broadbent. He was a pupil of Thomas Rickman (as for a time was Arthur Hill Holme) who also designed the tower of St Mary's Walton and the Classical church of St Augustine's on Shaw Street. At St Anthony's, Broadbent built a simple if not severe church with Early English buttresses and lancet windows and a surprisingly large interior. The church has a commanding presence on Scotland Road, and even the dour James Picton acknowledged that 'the building is imposing from its size and proportions'.

In April 2008, a fire occurred within St Anthony's. It is thought it had started when a 3 ft candle that was left burning overnight bent over and fell to the floor. The church survived, although it had been described as a huge job to restore. The church only reopened on 13 July with a morning mass by parish priest Fr Graeme Dunne.

=== Local events ===
St Anthony's plays host to annual beer festivals. In November 2007, the crypt hosted a beer festival, and again in September 2008

== See also ==
- Grade II listed buildings in Liverpool-L5
