= George Howe (printer) =

Australian newspaper editor

- Born: 1769; Saint Kitts
- Died: 11 May 1821 (aged 51–52); Sydney, New South Wales
- Resting place: Old Sydney Burial Ground
- Known for: Government Gazette

George Howe (1769 – 11 May 1821) was a poet, printer, and editor of the first Australian newspaper, The Sydney Gazette.

== Early life ==
Howe was the son of Thomas Howe, a government printer on Basseterre, Saint Christopher Island (now better known as Saint Kitts) in the West Indies. When he was 21, he went to London and worked as a printer for The Times. In March 1799, George Howe, alias George Happy, alias Happy George, was charged with shoplifting after he and a man named Thomas Jones had robbed a mercer's shop at Alcester. and they were sentenced to death, commuted to transportation for life to New South Wales. Howe arrived at Sydney on 22 November 1800. He received a full pardon on 4 June 1806. His amiable disposition saw him given the nickname "George Happy".

== Professional life ==
Howe printed the The Sydney Gazette. Although he had been pardoned in 1806, it was another five years before he received a salary as government printer. Publishing the Gazette often brought him into financial difficulties when subscribers did not pay. In 1815, he printed A korao no New Zealand, the first book written in the Māori language.

== Family ==
Howe's eldest son, Robert (1795–1829), helped his father from age 9, but as a teenager rebelled, indulging in excessive alcohol consumption and fathering an illegitimate child before converting to Methodism under the guidance of Ralph Mansfield and returning to the family business in 1820. Moreover, his editorial policies, stemming from his religious convictions and the newspaper's continuing support for the government, led to him being horsewhipped by William Redfern. Starting 1 January 1821, the Gazette was jointly edited by Mansfield, a division of duties that Howe hoped would facilitate his retirement from the newspaper. Less than a month later, on 29 January 1829, Howe drowned in a boating accident off Fort Denison, leaving his wife, Ann, as proprietor of the Gazette and Mansfield as the editor.

George Terry Howe (c. 1806–63), Robert's younger half-brother by his father's common law wife, Elizabeth Easton, went to Launceston, Tasmania in October 1821, becoming the town's first printer and the founding editor of the Tasmanian and Port Dalrymple Advertiser. In 1825, he was persuaded by the Lt. Governor Sir George Arthur to form a partnership with James Ross in Hobart, where he was appointed government printer and co-edited the Hobart Town Gazette. In 1827, he left the Gazette to edit the Tasmanian for six months before returning to Sydney. He died there on 6 April 1863.
