= The Sydney Gazette =

Australian 19th century newspaper

The Sydney Gazette and New South Wales Advertiser
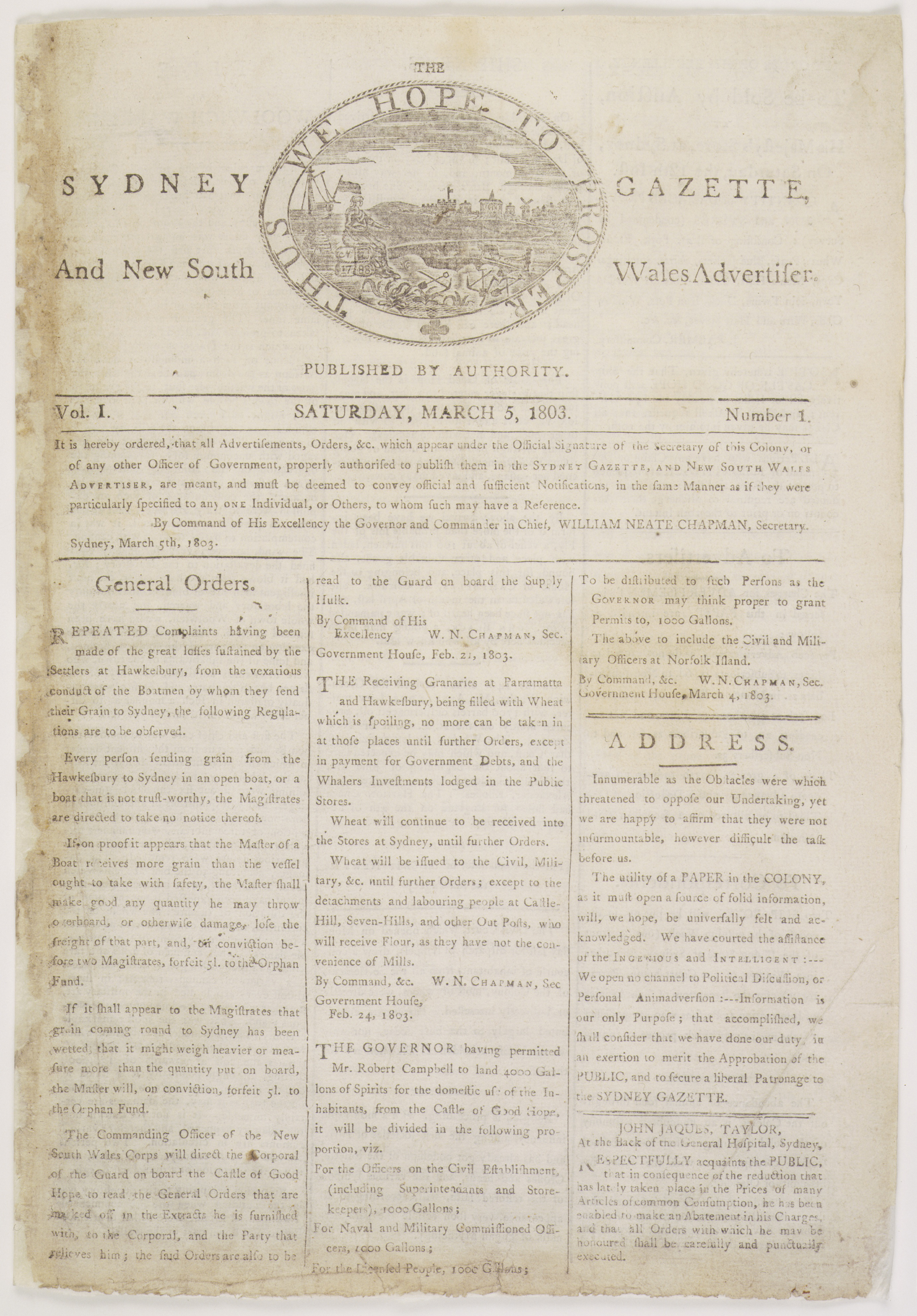
- The first issue of The Sydney Gazette and New South Wales Advertiser, 5 March 1803
- Founded: 5 March 1803
- Ceased publication: 20 October 1842
- Language: English
- City: Sydney, Australia

The Sydney Gazette and New South Wales Advertiser was the first newspaper printed in Australia, running from 5 March 1803 until 20 October 1842. It was a semi-official publication of the government of New South Wales, authorised by Governor Philip King and printed by George Howe. On 14 October 1824, under the editorship of Robert Howe, it ceased to be censored by the colonial government.

== Printing press ==
When the eleven vessels of the First Fleet of settlers reached New South Wales in January 1788, among the cargo aboard was a small second-hand printing press intended for printing general orders, regulations and official proclamations in the new penal settlement. Seven years went by before someone was found who could work the press. This was convict George Hughes, who used it to print more than 200 government orders between 1795 and 1799. Australia's first printer also used the press to produce playbills for theatrical performances in Sydney in March and April 1800, and he also appeared as an actor in these plays. He was replaced as government printer by George Howe, who arrived in the colony on 22 November 1800. He had worked as a printer before being convicted of shoplifting in 1799 and sentenced to transportation.

Among other things, Howe printed New South Wales Standing Orders (1802), the first book published in Australia.

In 1803, Governor King wrote a despatch to Lord Hobart in which he explained that,

It being desirable that the settlers and inhabitants at large should be benefited by useful information being dispersed among them, I considered that a weekly publication would greatly facilitate that design, for which purpose I gave permission to an ingenious man, who manages the Government printing press, to collect materials weekly, which, being inspected by an officer, is published in the form of a weekly newspaper.

== Mission ==
The introductory address, by Howe, was published on the first page in the third column. It read:

ADDRESS

Innumerable as the Obstacles were which threatened to oppose our Undertaking, yet we are happy to affirm that they were not insurmountable, however difficult the task before us.

The utility of a PAPER in the COLONY, as it must open a source of solid information, will we hope, be universally felt and acknowledged, We have courted the assistance of the INGENIOUS and INTELLIGENT :--- We open no channel to Political Discussion, or Personal Animadversion :--- Information is our only purpose; that accomplished, we shall consider that we have done our duty, in an exertion to merit the Approbation of the PUBLIC, and to secure a liberal Patronage to the Sydney Gazette.

— The Sydney Gazette and New South Wales Advertiser, 5 March 1803

== Editors ==
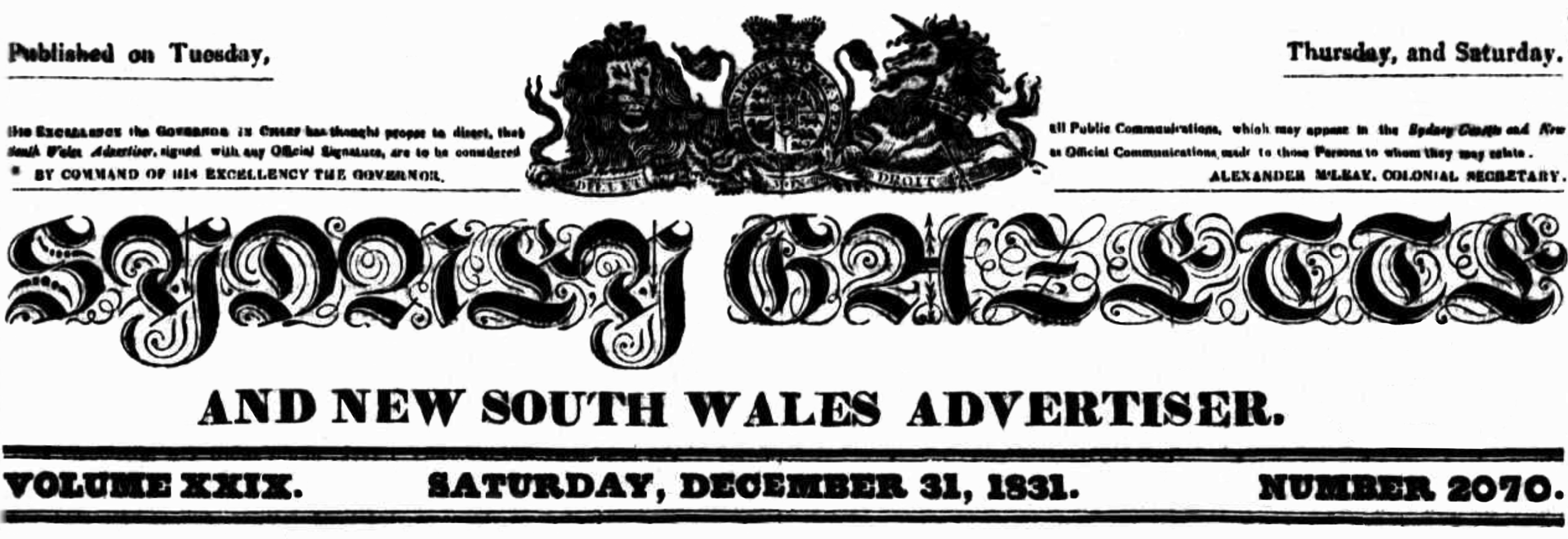
The masthead in December 1831

The newspaper's original editor, typesetter and printer was George Howe, who had been transported to New South Wales for shoplifting in 1800. After Howe's death in 1821, the Gazette was printed by his son, Robert, until he drowned in a boating accident in Port Jackson in 1829.

The business then passed to Robert's co-editor and friend Ralph Mansfield. Mansfield soon left the Gazette, and was replaced by a series of short-term editors including Edward O'Shaughnessy, George Thomas Graham and Horatio Wills, Robert Howe's apprentice and step-brother. Frederick Crewe Haswell was followed by Atwell Edwin Hayes in January 1836. Hayes had earlier been the editor of The Australian.

From 1833, the paper was nominally edited by Ann Howe, Robert's widow, but managed by O'Shaughnessy and later William Watt, a ticket of leave convict whom Anne later married. After Watt's banishment to Port Macquarie in 1835, ownership of the Gazette passed to Richard Jones, co-executor to Robert Howe's estate. Jones helped establish Robert Charles Howe, Howe's eldest illegitimate son, as the legal owner.

Howe sold the newspaper in 1841 to Patrick Grant. Its final editor, from 2 August 1842, was Richard Sanderson.

== Production ==
The Gazette was printed alongside government orders, rules and regulations on a small printing press and used type brought to the colony by Governor Phillip in January 1788. It was initially printed as a single sheet, folded into four pages of foolscap size, with each page typeset in three columns. In appearance, it resembled The London Gazette. Its masthead was a locally produce woodcut of Sydney and carried the imprimatur 'Published by Authority'. For a long time the wood-cut depicted a female figure seated on a bale surrounded by the words, "Thus we hope to prosper". On 24 June 1804, this woodcut was replaced by another which represented the royal arms. Editorial independence was not an option when the printing press was located in Government House, used government ink and printed on government paper.

The scarcity of type in the Colony was shown by the fact that the capital W in "Wales", and the capital A in "Advertiser" were formed using inverted Vs. In addition the lack of paper meant the quality of the publication was extremely variable and led to the printer sending out numerous requests for Spanish paper to enable him to complete his work.

In May 1803, Howe successfully requested new type and additional engravings to replace the worn type that had been used previously. The printing materials were further upgraded by Howe's son, when he enlarged the newspaper to Demy size in 1824.

From the 5 March 1803, and for some time afterwards, the Gazette was published weekly. The sixth edition was published on Sunday 10 April 1803 and for the next seven years continued to be issued on that day. From the 29 September 1825, the Gazette was issued weekly, after which it was published bi-weekly until 30 December 1826. For six weeks, from 1 January to 10 February 1827, it appeared daily, but the postal service could not accommodate this schedule.

The last issue of the Gazette appeared on 23 December 1843.

== Discontinuation of long s ==
When the newspaper first began publishing in 1803 the use of the long s was still in use by books and newspapers across English speaking countries.

The masthead (known as a nameplate in American English) last used the long s on the edition on Sunday 17 June 1804, reading as:

THE SYDNEY GAZETTE And New South Wales Advertiſer

The next week's edition on the Sunday 24 June 1804 introduced a new masthead with the modern s, reading as:

THE Sydney Gazette AND NEW SOUTH WALES ADVERTISER

The articles within the newspaper, however, continued to use the long s for just over eight more years with declining usage. The apparent last edition that used the long s was on 27 June 1812, reading as:

ON SALE, at reduced Prices, for Ready Money, the valuable Inveſtment, imported per Brig Eagle, Captain McLardie; conſiſting of sugar by the bag; Souchong Tea by the cheſt, weight 82lbs; coarſe Calico by the bale; coarſe Gurrahs by the ditto; fine India Prints by the ditto; Bengal Boots and Shoes; beſt Dara Soap in hogſheads; Bourbon Coffee by the bag; and a Quantity of empty Gunny Bags. Application to be made to Mr. Robert Campbell, jun. at his Office, No. 15, Hunter- ſtreet, Sydney.

The next edition on 4 July 1812 has no articles that use it and later editions appear to be the same.

== Legacy ==
The Sydney Gazette was the first newspaper published in Australia. Although subject of government censorship in its early years, it went on to be a typical newspaper of the period and contains much information about New South Wales in the first half of the 19th century available nowhere else. As such, it continues to serve the public as a unique source for the study of Australian history.

== Digitisation ==
The paper has been digitised as part of the Australian Newspapers Digitisation Program project of the National Library of Australia.

== See also ==
- List of newspapers in Australia
- List of newspapers in New South Wales
- Michael Massey Robinson
