= Grosvenor Place (Sydney) =

Skyscraper in Sydney, Australia

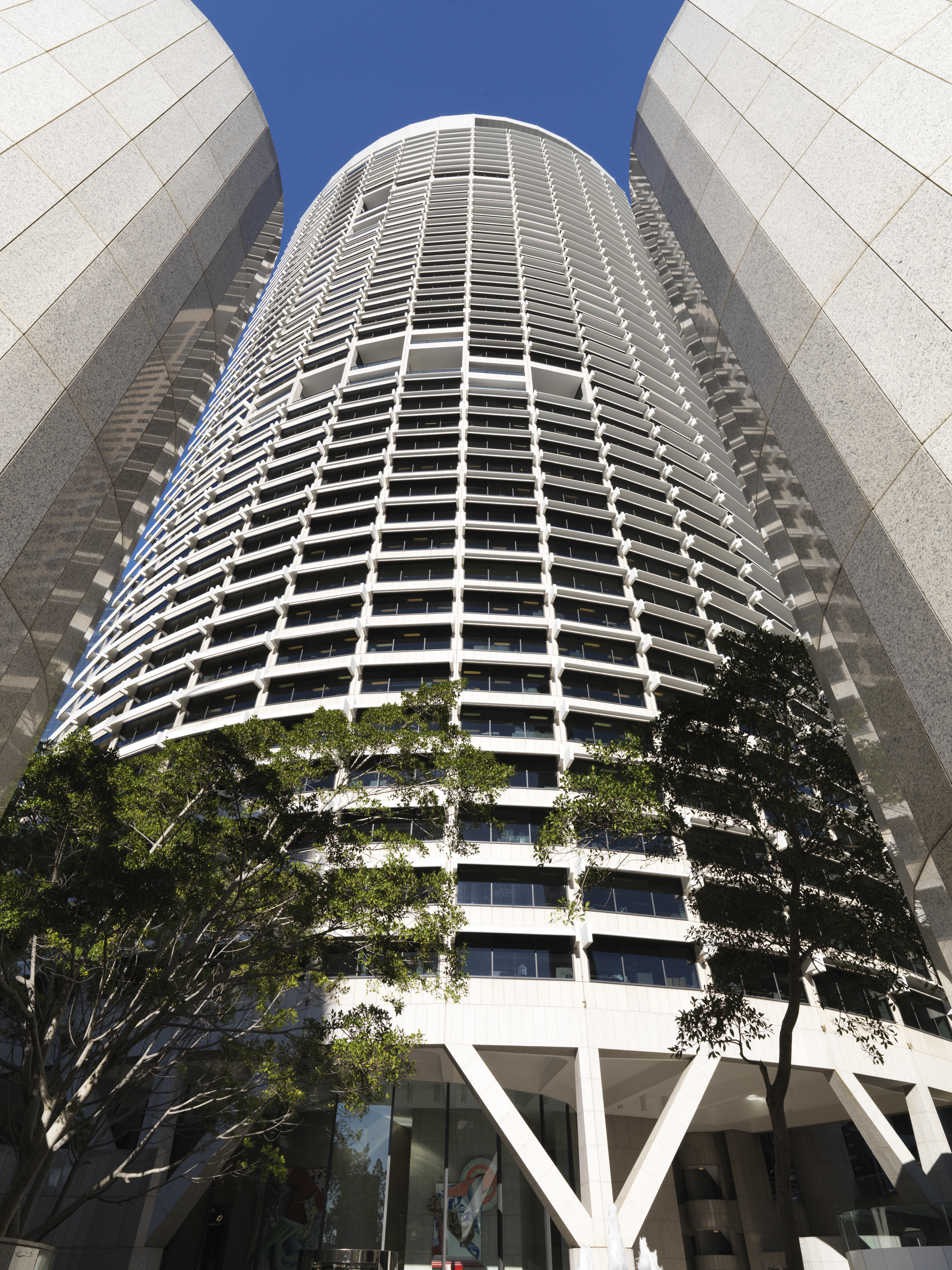
- Grosvenor Place tower
- Interactive map of the Grosvenor Place area

General information
- Status: Completed
- Type: office
- Location: 225 George Street, Sydney
- Coordinates: 33.8629°S 151.2070°E
- Opening: 1988
- Cost: $350 million
- Owner: Superannuation Fund Investment Trust and GPT Group

Height
- Roof: 180 m (590 ft)

Technical details
- Floor count: 44
- Floor area: 90,000 m^{2} (970,000 sq ft)
- Lifts/elevators: 24

Design and construction
- Architect: Harry Seidler & Associates
- Structural engineer: Ove Arup & Partners
- Main contractor: Concrete Constructions

Grosvenor Place is a commercial office tower in George Street, Sydney, Australia, which was designed by renowned architect Harry Seidler. The building provides office space on the south-eastern edge of the city centre suburb of The Rocks, adjacent to the northern limits of Sydney's CBD; it is 180 metres tall and contains 44 floors. Current tenants include Colliers, Sonic Healthcare, Ord Minnett, Wotton Kearney, Grant Thornton, Toyota Finance and Alinta. Grosvenor Place is owned by Commonwealth Superannuation Corporation (managed by Arcadia) and The GPT Group, each with 50%.

== Description ==
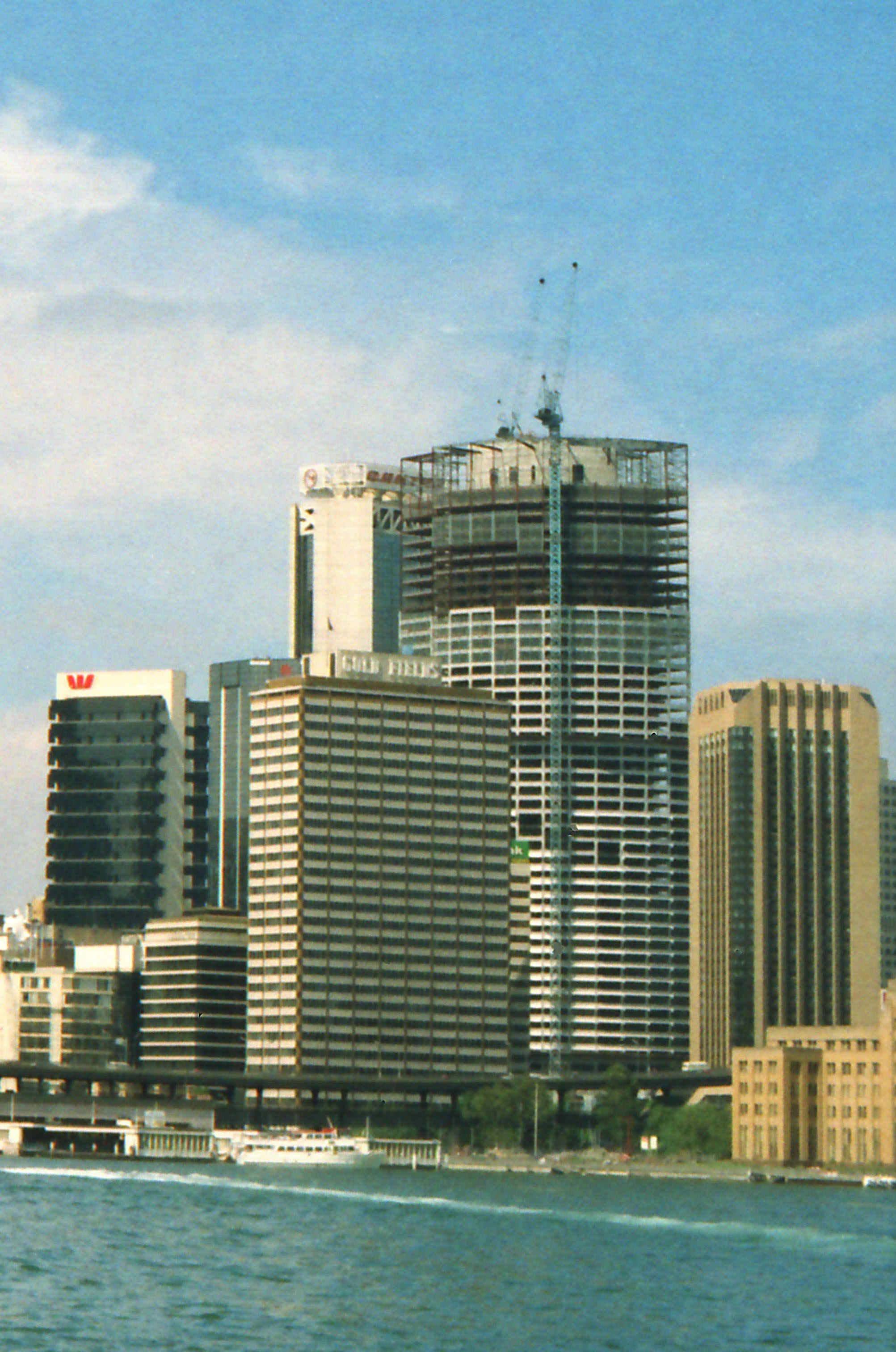
The building under construction in 1987.

The building occupies an entire block in Sydney's city centre suburb of the Rocks, bounded by George Street, Essex Street and Grosvenor Street (after which the building is named). As well as the modernist office tower facing George Street, the complex includes the Johnsons Building and Royal Naval House – two low-set heritage significant buildings in Grosvenor Street. There is a diagonal path for pedestrians, which runs between the heritage buildings and the main tower.

The premium grade office tower was designed by Harry Seidler & Associates. In 1989, Grosvenor Place won the RAIA Lustig & Moar National Prize and the 1991 Sulman Award.

Grosvenor Place was instigated by Bob Hammond who stipulated that the building must generate long term value. This mandate was realised through the design of a large, open floor design; incorporating column-free floor plates, each floor spanning 2,000 square metres (22,000 square feet). This allows tenants to occupy complete levels and provides an uninterrupted space that can be custom designed by tenants.

== Design ==
The form of the tower features two crescents with an elliptical central core. The positioning and orientation of Grosvenor Place's two quadrants was chosen to maximise views over Sydney Harbour, Sydney Harbour Bridge and Sydney Opera House down George Street.

Structurally the building consists of a concrete core with steel beams and prefabricated granite facades. Each floor contains 2,000 m^{2} (22,000 ft^{2}) of space, providing a total floor area of 90,000 m^{2} (970,000 ft^{2}).

Grosvenor Place's lobby contains Pillars & Cones, an artwork by American minimalist, Frank Stella. The building also houses a five-level basement carpark, al-fresco and internal restaurants and bars.

== See also ==
- Buildings and architecture of Sydney
- List of tallest buildings in Sydney
