= Grosvenor Street =

Street in Sydney, Australia

Grosvenor Street, Sydney New South Wales
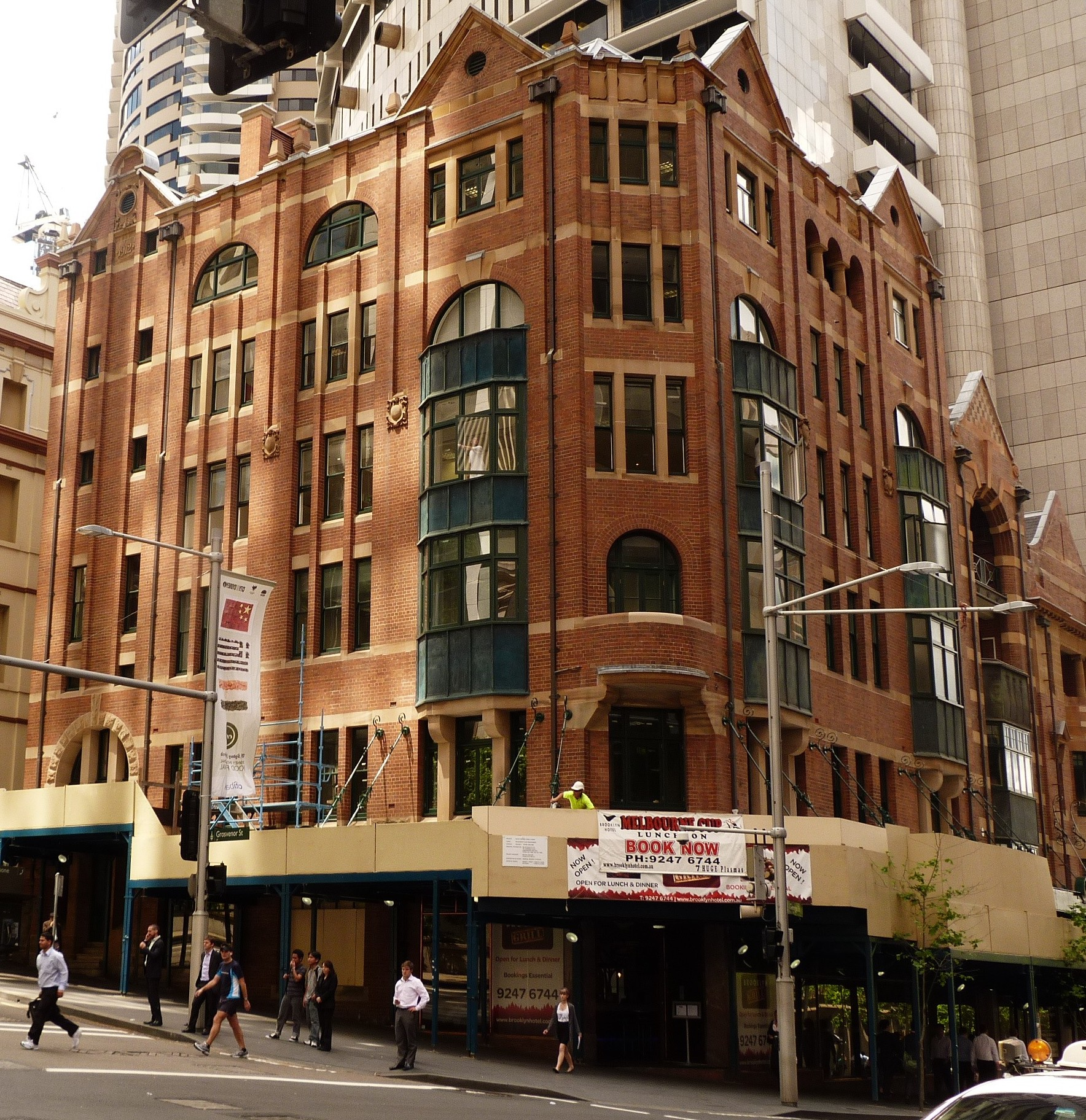
- Johnson's Building, located on Grosvenor Street

General information
- Type: Street
- Length: 350 m (1,100 ft)

Major junctions
- West end: York Street; Bradfield Highway; Sydney CBD
- East end: George Street; Sydney CBD

Location(s)
- Suburb(s): Sydney CBD

Grosvenor Street is a street in the central business district of Sydney in New South Wales, Australia. Grosvenor Street runs 350 metres (1,150 ft) in an east to west direction, with traffic flowing in both directions. The eastern terminus is at George Street and the western terminus is at the junction of York Street with the Bradfield Highway. There are no major cross streets.

Originally named Charlotte Square by Governor Macquarie in 1810 in honour of Queen Charlotte, Grosvenor Street was renamed in 1889 after the Grosvenor Hotel that was located at the intersection of Grosvenor and Cumberland Streets.

== Points of interest ==
- Grosvenor Place – This is a high-rise development designed by architect Harry Seidler and built in 1982–1987. It occupies the block bounded by Grosvenor, George, Harrington and Essex Streets. The front foyer houses a number of paintings by the American artist Frank Stella.
- Johnson's Building – Constructed in 1912, the Johnson's Building is a six storey Edwardian brick-clad building in the Federation Free Classical architectural style, located at 233–235 George Street, The Rocks, on the corner of Gloucester Street. The building was designed by Walter Liberty Vernon, a former NSW Government architect. It is part of a group which has been listed on the NSW State Heritage Register. It was restored as part of the Grosvenor Place development and was adapted for use as a hotel.
- Royal Naval House – Also of the Federation Free Classical style, this building was designed by Varney Parkes and built between 1890 and 1907. Initially used by the Royal Australian Navy as accommodation and amenities for naval personnel, the building is currently used as part of the Sydney Futures Exchange. It is located next door to Federation Hall and courtyard and was restored along with that building. It is also listed on the NSW State Heritage Register.
- Federation Hall and courtyard – Constructed in the late Victorian style between 1889 and 1891, the Federation Hall and courtyard is located at 24-30 Grosvenor Street and is currently used as the Sydney Futures Exchange. The building was extended substantially from 1923–1924 and was at one stage known as the Meat Board Building. It is located next door to Royal Naval House and was restored along with that building. It is also listed on the NSW State Heritage Register.
- St Patrick's Catholic Church – This church was designed by J. F. Hilly and built 1840–1844. Founded by Father Therry, it was the first Catholic church in Sydney and became the central church for the Irish community.
- Presbytery – Situated next to St Patrick's, the presbytery was designed by Hennessy and Hennessy and built in 1914. It features the "blood and bandages" style composed of red bricks with contrasting white areas, and was influenced by British architects Mackintosh and Voysey.
- Lang Park – This park is a roughly triangular site situated on the corner of Grosvenor and York Streets.

== Gallery ==
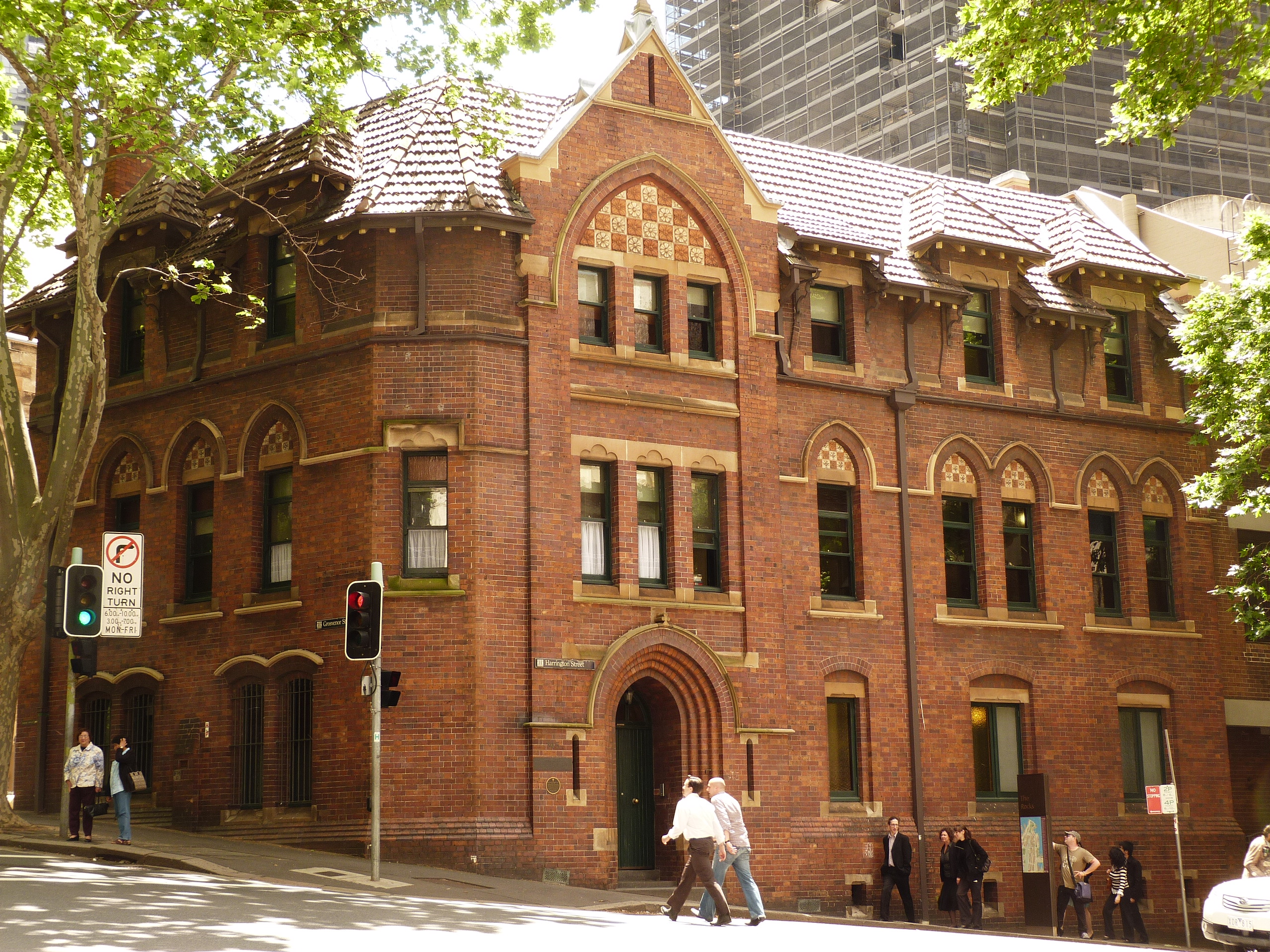
St Patricks Presbytery

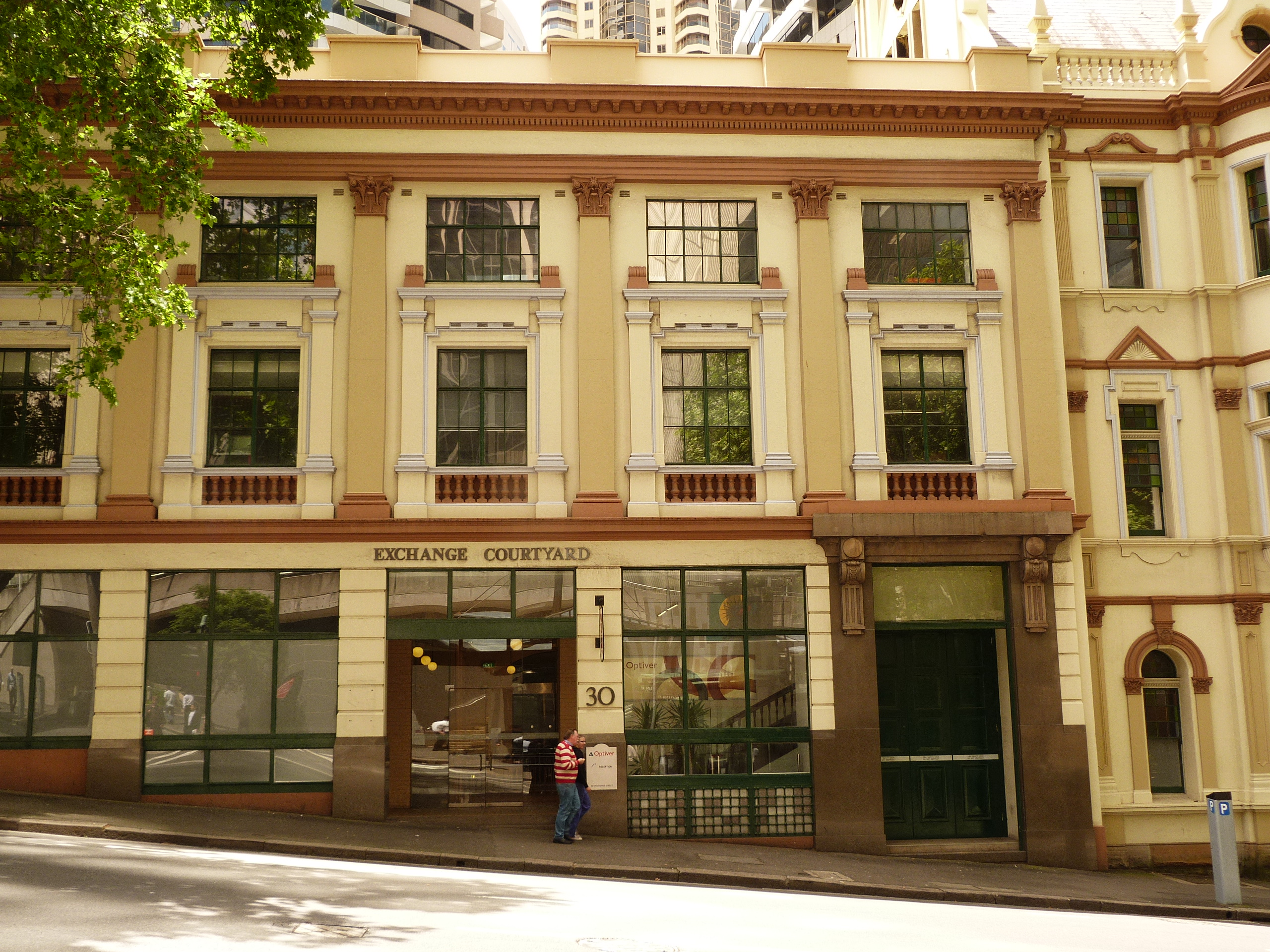
Exchange Courtyard

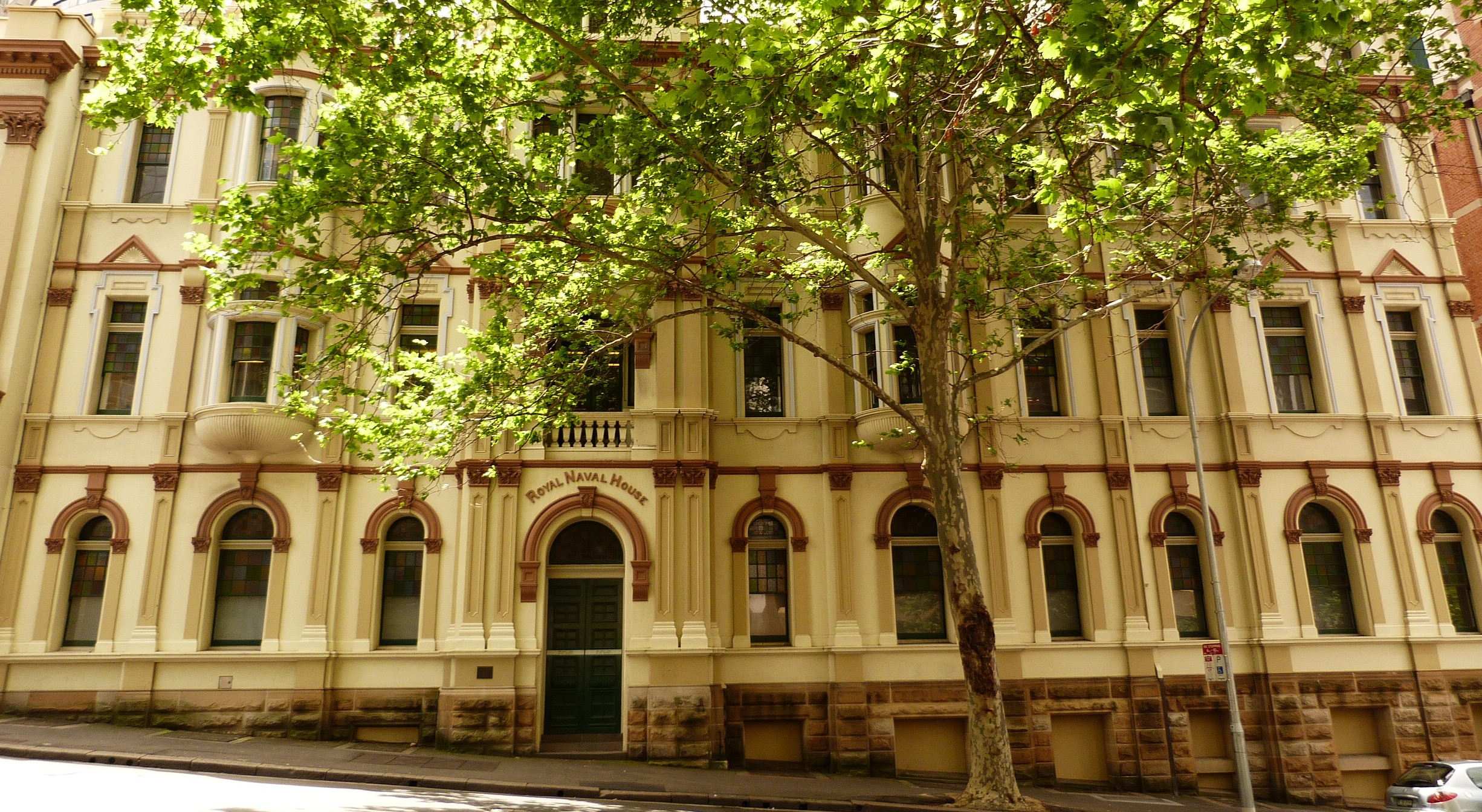
Royal Naval House

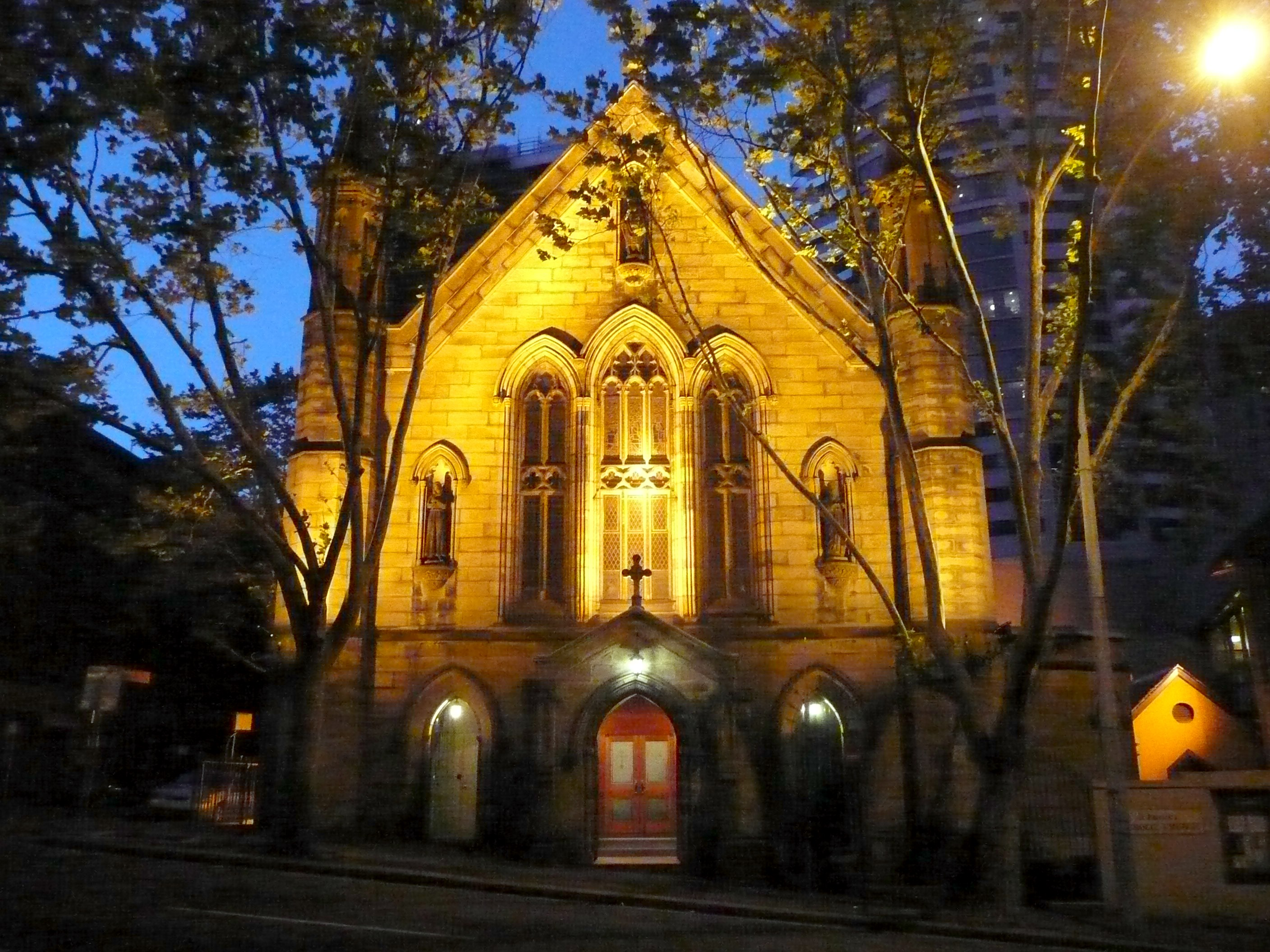
St Patrick's Church
