= Oti =

Oti or OTI may refer to:

== Places ==
- Oti, Jõgeva County, a village in Jõgeva Parish, Estonia
- Oti, Saare County, a village in Saaremaa Parish, Estonia
- Oti, Viljandi County, a village in Mulgi Parish, Estonia
- Oti Prefecture, Togo
- Oti Region, Ghana
- Oti River, which flows through Benin, Togo, and Ghana

== People ==
=== Given name or nickname ===
- Oti (footballer) (born 1969), Spanish footballer
- Oti Akenteng (born 1955), Ghanaian footballer
- Oti Mabuse (born 1990), a South African professional Latin American and ballroom dancer

=== Surname ===
- Chijioke Oti, Anglican bishop in Nigeria
- Chris Oti (born 1965), English rugby union player
- Martin Gyarko Oti (born 1980), Ghanaian politician
- Nnenna Oti (born 1958), Nigerian academic
- Patteson Oti (born 1956), Solomon Islands politician and diplomat
- Manuel Mur Oti (1908–2003), Spanish screenwriter and film director
- Oti maraji, an emerging Nigerian Artist.

== Education ==
- Oklahoma Technology Institute, in Oklahoma City, Oklahoma, United States
- Ottawa Torah Institute, in Ottawa, Ontario, Canada

== Other uses ==
- Leo Wattimena Airport (IATA: OTI), on Morotai Island, North Maluku, Indonesia
- New York City Office of Technology and Innovation
- Ocean transportation intermediary
- Object Technology International, a Canadian software company founded in 1988 and acquired by IBM in 1996
- Office of Transition Initiatives, part of the United States Agency for International Development
- On Thin Ice (comedy group), a Harvard University improvisation comedy troupe
- On Track Innovations, an Israeli financial services company
- Open Technology Institute, a technology program of the New America Foundation
- Organización de Telecomunicaciones de Iberoamérica, an organization of television networks in Latin America, Spain and Portugal
- OTI Festival, an annual singing competition
- Oti Fossae, on Mars
- Oti language, an extinct language of Brazil
