= Balfour Williamson =

Shipping company based in Liverpool, England

Balfour, Williamson & Co Limited
- Type: Private
- Founded: 1851; 175 years ago
- Defunct: 1997; 29 years ago

Balfour Williamson & Co was a shipping company based in Liverpool, England, and later an export confirming house and freight forwarding company. Latterly a subsidiary of Lonmin (formerly Lonrho). In October 2016 the company returned to family ownership when acquired by Guthrie Williamson, the great-great-great-grandson of the founder Stephen Williamson.

The company was founded in 1851 by two young men from Fife, Scotland, Alexander Balfour and Stephen Williamson. They were joined for a time by a third partner, David Duncan. The company traded with South America, and had offices in Valparaíso, Chile and San Francisco.

Williamson and Duncan were responsible for the company's operations in Chile, which thrived. A subsidiary was set up in Chile, the Williamson-Balfour Company, which was involved in many activities, most notably in sheep farming on Easter Island between 1897 and 1953.

The company's first ship was the Gardner, soon replaced by the Santiago, a 455-ton barque. The Santiago was sold in 1888, and later the hulk was used as a coal store in Adelaide, Australia, where it still lies. A later ship, the San Rafael caught fire off Cape Horn in December 1874 with the loss of 19 and 5 survivors who spent 27 days in an open boat

== Collections ==
Balfour Williamson & Co's archives were deposited with University College London (UCL) between 1977 and 1979. The collection includes correspondence, legal and financial records, histories, and photographs. UCL also holds papers belonging to William Ritchie Henderson, a partner of the company.

== See also ==
Wallis Hunt, Heirs to Great Adventure, the History of Balfour Williamson & Company, Vol. 1 1851-1901 (1951) London; Vol. 2 1901-1951 (1960) London.
