= Standard trading conditions =

Standard Trading Conditions (STC) are standardized terms imposed by some countries for accepting cargo by shipping lines, airlines and logistics services providers like freight forwarders and customs agents. They are usually printed as the fine print behind the shipping documents like bill of lading, air way bill, or consignment note. These standard trading conditions state the general contract terms and conditions between the two contracting parties who do a contract of transportation or storage or otherwise handling of goods.

They are often based on the standardized trading rules suggested by FIATA.
