= BIFA =

BIFA may refer to:

- British Independent Film Awards
- British International Freight Association
- Black imported fire ant
