= New Imperialism =

Colonial expansion in late 19th and early 20th centuries

In historical contexts, New Imperialism characterizes a period of colonial expansion primarily by the major Western powers as well as the Empire of Japan, during the late 19th and early 20th centuries. The period featured an unprecedented pursuit of overseas territorial acquisitions. At the time, states focused on building their empires with new technological advances and developments, expanding their territory through conquest, and exploiting the resources of the subjugated countries. During the era of New Imperialism, the European powers (and Japan) individually conquered almost all of Africa and parts of Asia. The new wave of imperialism reflected ongoing rivalries among the great powers, the economic desire for new resources and markets, and a "civilizing mission" ethos. Many of the colonies established during this era gained independence during the era of decolonization that followed World War II.

The qualifier "new" is used to differentiate modern imperialism from earlier imperial activity, such as the formation of ancient empires and the first wave of European colonization.

The main participants in New Imperialism were the United Kingdom, France, Germany, Italy, the Netherlands, Belgium, Portugal, Russia, the United States, and Japan.

== Rise ==
The American Revolutionary War (1775–1783) and the collapse of the Spanish Empire in Latin America in the 1820s ended the first era of European imperialism. Especially in Great Britain these revolutions helped show the deficiencies of mercantilism, the doctrine of economic competition for finite wealth which had supported earlier imperial expansion. In 1846, the Corn Laws were repealed and manufacturers grew, as the regulations enforced by the Corn Laws had slowed their businesses. With the repeal in place, the manufacturers were able to trade more freely. Thus, Britain began to adopt the concept of free trade.

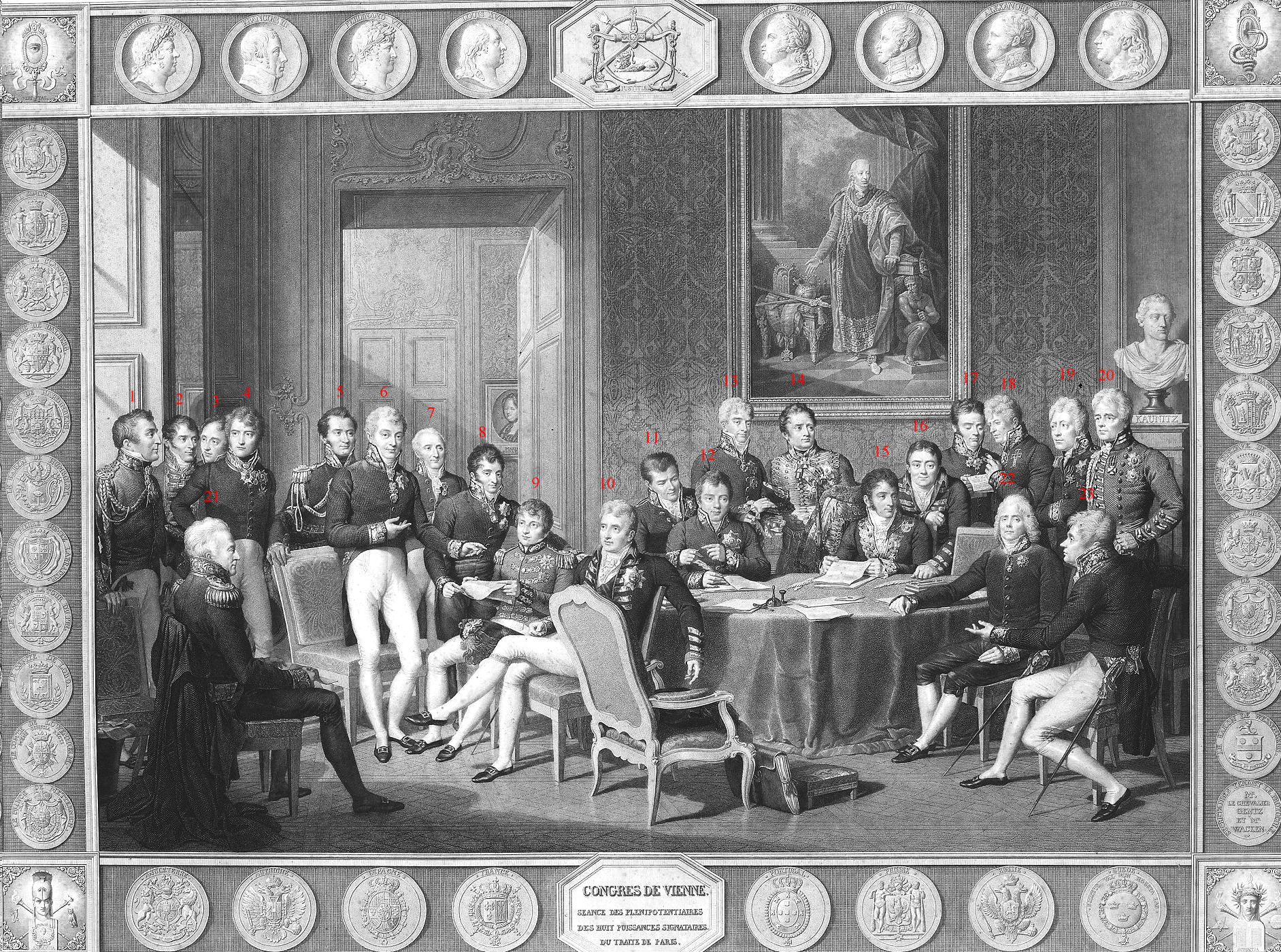
The Congress of Vienna by Jean-Baptiste Isabey (1819). The congress was actually a series of face-to-face meetings between colonial powers. It served to divide and reappropriate imperial holdings.

During this period, between the 1815 Congress of Vienna after the defeat of Napoleonic France and Imperial Germany's victory in the Franco-Prussian War in 1871, Great Britain reaped the benefits of being Europe's dominant military and economic power. As the "workshop of the world", Britain could produce finished goods so efficiently that they could usually undersell comparable, locally manufactured goods in foreign markets, supplying a large share of the manufactured goods consumed by such nations as the German states, France, Belgium, and the United States.

The erosion of British hegemony after the Franco-Prussian War, in which a coalition of German states led by Prussia soundly defeated the Second French Empire, was occasioned by changes in the European and world economies and in the continental balance of power following the breakdown of the Concert of Europe, established by the Congress of Vienna. The establishment of nation-states in Germany and Italy resolved territorial issues that had kept potential rivals embroiled in internal affairs at the heart of Europe to Britain's advantage. The years from 1871 to 1914 would be marked by an extremely unstable peace. France's determination to recover Alsace-Lorraine, annexed by Germany as a result of the Franco-Prussian War, and Germany's mounting imperialist ambitions would keep the two nations constantly poised for conflict.

This competition was sharpened by the Long Depression of 1873–1896, a prolonged period of price deflation punctuated by severe business downturns, which put pressure on governments to promote home industry, leading to the widespread abandonment of free trade among Europe's powers (in Germany from 1879 and in France from 1881).

=== Berlin Conference ===
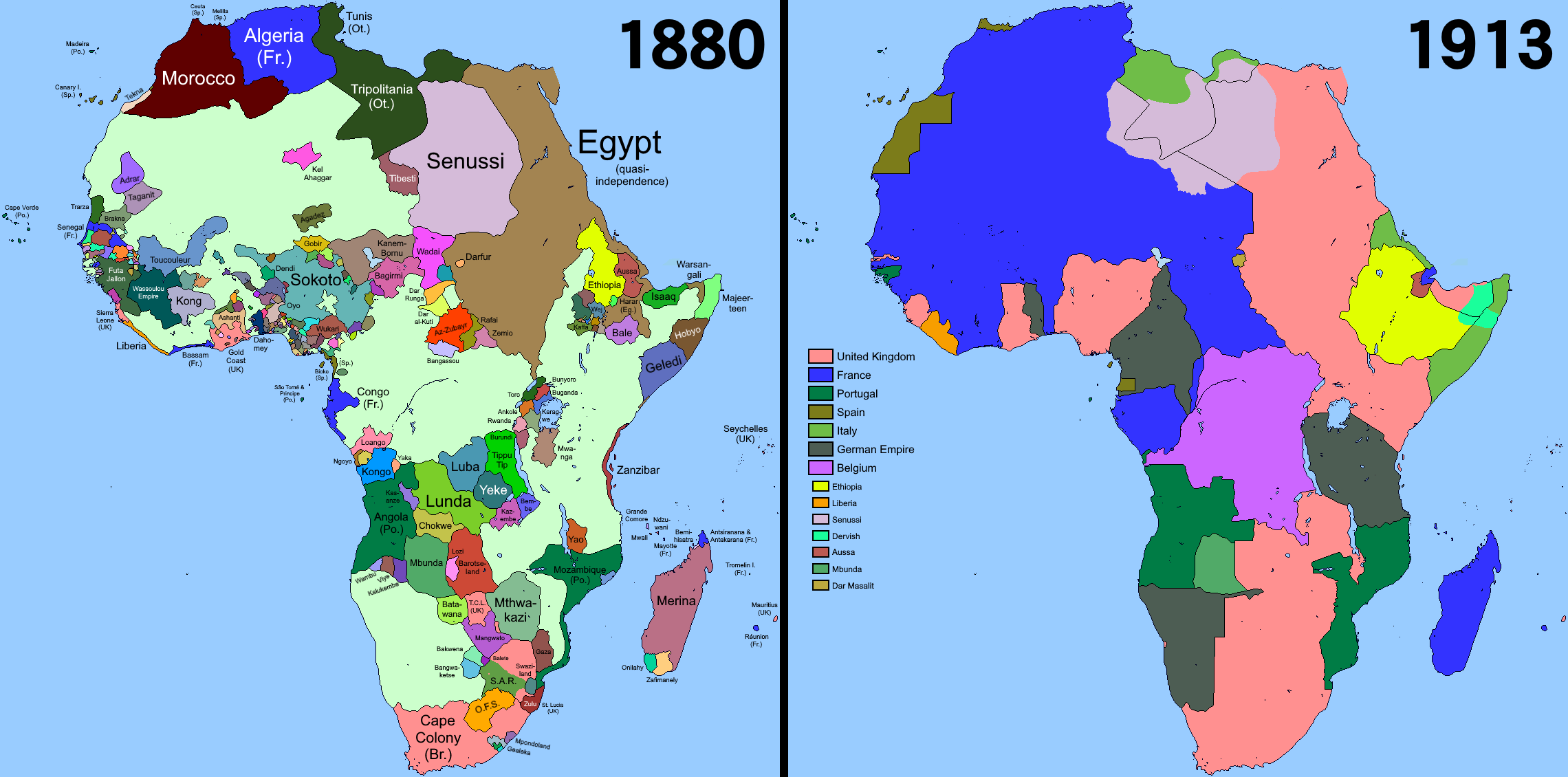
Comparison of Africa in the years 1880 and 1913

The Berlin Conference of 1884–1885 sought to destroy the competition between the powers by defining "effective occupation" as the criterion for international recognition of a territory claim, specifically in Africa. The imposition of direct rule in terms of "effective occupation" necessitated routine recourse to armed force against indigenous states and peoples. Uprisings against imperial rule were put down ruthlessly, most brutally in the Herero Wars in German South-West Africa from 1904 to 1907 and the Maji Maji Rebellion in German East Africa from 1905 to 1907. One of the goals of the conference was to reach agreements over trade, navigation, and boundaries of Central Africa. However, of all of the 15 nations in attendance of the Berlin Conference, none of the countries represented were African.

The main dominating powers of the conference were France, Germany, Britain, and Portugal. They remapped Africa without considering the cultural and linguistic borders that were already established. At the end of the conference, Africa was divided into 50 different colonies. The attendants established who was in control of each of these newly divided colonies. They also planned, noncommittally, to end the slave trade in Africa.

=== Britain during the era ===
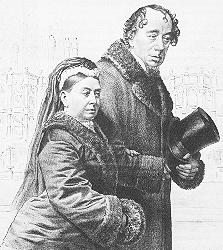
British Prime Minister Benjamin Disraeli and Queen Victoria

In Britain, the age of new imperialism marked a time for significant economic changes. Because the country was the first to industrialize, Britain was technologically ahead of many other countries throughout the majority of the nineteenth century. By the end of the nineteenth century, however, other countries, chiefly Germany and the United States, began to challenge Britain's technological and economic power. After several decades of monopoly, the country was battling to maintain a dominant economic position while other powers became more involved in international markets. In 1870, Britain contained 31.8% of the world's manufacturing capacity while the United States contained 23.3% and Germany contained 13.2%. By 1910, Britain's manufacturing capacity had dropped to 14.7%, while that of the United States had risen to 35.3% and that of Germany to 15.9%. As countries like Germany and America became more economically successful, they began to become more involved with imperialism, resulting in the British struggling to maintain the volume of British trade and investment overseas.

Britain further faced strained international relations with three expansionist powers (Japan, Germany, and Italy) during the early twentieth century. Before 1939, these three powers never directly threatened Britain itself, but the dangers to the Empire were clear. By the 1930s, Britain was worried that Japan would threaten its holdings in the Far East as well as territories in India, Australia and New Zealand. Italy held an interest in North Africa, which threatened British Egypt, and German dominance of the European continent held some danger for Britain's security. Britain worried that the expansionist powers would cause the breakdown of international stability; as such, British foreign policy attempted to protect the stability in a rapidly changing world. With its stability and holdings threatened, Britain decided to adopt a policy of concession rather than resistance, a policy that became known as appeasement.

In Britain, the era of new imperialism affected public attitudes toward the idea of imperialism itself. Most of the public believed that if imperialism was going to exist, it was best if Britain was the driving force behind it. The same people further thought that British imperialism was a force for good in the world. In 1940, the Fabian Colonial Research Bureau argued that Africa could be developed both economically and socially, but until this development could happen, Africa was best off remaining with the British Empire. Rudyard Kipling's 1891 poem, "The English Flag," contains the stanza:

Winds of the World, give answer! They are whimpering to and fro--
And what should they know of England who only England know?--
The poor little street-bred people that vapour and fume and brag,
They are lifting their heads in the stillness to yelp at the English Flag!

These lines show Kipling's belief that the British who actively took part in imperialism knew more about British national identity than the ones whose entire lives were spent solely in the imperial metropolis. While there were pockets of anti-imperialist opposition in Britain in the late nineteenth and early twentieth centuries, resistance to imperialism was nearly nonexistent in the country as a whole. In many ways, this new form of imperialism formed a part of the British identity until the end of the era of new imperialism with the Second World War.

== Socioeconomic implications ==
While Social Darwinism became popular throughout Western Europe and the United States, the paternalistic French and Portuguese "civilizing mission" (in French: mission civilisatrice; in Portuguese: Missão civilizadora) appealed to many European statesmen both in and outside France. Despite the apparent benevolence existing in the notion of the "White Man's Burden", the unintended consequences of imperialism might have greatly outweighed the potential benefits. Governments became increasingly paternalistic at home and neglected the individual liberties of their citizens. Military spending expanded, usually leading to an "imperial overreach", and imperialism created clients of ruling elites abroad that were brutal and corrupt, consolidating power through imperial rents and impeding social change and economic development that ran against their ambitions. Furthermore, "nation building" oftentimes created cultural sentiments of racism and xenophobia.

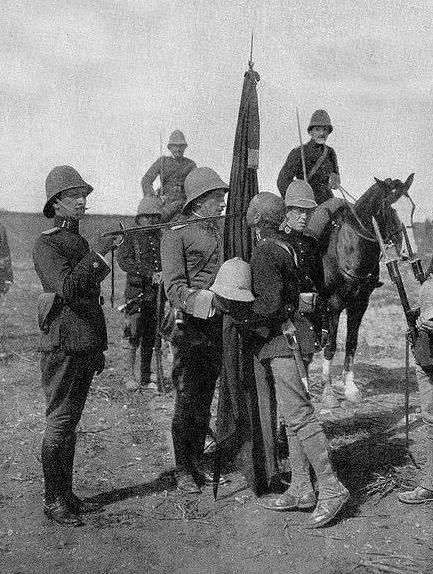
Indigenous African soldier pledging alliance to the Spanish flag. European armies would regularly enlist natives to garrison their own land.

Many of Europe's major elites also found advantages in formal, overseas expansion: large financial and industrial monopolies wanted imperial support to protect their overseas investments against competition and domestic political tensions abroad, bureaucrats sought government offices, military officers desired promotion, and the traditional but waning landed gentries sought increased profits for their investments, formal titles, and high office. Such special interests have perpetuated empire-building throughout history.

The enforcement of mercantilist policies played a role in sustaining New Imperialism. This restricted colonies to trade only with respective metropoles, which strengthened home-country economies. At first through growing chartered companies and later through imperial states themselves, New Imperialism shifted towards the use of free trade, the reduction of market restrictions and tariffs, and the coercion of foreign markets to open up, often through gunboat diplomacy or concerted interventionism, such as police actions.

Observing the rise of trade unionism, socialism, and other protest movements during an era of mass society both in Europe and later in North America, elites sought to use imperial jingoism to co-opt the support of part of the industrial working class. The new mass media promoted jingoism in the Spanish–American War (1898), the Second Boer War (1899–1902), and the Boxer Rebellion (1900). The left-wing German historian Hans-Ulrich Wehler has defined social imperialism as "the diversions outwards of internal tensions and forces of change in order to preserve the social and political status quo", and as a "defensive ideology" to counter the "disruptive effects of industrialization on the social and economic structure of Germany". In Wehler's opinion, social imperialism was a device that allowed the German government to distract public attention from domestic problems and preserve the existing social and political order. The dominant elites used social imperialism as the glue to hold together a fractured society and to maintain popular support for the social status quo. According to Wehler, German colonial policy in the 1880s was the first example of social imperialism in action, and was followed up by the 1897 Tirpitz Plan for expanding the German Navy. In this point of view, groups such as the Colonial Society and the Navy League are seen as instruments for the government to mobilize public support. The demands for annexing most of Europe and Africa in World War I are seen by Wehler as the pinnacle of social imperialism.

== South Asia ==
=== India ===
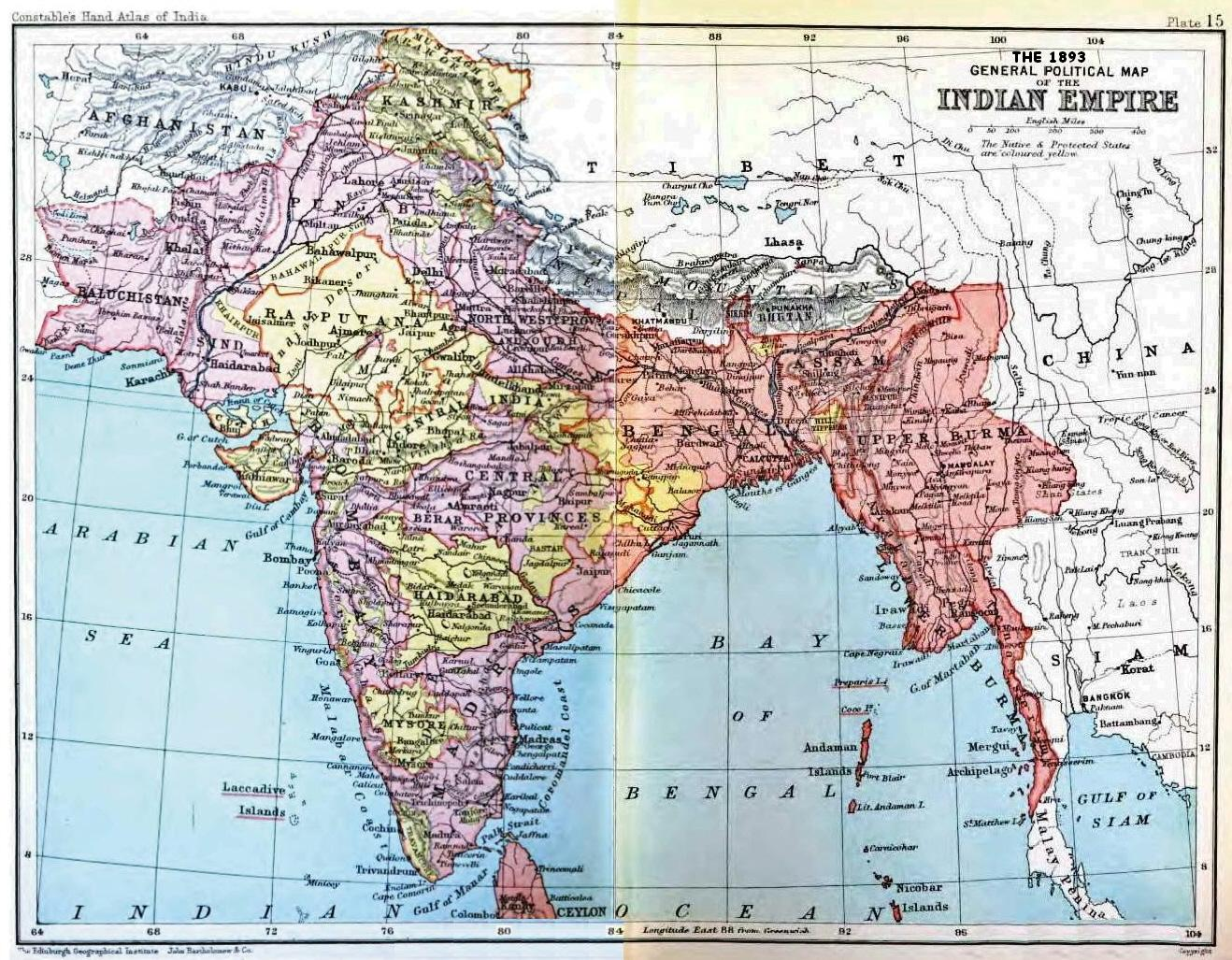
Map of British India

In the 17th century, the British businessmen arrived in India and, after taking a small portion of land, formed the East India Company. The British East India Company annexed most of the subcontinent of India, starting with Bengal in 1757 and ending with Punjab in 1849. Many princely states remained independent. This was aided by a power vacuum formed by the collapse of the Mughal Empire in India and the death of Mughal Emperor Aurangzeb and increased British forces in India because of colonial conflicts with France. The invention of clipper ships in the early 1800s cut the trip to India from Europe in half from 6 months to 3 months; the British also laid cables on the floor of the ocean allowing telegrams to be sent from India and China. In 1818, the British controlled most of the Indian subcontinent and began imposing their ideas and ways on its residents, including different succession laws that allowed the British to take over a state with no successor and gain its land and armies, new taxes, and monopolistic control of industry. The British also collaborated with Indian officials to increase their influence in the region.

Some Hindu and Muslim sepoys rebelled in 1857, resulting in the Indian Rebellion. After this revolt was suppressed by the British, India came under the direct control of the British crown. After the British had gained more control over India, they began changing around the financial state of India. Previously, Europe had to pay for Indian textiles and spices in bullion; with political control, Britain directed farmers to grow cash crops for the company for exports to Europe while India became a market for textiles from Britain. In addition, the British collected huge revenues from land rent and taxes on its acquired monopoly on salt production. Indian weavers were replaced by new spinning and weaving machines and Indian food crops were replaced by cash crops like cotton and tea.

The British also began connecting Indian cities by railroad and telegraph to make travel and communication easier as well as building an irrigation system for increasing agricultural production. When Western education was introduced in India, Indians were quite influenced by it, but the inequalities between the British ideals of governance and their treatment of Indians became clear. In response to this discriminatory treatment, a group of educated Indians established the Indian National Congress, demanding equal treatment and self-governance.

John Robert Seeley, a Cambridge Professor of History, said, "Our acquisition of India was made blindly. Nothing great that has ever been done by Englishmen was done so unintentionally or accidentally as the conquest of India". According to him, the political control of India was not a conquest in the usual sense because it was not an act of a state.

The new administrative arrangement, crowned with Queen Victoria's proclamation as Empress of India in 1876, effectively replaced the rule of a monopolistic enterprise with that of a trained civil service headed by graduates of Britain's top universities. The administration retained and increased the monopolies held by the company. The India Salt Act of 1882 included regulations enforcing a government monopoly on the collection and manufacture of salt; in 1923 a bill was passed doubling the salt tax.

== Southeast Asia ==
After taking control of much of India, the British expanded further into Burma, Malaya, Singapore and Borneo, with these colonies becoming further sources of trade and raw materials for British goods. France annexed all of Vietnam and Cambodia in the 1880s; in the following decade, France completed its Indochinese empire with the annexation of Laos, leaving the kingdom of Siam (now Thailand) with an uneasy independence as a neutral buffer between British and French-ruled lands. The United States laid claim to the Philippines, and after the Spanish–American War, took control of the archipelago as one of its overseas possessions.

=== Indonesia ===
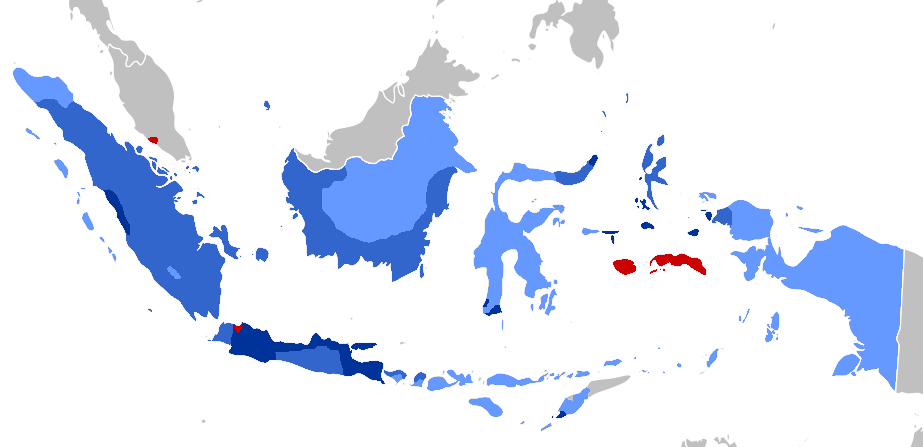
Periodization of VOC territorial expansion, and Dutch East Indies period from 1800: 1600s 1700s 1800s 1900–1942

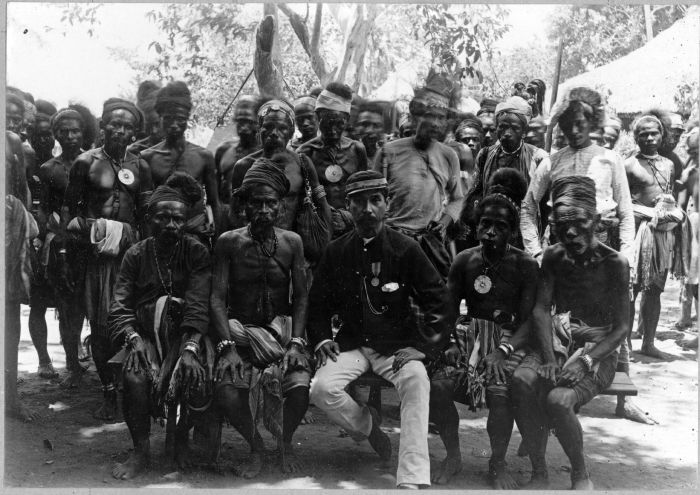
Colonial government official J. Rozet, an Indo Eurasian, in negotiation with tribal chiefs (Roti Islanders), Pariti, Timor, 1896

Formal colonization of the Dutch East Indies (now Indonesia) commenced at the dawn of the 19th century when the Dutch state took possession of all Dutch East India Company (VOC) assets. Before that time the VOC merchants were in principle just another trading power among many, establishing trading posts and settlements (colonies) in strategic places around the archipelago. The Dutch gradually extended their sovereignty over most of the islands in the East Indies. Dutch expansion paused for several years during an interregnum of British rule between 1806 and 1816, when the Dutch Republic was occupied by the French forces of Napoleon. The Dutch government-in-exile in England ceded rule of all its colonies to Great Britain. However, Jan Willem Janssens, the governor of the Dutch East Indies at the time, fought the British before surrendering the colony; he was eventually replaced by Stamford Raffles.

The Dutch East Indies became the prize possession of the Dutch Empire. It was not the typical settler colony founded through massive emigration from the mother countries (such as the USA or Australia) and hardly involved displacement of the indigenous islanders, with a notable and dramatic exception in the island of Banda during the VOC era. Neither was it a plantation colony built on the import of slaves (such as Haiti or Jamaica) or a pure trade post colony (such as Singapore or Macau). It was more of an expansion of the existing chain of VOC trading posts. Instead of mass emigration from the homeland, the sizeable indigenous populations were controlled through effective political manipulation supported by military force. The servitude of the indigenous masses was enabled through a structure of indirect governance, keeping existing indigenous rulers in place. This strategy was already established by the VOC, which independently acted as a semi-sovereign state within the Dutch state, using the Indo Eurasian population as an intermediary buffer.

In 1869, British anthropologist Alfred Russel Wallace described the colonial governing structure in his book "The Malay Archipelago":

"The mode of government now adopted in Java is to retain the whole series of native rulers, from the village chief up to princes, who, under the name of Regents, are the heads of districts about the size of a small English county. With each Regent is placed a Dutch Resident, or Assistant Resident, who is considered to be his "elder brother," and whose "orders" take the form of "recommendations," which are, however, implicitly obeyed. Along with each Assistant, Resident is a Controller, a kind of inspector of all the lower native rulers, who periodically visits every village in the district, examines the proceedings of the native courts, hears complaints against the head-men or other native chiefs, and superintends the Government plantations."

== East Asia ==
=== China ===
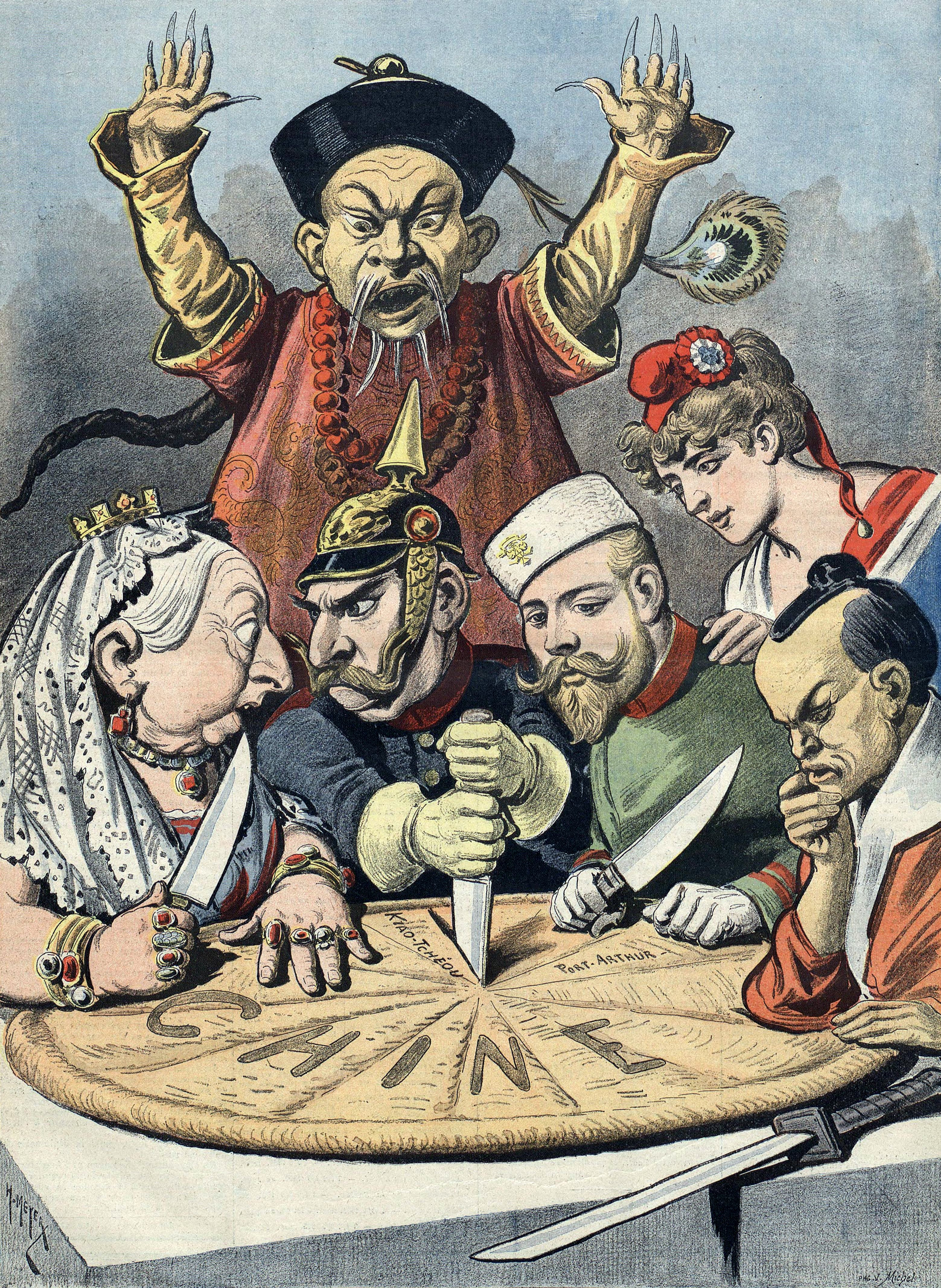
An 1898 French political cartoon depicting Britain, France, Russia, Germany, and Japan dividing China

During the 19th and 20th centuries, foreign powers practiced imperialism in China through the imposition of unequal treaties, opening of treaty ports, and establishment of foreign concessions and leased territories. Starting with the 1842 Treaty of Nanking following the Qing dynasty's defeat by Britain in the First Opium War, various foreign powers, including Britain, France, the United States, Russia, Germany, and Japan, forced China to concede sovereignty and in turn gained territorial, economic, and legal privileges from China. Chinese historians widely include China's subjugation to foreign powers as part of the "century of humiliation."

Within treaty ports, foreign powers controlled enclaves, known as concessions; and gained leases on territories that operated as de facto colonies. Foreign citizens in these areas were granted extraterritoriality, exempting them from Chinese legal jurisdiction in favor of their own consular courts. Foreign powers also maintained their own police forces, military garrisons, and independent taxation systems. The Scramble for China in the late 19th century saw a rapid acceleration of this process, as major powers carved out exclusive spheres of influence across the country, a trend only partially checked by the United States' Open Door Policy.

The foreign presence led to major changes to China's economy and society. Major treaty ports, particularly in Shanghai and Tianjin, became hubs of industrialization, Western education, and international trade. They introduced Western manufacturing, banking systems, and cultural practices to the region. At the same time, the loss of national sovereignty, along with social and legal inequalities between foreigners and natives, sparked Chinese resistance to foreign imperialism resulting in events such as the Boxer Rebellion and May Fourth movement.

The framework of unequal treaties slowly began to diminish after the establishment of the Republic of China. Amidst the Second Sino-Japanese War and World War II in the 1940s, most foreign powers relinquished their extraterritorial rights and concessions. The Chinese Communist Party abolished the remaining concessions after prevailing in the Chinese Civil War, although the final vestiges of foreign imperialism remained until the handover of Hong Kong in 1997 and the handover of Macau in 1999. The legacy of this period has greatly shaped China and is reflected today in its foreign policy, national identity, and economy.

== Central Asia ==
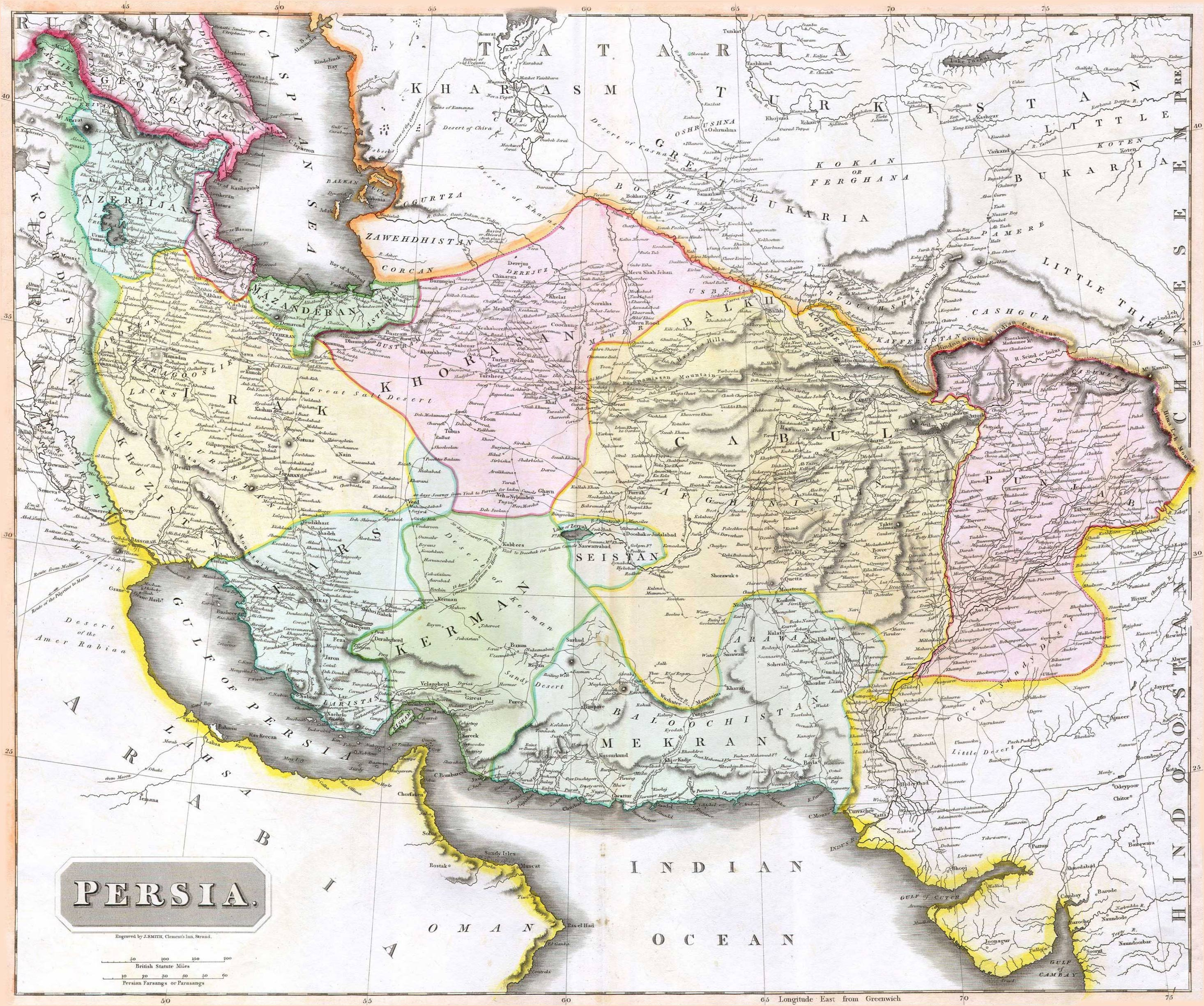
Persia at the beginning of the Great Game in 1814

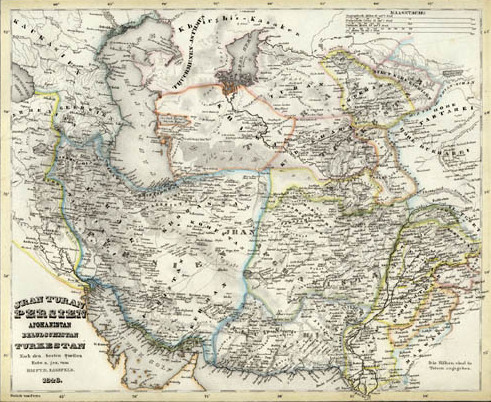
Central Asia, c. 1848

The "Great Game" (Also called the Tournament of Shadows (Russian: Турниры теней, Turniry Teney) in Russia) was the strategic, economic and political rivalry, emanating to conflict between the British Empire and the Russian Empire for supremacy in Central Asia at the expense of Afghanistan, Persia and the Central Asian Khanates/Emirates. The classic Great Game period is generally regarded as running approximately from the Russo-Persian Treaty of 1813 to the Anglo-Russian Convention of 1907, in which nations like Emirate of Bukhara fell. A less intensive phase followed the Bolshevik Revolution of 1917, causing some trouble with Persia and Afghanistan until the mid-1920s.

In the post-Second World War post-colonial period, the term has informally continued in its usage to describe the geopolitical machinations of the great powers and regional powers as they vie for geopolitical power as well as influence in the area, especially in Afghanistan and Iran/Persia.

== Africa ==
=== Prelude ===
Between 1850 and 1914, Britain brought nearly 30% of Africa's population under its control, to 15% for France, 9% for Germany, 7% for Belgium and 1% for Italy: Nigeria alone contributed 15 million subjects to Britain, more than in the whole of French West Africa, or the entire German colonial empire. The only nations that were not under European control by 1914 were Liberia and Ethiopia.

=== British colonies ===
Britain's formal occupation of Egypt in 1882, triggered by concern over the Suez Canal, contributed to a preoccupation over securing control of the Nile River, leading to the conquest of neighboring Sudan in 1896–1898, which in turn led to confrontation with a French military expedition at Fashoda in September 1898. In 1899, Britain set out to complete its takeover of the future South Africa, which it had begun in 1814 with the annexation of the Cape Colony, by invading the gold-rich Afrikaner republics of Transvaal and the neighboring Orange Free State. The chartered British South Africa Company had already seized the land to the north, renamed Rhodesia after its head, the Cape tycoon Cecil Rhodes.

British gains in southern and East Africa prompted Rhodes and Alfred Milner, Britain's High Commissioner in South Africa, to urge a "Cape to Cairo" empire: linked by rail, the strategically important Canal would be firmly connected to the mineral-rich South, though Belgian control of the Congo Free State and German control of German East Africa prevented such an outcome until the end of World War I, when Great Britain acquired the latter territory.

Britain's quest for southern Africa and its diamonds led to social complications and fallouts that lasted for years. To work for their prosperous company, British businessmen hired both white and black South Africans. But when it came to jobs, the white South Africans received the higher paid and less dangerous ones, leaving the black South Africans to risk their lives in the mines for limited pay. This process of separating the two groups of South Africans, whites and blacks, was the beginning of segregation between the two that lasted until 1990.

The United Kingdom emerged in 1913 with not only a large overseas empire, thanks to its long-standing presence in India, but also with gains in the conquest of Africa, reflecting its advantageous position at its inception.

=== Congo Free State ===
Until 1876, Belgium had no colonial presence in Africa. It was then that its king, Leopold II, created the International African Society. Operating under the pretense of an international scientific and philanthropic association, it was actually a private holding company owned by Leopold. Henry Morton Stanley was employed to explore and colonize the Congo River basin area of equatorial Africa in order to capitalize on the plentiful resources such as ivory, rubber, diamonds, and metals. Up until this point, Africa was known as "the Dark Continent" because of the difficulties Europeans had with exploration. Over the next few years, Stanley overpowered and made treaties with over 450 native tribes, acquiring over 2,340,000 square kilometres (905,000 sq mi) of land, nearly 67 times the size of Belgium.

Neither the Belgian government nor the Belgian people had any interest in imperialism at the time, and the land came to be personally owned by King Leopold II. At the Berlin Conference in 1884, he was allowed to have land named the Congo Free State. The other European countries at the conference allowed this to happen on the conditions that he suppress the East African slave trade, promote humanitarian policies, guarantee free trade, and encourage missions to Christianize the people of the Congo. However, Leopold II's primary focus was to make a large profit on the natural resources, particularly ivory and rubber. In order to make this profit, he passed several cruel decrees that can be considered to be genocide. He forced the natives to supply him with rubber and ivory without any sort of payment in return. Their wives and children were held hostage until the workers returned with enough rubber or ivory to fill their quota, and if they could not, their family would be killed. When villages refused, they were burned down; the children of the village were murdered and the men had their hands cut off. These policies led to uprisings, but they were feeble compared to European military and technological might, and were consequently crushed. The forced labor was opposed in other ways: fleeing into the forests to seek refuge or setting the rubber forests on fire, preventing the Europeans from harvesting the rubber.

No population figures exist from before or after the period, but it is estimated that as many as 10 million people died from violence, famine and disease. However, some sources point to a total population of 16 million people.

King Leopold II profited from the enterprise with a 700% profit ratio for the rubber he took from Congo and exported. He used propaganda to keep the other European nations at bay, for he broke almost all of the parts of the agreement he made at the Berlin Conference. For example, he had some Congolese pygmies sing and dance at the 1897 World Fair in Belgium, showing how he was supposedly civilizing and educating the natives of the Congo. Under significant international pressure, the Belgian government annexed the territory in 1908 and renamed it the Belgian Congo, removing it from the personal power of the king. Of all the colonies that were conquered during the wave of New Imperialism, the human rights abuses of the Congo Free State were considered the worst.

== Oceania ==
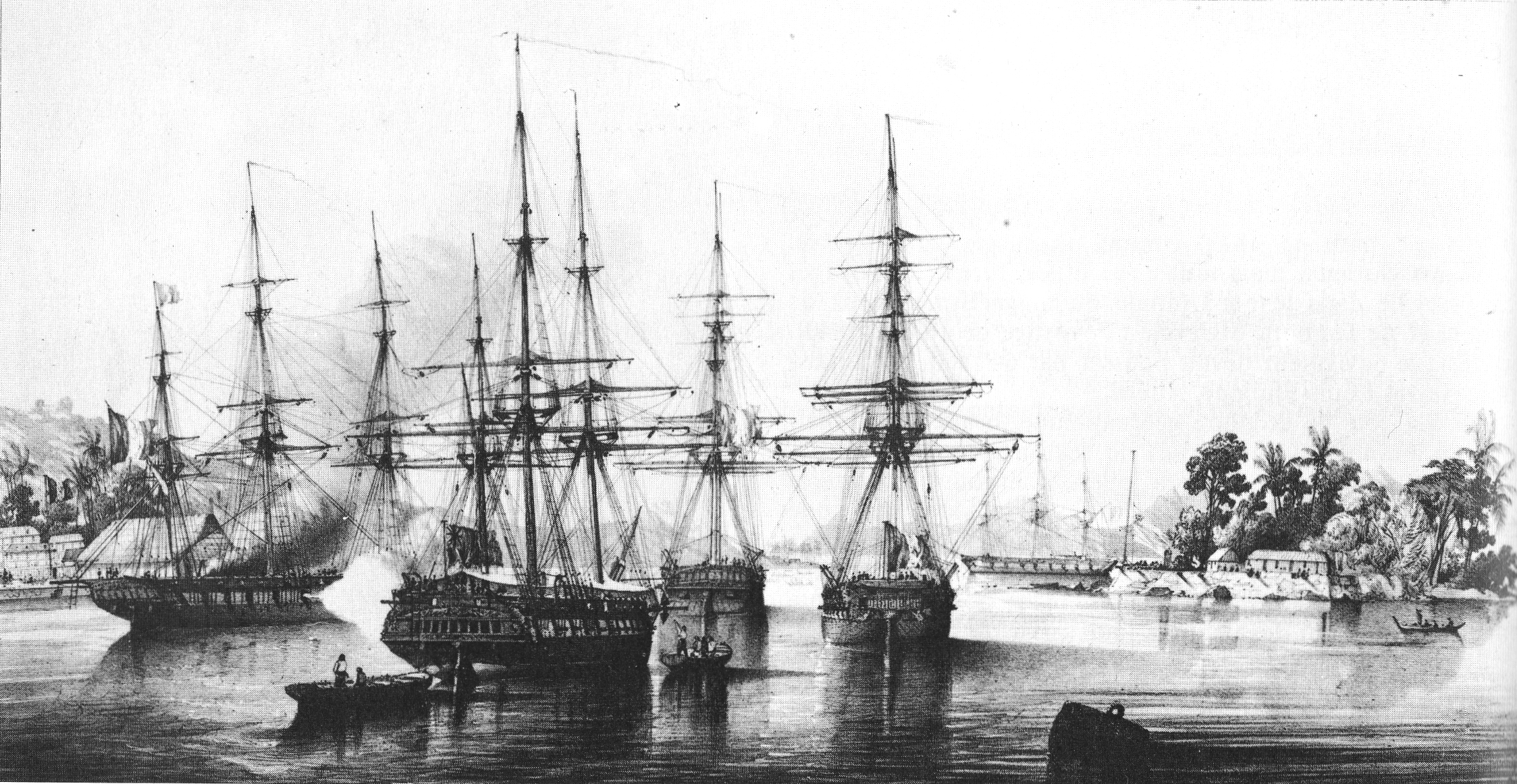
Du Petit-Thouars taking over Tahiti on September 9, 1842

France gained a leading position as an imperial power in the Pacific after making Tahiti and New Caledonia protectorates in 1842 and 1853 respectively. Tahiti was later annexed entirely into the French colonial empire in 1880, along with the rest of the Society Islands.

The United States made several territorial gains during this period, particularly with the overthrow and annexation of the Kingdom of Hawaiʻi and acquisition of most of Spain's colonial outposts following the 1898 Spanish–American War, as well as the partition of the Samoan Islands into American Samoa and German Samoa.

By 1900, nearly all islands in the Pacific Ocean were under the control of Britain, France, the United States, Germany, Japan, Mexico, Ecuador, and Chile.

=== Chilean expansion ===
Chile's interest in expanding into the islands of the Pacific Ocean dates to the presidency of José Joaquín Prieto (1831–1841) and the ideology of Diego Portales, who considered that Chile's expansion into Polynesia was a natural consequence of its maritime destiny. (Note: According to economist Neantro Saavedra-Rivano: "Of all Latin American countries, Chile has been the most explicit and consistent throughout its history in expressing its vocation as a Pacific nation and acting in accordance with this conception.") Nonetheless, the first stage of the country's expansionism into the Pacific began only a decade later, in 1851, when—in response to an American incursion into the Juan Fernández Islands—Chile's government formally organized the islands into a subdelegation of Valparaíso. That same year, Chile's economic interest in the Pacific were renewed after its merchant fleet briefly succeeded in creating an agricultural goods exchange market that connected the Californian port of San Francisco with Australia. By 1861, Chile had established a lucrative enterprise across the Pacific, its national currency abundantly circulating throughout Polynesia and its merchants trading in the markets of Tahiti, New Zealand, Tasmania, and Shanghai; negotiations were also made with the Spanish Philippines, and altercations reportedly occurred between Chilean and American whalers in the Sea of Japan. This period ended as a result of the Chilean merchant fleet's destruction by Spanish forces in 1866, during the Chincha Islands War.

Chile's Polynesian aspirations would again be awakened in the aftermath of the country's decisive victory against Peru in the War of the Pacific, which left the Chilean fleet as the dominant maritime force in the Pacific coast of the Americas. Valparaíso had also become the most important port in the Pacific coast of South America, providing Chilean merchants with the capacity to find markets in the Pacific for its new mineral wealth acquired from the Atacama. During this period, the Chilean intellectual and politician Benjamín Vicuña Mackenna (who served as senator in the National Congress from 1876 to 1885) was an influential voice in favor of Chilean expansionism into the Pacific—he considered that Spain's discoveries in the Pacific had been stolen by the British, and envisioned that Chile's duty was to create an empire in the Pacific that would reach Asia. In the context of this imperialist fervor is that, in 1886, Captain Policarpo Toro of the Chilean Navy proposed to his superiors the annexation of Easter Island; a proposal which was supported by President José Manuel Balmaceda because of the island's apparent strategic location and economic value. After Toro transferred the rights to the island's sheep ranching operations from Tahiti-based businesses to the Chilean-based Williamson-Balfour Company in 1887, Easter Island's annexation process was culminated with the signing of the "Agreement of Wills" between Rapa Nui chieftains and Toro, in name of the Chilean government, in 1888. By occupying Easter Island, Chile joined the imperial nations.

== Imperial rivalries ==
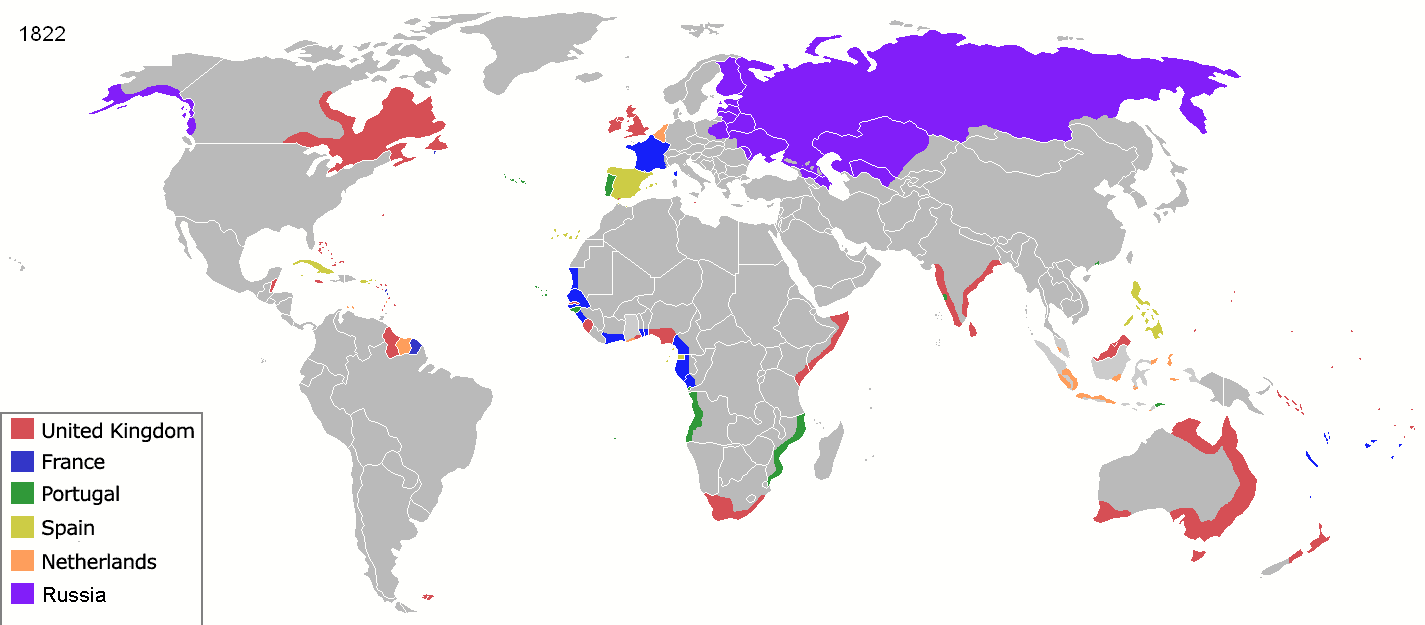
Map of the world in 1822, after the Napoleonic Wars

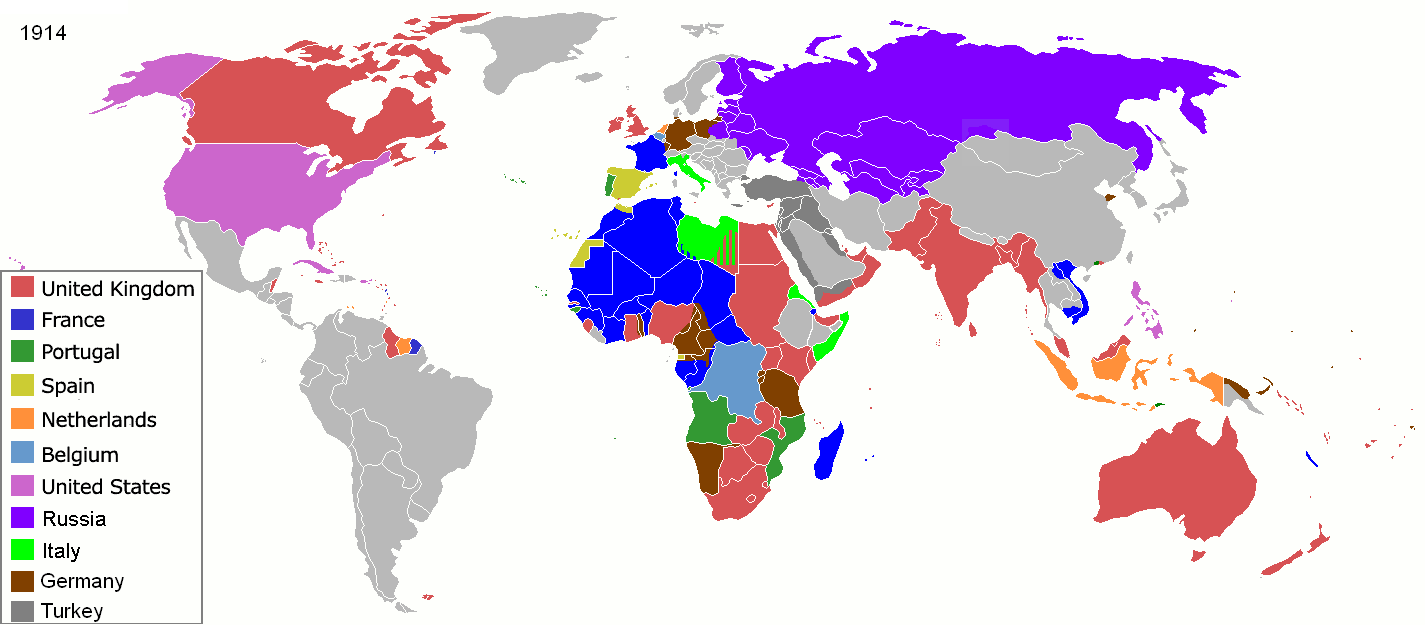
Map of the world in 1914, before the start of World War I

The extension of European control over Africa and Asia added a further dimension to the rivalry and mutual suspicion which characterized international diplomacy in the decades preceding World War I. France's seizure of Tunisia in 1881 initiated fifteen years of tension with Italy, which had hoped to take the country, retaliating by allying with Germany and waging a decade-long tariff war with France. Britain's takeover of Egypt a year later caused a marked cooling of its relations with France.

The most striking conflicts of the era were the Spanish–American War of 1898 and the Russo-Japanese War of 1904–1905, each signaling the advent of a new imperial great power; the United States and Japan, respectively. The Fashoda incident of 1898 represented the worst Anglo-French crisis in decades, but France's buckling in the face of British demands foreshadowed improved relations as the two countries set about resolving their overseas claims.

British policy in South Africa and German actions in the Far East contributed to dramatic policy shifts, which in the 1900s, aligned hitherto isolationist Britain first with Japan as an ally, and then with France and Russia in the looser Triple Entente. German efforts to break the Entente by challenging French hegemony in Morocco resulted in the Tangier Crisis of 1905 and the Agadir Crisis of 1911, adding to tension and anti-German sentiment in the years preceding World War I. In the Pacific, conflicts between Germany, the United States, and the United Kingdom contributed to the First and Second Samoan Civil War.

Another crisis occurred in 1902–1903, when there was a stand-off between Venezuela backed by Argentina, the United States (see Drago Doctrine and Monroe Doctrine) and a coalition of European countries.

== Motivation ==
=== Humanitarianism ===
One of the biggest motivations behind New Imperialism was the idea of humanitarianism and "civilizing" the "lower" class people in Africa and in other undeveloped places. This was a religious motive for many Christian missionaries, in an attempt to save the souls of the "uncivilized" people, and based on the idea that European Christians were morally superior. Most of the missionaries that supported imperialism did so because they felt the only "true" religion was their own. Similarly, French, Spanish and Italian Catholic missionaries opposed the Protestant British, German, and American missionaries. At times, however, imperialism did help the people of the colonies because the missionaries ended up stopping slavery in some areas. Therefore, Europeans claimed that they were only there because they wanted to protect the weaker tribal groups they conquered. The missionaries and other leaders suggested that they should stop such "savage" practices as cannibalism, idolatry and child marriage. This humanitarian ideal was described in poems such as The White Man's Burden and other literature.

In many instances, the humanitarianism was sincere, but often with misguided choices. Although some imperialists were trying to be sincere with the notion of humanitarianism, at times their choices might not have been best for the areas they were conquering and the natives living there. As a result, some modern historical revisionists have suggested that new imperialism was driven more by the idea of racial and cultural supremacism, and that claims of "humanitarianism" were either insincere or used as pretexts for territorial expansion.

=== Dutch Ethical Policy ===
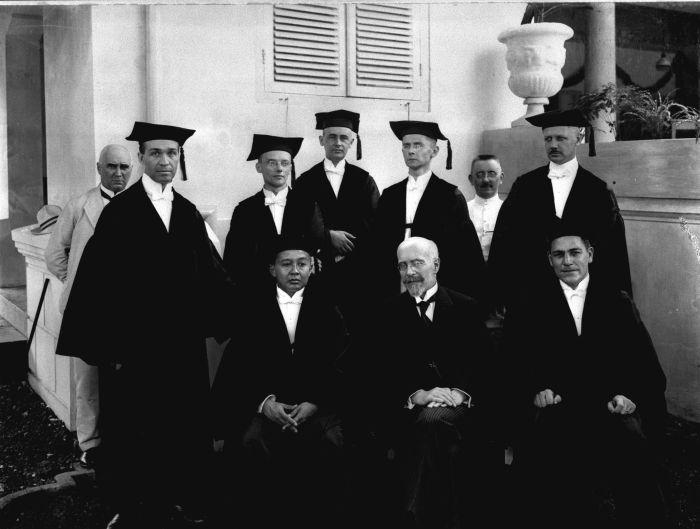
Dutch, Indo-Eurasian and Javanese professors of law at the opening of the Rechts Hogeschool in 1924

The Dutch Ethical Policy was the dominant reformist and liberal political character of colonial policy in the Dutch East Indies during the 20th century. In 1901, the Dutch Queen Wilhelmina announced that the Netherlands accepted an ethical responsibility for the welfare of their colonial subjects despite clearly being discriminatory towards the oppressed colonised peoples. This announcement was a sharp contrast with the former official doctrine that Indonesia was mainly a wingewest (region for making profit). It marked the start of modern development policy, implemented and practised by Alexander Willem Frederik Idenburg, whereas other colonial powers usually talked of a civilizing mission, which mainly involved spreading their culture to colonized peoples and expanding their culture.

The Dutch Ethical Policy (Dutch: Ethische Politiek) emphasised improvement in material living conditions. The policy suffered, however, from serious underfunding, inflated expectations and lack of acceptance in the Dutch colonial establishment, and it had largely ceased to exist by the onset of the Great Depression in 1929. It did, however, create an educated indigenous elite able to articulate the desire for, and eventually establish, independence from the Netherlands.

== Theories ==
The "accumulation theory" adopted by Karl Kautsky, John A. Hobson and popularized by Vladimir Lenin centered on the accumulation of surplus capital during and after the Industrial Revolution: restricted opportunities at home, the argument goes, drove financial interests to seek more profitable investments in less-developed lands with lower labor costs, unexploited raw materials and little competition. Hobson's analysis fails to explain colonial expansion on the part of less industrialized nations with little surplus capital, such as Italy, or the great powers of the next century—the United States and Russia—which were in fact net borrowers of foreign capital. Also, military and bureaucratic costs of occupation frequently exceeded financial returns. In Africa (exclusive of what would become the Union of South Africa in 1909) the amount of capital investment by Europeans was relatively small before and after the 1880s, and the companies involved in tropical African commerce exerted limited political influence.

The "World-Systems theory" approach of Immanuel Wallerstein sees imperialism as part of a general, gradual extension of capital investment from the "core" of the industrial countries to a less developed "periphery." Protectionism and formal empire were the major tools of "semi-peripheral," newly industrialized states, such as Germany, seeking to usurp Britain's position at the "core" of the global capitalist system.

Echoing Wallerstein's global perspective to an extent, imperial historian Bernard Porter views Britain's adoption of formal imperialism as a symptom and an effect of her relative decline in the world, and not of strength: "Stuck with outmoded physical plants and outmoded forms of business organization, [Britain] now felt the less favorable effects of being the first to modernize."

== Timeline ==
- 1832: Britain annexed the Falkland Islands from the United Provinces of the Río de la Plata.
- 1837: Britain annexed the Pitcairn Islands.
- 1839: Britain conquered Aden from the Sultanate of Lahej.
- 1840: Britain established the Colony of New Zealand.
- 1843: Britain received Hong Kong Island from China.
- 1848: Britain annexed the Sikh Empire in Punjab.
- 1852: France annexed New Caledonia.
- 1854: Division of the Kuril Islands and Sakhalin between Russia and Japan.
- 1857: Britain suppressed the Indian Rebellion.
- 1859: Britain annexed the Cocos (Keeling) Islands and Perim. Completion of the French conquest of Algeria.
- 1861: Unification of the Kingdom of Italy
- 1862: Creation of French Cochinchina. British Honduras declared a colony.
- 1864: Russia completed the conquest of the Caucasus.
- 1867: United States purchased Alaska from Russia.
- 1869: Japan annexed Hokkaido.
- 1870: Russia annexed Novaya Zemlya.
- 1871: Unification of the German Empire.
- 1874: Britain established the Colony of Fiji.
- 1875: Japan annexed the Bonin Islands.
- 1879: Japan annexed the Ryukyu Islands.
- 1881: France annexed Tunisia.
- 1882: Britain occupied Egypt.
- 1884: Argentina completed the Conquest of the Desert in Patagonia.
- 1885: Britain completed the conquest of Myanmar. Belgian king established the Congo Free State. German protectorate over Marshall Islands.
- 1887: British protectorate over Maldives. Creation of French Somaliland.
- 1888: Britain annexed Christmas Island. Creation of British Somaliland. Germany annexed Nauru. Chile annexed Easter Island.
- 1889: Creation of French Polynesia.
- 1890: British protectorate over Zanzibar. Creation of Italian Eritrea.
- 1892: Britain annexed Banaba Island and Gilbert Islands.
- 1895: China ceded Taiwan and Penghu to Japan.
- 1897: France annexed Madagascar.
- 1898: United States annexed Hawaii, Puerto Rico, Cuba, Guam, and the Philippines.
- 1898: Division of the Samoan Islands into German Samoa and American Samoa.
- 1900: British protectorate over Tonga.
- 1906: Britain and France established the New Hebrides condominium.
- 1908: France annexed the Comoro Islands.
- 1910: Japan annexed the Korean Empire.
- 1915: Britain annexed Cyprus.
- 1919: Japan annexed Micronesia.
- 1920: France annexed Syria and Lebanon. Britain annexed Iraq, Jordan, and Palestine.

== See also ==
- Afro-Asia
- Dollar diplomacy, US about 1910
- Historiography of the British Empire
- Imperialism
- International relations (1814–1919)
- Russian Empire
- Soviet Empire
- Timeline of European imperialism
- Imperialism in Asia

=== People ===
- Otto von Bismarck, Germany
- Cecil Rhodes, Britain
- Joseph Chamberlain, Britain
- Jules Ferry, France
- Napoléon III, France
- Victor Emmanuel III, Italy
- Tsar Alexander II, Russia
- Theodore Roosevelt, United States
- Emperor Meiji, Japan
- Julio Argentino Roca, Argentina
- Porfirio Díaz, Mexico
