= HAFFA =

The Hong Kong Association of Freight Forwarding & Logistics Ltd (HAFFA) is a non-profit organization which promotes, protects and develops the carriage of goods (whether by air, sea or land) generally, and the businesses of cargo forwarding agents and logistics service providers in particular.

== History ==
Founded in 1966 as the Association of Hong Kong Air Freight Forwarding Agents (AHAFA), in 1986, AHAFA became Hong Kong's sole ordinary member of the International Federation of Freight Forwarders Associations (FIATA).

Since then, the Association's responsibilities have increasingly included all modes of transport: air, sea and land. To reflect this fact, and with an increasing number of seafreight forwarders among its members, the Association changed its name to the Hong Kong Association of Freight Forwarding Agents (HAFFA) in May, 1989.

Cargo volume into China has increased in the wake of China's entry to the WTO. Transport logistics is one of the sectors for long term growth identified by the Hong Kong Government. In recognition of the growing importance of both virtual and physical logistics in Hong Kong, HAFFA is moving with the times by reflecting the ever-increasing sophistication of the industry and changing its name to the Hong Kong Association of Freight Forwarding And Logistics Limited in April, 2002, although the existing logo and short form, HAFFA, remain unchanged.

The Association, now with several hundred members, acts as an authoritative voice for the industry at official and government levels. HAFFA is responsible for setting industry standards and providing educational courses and business development programs which enhance the professional levels of freight forwarders and logistics service providers (LSPs) in Hong Kong.
