= Oceanbulk Shipping & Trading SA v TMT Asia Ltd =

- Court: Supreme Court
- Citation: [2010] UKSC 44

Court membership
- Judges sitting: Lord Phillips, Lord Rodger, Lord Walker, Lord Brown, Lord Mance, Lord Clarke, Sir John Dyson

Keywords
- Without prejudice, construction

Oceanbulk Shipping & Trading SA v TMT Asia Ltd [2010] UKSC 44 is an English contract law case concerning the interpretation of contracts, raised on appeal from a Commercial Court hearing in 2009.

== Facts ==
TMT and Oceanbulk entered into a series of freight forward contracts whose value depended on the movement of the freight market. At a point when TMT owed Oceanbulk a significant amount of money, they negotiated a written settlement agreement, but in September 2008 a dispute arose over the construction of the settlement agreement. To resolve their dispute they engaged in "without prejudice" negotiations. TMT argued that, as an exception to the rule excluding "without prejudice" negotiations from consideration, exchanges could be taken into account if they would ordinarily be admissible as part of the factual matrix or circumstances in construction of an agreement.

== Judgment ==
The Court of Appeal held by a majority ruling in February 2010 that it was more important for justice to preserve the "without prejudice" rule than to allow the court to use without-prejudice "background facts" in interpreting an agreement.

However, on appeal to the Supreme Court, the latter court held in November 2010 that there should be an exception to the "without prejudice" rule for facts communicated between the parties in the course of "without prejudice" negotiations, where such facts would assist the court to construe an agreement that resulted from the negotiations. The Court referred to this exception as the "interpretation exception":

Should the interpretation exception be recognised as an exception to the without prejudice rule?
I have reached the conclusion that this question should be answered in the affirmative.

The Court of Appeal explored the impact of the "interpretation exception" and the duty of the court to protect "without-prejudice" statements where it can, in its ruling in the case of Berkeley Square Holdings Ltd and others v Lancer Property Asset Management Ltd and others in 2021.

== See also ==
- English contract law
