= Santiago (1856 ship) =

Barque wrecked in 1945 in the Port River

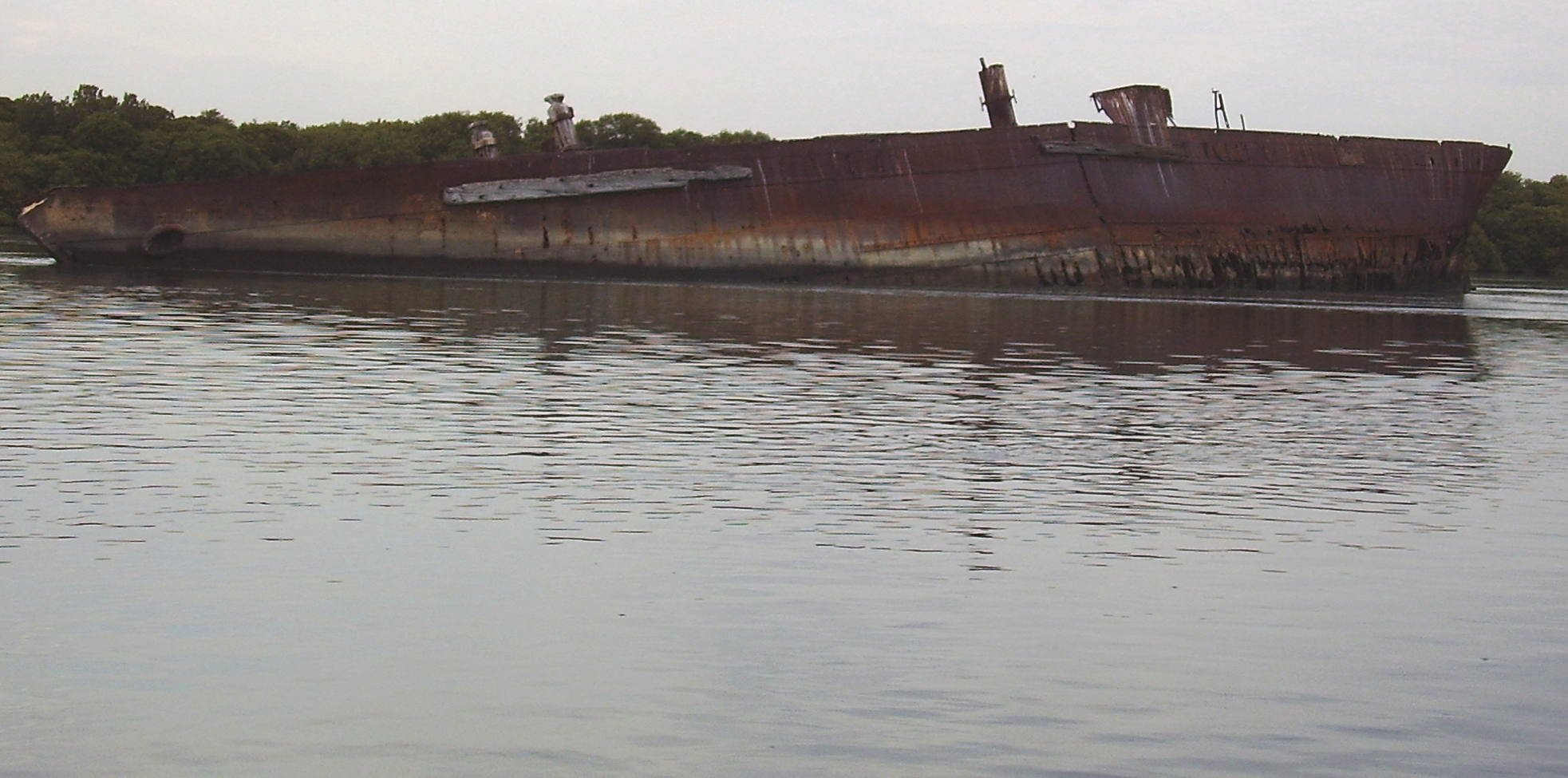
- Wreck of the Santiago

History

United Kingdom
- Name: Santiago
- Builder: Henry Balfour, Methil, Fife, Scotland
- Launched: 1856

History

Germany
- Acquired: 1888

History

Norway
- Acquired: 1890

History

Australia
- Port of registry: Adelaide
- Acquired: Appx. 1900
- Out of service: 1945
- Fate: Abandoned 1945
- Notes: Now in Garden Island Ships' Graveyard, near Port Adelaide, Australiahistoric shipwreck

General characteristics
- Tons burthen: 455 tons
- Length: 160 ft 7 in (48.95 m)
- Beam: 25 ft 10 in (7.87 m)
- Depth of hold: 17 ft 4 in (5.28 m)
- Propulsion: sail
- Sail plan: Barque

The Santiago was a 455-ton barque launched in 1856. It was built by Henry Balfour of Methil, Fife for the Liverpool shipping company Balfour Williamson. It sailed mainly between Liverpool and Chile, but also to Australia. Its remnant hull, which lies in a ships' graveyard in South Australia, was considered 'the oldest intact iron hull sailing vessel in the world', until part of the central section collapsed in January 2023.

== Career ==
After service with Balfour Williamson, she was sold in 1888 to a German company, and in 1890 to Norwegians. In 1901, the Adelaide Steamtug Company purchased the ship and sailed it from Newcastle, New South Wales to Port Adelaide with a cargo of coal. She was subsequently dismasted and used as a lighter. On 21 December 1907, she was used by Adelaide Steamtug Company in association with other vessels to recover the steamer Jessie Darling, which had collided with and sunk on top of the unmarked wreck of the barque Norma on 21 April 1907. Norma had been sunk after a collision with the ship Ardencraig, several hours earlier at the Semaphore Anchorage. In 1918 she was sold to the Adelaide Steam Co. and was used for occasional salvage work and lightering until 1945, when she was abandoned.

== Fate ==
On 19 August 1945, she was towed to the eastern extent of the Port River's North Arm, and became the last vessel to be abandoned in what is now known as the Garden Island Ships' Graveyard. In 1982, the Santiago was declared as an historic shipwreck under the South Australian Historic Shipwrecks Act 1981. The wreck is officially located at 34°48′36″S 138°32′24″E. She has been the subject of study by various parties including the Society for Underwater Historical Research in 1978 and by the Department of Environment and Heritage on an ongoing basis since 1981, and more recently by Flinders University in conjunction with the South Australian Maritime Museum. In 1991, she was listed on the now-defunct Register of the National Estate.

== See also ==
- List of shipwrecks of Australia

== Further Information ==
- Mary A. Reilly, Methil Heritage - Santiago retrieved 08/07/2012.
- 'Ships' Graveyards of SA – Santiago – Garden Island' brochure, retrieved 08/07/2012.
- Hartell, Robyn; Richards, Nathan (2001), Garden Island : ships' graveyard, Heritage South Australia, ISBN 978-0-7308-5894-2
