= Alexander Balfour =

British businessman (1824–1886)

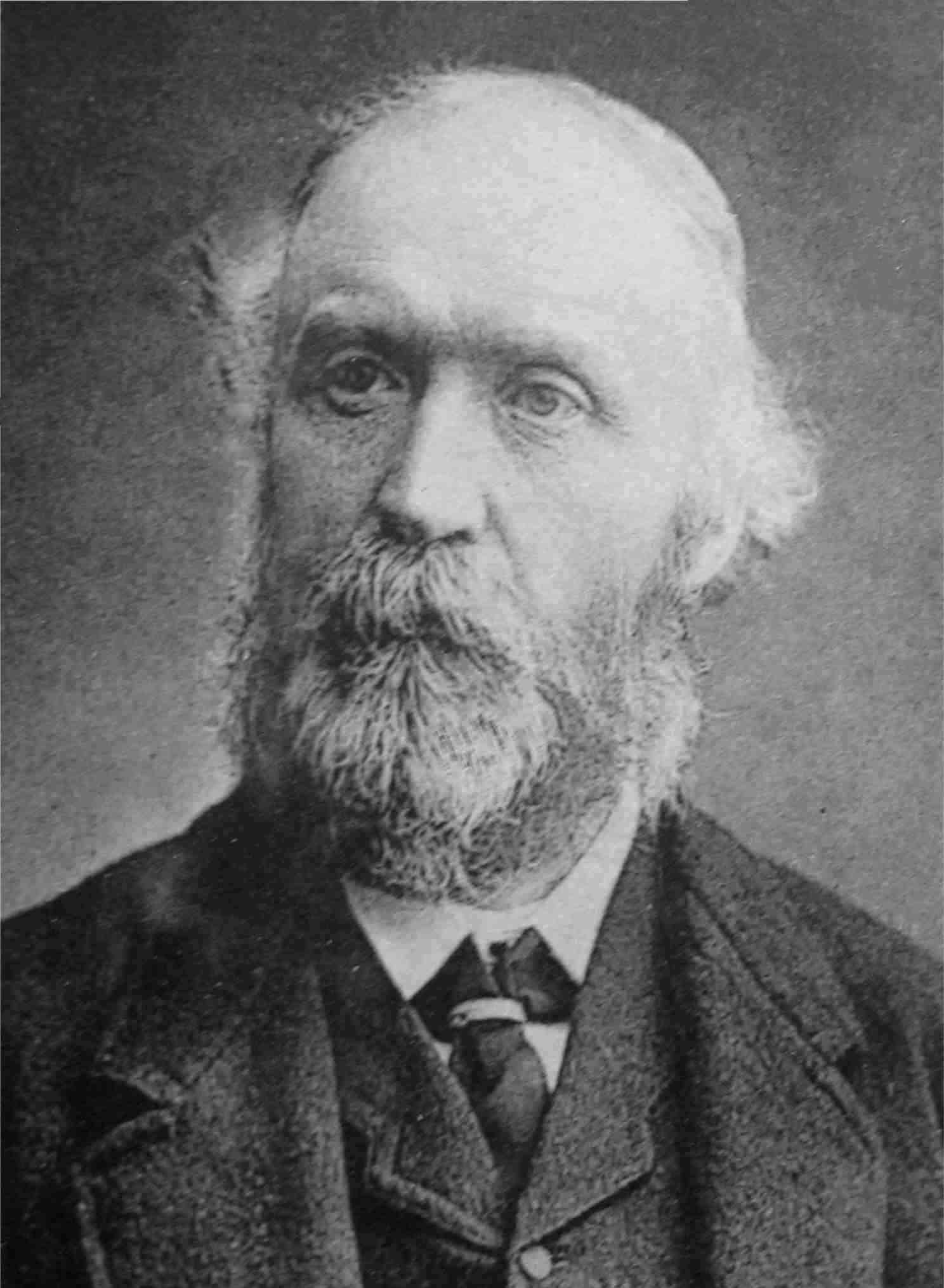
- Born: September 1824
- Died: April 1886 (aged 61)
- Occupation: Merchant

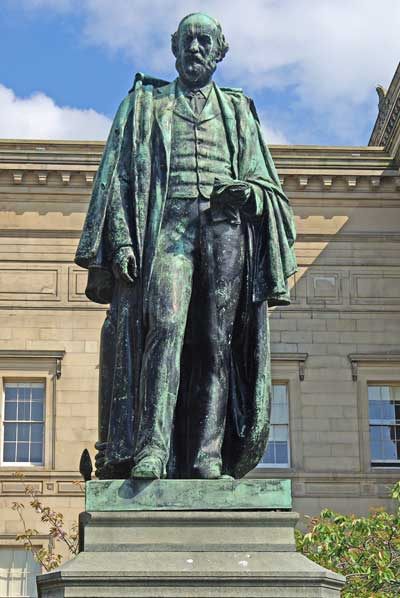
Statue of Alexander Balfour in St John's Gardens Liverpool

Alexander Balfour (2 September 1824 – 16 April 1886) was a Scottish merchant and founder of the Liverpool shipping company Balfour Williamson.

== Early life ==
Balfour was born in Leven, Fife, as the eldest of three sons of Henry Balfour of Dawyck (1796–1854), member of the Scottish landed gentry and a foundry owner, by his wife, Agnes Bisset (1804–1881).

== Biography ==
He was educated at the High School of Dundee and St Andrews University, and in 1844 moved to Liverpool, where in 1851 he founded Balfour Williamson with Stephen Williamson and David Duncan.

He was a committed philanthropist, and founded the Duke Street Home, to provide better conditions for sailors, and orphanages for seamen's children.

He co-founded Edge Hill University (then Edge Hill College) in 1885, the first non-denominational teacher training college for women in England. There is a Halls of Residence called Balfour in his honour.

He bought a country estate at Mount Alyn, at Rossett, south of Chester. He died there in 1886. Alexander is buried at Christchurch Cemetery, Rossett, Wrexham which is near to his former home.

There is a statue of him by Albert Bruce-Joy in St John's Gardens, Liverpool.

== Personal life ==
He was married to Janet Roxburgh (1844–1923), daughter of John Roxburgh, minister of the Free Church of Scotland. Their offspring were:

- Katherine Gray Balfour (18 January 1865 - 8 August 1865)
- Agatha Agate Henrietta Balfour (1866-1958); married Diarmid Noel Paton, son of Sir Joseph Noel Paton; had issue
- Alexander Balfour (1870–1876), died in infancy
- Frederick Robert Stephen Balfour (1873–1945); married Gertrude Collet Norman (1878–1970) and had issue
- Ernest Roxburgh Balfour (1874–1897)
- Vera Balfour (1878–1965); married Major Angus Mathieson Stewart, M.B.E.; had issue
- Margaret Balfour (1881–1967); married firstly Thomas Arthur Nelson. After his death in 1917, she married Paul Lucien Maze (1887–1979), an artist.
- Archibald Balfour (1883–1958); married firstly to Pearl Isabel Alice Price (1882–1952). He married secondly to Lilian Helen Cooper (d. 1989). He had issue from both marriages. Among them is Neil Roxburgh Balfour, former husband of Princess Elizabeth of Yugoslavia and husband of Serena Mary Spencer-Churchill Russell (b. 1944), daughter of Edwin F. Russell, granddaughter of John Spencer-Churchill, 10th Duke of Marlborough and a relative of Winston Churchill.
