= British International Freight Association =

National trade association

- Abbreviation: BIFA
- Founded: 1944; 82 years ago
- Type: Trade association
- Legal status: Non-profit organisation
- Headquarters: Feltham, Greater London
- Location: Feltham, Greater London
- Region served: United Kingdom
- Members: over 1700
- President: Sir Peter Bottomley
- Website: www.bifa.org

The British International Freight Association, also known as BIFA, is the prime United Kingdom trade association representing UK freight forwarders. These are companies that forward goods internationally on behalf of importers and exporters. It is a not-for-profit organisation owned by its members and managed by a small Secretariat. The board has seven non-executive directors and five executive directors.

The Association acts as an authoritative voice for the industry at official and government levels. The Association is responsible for setting industry standards and providing both educational courses and required mandatory training programs which enhance the professional levels of freight forwarders and logistics service providers in the United Kingdom.

BIFA is the UK National Association member of the International Federation of Freight Forwarders Associations FIATA. It is one of a number of freight trade associations and is listed by the UK government on their Business Link website. It is also consulted by H.M. Revenue and Customs as a member of the Joint Customs Consultative Committee.

The role of BIFA is to represent freight forwarders in discussions with the UK government and various international NGOs, and to provide advice and information on legislative issues that affect the industry sector. It is consulted by UK media organisations concerning air cargo security.

== BIFA’s Freight Service Awards ==
Every year BIFA awards "best in industry" awards in a number of categories, including Air Cargo Services Award and Young Freight Forwarder Award.

=== 2022 award winners ===
Air Cargo Services category - Noatum Logistics

European Logistics award - Westbound Logistics

Ocean Services - Uniserve Group

Cool & Special Cargoes - JCS Livestock

Extra Mile Award - Anchor Freight

Project Forwarding - Deugro (UK)

Specialist Services - Seafast Logistics

Staff Development - GEODIS Freight Forwarding UK

Supply Chain Management - Killick Martin & Co

Apprentice of the Year - Thomas Low (OIA Global)

Young Freight Forwarder of the Year - Thomas Frost (GEODIS Freight Forwarding UK)

== Standard trading conditions ==
The BIFA Conditions, often used in UK forwarding contracts, have been supported by the courts in England and Wales based on the consultation and review process which was undertaken before they were adopted and a finding that "They seek to balance the interests of all parties, and in my view, have long been accepted as reasonable and fair."

BIFA's standard trading conditions do not permit set-off of mutual debts. The UK Court of Appeal case of Röhlig (UK) Ltd v Rock Unique Ltd. (2011) upheld the validity of Clause 21(A), Lord Justice Martin Moore-Bick stating that this clause:

Contains a prohibition against set-off of a kind commonly found in commercial contracts. Its purpose is to ensure that amounts falling due in respect of goods or services are paid promptly, thereby ensuring that cash-flow, which has been described as "the life-blood of business", is not interrupted.
