= Williamson-Balfour Company =

Scottish owned Chilean company

- Founded: 1863; 163 years ago in Valparaíso, Chile
- Defunct: 2000
- Fate: Non-motor business sold off by parent Inchcape, company continued as Williamson Balfour Motors
- Successor: Williamson Balfour Motors S.A.
- Parent: Balfour Williamson (1863-1965); Bank of London and South America (1965-1972); Lloyds Bank (1972-1981); Inchcape plc (1981-2000)
- Subsidiaries: Compañía Explotadora de la Isla de Pascua

The Williamson-Balfour Company (or Williamson, Balfour and Company) was a Scottish owned Chilean company. Its successor company, Williamson Balfour Motors S.A., is a subsidiary of the British company Inchcape plc.

The company was founded in Valparaíso in 1863 as a subsidiary of the Liverpool shipping company Balfour Williamson (founded by the Scots Alexander Balfour and Stephen Williamson). The company was involved in the export of nitrates and wool to England, and later the west coast of the United States. The company diversified into railways, oil, minerals and other activities.

When the Chilean government annexed Easter Island in 1888, it was leased to Enrique Merlet, who sold his control to the Williamson-Balfour Company; they in turn created a subsidiary called Compañía Explotadora de la Isla de Pascua (CEDIP), which ran Easter Island as a sheep farm. The company constructed a boundary wall around Hanga Roa and sheep rearing structures. During the company's rule and for several years after, the Rapa Nui people were confined to Hanga Roa, which they were not allowed to leave without permission.

In 1953, the Chilean government refused to renew their lease and transferred the island to the Chilean Navy and the sheep farming operations ceased. In 1966, the Rapa Nui of Easter Island gained full Chilean citizenship.

On the Chilean mainland the company operated a number of flour mills, and was involved in the import of machinery and other activities. In 1965, the company sold its milling operations, and was itself acquired by the Bank of London and South America (BOLSA). In 1972, BOLSA was acquired by Lloyds Bank, which in 1981 sold the Williamson-Balfour companies to Inchcape plc. In the late 1990s Inchcape decided to concentrate on the distribution of motors, and the non-motor businesses, including Williamson Balfour Agrocomercial Ltda, were sold to Sigdo Koppers in 2000. Williamson Balfour Motors S.A. is still owned by Inchcape, and is now the importer and distributor of BMW and Rolls-Royce Motor Cars in Chile.

== Bibliography ==
- Diamond, Jared (2005) Collapse: How Societies Choose to Fail or Survive New York
- Fischer, S.R. (2007) Island at the End of the World ISBN 1-86189-282-9
