= Automated Export System =

The Automated Export System (AES) is the system used by U.S. exporters to electronically declare their international exports, known as Electronic Export Information (EEI), to the Census Bureau to help compile U.S. export and trade statistics. This information is also shared with the Bureau of Industry and Security, the Directorate of Defense Trade Controls, and other federal agencies involved in monitoring and validating U.S. exports. Formerly, this declaration was only made on paper on the Shipper's Export Declaration form.

Up until November 30, 2015, an exporter could file the EEI electronically to the AES using the AESDirect website, the AESPCLink software, or other AES-compatible applications. However, after the 2015 launch of the Automated Commercial Environment (ACE), all legacy AESDirect and other users must register and submit the EEI to ACE. After an EEI/SED is successfully filed and processed, the shipper receives an Internal Transaction Number (ITN) to put on the shipping documents, as a confirmation to any government agent inspecting the cargo prior to departure.

In most cases it can also authorize its freight forwarder, courier company, or other third-party logistics agent to file the EEI on its behalf.

== Requirements ==
An EEI is generally required when any one commodity on a given shipment exceeds in value. There are four conditions that necessitate filing an EEI regardless of value: a) if the export destination is Cuba, Iran, North Korea, Sudan, or Syria; b) if the shipment requires an export license or permit; c) if it is subject to the International Traffic in Arms Regulations; or d) if it contains rough diamonds. Incidentally, a shipment from the United States to Canada that exceeds in value does not require an EEI unless it falls under conditions b) through d) above.

Shipments to and from Puerto Rico must be treated like any other "international export" under the EEI requirements. On the other hand, cargo headed to American Samoa, Guam, Northern Mariana Islands, and most of the other U.S. territories are treated as domestic shipments and do not need an EEI. The U.S. Virgin Islands is a special case: shipments from that territory to either the U.S. mainland or Puerto Rico are treated as "domestic", but cargo headed in the other direction is treated as "international".

== Information collected ==
Among the data that is required to file an EEI includes the following:

- The U.S. Principal Party in Interest (USPPI): the name and address of the principal seller or party based in the U.S. that is receiving the benefits from the shipment.
- The Employer Identification Number (EIN) of the USPPI - same as company IRS Taxpayer ID #.
- The ultimate consignee: the name and address of the party that is ultimately receiving the shipment.
- Whether the USPPI and the ultimate consignee are "related" companies: if one party owns directly or indirectly at least 10 percent of the other.
- The country of destination
- The departure date: the date of the export out of the country
- The origin state: the primary U.S. state from which the shipment is originates. If commodities originating from different warehouses are being consolidated into one shipment, then it is either the state whose warehouse has the commodity of greatest value, or the state where all the consolidation is being performed.
- The mode of transportation: whether by air, vessel, rail, or by truck.
- The port of export: the airport, seaport, or port of entry where the shipment will actually be taken out of the United States. This is represented by a 4-digit "Port Code". This does not mean the closet port from the originating warehouse. For example, if cargo from Denver would have to be put on a direct international flight from San Francisco to Tokyo, the port of export would then be the San Francisco Airport instead of the Denver Airport.
- Whether it is a "Routed Transaction": A Routed Export Transaction is an export transaction where the foreign principal party in interest (Consignee) authorizes a U.S. forwarding or other agent to facilitate export of items from the United States. In a routed export transaction, the U.S. Principal Party in Interest (USPPI) remains the entity in the United States that receives the primary benefit monetary or otherwise of the export transaction.
- Whether the shipment contains hazardous materials.
- A description of each of the commodities being shipped, including their Harmonized Tariff Schedule code, weight, customs value, quantity, and if any require an export license or permit.

== See also ==
- United States embargoes
- Export Administration Regulations
