= Confirming house =

A confirming house is a specialised agency that purchases and arranges the export of goods on the behalf of overseas buyers. They finance the movement of goods into the country by offering short-term credit to importers and guaranteeing, or confirming, payment to the suppliers in the suppliers own domestic currency. The confirming house usually negotiates the price with the suppliers, ships, insures and provides information on the goods on the overseas buyers' behalf.

If the overseas buyer is unable to pay for the goods the suppliers are liable to refund the confirming house. Most confirming houses have overseas offices that assist the supplier in assessing the creditworthiness of the buyer ex-ante.
