= Oti, Jõgeva County =

Village in Estonia

Oti
- Village
- Location within Estonia
- Coordinates: 58°54′44″N 26°42′04″E
- Country: Estonia
- County: Jõgeva County
- Parish: Jõgeva Parish

Population (2011)
  - Total: 14
- Time zone: UTC+2 (EET)
  - Summer (DST): UTC+3 (EEST)

Oti is a village in Jõgeva Parish, Jõgeva County in eastern Estonia.

As of the 2011 Census, the settlement's population was 14.
