= John Roxburgh (minister) =

Scottish minister

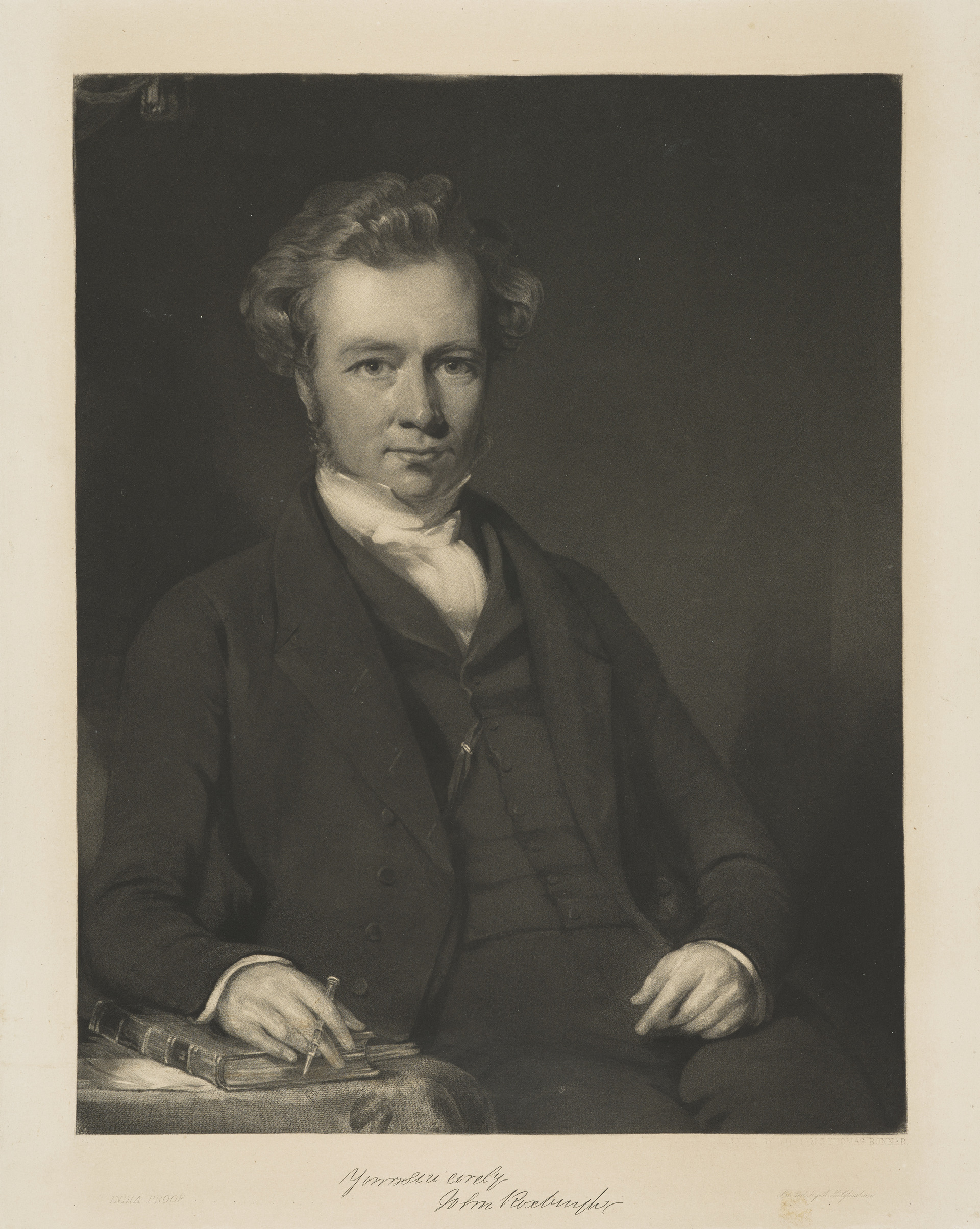
- by William Bonnar and Thomas Bonnar

Personal details
- Born: 8 March 1806
- Died: 2 November 1880 (aged 74)

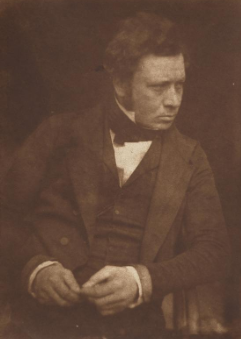
John Roxburgh in 1844 by Adamson & Hill

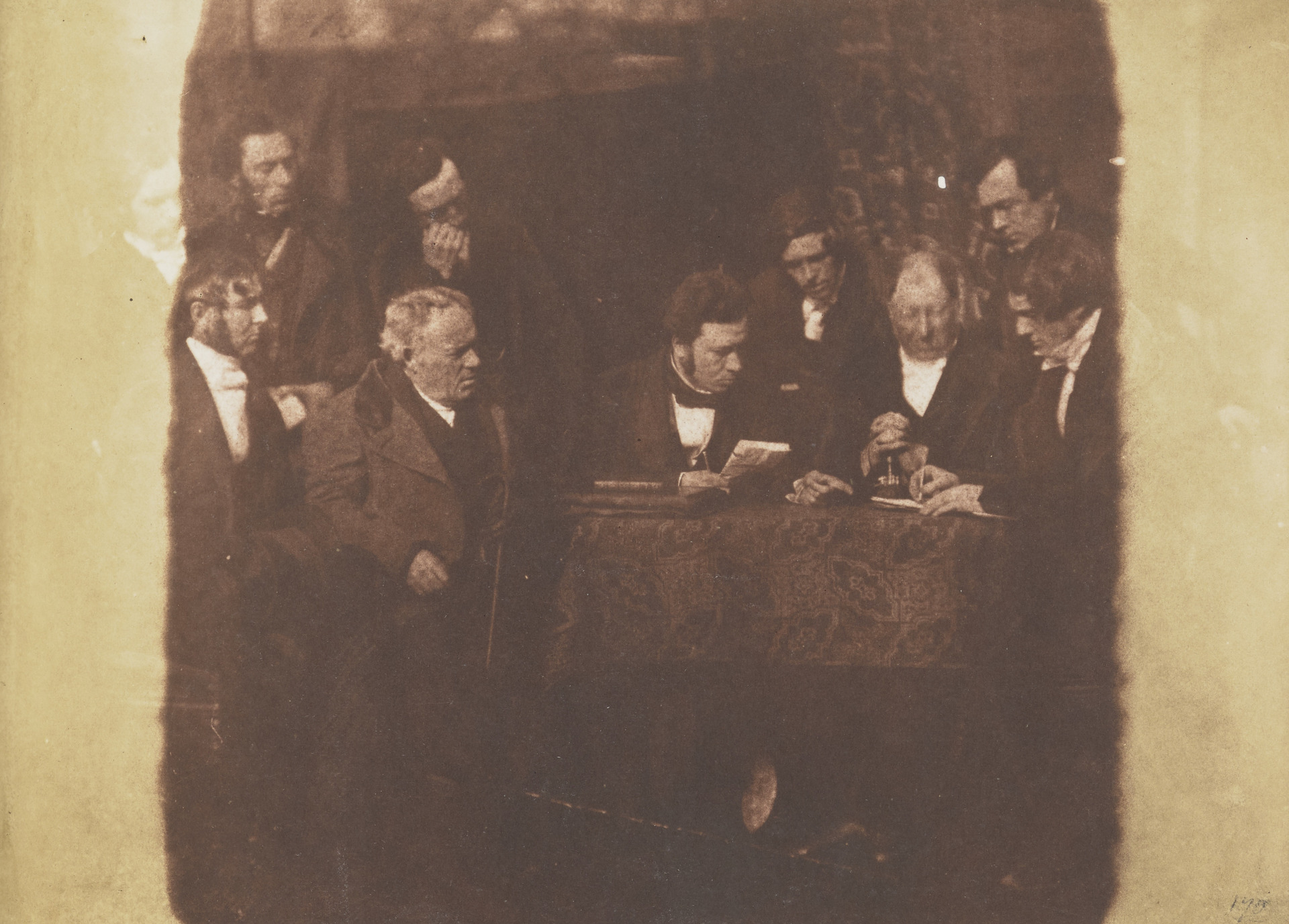
Dundee Presbytery by Adamson & Hill

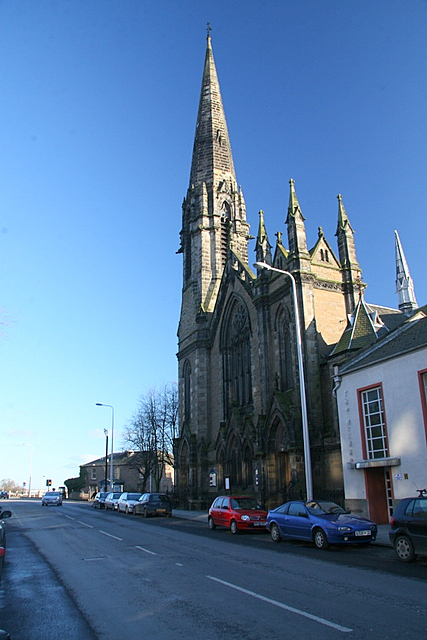
St. John's Church, Dundee

John Roxburgh (1806–1880) was a Scottish minister of the Church of Scotland and later of the Free Church of Scotland. He served as the latter denomination's Moderator of the General Assembly in 1866 or 1867.

== Life ==
He was born on 8 March 1806 the son of Archibald Roxburgh (1773–1823), a Glasgow shipping merchant, and his wife, Elizabeth Clark (1777–1813). In 1820 he was living with his father at 21 Charlotte Street in Glasgow, his mother having died.

He studied Divinity at Glasgow University, graduating with an M.A. in 1828 and was licensed to preach by the Glasgow Presbytery of the Church of Scotland in 1831. He then did mission work in Manchester before returning to do mission work in St David's Parish in Glasgow then in Barony parish.

He was ordained at St John's Church in Dundee in 1834. In 1836, due to great expansion, his parish was split to create a new quoad sacra church called St Peters.

He left the established church in the Disruption of 1843 and joined the Free Church of Scotland, as minister of Free St John's, Dundee, 1843-1847. In 1847 he moved to the newly completed St John's Free Church near George Square, Glasgow, designed by John Thomas Rochead. He was admitted to Free St John's, Glasgow, 18 May 1847.

In 1849 he received an honorary doctorate (DD) on 1 May 1849 from Glasgow University. In 1850 he was living at 6 Provanside in central Glasgow.

From 1857 to 1863 he was Convenor of the Home Missions Committee for the Free Church. From 1866 he was assisted at St John's Free by Rev Alexander Whyte. In 1866 he was elected Moderator of the General Assembly (Scott says 23 May 1867).

He lived his final years at 122 Hill Street, a fine Georgian villa in the Garnethill district of Glasgow. He died at his son's house in Weston-super-Mare on 2 November 1880.

St John's Free Church was demolished in 1971.

== Bibliography ==
- Cruelty to Animals, a sermon
- The Nature and Design of God's Judgments, a discourse (Glasgow, 1832)
- The Glory of the Latter House, a discourse (Dundee, 1843)
- Sermon III. (Free Church Pulpit, i.).
- Alexander Balfour, a Liverpool Philanthropist
- Ernest Roxburgh Balfour (Edinburgh, n.d.)
- Memorials of John Roxburgh, D.D. [by George G. Cameron] (Glasgow, 1881)
- Memorial Addresses at Dawyck and Drumelzier (1923).

== Family ==
On 7 June 1836 he married his cousin, Catherine Grey (1811-1899), daughter of George Gray of Yeaman Shore, Dundee, Esq. (1750-1835) and his wife, Catherine Balfour of Kilmany (1773-1833).

They had at least ten children but only six lived to adulthood:

- Catherine Balfour, born 6 March 1837 (married Francis Sharman, wine merchant), died 25 March 1908
- Elizabeth, born 28 January 1839, died 29 July 1896
- Archibald, merchant, Liverpool, born 6 August 1841, died February 1906
- George Gray, born 5 May 1842, died in infancy
- Janet of Dawyck, born 24 February 1844 (married 23 March 1864, Alexander Balfour, merchant, Liverpool), died 22 February 1923
- Jane Anne, born 7 January 1846 (married 1872, James Mellis, minister of Presbyterian Church of England), Southport
- John, engineer, born 14 October 1847, died December 1871
- Margaret Campbell, born 23 May 1849, died 1857
- Helen Jobson, born 5 January 1851 (married Frederick Gourlay, M.D.), died 1879
- Robert, M.D., born 25 April 1853, died 16th Feb. 1917.

Roxburgh was also the great-uncle of writer, Catherine Carswell (nee Catherine Roxburgh Macfarlane, born 27 March 1879), whom he christened.

== Artistic recognition ==
He was photographed by Hill & Adamson in 1844.

== Sources ==
- Roxburgh, John (1881). Cameron, George G (ed.). Memorials of John Roxburgh D.D., minister of St. John's Free Church, Glasgow. Glasgow: David Bryce & Son.
- Scott, Hew (1925). Fasti ecclesiae scoticanae; the succession of ministers in the Church of Scotland from the reformation. Vol. 5. Edinburgh: Oliver and Boyd. p. 329.
- Smith, John (1853). Our Scottish clergy : fifty-two sketches, biographical, theological, & critical, including clergymen of all denominations. Edinburgh : Oliver & Boyd; London : Simpkin, Marshall; Glasgow : A. Smith. pp. 245-258.
