= Oti Fossae =

Martian geographical feature

- Oti Fossae based on THEMIS day-time image
- Coordinates: 9.3°S 116.8°W

Oti Fossae is a group of fossae (troughs) in the Phoenicis Lacus quadrangle on Mars, located at 9.3° S and 116.8° W. It is 370 km long and was named after a classical albedo feature.

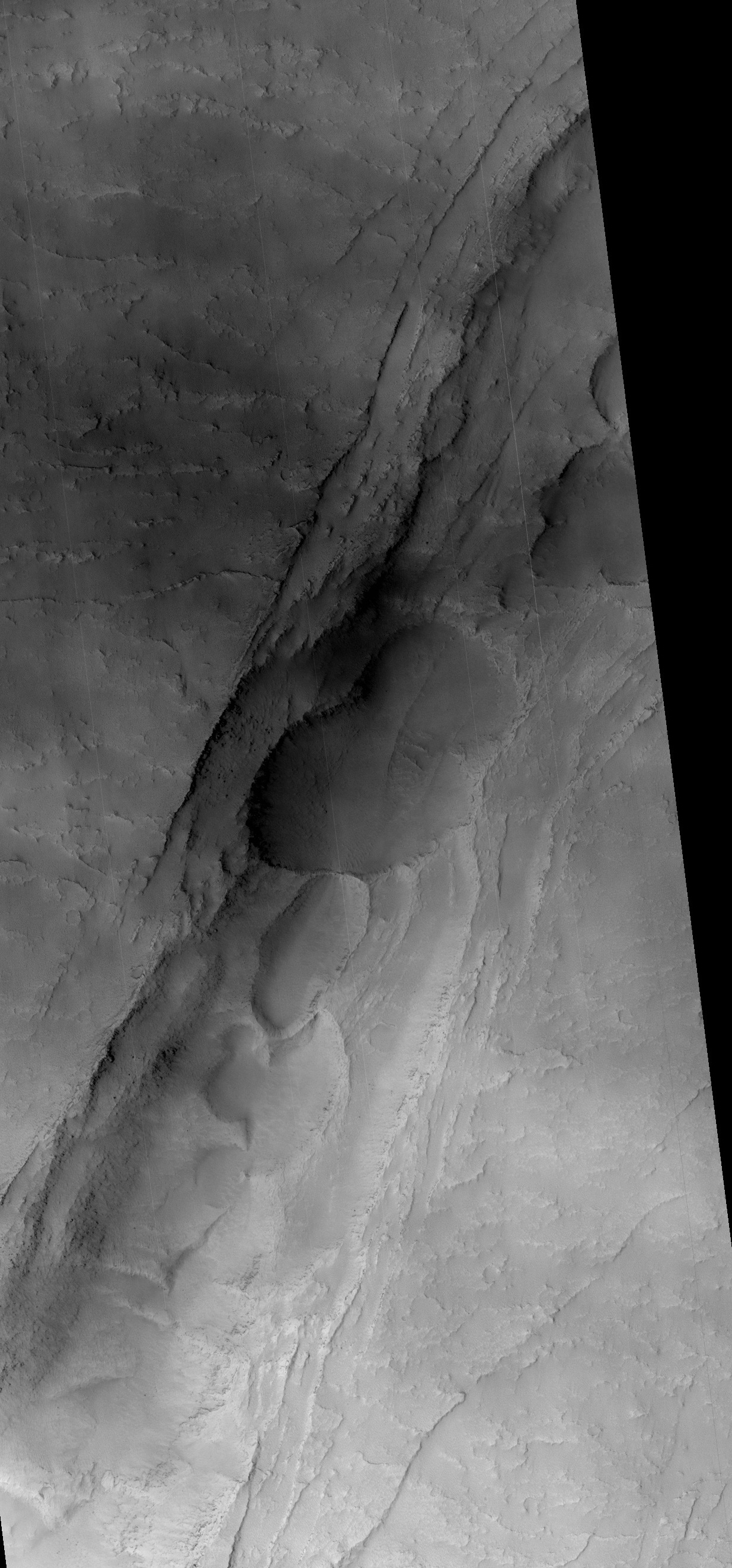
Oti Fossae, as seen by HiRISE. Go to Fossa (geology) for more information.

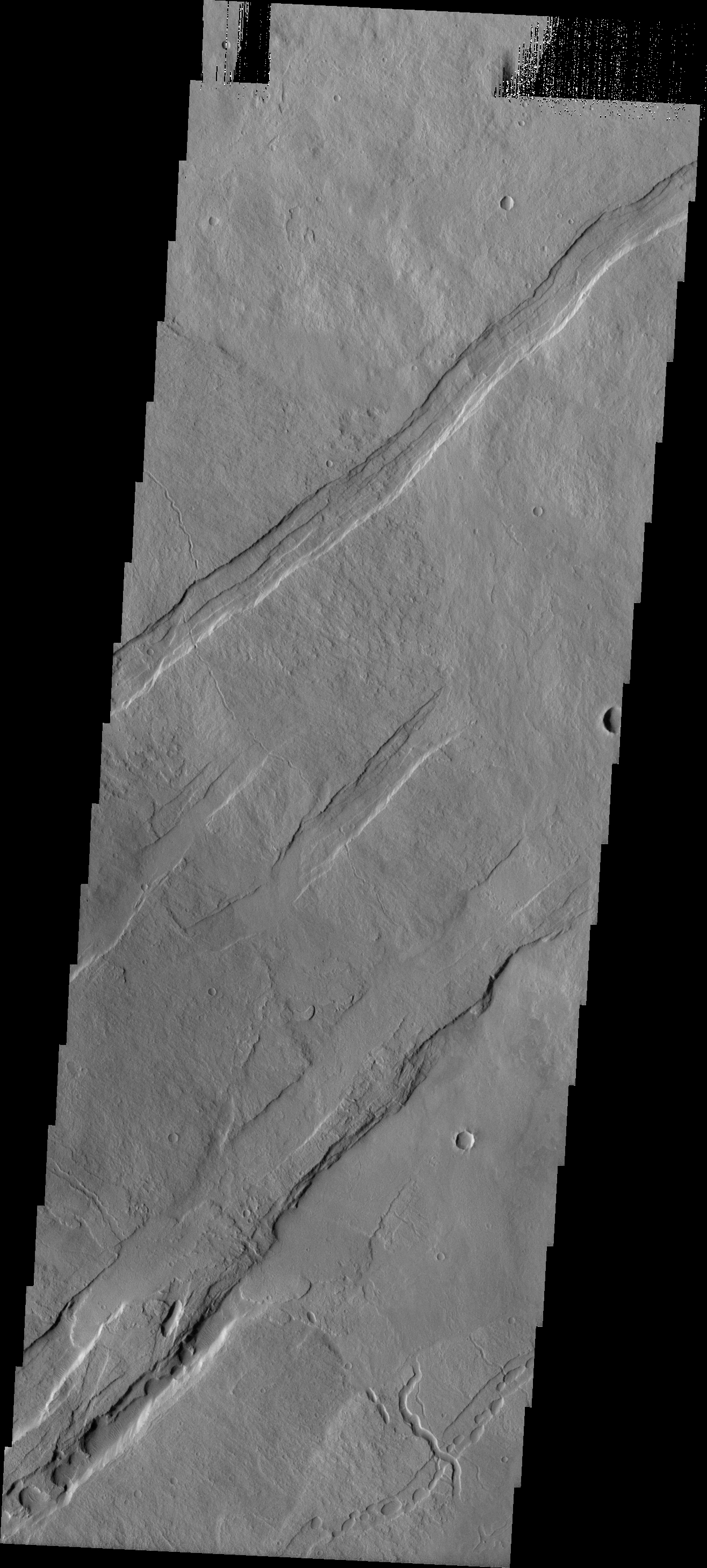
Oti Fossae, as seen by THEMIS. These parallel graben are found on the northeastern side of Arsia Mons; they are in line with the NE/SW trend of the three volcanoes in Tharsis.

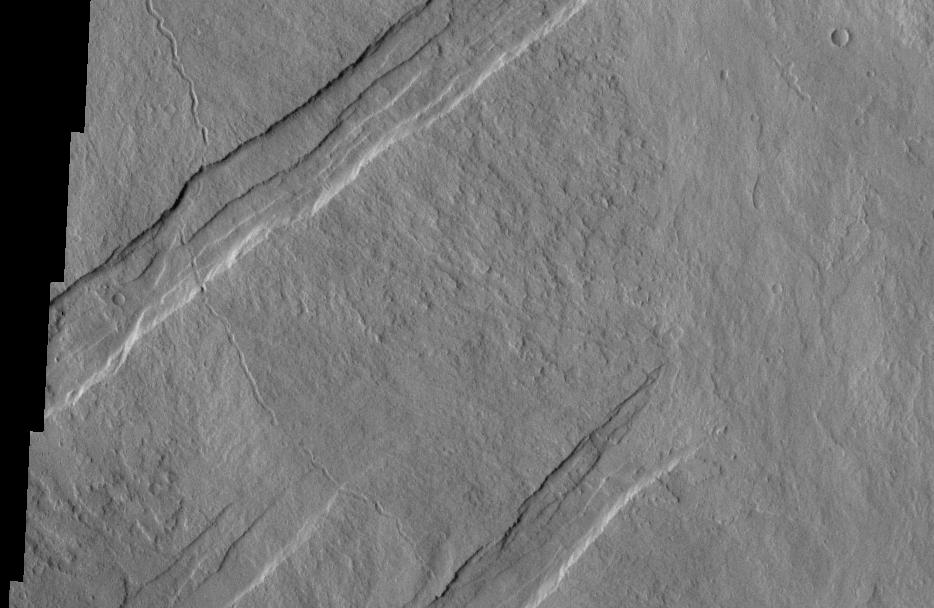
Oti Fossae, as seen by THEMIS. These parallel graben are found on the northeastern side of Arsia Mons; they are in line with the NE/SW trend of the three volcanoes in Tharsis.
