= Ocean transportation intermediary =

An ocean transportation intermediary (OTI) is a company that is licensed by the Federal Maritime Commission (FMC) to operate in the United States as an ocean freight forwarder, non-vessel operating common carrier (NVOCC), or both.
