= International Federation of Freight Forwarders Associations =

International trade association

Coordinates: 46.2067289°N 6.1424997°E

FIATA International Federation of Freight Forwarders Associations
- Abbreviation: FIATA
- Formation: 1926; 100 years ago (in Vienna, Austria)
- Type: Non-governmental organization
- Location: Geneva, Switzerland
- President: Thomas Sim
- Website: fiata.org

The FIATA International Federation of Freight Forwarders Associations is a non-governmental organisation representing freight forwarders worldwide. According to the FIATA Annual Report 2021, FIATA counted 109 Associations Members representing the freight forwarding industry within a territory and 5959 Individual members, representing freight forwarding and logistics companies.

== History and organization ==
FIATA was founded in Vienna, Austria, on 1926 and owes its name to its acronym French: Fédération Internationale des Associations de Transitaires et Assimilés. Also known as the ‘Architects of Transport’, FIATA has Association Members and Individual Members in some 150 countries.

FIATA has consultative status with the United Nations Economic and Social Council (inter alia ECE, ESCAP, ESCWA), the United Nations Conference on Trade and Development, and the UN Commission on International Trade Law. FIATA is recognised as representing the freight forwarding industry by many other governmental organisations, governmental authorities, and private international organisations in the field of transport such as the International Chamber of Commerce, the International Air Transport Association, the International Union of Railways, the International Road Transport Union, the World Customs Organisation, the World Trade Organization, etc.

FIATA is headquartered in Geneva, Switzerland.

== Documents ==
FIATA has created several documents and forms to establish a uniform standard for use by freight forwarders worldwide. The documents are easily distinguishable as each has a distinctive colour and carries the FIATA logo which can be seen at the head of this page.

- FCR: Forwarders Certificate of Receipt
- FCT: Forwarders Certificate of Transport
- FWR: FIATA Warehouse Receipt
- FBL: FIATA Bill of Lading (negotiable Multimodal Transport)
- FWB: FIATA Waybill (non-negotiable Multimodal Transport)
- SDT: Shippers Declaration for the Transport (of Dangerous Goods)
- SIC: Shippers Intermodal Weight Certificate
- FFI: FIATA Forwarding Instructions

== See also ==
- Freight forwarder
- Logistics
- Trade facilitation
