= Liverpool Exchange by-election =

Liverpool Exchange by-election may refer to:

- 1887 Liverpool Exchange by-election
- 1897 Liverpool Exchange by-election
- 1922 Liverpool Exchange by-election
- 1933 Liverpool Exchange by-election
