= 1897 Liverpool Exchange by-election =

UK parliamentary by-election

The 1897 Liverpool Exchange by-election was a by-election held in England on 10 November 1897 for the British House of Commons constituency of Liverpool Exchange.

The Liberal Unionist candidate, Charles McArthur held the seat with a very small majority over his Liberal opponent.

== Vacancy ==
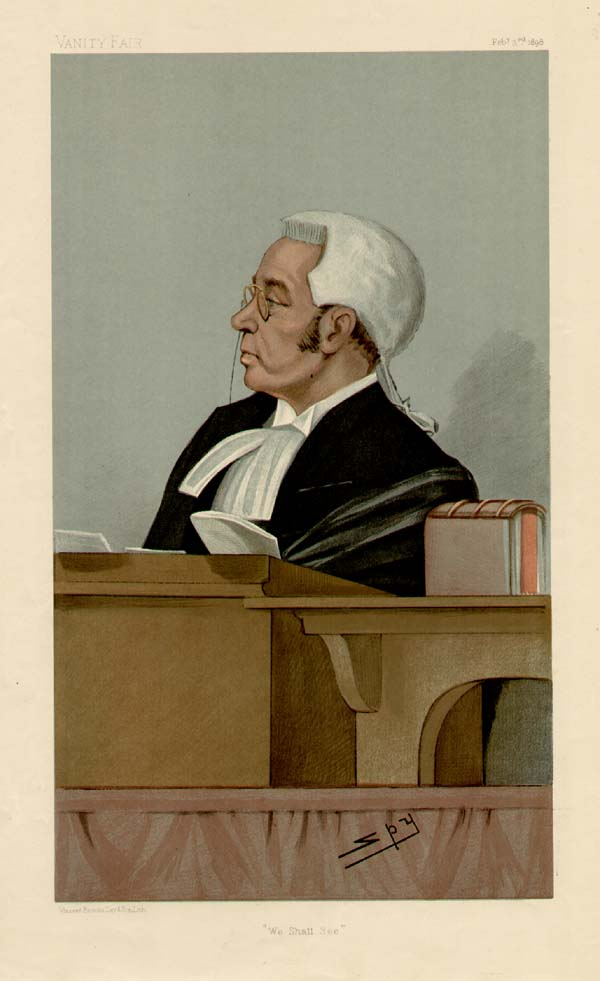
Vanity Fair caricature of John Bigham, whose appointment as a judge triggered the by-election

The seat had become vacant in October 1897 when the Liberal Unionist Member of Parliament (MP), John Bigham, had been appointed as a judge of the Queen's Bench division of the High Court.

He had held the seat since the 1895 general election, having contested it unsuccessfully in 1892.

== Candidates ==
Immediately after Bigham's appointment was announced, The Times newspaper reported on Saturday 16 October that the Liberal Unionist candidate was likely to be Charles McArthur, an average adjuster from Liverpool and former chairman of the city's chamber of commerce. Business people in Liverpool welcomed the prospect of McArthur's candidacy, but while the Liberals met that weekend to consider their options, they postponed a decision.

On Monday 18th, the McArthur accepted a formal invitation to be the Unionist candidate, and he accepted the nomination. Some local Unionists felt that this constituency should be represented by a ship-owner, but others noted McArthur was as much involved in shipping as the owners. He told the selection meeting that his main priority would be to protect the commercial and shipping interests of Liverpool, and that he objected to the River Mersey being "made a cesspool for Manchester" through the construction of the Manchester Ship Canal.

The Liberals interviewed H. Wade Deacon, who had been the Liberal candidate in Widnes at the previous general election, but he refused for personal reasons. They were still without a candidate by the evening of Tuesday 19th, when local ship-owners met to discuss the election. The businessmen were aggrieved at the Unionist government's treatment of shipping and at the unsympathetic reception received by a recent delegation to the President of the Board of Trade, Charles Ritchie. They agreed that it was important to have an MP who supported the ship-owners.

The Times leader-writers observed on 20 October that if the Liberals fielded a prominent ship-owner, McArthur would have a hard fight on his hands. The following day the Liberals selected Russell Rea, the managing director of ship-owning company R. & J. H. Rea. However, in the early 1880s Liverpool-born Rea had relocated his head office to Leadenhall Street in London, and lived in Hackney. His main line of business was in shipping coal for the South Wales coalfields, and despite his shipping interests, The Times reported a claim that Rea was not a member of the Liverpool Steamship-Owners Association.

On the 19th, the local branch of the Irish National League pledged itself to support "any candidate who is thoroughy sound on the Home Rule question".

On the 24th, the Speaker of the House of Commons William Gully gave notice in the London Gazette that by accepting appointment as a judge, Bigham had vacated his seat. The Speaker therefore intended to issue the writ of election in 6 days time. The writ was received on 2 November, and nominations were set for 5 November, with polling on the 10th.

== Constituency ==
The Exchange division included the central business district of Liverpool, which had long been Conservative-leaning, but the constituency had been held by the Liberals for most of existence. Since 1885, it had always been a marginal seat, in which the largest majority had been the 4.4% lead won by Bigham in 1895.

St Anne's and Vauxhall wards contained some of the worst slums in Liverpool, with about 2,000 Irishmen who were all expected to vote Liberal because of that party's support for Irish Home Rule. However, their numbers had been reduced since the general election by the demolition of many condemned buildings, which had removed over 150 Liberal-supporting voters from the electoral register.

Both sides took care to try to trace voters who had moved home since the register was compiled. This was easier for the Unionists, whose merchant supporters were easily identified. However, the working-class Liberal-supporters moved more often, sometimes trying to evade location by creditors or school inspectors. The Liberals found an effective solution by distributing printed lists of untraced voters, asking for information on their current addresses.

== Campaign ==
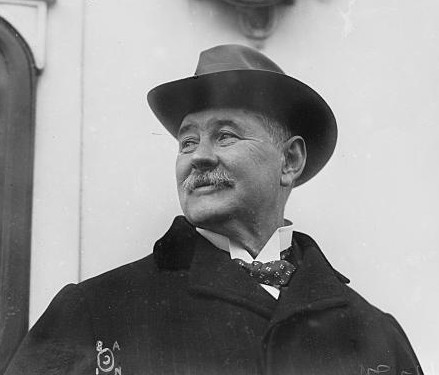
T. P. O'Connor, the Irish Nationalist MP who campaigned for Russell Rea

Rea made support for Irish Home Rule the first item in his election address, and his meeting in Picton Hall on 5 November was addressed by T. P. O'Connor, the Nationalist MP for Liverpool Scotland. George Baden-Powell, the Conservative MP for Liverpool Kirkdale, denounced Rea's stance in a letter to McArthur. He claimed that Rea "surrenders himself as the 'white slave' of their masters, the Nationalists, whose one avowed aim is the disintegration of the United Kingdom, the certain forerunner of the breakup of our great and valiant empire".

Shipping interests dominated much of the campaign, and some Unionist-supporting shipowners were ready to use the election to force the government's hand on the abolition of light dues. On the 25th, McArthur told workers that his opponents were "exploiting" the light dues issue, but that he was equally committed to their abolition, preferring that navigational aids should be funded by central government. Rea held a meeting at Liverpool Town Hall, where Northwich MP Sir John Brunner accused McArthur of bluffing.

However, Rea's opposition to the Workmen's Compensation Act damaged his standing with labourers.

== Election ==
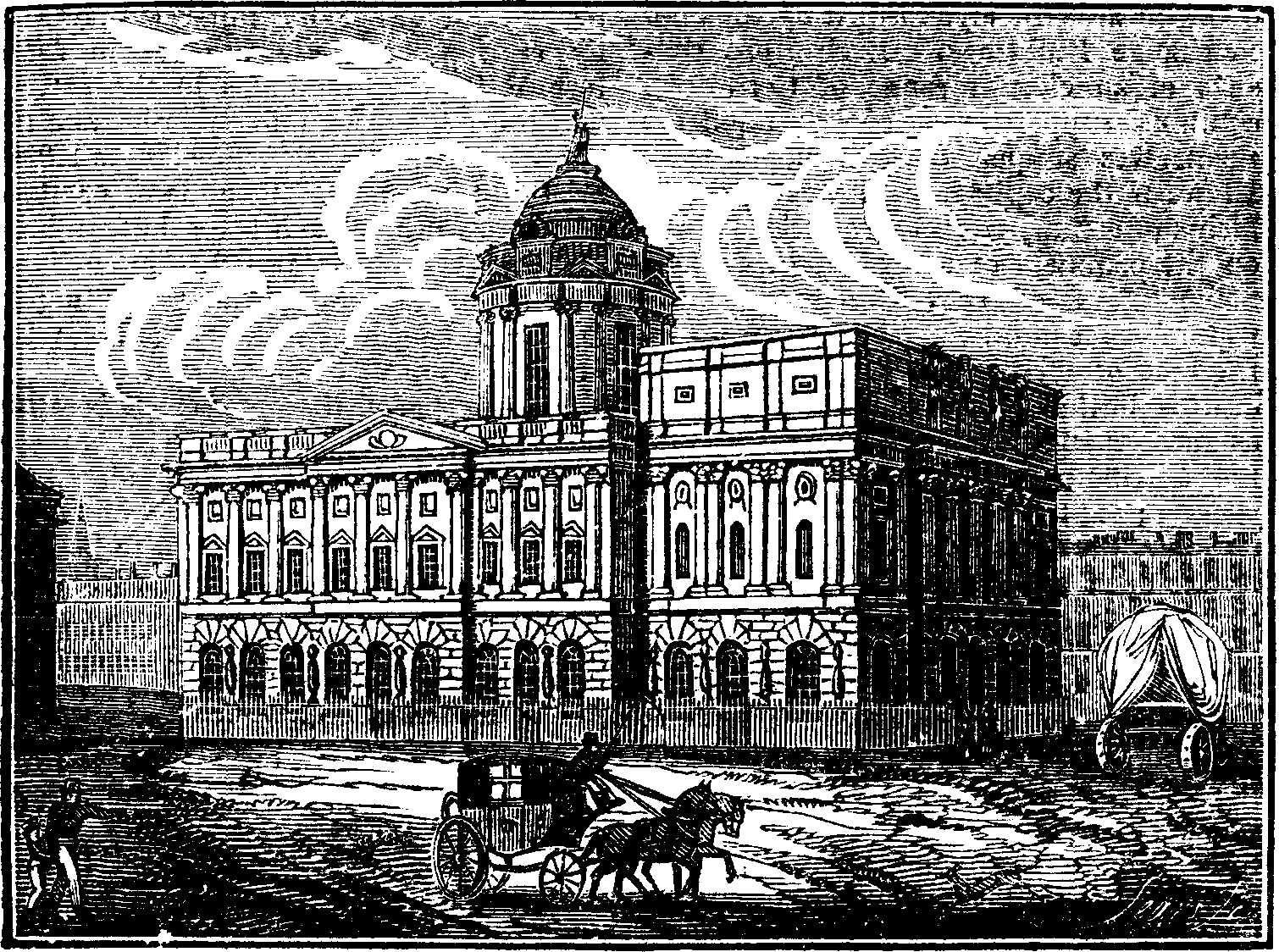
Liverpool Town Hall, where the votes were counted

Polling took place on Wednesday 10 November and both parties worked hard to get out their voters, with each using teams of cyclists to get out the vote. Rumours circulated of votes being cast on behalf of dead people, and two people were charged with that sort of personation.

Early polling was high in nationalist areas, giving the Liberals confidence of victory, but a steady flow of voters in other areas shifted the balance. In Irish areas such as St Anne's Street and Great Crosshall street, bottles were thrown at the carriages of Conservative supporters.

The votes were counted that evening in Liverpool Town Hall, and as the tallies were completed it was reported that Rea had won the seat with a majority of 47 votes. Local newspapers reported a Liberal victory, but a recount found a bundle of misplaced ballot papers, and shortly after 10pm the result was declared by the Lord Mayor John Houlding as a 54-vote majority for McArthur.

== Aftermath ==
McArthur was re-elected in 1900, but was defeated at the next election, in 1906. He was returned as the MP for Liverpool Kirkdale at a by-election in 1907, and held the seat until his death in 1910.

Rea was elected in 1900 as the MP for Gloucester, and held the seat until his defeat in January 1910. Later that year he won a by-election for South Shields, and held that seat until his death in 1916, having served briefly as a Junior Lord of the Treasury.

== Results ==
Election	Political result	Candidate	Party	Votes	%	±%
By-election, November 1897 resignation of Bigham; Electorate: 7,060; Turnout: 5,368 (76.0%) −2.1	Liberal Unionist hold Majority: 54 (1.0%) −3.6; Swing: 1.8% from LibU to Lib	Charles McArthur	Liberal Unionist	2,711	50.5	−1.8
By-election, November 1897 resignation of Bigham; Electorate: 7,060; Turnout: 5,368 (76.0%) −2.1	Liberal Unionist hold Majority: 54 (1.0%) −3.6; Swing: 1.8% from LibU to Lib	Russell Rea	Liberal	2,657	49.5	+1.8
General election, 1895; Electorate: 7,063; Turnout: 5,514 (78.1%) +6.6	Liberal Unionist gain from Liberal; Majority: 254 (4.6%); Swing: 2.9% from Lib to LibU	John Bigham	Liberal Unionist	2,884	52.3	+2.9
General election, 1895; Electorate: 7,063; Turnout: 5,514 (78.1%) +6.6	Liberal Unionist gain from Liberal; Majority: 254 (4.6%); Swing: 2.9% from Lib to LibU	W. B. Bowring	Liberal	2,630	47.7	−2.9

== See also ==
- Liverpool Exchange (UK Parliament constituency)
- 1887 Liverpool Exchange by-election
- 1922 Liverpool Exchange by-election
- 1933 Liverpool Exchange by-election
- Liverpool
- Lists of United Kingdom by-elections
