= Henry Robert Reynolds =

English Congregational minister, college head and writer

Henry Robert Reynolds (26 February 1825 – 10 September 1896) was an English Congregational minister, college head and writer.

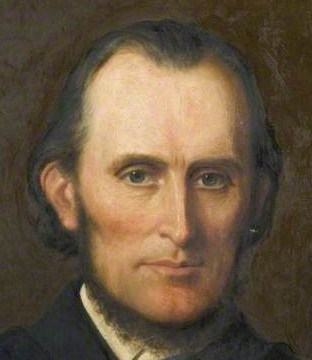
Henry Robert Reynolds, detail from 1882 portrait by Joseph Sydney Willis Hodges

== Life ==
Born at Romsey, Hampshire on 26 February 1825, he was the grandson of Henry Revell Reynolds, and the elder son of John Reynolds (1782–1862), Congregational minister, by his second wife Sarah (died 1868), daughter of Robert Fletcher of Chester and sister of Joseph Fletcher; Sir John Russell Reynolds was his younger brother. Educated mainly by his father, in September 1841 he entered Coward College, London to prepare for the ministry. He matriculated at London University in the same year, obtaining the university mathematical scholarship in 1844 and graduating with a BA in 1848. In the same year he was made a fellow of University College, London.

In April 1846 Reynolds became pastor of the congregational church at Halstead in Essex, receiving permission to curtail his course at Coward College. He was ordained on 16 July 1846; among his congregation was the future missionary Matthew Atmore Sherring, whose father was one of Reynolds's deacons. In 1849 Reynolds accepted a call to be minister of the East Parade chapel at Leeds, entering on the duties on 28 March. In 1855 his health gave way, and during next five years he spent time on visits to Egypt, Italy, and the south of France, being frequently ill.

In June 1860 Reynolds accepted the post of president of Cheshunt College, where he moved in August, and acted as professor of dogmatic theology, ecclesiastical history, and New Testament exegesis. From 1866 to 1874 he was co-editor with Henry Allon of the British Quarterly Review, and from 1877 to 1882 he edited the Evangelical Magazine. In 1869 he received an honorary degree (DD) from the University of Edinburgh, and in the next few years he was engaged on the project of enlarging the Cheshunt College buildings, in celebration of the centenary of the institution. This work was completed in 1872.

In November 1894 failing health compelled Reynolds to resign the presidency of Cheshunt College, and in May 1895 he retired to Broxbourne in Hertfordshire. He died there on 10 September 1896, and was buried in Cheshunt cemetery on 15 September.

== Works ==
In 1888 appeared Reynolds's best known work, the "Introduction" and "Exposition" on the Gospel of St John, contributed to the Pulpit Commentary. Other works were:

- The Beginnings of the Divine Life: a Course of Seven Sermons, London, 1859.
- Notes of the Christian Life: a Selection of Sermons, London, 1865.
- The Philosophy of Prayer and Principles of Christian Service; with other Papers, London, 1881.
- Buddhism : a Comparison and a Contrast between Buddhism and Christianity ('Present Day Tracts, 2nd ser. No. 46), London, 1886.
- Athanasius : his Life and Lifework (Church History Series, No. 5), London, 1889.
- Light and Peace: Sermons and Addresses (Preachers of the Age), London, 1892,
- Lamps of the Temple, and other Addresses to Young Men, London, 1895.
- Who say ye that I am? (Present Day Tracts, No. 80), London, 1896.

Reynolds edited the Congregational Register for the West Riding of Yorkshire (London) from 1855 to 1857, and undertook in 1884, with Owen Charles Whitehouse, the prophecies of Hosea and Amos in An Old Testament Commentary for English Readers. With his brother, John Russell Reynolds, he wrote a novel dealing with the intellectual and religious questions of the time, which was published anonymously in 1860 with the title Yes and No.

Reynolds made a study of the writings of Auguste Comte, on whom he published a criticism in the British Quarterly Review in April 1854. In 1870 and 1871 he edited two series of essays on church problems by various writers, entitled Ecclesia, and in 1874 he published lectures on "John the Baptist" in the new series of Congregational Union Lectures. They reached a third edition in 1888. He wrote frequently for The Expositor, and contributed to the Dictionary of Christian Biography.

== Family ==
On 17 December 1840, at Walworth chapel, Reynolds married Louisa Caroline (died 11 October 1895), the only surviving daughter of Silas Palmer of Newbury, Berkshire. They had no children.

== Notes ==
Attribution

This article incorporates text from a publication now in the public domain: Lee, Sidney, ed. (1901). "Reynolds, Henry Robert". Dictionary of National Biography (1st supplement). Vol. 3. London: Smith, Elder & Co.
