= 1922 Liverpool Exchange by-election =

UK parliamentary by-election

The 1922 Liverpool Exchange by-election was a by-election held in England for the British House of Commons constituency of Liverpool Exchange on 13 March 1922.

This was a ministerial by-election, held under laws in force until 1926 which required an MP appointed to government to seek re-election. The Conservative Party candidate Leslie Scott was re-elected.

== Vacancy ==
The seat had become vacant on 9 March 1922 when the Conservative Member of Parliament (MP), Leslie Scott had been appointed as Solicitor General for England and Wales. He had held the seat since the December 1910 general election.

== Candidates ==
While Scott's appointment was not Gazetted until 9 March, it had been announced on 6 March. On Wednesday 8 March, the Irish Nationalist Party in Liverpool decided to contest the seat. The Nationalist candidate A. Harford had been Scott's only opponent in 1918, when he had won 44.4% of the votes, and a delegation was sent to ask Harford to stand again. The independent Liberals who had remained outside David Lloyd George's Conservative-dominated coalition government were initially undecided on whether to contest the election, and Scott addressed the local Coalition Liberals to seek their support.

Nominations were set for 13 March, and polling for 22 March. However, on Sunday 12 March, the Nationalists decided not to contest the seat, and when nominations closed, Scott was the only candidate.

== Result ==
Since only one candidate was nominated, there was no need for a vote. Scott was returned unopposed.

== Aftermath ==
Scott was knighted on 31 March that year, but served for only 6 months as Solicitor General. He retired from Parliament at the 1929 general election, and after returning to his legal practice he became a judge in 1935.

== See also ==
- Liverpool Exchange (UK Parliament constituency)
- 1887 Liverpool Exchange by-election
- 1897 Liverpool Exchange by-election
- 1933 Liverpool Exchange by-election
- Liverpool
- List of United Kingdom by-elections
