= John Shute (politician) =

British politician

Colonel Sir John Joseph Shute CMG DSO TD DL JP (6 September 1873 – 13 September 1948) was a British volunteer soldier, businessman and Conservative Party politician in the United Kingdom.

== Biography ==
Born in Liverpool, he was educated at St Edward's College (then the Catholic Institute of Liverpool).

His business career saw him acting as a partner in various Liverpool-based firms of cotton brokers. He was also chairman of Combined Egyptian Mills Ltd, based in Howe Bridge, near Wigan.

=== Military career ===
In 1896, he was promoted to lieutenant in the 1st Volunteer Battalion, King's (Liverpool) Regiment, and in 1900 to captain. The 1st Volunteer Battalion became the 5th Battalion on the establishment of the Territorial Force in 1908. Shute transferred to the 5th with many of his colleagues. He served in the unit during the First World War, reaching the rank of lieutenant-colonel and being awarded the Distinguished Service Order (DSO), the Territorial Decoration (TD) and in the 1918 King's Birthday Honours he was made a Companion of the Order of Saint Michael and Saint George (CMG) for his military services. He remained in the TA after the war, being promoted to colonel in 1923. He retired in 1930.

=== Political career ===
He was elected as Member of Parliament (MP) for Liverpool Exchange at a by-election in 1933 following the death of the Conservative MP Sir James Reynolds. Shute was re-elected in 1935, and held the seat until his narrow defeat at the 1945 general election by the Labour Party candidate Bessie Braddock.

== Honours ==
In 1921, he was appointed a deputy lieutenant for the County Palatine of Lancaster. He was knighted in the New Year Honours, 1935, "for political, public and social services in Lancashire, particularly in Liverpool". In 1938 he was appointed honorary colonel of a sub-unit of the Royal Army Service Corps, relinquishing the appointment in 1948.

== Notes ==
Parliament of the United Kingdom
Preceded by Sir James Reynolds	Member of Parliament for Liverpool Exchange; 1933–1945	Succeeded by Bessie Braddock
