= Liverpool Exchange =

Parliamentary constituency in the United Kingdom, 1885–1974

- Former borough constituency for the House of Commons

1885–1974
- Seats: One
- Created from: Liverpool
- Replaced by: Liverpool Scotland Exchange

Liverpool Exchange was a borough constituency within the city of Liverpool in England, centred on Liverpool Exchange railway station. It returned one Member of Parliament (MP) to the House of Commons of the Parliament of the United Kingdom, elected by the first past the post system.

The constituency was created under the Redistribution of Seats Act 1885 for the 1885 general election. It was abolished for the February 1974 election, when it was merged with Liverpool Scotland to form Liverpool Scotland Exchange.

== Boundaries ==
The constituency covered the centre of the city of Liverpool, bordering on the River Mersey. It included the commercial area of the city, as well as poorer housing. It originally consisted of the wards of Vauxhall, St Ann Street, Lime Street, Exchange, and St Paul's.

=== 1885–1918 ===
The Exchange Ward, with a significant Conservative business vote, was combined with the St Anne's and Vauxhall wards (which were more Liberal and contained a substantial Irish vote).

The Scotland division, to the north of this seat, was more heavily Irish and returned an Irish Nationalist MP. Exchange was a Liberal/Conservative and Allies marginal constituency and its elections were influenced by what guidance the electors were given by Nationalist leaders.

=== 1918–1950 ===
In this period the seat was defined as comprising the Abercromby, Castle Street, Exchange, Great George, St Anne's, St Peter's, and Vauxhall wards.

In this era the area was represented by Conservative Members of Parliament, until the Labour Party captured the seat in 1945.

=== 1950–1955 ===
Brunswick, and Granby wards were added to those previously in the seat.

=== 1955–1974 ===
The constituency comprised Abercromby, Central, Granby, Low Hill, and St James wards.

In the redistribution which took effect in 1974, this seat disappeared. However the successor constituency was named Liverpool Scotland Exchange, combining as it did the central and northern riverside parts of the city.

== Members of Parliament ==
Year	Member	Party
1885	Laurence Baily	Conservative
1886	David Duncan	Liberal
1887	Ralph Neville	Liberal
1895	John Bigham	Liberal Unionist
1897	Charles McArthur	Liberal Unionist
1906	Richard Cherry	Liberal
1910	Max Muspratt	Liberal
1910	Leslie Scott	Conservative
1929	Sir James Reynolds	Conservative
1933	John Shute	Conservative
1945	Bessie Braddock	Labour
1970	Robert Parry	Labour
1974	constituency abolished	

== Election results ==
=== Elections in the 1880s ===
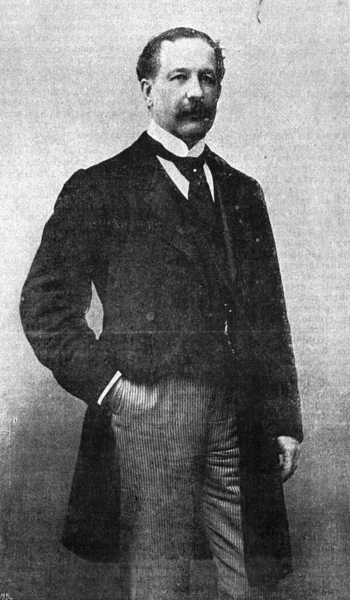
O'Shea

General election 1885: Liverpool Exchange
Party	Candidate	Votes	%	±%
Conservative	Laurence Richardson Baily	2,964	50.2	
Liberal	William O'Shea	2,909	49.2	
Independent Liberal	Thomas English Stephens	36	0.6	
Majority		55	1.0	
Turnout		5,909	72.3	
Registered electors		8,171		
Conservative win (new seat)				

- O'Shea had originally announced his intention to stand as an Irish Nationalist candidate. When he later secured the support of the Liberal Party, Stephens retired in favour of him.

General election 1886: Liverpool Exchange
Party	Candidate	Votes	%	±%
Liberal	David Duncan	2,920	51.5	+2.3
Conservative	Laurence Richardson Baily	2,750	48.5	−1.7
Majority		170	3.0	N/A
Turnout		5,670	69.4	−2.9
Registered electors		8,171		
Liberal gain from Conservative		Swing	+2.0	

Duncan's death caused a by-election.

Goschen

By-election, 26 Jan 1887: Liverpool Exchange
Party	Candidate	Votes	%	±%
Liberal	Ralph Neville	3,217	50.1	−1.4
Liberal Unionist	George Goschen	3,210	49.9	+1.4
Majority		7	0.2	−2.8
Turnout		6,427	81.2	+11.8
Registered electors		7,911		
Liberal hold		Swing	−1.4	

=== Elections in the 1890s ===
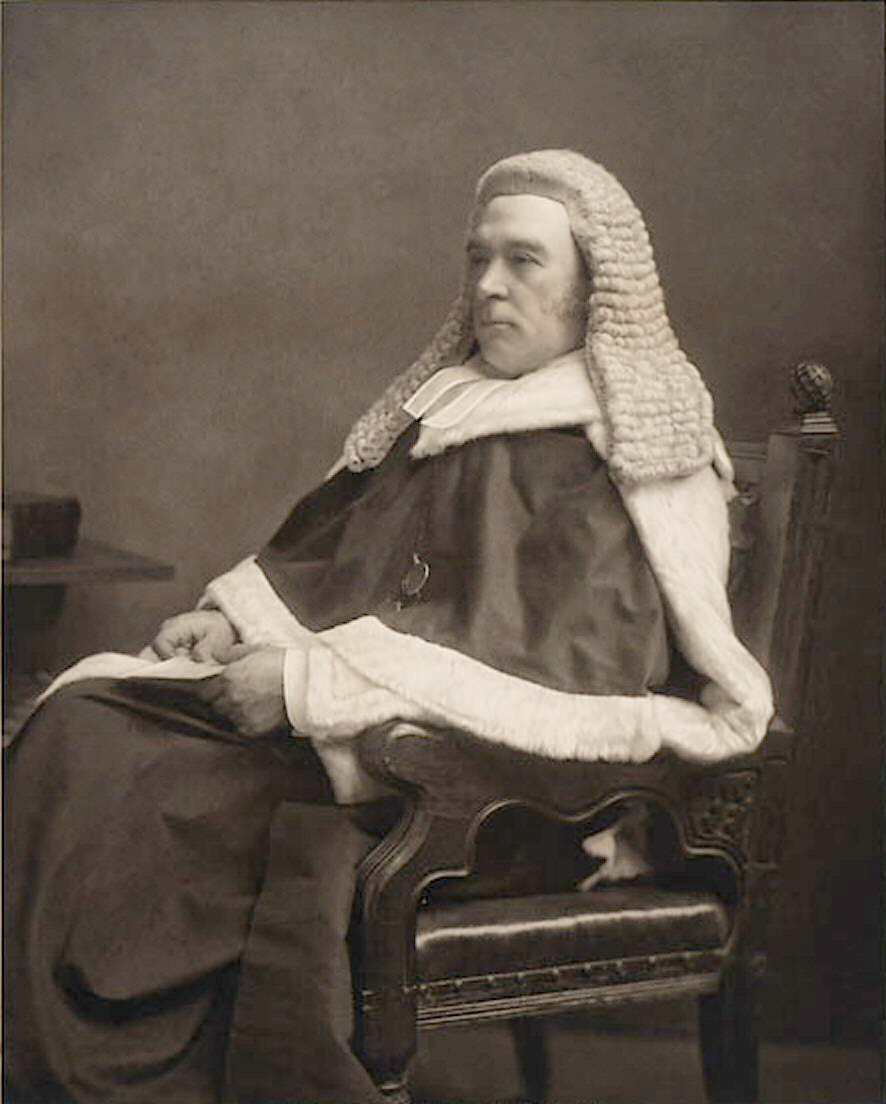
Bigham

General election 1892: Liverpool Exchange
Party	Candidate	Votes	%	±%
Liberal	Ralph Neville	2,721	50.6	−0.9
Liberal Unionist	John Bigham	2,655	49.4	+0.9
Majority		66	1.2	−1.8
Turnout		5,376	71.5	+2.1
Registered electors		7,518		
Liberal hold		Swing	−0.9	

General election 1895: Liverpool Exchange
Party	Candidate	Votes	%	±%
Liberal Unionist	John Bigham	2,884	52.3	+2.9
Liberal	William Bowring	2,630	47.7	−2.9
Majority		254	4.6	N/A
Turnout		5,514	78.1	+6.6
Registered electors		7,063		
Liberal Unionist gain from Liberal		Swing	+2.9	

Bigham is appointed a judge on the Queen's Bench division of the High Court of Justice, and resigned.

Rea

1897 Liverpool Exchange by-election
Party	Candidate	Votes	%	±%
Liberal Unionist	Charles McArthur	2,711	50.5	−1.8
Liberal	Russell Rea	2,657	49.5	+1.8
Majority		54	1.0	−3.6
Turnout		5,368	76.0	−2.1
Registered electors		7,060		
Liberal Unionist hold		Swing	−1.8	

=== Elections in the 1900s ===
Verney

General election 1900: Liverpool Exchange
Party	Candidate	Votes	%	±%
Liberal Unionist	Charles McArthur	2,811	65.0	+12.7
Liberal	Frederick Verney	1,514	35.0	―12.7
Majority		1,297	30.0	+25.4
Turnout		5,325	64.4	―13.7
Registered electors		6,718		
Liberal Unionist hold		Swing	+12.7	

Cherry

General election 1906: Liverpool Exchange
Party	Candidate	Votes	%	±%
Liberal	Richard Cherry	2,291	51.4	+16.4
Liberal Unionist	Charles McArthur	2,170	48.6	−16.4
Majority		121	2.8	N/A
Turnout		4,461	75.7	+11.3
Registered electors		5,891		
Liberal gain from Liberal Unionist		Swing	+16.4	

=== Elections in the 1910s ===
General election January 1910: Liverpool Exchange
Party	Candidate	Votes	%	±%
Liberal	Max Muspratt	2,392	51.7	+0.3
Conservative	Leslie Scott	2,231	48.3	−0.3
Majority		161	3.4	+0.6
Turnout		4,623	82.5	+6.8
Liberal hold		Swing		

General election December 1910: Liverpool Exchange
Party	Candidate	Votes	%	±%
Conservative	Leslie Scott	2,330	51.6	+3.3
Liberal	Max Muspratt	2,187	48.4	−3.3
Majority		143	3.2	N/A
Turnout		4,517	80.6	−1.9
Conservative gain from Liberal		Swing	+3.3	

General Election 1914–15:

Another General Election was required to take place before the end of 1915. The political parties had been making preparations for an election to take place and by July 1914, the following candidates had been selected;

- Unionist: Leslie Scott
- Liberal:

General election 1918: Liverpool Exchange
Party		Candidate	Votes	%	±%
C	Unionist	Leslie Scott	10,286	55.6	+4.0
	Irish Nationalist	Austin Harford	8,225	44.4	New
Majority			2,061	11.2	+8.0
Turnout			18,511	52.0	―28.6
	Unionist hold		Swing		
C indicates candidate endorsed by the coalition government.

=== Elections in the 1920s ===
1922 Liverpool Exchange by-election
Party	Candidate	Votes	%	±%
Unionist	Leslie Scott	Unopposed	N/A	N/A
Unionist hold				

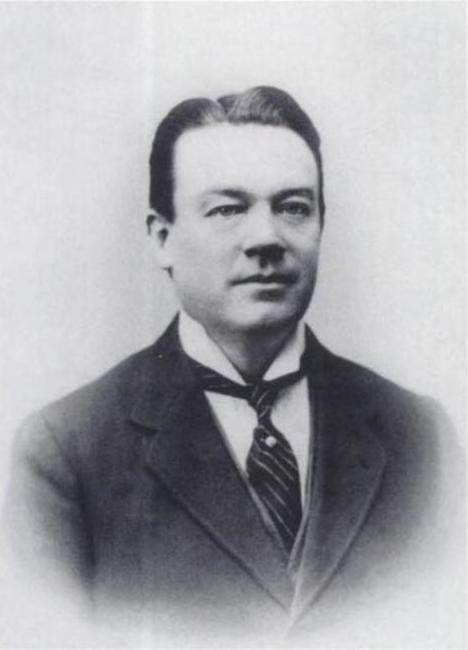
Devlin

General election 1922: Liverpool Exchange
Party	Candidate	Votes	%	±%
Unionist	Leslie Scott	15,650	55.4	N/A
Irish Nationalist	Joseph Devlin	12,614	44.6	New
Majority		3,036	10.8	N/A
Turnout		28,264	74.8	N/A
Unionist hold		Swing	N/A	

General election 1923: Liverpool Exchange
Party	Candidate	Votes	%	±%
Unionist	Leslie Scott	10,551	50.5	―4.9
Irish Nationalist	William Grogan	10,322	49.5	+4.9
Majority		229	1.0	―9.8
Turnout		20,873	51.9	―22.9
Unionist hold		Swing	―4.9	

General election 1924: Liverpool Exchange
Party	Candidate	Votes	%	±%
Unionist	Leslie Scott	Unopposed	N/A	N/A
Unionist hold				

General election 1929: Liverpool Exchange
Party	Candidate	Votes	%	±%
Unionist	James Reynolds	17,179	50.3	N/A
Labour	William Albert Robinson	16,970	49.7	New
Majority		209	0.6	N/A
Turnout		34,149	65.9	N/A
Unionist hold		Swing	N/A	

=== Elections in the 1930s ===
General election 1931: Liverpool Exchange
Party	Candidate	Votes	%	±%
Conservative	James Reynolds	24,038	68.8	+18.5
Labour	Tom McLean	10,894	31.2	―18.5
Majority		13,144	37.6	+37.0
Turnout		34,902	69.0	+3.1
Conservative hold		Swing	+18.5	

By-election 1933: Liverpool Exchange
Party	Candidate	Votes	%	±%
Conservative	John Shute	15,198	55.0	―13.8
Labour	Sydney Silverman	12,412	45.0	+13.8
Majority		2,786	10.0	―26.6
Turnout		27,610	55.2	―13.8
Conservative hold		Swing	―13.8	

General election 1935: Liverpool Exchange
Party	Candidate	Votes	%	±%
Conservative	John Shute	17,439	57.2	+2.2
Labour	S. Mahon	13,027	42.8	―2.2
Majority		4,412	14.4	+4.4
Turnout		30,466	65.7	+10.5
Conservative hold		Swing	+2.2	

General Election 1939–40 Another General Election was required to take place before the end of 1940. The political parties had been making preparations for an election to take place and by the Autumn of 1939, the following candidates had been selected;

- Conservative: John Shute
- Labour:

=== Elections in the 1940s ===
General election 1945: Liverpool Exchange
Party	Candidate	Votes	%	±%
Labour	Bessie Braddock	8,494	52.0	+9.2
Conservative	John Shute	7,829	48.0	―9.2
Majority		665	4.0	N/A
Turnout		16,323	60.9	―4.8
Labour gain from Conservative		Swing	+9.2	

=== Elections in the 1950s ===
General election 1950: Liverpool Exchange
Party	Candidate	Votes	%	±%
Labour	Bessie Braddock	19,492	57.3	+5.3
Conservative	John Reynolds	14,150	41.6	―6.4
Independent Labour	A.G. Cleather	381	1.1	New
Majority		5,342	15.7	+11.7
Turnout		34,023	72.8	+11.9
Labour hold		Swing	+5.9	

General election 1951: Liverpool Exchange
Party	Candidate	Votes	%	±%
Labour	Bessie Braddock	19,887	60.4	+3.1
Conservative	John O. Tiernan	13,052	39.6	―2.0
Majority		6,835	20.8	+5.1
Turnout		32,939	69.2	―3.6
Labour hold		Swing		

General election 1955: Liverpool Exchange
Party	Candidate	Votes	%	±%
Labour	Bessie Braddock	19,457	56.1	―4.3
Conservative	Anne Elizabeth Papworth	12,271	35.4	―4.2
Independent Labour	Lawrence Murphy	2,928	8.4	New
Majority		7,186	20.7	―0.1
Turnout		34,656	62.5	―6.7
Labour hold		Swing	±0.0	

General election 1959: Liverpool Exchange
Party	Candidate	Votes	%	±%
Labour	Bessie Braddock	18,916	61.3	+5.2
Conservative	Tom Beattie-Edwards	11,945	38.7	+3.3
Majority		6,971	22.6	+1.9
Turnout		30,861	60.5	―2.0
Labour hold		Swing	+1.0	

=== Elections in the 1960s ===
General election 1964: Liverpool Exchange
Party	Candidate	Votes	%	±%
Labour	Bessie Braddock	16,985	70.1	+8.8
Conservative	Vincent Burke	7,239	29.9	―8.8
Majority		9,746	40.2	+17.6
Turnout		24,224	54.4	―6.1
Labour hold		Swing	+8.8	

General election 1966: Liverpool Exchange
Party	Candidate	Votes	%	±%
Labour	Bessie Braddock	15,089	73.7	+3.6
Conservative	Barry Vincent Groombridge	5,372	26.3	―3.6
Majority		9,717	47.4	+7.2
Turnout		20,461	50.7	―3.7
Labour hold		Swing	+3.6	

=== Elections in the 1970s ===
General election 1970: Liverpool Exchange
Party	Candidate	Votes	%	±%
Labour	Robert Parry	12,995	70.6	―3.1
Conservative	Anthony G. Phillips	4,638	25.2	―1.1
Communist	Roger O'Hara	775	4.2	New
Majority		8,357	45.4	―2.0
Turnout		18,408	53.4	+2.7
Labour hold		Swing	―1.0	
