= Laurence Richardson Baily =

British politician

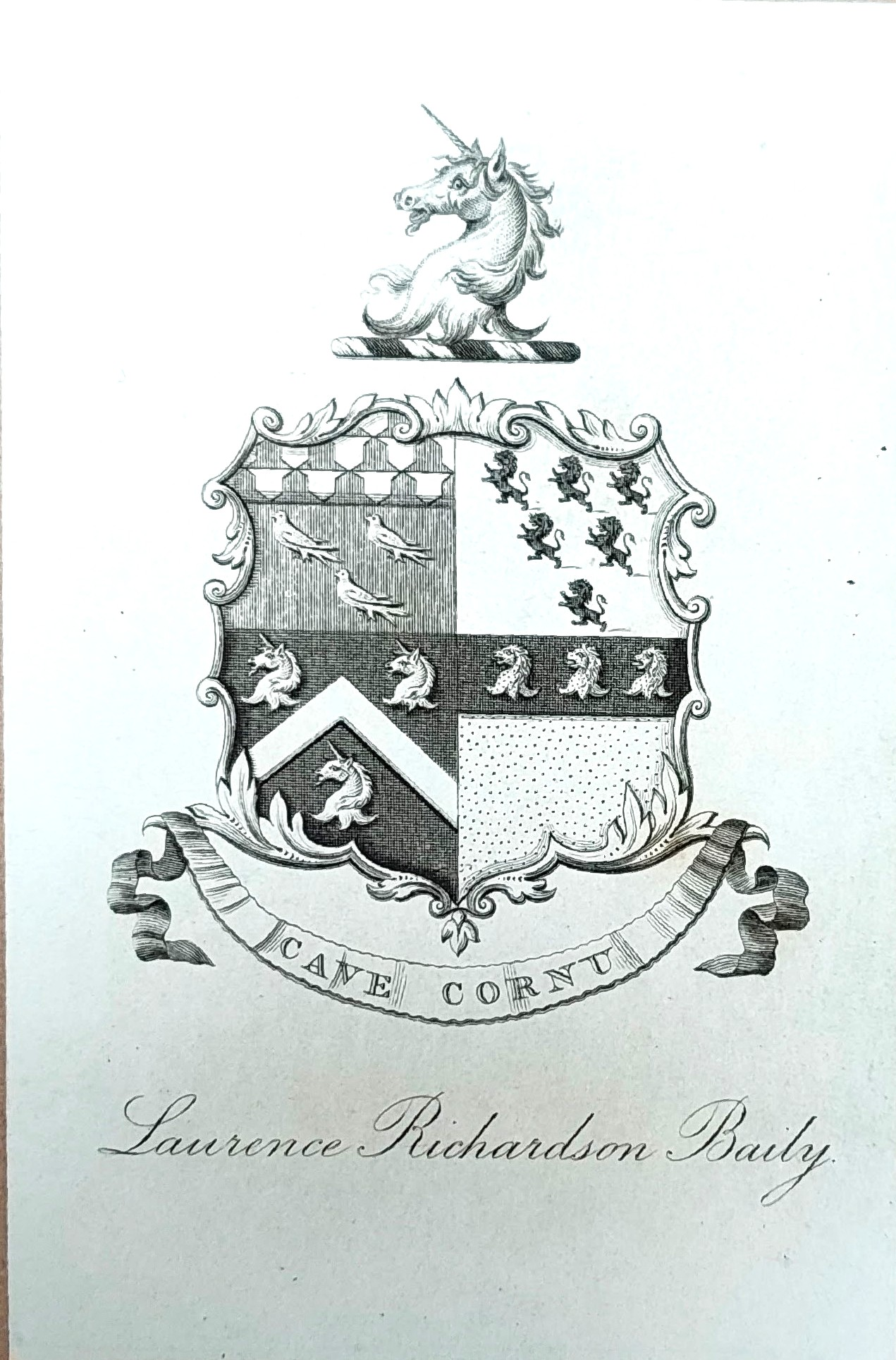
Bookplate ("Ex Libris") in book once owned by Laurence Richardson Baily, MP

Laurence Richardson Baily (9 July 1815 – 18 April 1887) was an English marine insurance specialist, director of transport companies and Conservative politician who sat in the House of Commons from 1885 to 1886.

Baily was born at Tottenham, the son of John Baily of Gartley House, Kent and his wife Sarah Head. He was educated at Merchant Taylors' School and in Paris. He became a marine insurance average adjuster (a claims specialist) based in Liverpool. Progressing to directing transport companies, he became a director of the Great Northern Railway, of the Buffalo and Lake Huron Railway, and of the Pacific Steam Navigation Company. He was chairman of British Continental African Company and of Reliance Marine Insurance Company, and a government nominee on the Mersey Docks and Harbour Board. He was president of the Liverpool Chamber of Commerce and was a J.P. for Liverpool

Baily stood for parliament unsuccessfully at Sunderland in the 1874 general election. In the 1885 general election, Baily was elected Member of Parliament for Liverpool Exchange but lost the seat in the 1886 general election by 200 votes to a Home Rule candidate. He died a few months later at the age of 71.

Baily married Mary Smith of Liverpool in 1850 and they lived at Allerton Hall, Woolton, Liverpool.

Parliament of the United Kingdom
New constituency Liverpool constituency divided	Member of Parliament for Liverpool Exchange; 1885 – 1886	Succeeded by David Duncan
