= Ralph Neville (judge) =

British politician and judge (1848–1918)

Sir Ralph Neville (13 September 1848 – 13 October 1918) was an English barrister, politician and judge of the Chancery Court.

== Life ==
Neville was the son of Henry Neville, a surgeon, of Esher, and was educated at Tonbridge School and at Emmanuel College, Cambridge, where he graduated BA in 1871. At the university he was known as a good oarsman. He rowed in the Emmanuel May boat in 1868, when it was fourth on the river. He stroked the college boat in the CUBC fours, and it was beaten only in the final heat. In the same year he got his trial cap. though he did not succeed in getting into the University boat.

He was called to the bar by Lincoln's Inn in 1872, but had little work in London, and, after a few years' waiting, he went to Liverpool as a "local," it is said upon the advice of Sir Henry Jackson, whose pupil he had been. There he practised in the Chancery Court of the County Palatine of Lancaster and in the Court of Passage. As a junior both in these Courts and on the Northern Circuit he acquired a large practice. Eventually he returned to London, and took silk in 1888. At this time, Sir Marshall Warmington was at the height of his renown, and Neville, who had the most versatile intellect, was looked upon as an easy second to him in the Court of Mr. Justice Kekewich. Soon, Warmington "went special" and Neville obtained the leading practice before that Judge, and afterwards before Mr. Justice Romer.

In the meantime, he had given attention to politics. As a Gladstonian Liberal he contested the Exchange Division of Liverpool in a by-election against George Goschen, and was returned by seven votes. Fiver later he retained the seat with an increased majority against John Bigham who stood as a Liberal Unionist. Neville's services to his party were thus considerable, and it was natural that he should be chosen, not only because of them, but because of his eminence at the Bar, to succeed Mr. Justice Farwell on his promotion to the Court of Appeal in 1906.

== Judicial career ==
As a judge, Neville was successful, particularly in witness actions. At first he was inclined to be a little hasty in his judgements, but afterwards his decisions were rarely reversed on appeal. He was invariably painstaking and courteous, and it had been hoped at the Bar that an opportunity might arise to find him a place in the Court of Appeal. He had been called upon to hear several heavy and difficult cases, such as In re the Law Guarantee Trust and Accident Society (Limited), Re the Birkbeck Permanent Building Society, in which his decision was affirmed by the Court of Appeal, though the order of that Court was varied in the House of Lords, and the famous Osborne case, in which his decision that a rule of a trade union authorizing the application of union funds in payment of Labour members of Parliament was not ultra vires was reversed.

His obituary states Neville was by instinct a clever advocate; by experience he became a sound, but not a brilliant lawyer. From the outset of his career he showed great ability in the handling of his cases, but it was only when his powers began to be recognized that he turned to a sufficiently close study of the law. It seemed as if the pleader by nature turned lawyer with reluctance. But if they were reluctance it yielded to a passion for hard work. Few men at the Bar burnt more of the midnight oil, and, though in recent years his health began to fail, a physical endurance, begotten, no doubt, of his athletic training, together with an extraordinarily alert and active mind, carried him through periods of toil in which others could not have long survived. In the management of witnesses, especially in cross-examination, he had n his time no rival at the Chancery Bar, and few, if any, equals on the Common Law side. No man possessed more fully the gift of divining quickly the temperament of a witness, of framing his questions in terse and homely language, and of coaxing a vital admission, as if he were merely seeking the disclosure of a harmless fact. But this was not the limit of his skill as an advocate. He had remarkable faculty for following the mind of the Judge before whom he was practising.

== Family ==
Neville married Edith Cranstoun Macnamara, eldest daughter of Mr. H. T. J. Macnamara, who was at one time a Judge of County Courts and a Railway Commissioner. In 1906, Neville was granted a coat of arms, blazoned as follows: Per chevron in chief paly of four ermine and gules in base gyronny of eight of the same, with a crest: On a wreath of the colours, in front of a bull's head erased sable, three fleur-de-lis in fesse or.

Parliament of the United Kingdom
Preceded by David Duncan	Member of Parliament for Liverpool Exchange; 1887–1895	Succeeded by John Bigham
