= Sir James Reynolds, 1st Baronet =

English businessman and Conservative Party politician

Colonel Sir James Philip Reynolds, 1st Baronet, DSO (17 February 1865 – 12 December 1932) was an English businessman and Conservative Party politician.

== Early life and war service ==
Reynolds was born in Woolton, Liverpool and was educated at Ushaw College and Fort Augustus Abbey. He was a senior partner in the firm of Reynolds & Gibson, cotton brokers, of Liverpool. On 4 March 1914, he was appointed a deputy lieutenant of Lancashire. Commissioned into the 1/3rd West Lancashire Brigade, Royal Field Artillery (Territorial Force), he commanded it in the First World War and was awarded the Distinguished Service Order (DSO) in 1917.

== Political career ==
He was elected at the 1929 general election as Member of Parliament for Liverpool Exchange, following the retirement of the Conservative MP Sir Leslie Scott.

In 1931 he toured the Kruger National Park in South Africa as a guest of Deneys Reitz, in the latter's capacity as member of the Park's Board of Trustees.

He was re-elected in 1931, and died in office in 1932, aged 67.

== Honours ==
Reynolds was knighted in the 1920 New Year Honours and created a baronet, of Woolton in the County of Lancaster, on 6 March 1923. He was appointed High Sheriff of Lancashire for 1927.

Coat of arms of Sir James Reynolds, 1st Baronet
Crest A demi-moorcock displayed Proper charged on each wing with a leopard's face Or. Escutcheon Per chevron Ermine and Or in chief two lions passant Gules and in base three leopards' faces Sable. Motto Perseverando

== Footnotes ==
Parliament of the United Kingdom
Preceded by Sir Leslie Scott	Member of Parliament for Liverpool Exchange; 1929–1932	Succeeded by John Shute
Baronetage of the United Kingdom
New creation	Baronet (of Woolton); 1923–1932	Succeeded by John Reynolds
