= Henry Revell Reynolds =

English physician

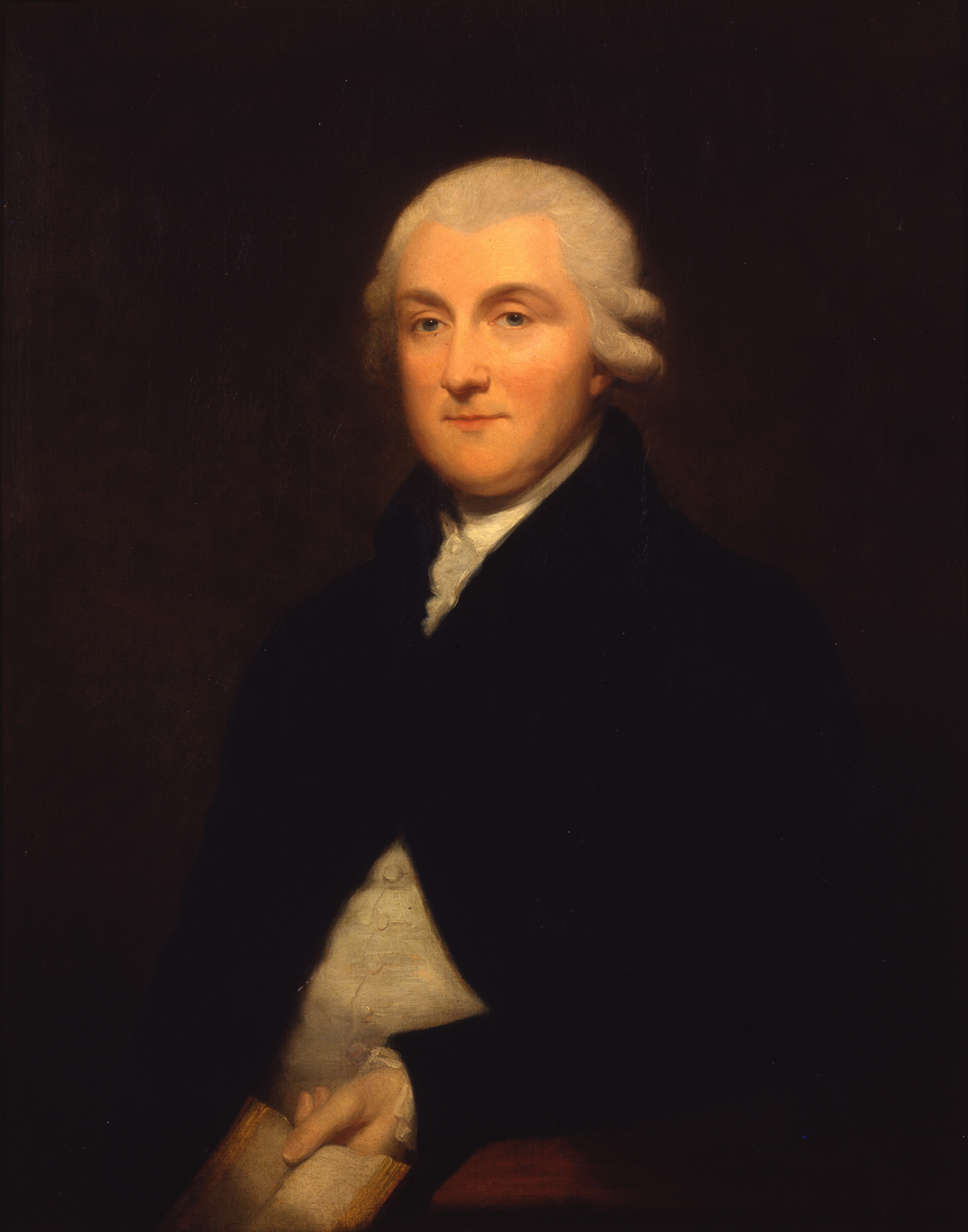
- Born: 26 September 1745; Laxton, Nottinghamshire
- Died: 22 October 1811 (aged 66); London
- Occupation: Physician

Henry Revell Reynolds (26 September 1745 – 22 October 1811) was an English physician.

== Life ==
He was born in Laxton, Nottinghamshire, the son of John Reynolds, one month after the death of his father, and was brought up by his maternal great-uncle, Henry Revell of Gainsborough, Lincolnshire. He was sent to Beverley Grammar School, and went thence on 17 March 1763 to Lincoln College, Oxford. He migrated to Trinity College, Cambridge, and, after further study at Edinburgh, graduated M.B. at Cambridge in 1768 and M.D. in 1773.

Reynolds first practised at Guildford. Richard Huck advised him to settle in London, and in the summer of 1772 he took a house in Lamb's Conduit Street. On 30 September 1773 he was admitted a candidate of the College of Physicians, and was elected a fellow on 30 September 1774. He was one of the censors of the college in 1774, 1778, 1782, 1784, 1787, and 1792; was its registrar from 1781 to 1783, Gulstonian lecturer in 1775, and Harveian orator in 1776. He did not print his oration. He was elected physician to the Middlesex Hospital on 13 July 1773, and resigned in 1777, when he was elected physician to St. Thomas's Hospital. He continued there till 1783, when his extensive private practice caused him to resign.

In 1788 he was asked to attend George III, and in 1797 was appointed physician-extraordinary, and in 1806 physician-in-ordinary. He was challenged to a duel by Dr. Richard Kentish, in November 1787, but his friends applied to a magistrate, and the Court of King's Bench intervened to restrain Kentish. The fatigues of attending upon the king at Windsor, added to an exhausting examination on the king's illness, during which he had to stand for two hours before the House of Lords, broke down his strength; but it was with difficulty that John Latham and Henry Ainslie persuaded him in May to keep to his room.

Reynolds died at his house in Bedford Square, London, on 22 October 1811 and was buried at St. James's cemetery, Hampstead Road. He was much attached to the College of Physicians, and in his own large practice was known for his great care and lucidity, and for his skill in prescribing.

== Family ==
Reynolds married Elizabeth Wilson in 1770. Their children included:

- Henry Revell Reynolds (1775–1854), a barrister. The Treasury solicitor Henry Revell Reynolds (1800–1866), maternal grandfather of Annie Rogers, was his son.
- John Reynolds (1782–1862), Congregational minister, father of John Russell Reynolds and Henry Robert Reynolds.
