= Bessie Braddock =

British Labour politician (1899–1970)

- Braddock pictured in 1967

Member of Parliament for Liverpool Exchange
- In office 5 July 1945 – 29 May 1970
- Preceded by: Sir John Shute
- Succeeded by: Robert Parry

Personal details
- Born: Elizabeth Margaret Bamber; 24 September 1899 Liverpool, England
- Died: 13 November 1970 (aged 71) Liverpool, England
- Party: Labour
- Other political affiliations: Communist (GB) (1920–24); Independent Labour (1912–1920)
- Spouse: John Braddock (m. 1922)

Elizabeth Margaret Braddock (née Bamber; 24 September 1899 – 13 November 1970) was a British Labour Party politician who served as Member of Parliament (MP) for the Liverpool Exchange division from 1945 to 1970. She was a member of Liverpool County Borough Council from 1930 to 1961. Although she never held office in government, she won a national reputation for her forthright campaigns in connection with housing, public health and other social issues.

Braddock inherited much of her campaigning spirit from her mother, Mary Bamber, an early socialist and trade union activist. After some years in the Independent Labour Party (ILP), Braddock joined the Communist Party of Great Britain (CPGB) on its foundation in 1920, but quickly became disillusioned with the party's dictatorial tendencies. She left the CPGB in 1924 and later joined the Labour Party. Before the Second World War, alongside her husband Jack Braddock she established a reputation as a crusading left-wing councillor, frequently at odds with her party while pursuing an agenda of social reform. During the war she worked in Liverpool's ambulance service, before winning the Exchange division for Labour in the 1945 general election. Braddock was a pugnacious presence in parliament, and a supporter of the 1945–51 Attlee ministry's reform agenda, particularly the establishment of the National Health Service in 1948.

She served on Labour's National Executive Committee between 1947 and 1969. Her combative style led to a brief suspension from parliament in 1952. For most of her parliamentary career she remained a member of Liverpool's council, and was a central figure in the controversy that arose in the 1950s over the city's decision to acquire and flood Capel Celyn in a valley along Afon Tryweryn in Wales for the construction of the Llyn Celyn reservoir. Between 1953 and 1957 Braddock served on the Royal Commission for Mental Health which led to the Mental Health Act 1959. From the early 1950s she moved steadily to the right wing of her party, and was increasingly acerbic in her judgements of her former colleagues on the left. When Labour won the 1964 general election she refused office on the grounds of age and health; thereafter her parliamentary contributions dwindled as her health worsened. Towards the end of her life she became Liverpool's first woman freeman. After her death in 1970 her Guardian obituarist hailed her as "one of the most distinctive political personalities of the century".

== Early life ==
=== Childhood ===
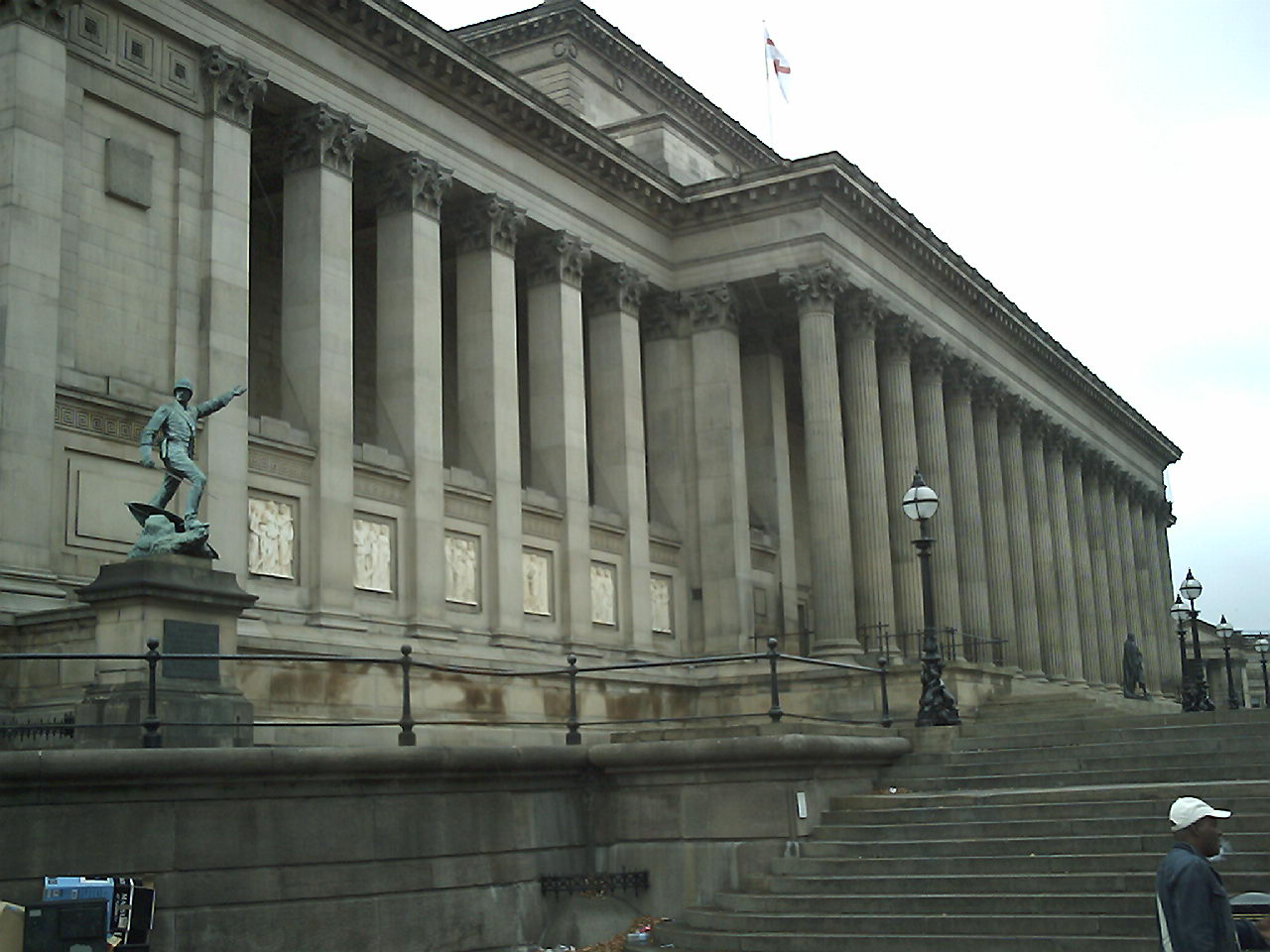
St George's Hall and Plateau, Liverpool, the site of early 20th century soup kitchens and a 1911 riot

Elizabeth Bamber was born on 24 September 1899 at 23 Zante Street, in the Everton area of Liverpool, the eldest daughter of Hugh Bamber, a bookbinder, and his wife Mary, née Little. Mary had come to Liverpool as a child when her father, a well-to-do Edinburgh lawyer, abandoned his family after his descent into alcoholism and poverty. Liverpool in the late 19th century suffered extremes of deprivation, and had the highest infant mortality rate in the country. Mary became a trade union organiser and campaigner against deplorable social conditions, and established a reputation as an outstanding platform speaker. She was the dominant early influence on her daughter Elizabeth, who formed a lifelong determination to represent and fight for the disadvantaged.

In 1902 the Bamber family relocated to Smollett Street in nearby Bootle, one of several moves that caused Elizabeth's formal education to be divided among different schools. Alongside her normal schooling, her political education began at the Marmaduke Street Socialist Sunday School, and through the medium of her mother's campaigning activities. One of Elizabeth's early memories was of the soup kitchen for the destitute which Mary helped to run on St George's Plateau: "I remember the faces of the unemployed when the soup ran out ... I remember blank, hopeless stares, day after day, week after week, all through the hard winter of 1906–07".

At the age of eleven Elizabeth left the Sunday School and joined the youth section of the Independent Labour Party (ILP), where she studied socialism alongside a busy programme of social activities. She later described herself at this time as "strong, agile, fond of walking and eating". By this time Mary Bamber was working as an organiser for the Warehouse Workers' Union; Elizabeth assisted her mother, sometimes acting as a steward at meetings. Mother and daughter were both present at St George's Plateau on 13 August 1911, when a baton charge by police and troops broke up a rally in support of Liverpool's striking transport workers. Hundreds were injured, and in the disturbances that followed, two demonstrators were shot dead. The day became enshrined in Liverpool's working-class history as "Bloody Sunday".

=== ILP years ===
Elizabeth left school in 1913, and began work filling seed packets for five shillings a week. The job was too monotonous to engage her for long, and after a few months she found a post in the drapery department of the Walton Road Co-operative store. At her mother's insistence she became a member of the Shopworkers' Union. Meanwhile, she attended classes run by the Workers' Educational Association and the Plebs' League: "They told me how the capitalists controlled money, business and the land, and ... hung on to them".

Within the group of young socialists who gathered regularly at the ILP's local headquarters, there were three Elizabeths. To avoid confusion, lots were drawn to decide who should be known respectively as Elizabeth, Betty, or Bessie. By this means Elizabeth Bamber took the name Bessie, which she retained for the rest of her life. Among the other ILP activists at Kensington was Sydney Silverman, four years older than Bessie, the son of a poor draper. Silverman was a considerable influence on the youthful Bessie; he would be her future colleague, both in the Liverpool council chamber and the House of Commons. When the First World War began in August 1914, the ILP opposed it as "an appalling crime upon the nations" who had been "stampeded by fear and panic". On the introduction of conscription in 1916, Silverman and others adopted positions of uncompromising pacifism, and were imprisoned. The ILP welcomed news of the Russian Revolution of 1917, and vigorously opposed allied intervention in the civil war that followed it. Bessie played a leading role in a TUC "Hands Off Russia" rally in Liverpool's Sheil Park, where she and others resisted the efforts of the British Empire Union to capture the ILP's red flag.

At the end of the war in 1918, Bessie left the Co-op and took a clerical post with the Warehouse Workers' Union. In the course of her ILP activities she had met and befriended John "Jack" Braddock, a wagon builder and union activist with a reputation as a firebrand. He had arrived in Liverpool from Dewsbury in 1915, hoping to emigrate to Canada, but had stayed in the port and immersed himself in left-wing politics and the fight to improve working conditions. He and Bessie became very close; in 1919 they helped Mary Bamber to fight for a Liverpool council seat, as the ILP's candidate in the Everton district. The election campaign was bitter and at times violent, but resulted in Bamber's victory by the slim margin of 13 votes.

== Early politics ==
=== Communist activist ===
By 1920 Mary Bamber, Bessie and Jack Braddock had become disillusioned with the ILP, which seemed to them to lack the necessary radicalism to march with the times. At the time, Sylvia Pankhurst's Workers' Socialist Federation, the British Socialist Party and other socialist organisations were increasingly coordinating their activities, and in 1920 merged to form the Communist Party of Great Britain (CPGB). Under Mary Bamber's influence, both Bessie and Jack Braddock left the ILP to become members of the new party. Within the CPGB the young couple became acquainted with Wal Hannington, leader of the National Unemployed Workers Committee Movement. They joined his "work or maintenance" campaign which aimed to raise the levels of Poor Law relief to what they considered a proper subsistence level. The couple did not endear themselves to the CPGB hierarchy when, on egalitarian grounds, they opposed the levels of salary which the party wanted to pay to its full-time officials.

In the joint autobiography written with Jack, The Braddocks (1963), Bessie cites the formative experience of police violence on "Bloody Sunday" in 1911 as a motivating factor for her CPGB activities. On 12 September 1921, again at St George's Plateau, she attended a rally for the city's jobless, organised by the Liverpool Unemployed Workers' Committee. Again there was police intervention; Jack and Mary Bamber were charged with unlawful assembly and received a token one day's imprisonment. In 1922 Bessie and other party members provided comfort and shelter to Hannington's hunger marchers, as the columns of unemployed passed through Lancashire on their way to London. Bessie combined her party roles—she was treasurer of the Liverpool branch—with her full-time union post; Jack, meanwhile, was only intermittently in work, as his incendiary reputation meant that employers were reluctant to give him a job. He had been living for some time at the Bambers' home when, in February 1922, the couple were married at Brougham Terrace registry office, during the course of a working day. After a brief reception they returned to their respective duties—Bessie to her union job and Jack to his volunteer work for the CPGB.

The Braddocks were not comfortable as CPGB members. They objected to the lack of autonomy afforded to local branches by the party's central "Political Bureau", and to what they perceived as the leadership's unquestioning subservience to the Soviet Union. Mary Bamber, after a visit to Russia, opined that there were as many true communists in Liverpool as in Moscow. In 1924, increasingly convinced that communist rule would lead to the enslavement rather than the liberation of workers, the entire leadership of the Liverpool CPGB branch, including both Braddocks, resigned from the party.

=== Liverpool council ===
After leaving the CPGB, the Braddocks continued their socialist activism in Liverpool. Jack's role in the Merseyside Council of Action (an impromptu militant action group) during the 1926 General Strike made employers even less willing to engage him. He was rescued by the action of Sir Benjamin Johnson, a liberal-minded industrialist, who lent him the money to purchase a Co-operative Insurance Society agency. Jack and Bessie were now determined to pursue their political aims by democratic methods, and in 1926 they joined the Fairfield ward of the Liverpool Labour Party. (Note: Until 1918, membership of the Labour Party was only through one of the affiliated organisations, e.g. the ILP, the Fabian Society, trade unions, etc. The 1918 constitution provided for direct membership of the Labour Party, via local constituency parties. The ILP continued as an affiliated body, with its own membership, but was greatly weakened.) In the 1929 Liverpool council elections, Jack was returned unopposed as the Labour councillor for the Fairfield ward. A year later Bessie joined him, elected in the St Anne's ward.

St Anne's, one of the most deprived areas of the city, contained a closed workhouse at Brownlow Hill, which the Conservative-controlled council had decided to sell to the Roman Catholic Church as the potential site for a cathedral. The Labour group's official policy was to delay the sale for several years, so that the empty workhouse buildings could be used as temporary housing during slum clearance and rebuilding. The issue split Labour on religious lines; nearly all the Catholic members of the Labour group defied party policy and voted for an immediate sale. Among the rebels was the sitting St Anne's councillor, Olive Hughes. She was thereupon deselected by the St Anne's ward, which chose Bessie as their candidate for the 1930 election. Bessie faced a difficult task, since Hughes chose to stand against her as an Independent Socialist, with the support of leading local Catholics in a ward where the electorate was 85 per cent Catholic. An intense campaign, during which Bessie claimed to have visited every street in the ward, brought her success.

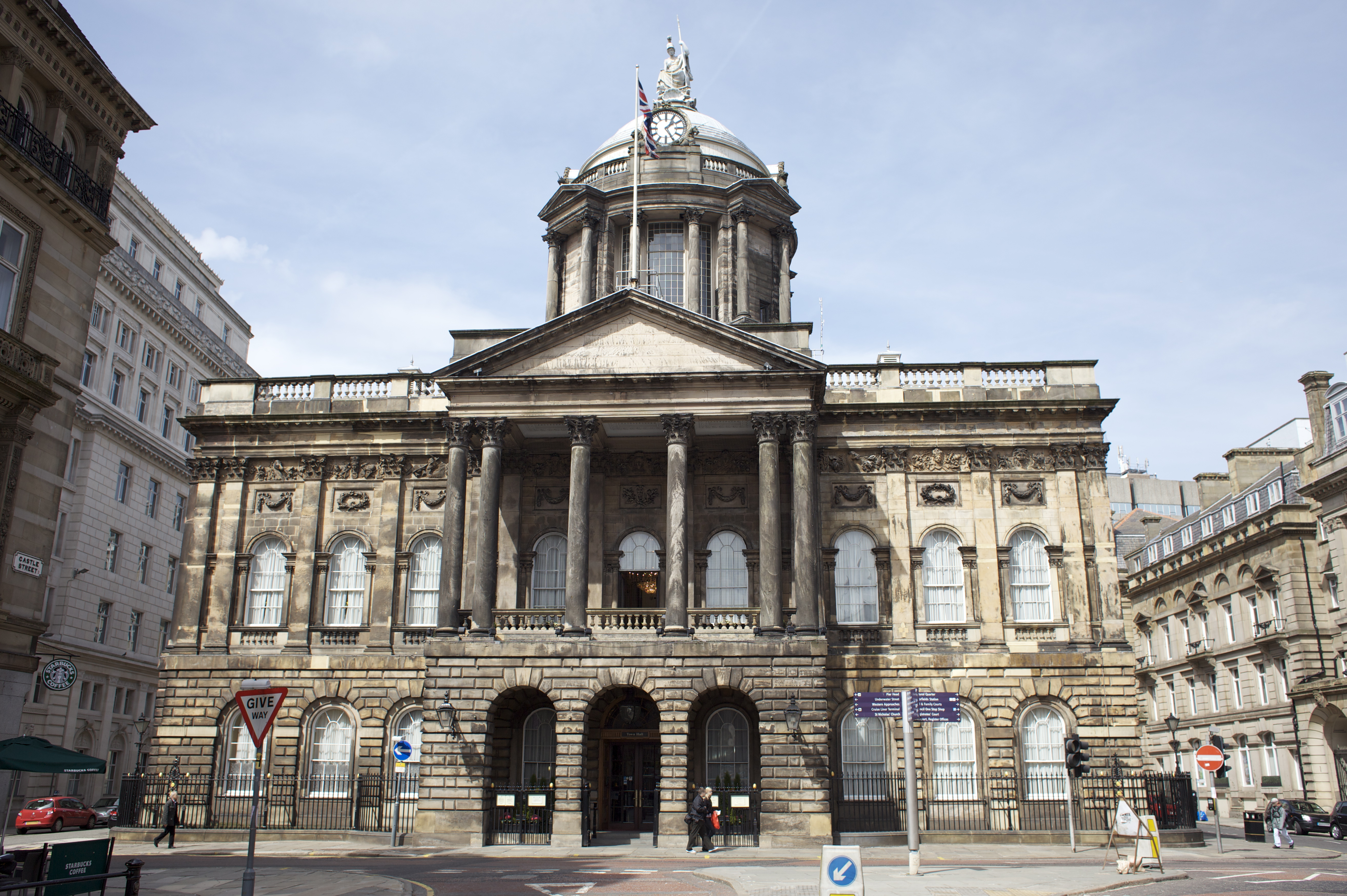
Liverpool Town Hall

This victory did not delay the workhouse's fate; the site was duly sold to the Catholic Church for £110,000, and demolition began in January 1931. Nevertheless, Bessie, who had been appalled by the housing conditions in the ward, helped to instigate a slum clearance campaign which slowly brought improvements. As a member of the council's Port Sanitary and Hospitals Committee, which controlled all the city's hospitals and residential homes for the elderly, Bessie discovered that the hospitals were generally verminous, drably decorated and poorly ventilated, with inadequate cooking facilities. Patients' record-keeping systems were rudimentary, with little or no communication between hospitals. She became involved in the reform, reorganisation and modernisation of many of the city's health facilities, particularly those related to mothers and children. From 1934 she was chairman of the Maternity and Child Welfare subcommittee, and in June 1936 worked with other women's groups to organise a national conference on maternity and child welfare issues.

The Labour group on the council remained divided. The group's leader was Luke Hogan (1885–1954), of Irish stock and closely identified with the Catholic caucus. He enjoyed the strong support of around two-thirds of the Labour councillors; the Braddocks, and from 1932 Sydney Silverman, were part of the smaller leftist wing of the group. Clashes between the two sides were frequent, the main contention being the supposed attempts by Hogan and his followers to "catholicise" the local party. When in 1936 Hogan tried to block the renewal of a grant to a local birth control clinic, Bessie led a cross-party rebellion of councillors which ensured that the grant was maintained. She argued that most of the 87 women who had died in childbirth the previous year might have survived with access to contraception.

Mostly, Bessie was uncompromising in her attitude towards the council's ruling Conservatives; on one occasion she was ejected from the council chamber by the police, after she had called the Housing Committee chairman a liar and refused the mayor's order to withdraw the remark. She justified this behaviour on the grounds that "if you didn't do something outrageous, nobody would take any notice of you". She had earlier resorted to using a two-foot megaphone in a council meeting, to demand action over housing conditions and slums.

"We had to have change. The conditions of the workers had to be improved. The bosses had to be forced to give up some of their enormous profits. The only way to achieve this was by fighting, and we fought all the time".

— Bessie Braddock: The Braddocks, p. 74.

Inspired by her colleague Silverman, who in the 1935 general election became MP for Nelson and Colne, Bessie determined to seek a parliamentary career of her own. This ambition contrasted with that of Jack, who turned down the chance to be Labour's candidate in the Everton constituency to concentrate on his local government role. In 1936 Bessie was selected as Labour candidate for Liverpool Exchange. This inner-city division had long been held by the Conservatives, mainly because of a substantial "business vote" which, before the abolition of plural voting in 1948, gave owners of businesses an extra vote in the constituency where their business operated. In the recent election the seat had been held by the Conservative, Sir John Shute, with a majority of 4,412. Bessie was then 36 years old; she would have to wait for nearly 10 years before she could fight her seat, as the general election that would normally have been held in 1939 or 1940 was postponed by the Second World War.

In the years immediately before the war Bessie was concerned at the extent of recruitment in the city by the British Union of Fascists. She was outspoken in her attacks on fascist groups, and in her defence of those who attacked their parades. The death of her mother Mary Bamber in June 1938, at the age of 63, was a considerable personal blow to Bessie, and was widely mourned within Liverpool's socialist community.

=== Second World War ===
On the outbreak of war in September 1939, Bessie left her union post and joined G Division of the Liverpool Ambulance Service, as a driver. Initially her main job was to train other drivers, mostly young women. She became a section leader and then a deputy leader of G Division, an administrative post that should have kept her at headquarters. However, she records that she drove her ambulance through all the 68 major air raids that struck Liverpool during the war years. It was dangerous work; on a single day, 3 May 1941, 14 drivers lost their lives. Bessie remained with the ambulance service almost until the end of the war in 1945.

In 1942 Bessie and Jack moved to what would be their home for the remainder of their lives, a suburban semi-detached house in ZigZag Road, in Liverpool's West Derby district. They remained active members of Liverpool council, and in 1943 Jack became deputy leader of the Labour group. Two years later the Braddocks healed the rift with Hogan by proposing and seconding his appointment as the city's Lord Mayor for the year 1945–46; Jack succeeded him as leader of the Labour group on the council, a post he held until his death in 1963. Bessie became honorary president of the Liverpool Trades Council and Labour Party (LTCLP), the body that had been formed in 1921 when the Liverpool Trades Council merged with the newly formed local Labour Party to form a united labour front. (Note: The two components remained united, despite considerable tension, until 1969, when they separated into a Trades Council and a District Labour Party.)

== Labour MP ==
=== Labour government 1945–51 ===
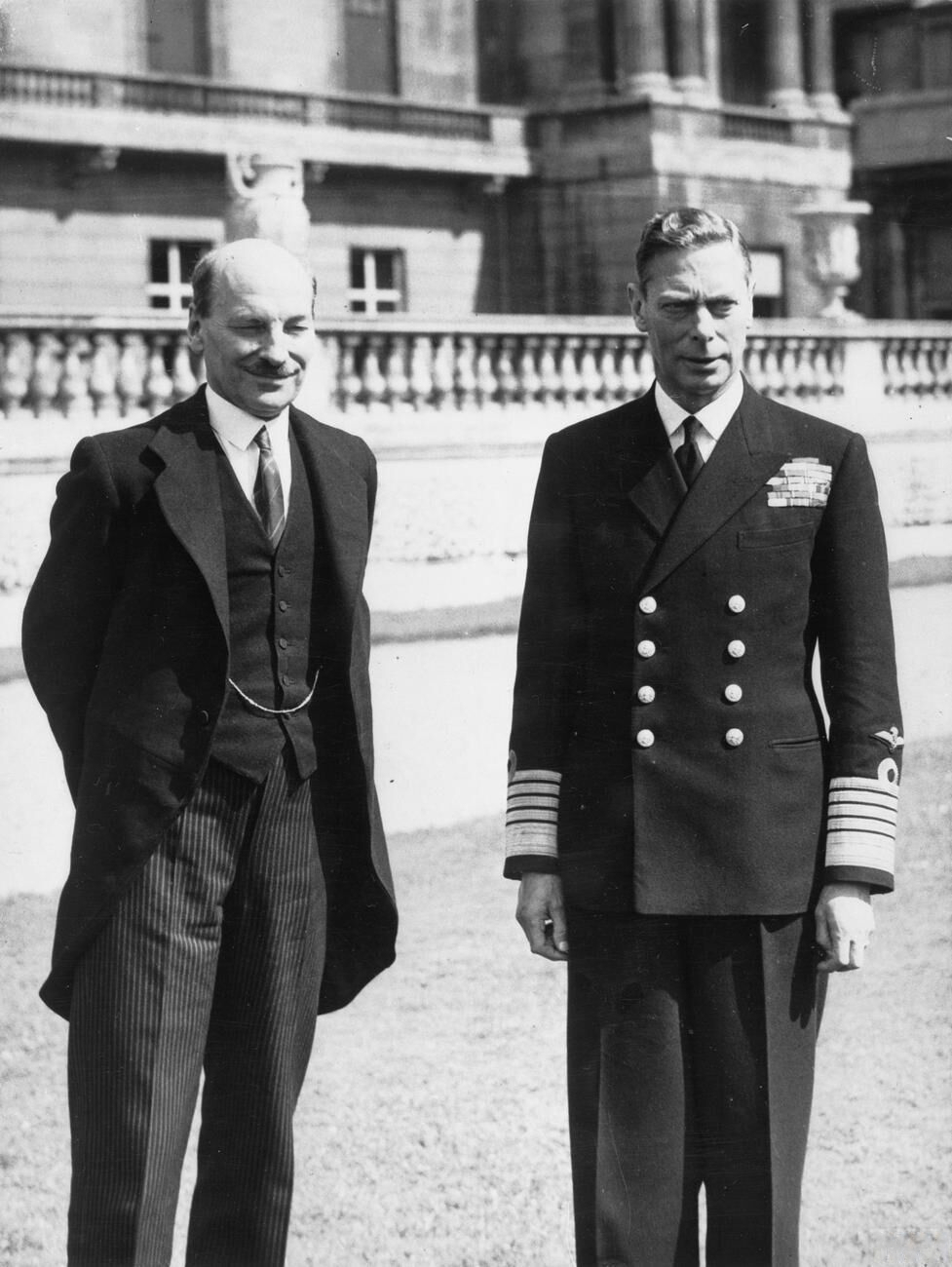
The new Labour prime minister, Clement Attlee, with King George VI in 1945

Despite some opinion polls indicating a Labour lead, most commentators expected that Winston Churchill's prestige would ensure a comfortable Conservative victory in the July 1945 general election. Before polling day, The Manchester Guardian surmised that "the chances of Labour sweeping the country and obtaining a clear majority ... are pretty remote". The News of the World predicted a working Conservative majority, while in Glasgow a pundit forecast the result as Conservatives 360, Labour 220, Others 60. The expectations of a Labour victory in Liverpool Exchange were not high, but Bessie's chances were boosted by the poor local record of the sitting member, Colonel Shute, and she herself was confident. Defying most forecasts, across the country Labour won 393 seats, and with an overall majority of 146, Clement Attlee formed the first majority Labour government. Bessie won Liverpool Exchange with a majority of 665 from 16,000 votes cast.

In an assessment of the new MPs, the Daily Express described Bessie as "a character among the Labour women. Very forthright in her speech, strong in her Labour faith ... never hesitates to call a spade a spade". Physically imposing—she admitted to weighing 15 stone (210 pounds, 95 kg)—she made an impact with her maiden speech on 17 October 1945, during a debate on the national housing shortage. After taunting the Conservative opposition by claiming to have "filched" the Exchange seat—"the prize Division of the [Liverpool] Tory Party"—she made an impassioned plea to the new Minister of Health, Aneurin Bevan, for immediate measures to improve the slum housing conditions in Liverpool, and throughout the country: "Particularly in industrial areas, people are living in flea-ridden, bug-ridden, rat-ridden, lousy hell-holes". She ended her speech with a promise that she and other Labour back-benchers would continue to agitate until the conditions in which many were forced to live, "as a result of having been represented for so long by the Conservative Party", were removed.

Bessie's aggressive anti-Toryism was frequently in evidence during her first years in parliament, especially when she could attribute to them the economic miseries of her Liverpool constituents. In a Commons debate on 28 March 1946 she welcomed the government's decision to close the Liverpool Cotton Association, which she denounced as "the bulwark of the Tory administration in Liverpool", nothing more than a group of financiers who gambled with the industry in order to make profits for themselves. On 1 May 1947 The Manchester Guardian, reporting the chaotic Commons scenes during the divisions following a debate on the nationalisation of the railways, recorded that "Mrs E.M. Braddock ... danced a jig as she moved over to the Opposition benches where she occupied the seat usually used by Mr Churchill." When the Bolton Evening News called her performance "nauseating, a sorry degradation of democratic discussion" she sued the newspaper for defamation. She lost the case, and a subsequent appeal was unsuccessful.

In 1947 Bessie was elected to the Labour Party's National Executive Committee (NEC). At the time she was generally identified with the left wing of the party, and was associated with a grouping known as the "Socialist Fellowship", which espoused a programme of colonial freedom, workers' control and reduced arms expenditure. She resigned from the Fellowship in 1950, along with fellow-MPs Fenner Brockway and Ellis Smith, when it condemned the United Nations intervention in the Korean War. She continued her wholehearted campaigning on behalf of the poorest in the country, pleading with parliament to "remember the queues outside the Poor Relief offices", and castigating the "New Look" fashion of 1948 as wasteful, "the ridiculous whim of idle people". Bessie's fiery reputation did not harm her electorally; in the February 1950 general election, with the Exchange constituency greatly increased by boundary changes, her majority rose to 5,344. Nationally, Labour lost 76 seats, and its parliamentary majority was reduced to five. Attlee's second government was short-lived; in the October 1951 general election Bessie increased her personal majority again, to 6,834, but nationally Labour was defeated by the Conservatives and went into opposition.

Outside her political duties Bessie, a fan of boxing, accepted the honorary presidency of the Professional Boxers' Association, and was a defender of the sport. Her enthusiasm arose in part from her experiences as a juvenile court magistrate; she believed that the sport fostered character and mutual respect. She was frequently at odds with her parliamentary colleague Edith Summerskill, a physician who wrote the anti-boxing tract The Ignoble Art, and campaigned for the sport's abolition.

=== 1950s: Rightward shift ===
After leaving Socialist Fellowship, Bessie moved steadily towards the centre and right of her party, distancing herself from colleagues with whom she had earlier found common cause. She did not support Aneurin Bevan when he resigned from the government in April 1951 over the introduction of National Health Service charges, and later asserted that, by making dissidence fashionable, Bevan had "weakened the [Labour] National Executive to the point where it could no longer deal effectively with infiltrating Trotskyists and Communists". In 1955 her opposition to the Bevanite faction was such that she supported efforts by Hugh Gaitskell and Herbert Morrison to have Bevan expelled from the party. She regularly attacked the Labour left at party conferences, and in 1952 was involved in scuffles with other delegates after the unexpected success of Bevanite candidates in the NEC elections.

Also in 1952, Bessie's volatile temperament caused her to become the first woman member to be suspended from the House of Commons, after she repeatedly protested to the Deputy Speaker for failing to call her during a debate on the textile industry, a matter of great concern to her constituents. In general, however, her forthright attitude won her cross-party respect, and in 1953 she was appointed by Churchill (who had returned as prime minister in 1951) to the Royal Commission on Mental Health, otherwise known as the Percy Commission, whose work led to the Mental Health Act 1959.

Bessie's increasingly centrist stance troubled party members in Liverpool Exchange, where the Bevanite faction was generally popular. In 1954 the local party passed a motion requesting that she step down before the next general election. This was rejected by the NEC, who believed that Bessie was a national electoral asset. Shortly before the May 1955 general election the Exchange party tried again, and voted by 40 to 39 to deselect her. Bessie, convinced that this vote had been rigged, appealed to the NEC, who set the decision aside and imposed her on the constituency. These party machinations had no effect on Bessie's popularity with the voters; in the election on 26 May, despite the intervention of a left-wing Independent Socialist candidate, she increased her majority to 7,186. Nevertheless, nationally the Conservatives retained power with an increased parliamentary majority. In the municipal elections held that same month, Labour won control of Liverpool's council for the first time; Jack Braddock became council leader. Bessie gave up her St Anne's ward seat, after 25 years, but remained on the council as a co-opted alderman.

=== Campaigns and controversies, 1956–59 ===
In May 1956 Bessie's concerns about the treatment of prisoners in Walton Prison led to an investigation by Sir Godfrey Russell Vick, which revealed numerous instances of violence by members of the prison staff, and brought about reforms. In July that year, during a home affairs debate, Bessie demanded tougher regulations on the supply and licensing of air pistols, which under the existing law were readily available to juveniles. She alarmed the house by brandishing two such pistols which, she explained, she had confiscated in the course of her duties as a juvenile court magistrate. When rebuked by the Deputy Speaker, she replied that she had deliberately used shock tactics, reprising her earlier council chamber argument that "no one takes any notice unless someone does something which is out of order, or is unusual". She also campaigned for the rights of larger women to obtain fashionable clothes; using her substantial 50" – 40" – 50" measurements to advantage, she took part in a fashion show aimed at the larger-than-average woman.

In 1956, as part of a Liverpool council delegation, the Braddocks visited the Soviet Union at the invitation of the mayor of Odessa, a city with which Liverpool had informal fraternal links. Her overall impression of the country was of drabness and oppression, with welfare provision generally well below British levels, although she conceded that medical facilities were excellent. Before returning home she informed the mayor of Odessa that "after forty years of socialism ... you haven't achieved half of what we have in Britain".

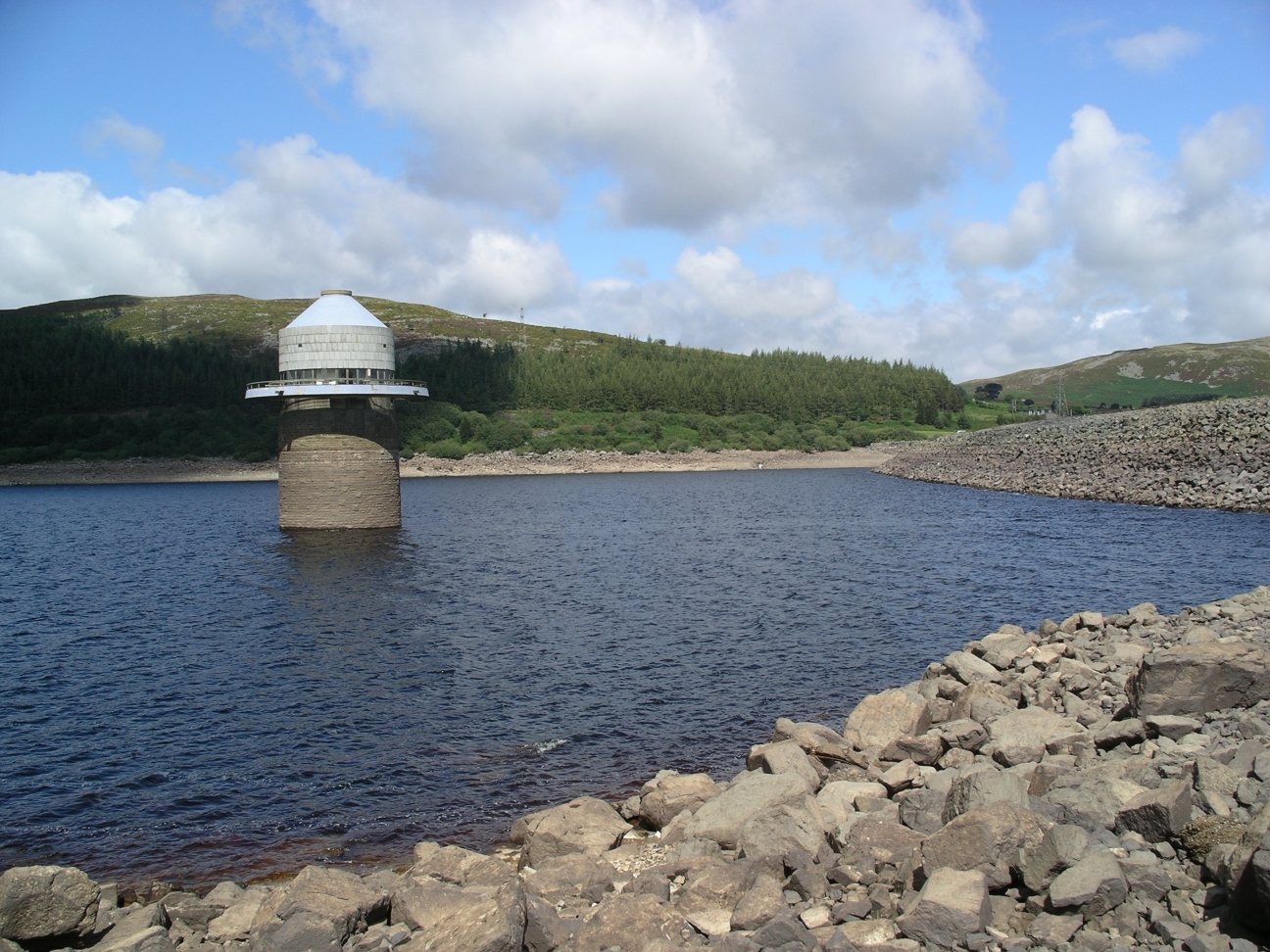
The Tryweryn reservoir, controversially built between 1957 and 1965

In the later 1950s an issue arose which tarnished the reputation of Braddock both in the eyes of much of Liverpool's Welsh community and the people of Wales. In 1955 Liverpool council applied for the compulsory purchase of land in the Tryweryn Valley, Merionethshire, North Wales, for the construction of a reservoir to serve Liverpool's increasing needs for water—some 65 million gallons a day. The proposal would mean the flooding of the small village of Capel Celyn, and several farms. On 7 November a deputation led by the Plaid Cymru president Gwynfor Evans sought to address the council in a plea for a change in policy. According to Bessie's biographer Ben Rees, while Evans was speaking, Bessie banged on the table and joined other councillors in insulting Evans and demanding that he "go back to Wales". In July 1957, when the enabling legislation reached its second House of Commons reading, Bessie described the scheme as regional rather than local, and claimed that some parts of Wales would benefit from it. The land to be flooded in the Tryweryn Valley was not, she said, of high agricultural value, and "nothing was done that was not agreed to by the tenants in the area". The bill became law, and construction began in 1959, but protests and demonstrations continued until the reservoir's opening in 1965. The slogan Cofiwch Dryweryn ("Remember Tryweryn") was coined by nationalists, says Rees, as "a reminder of Liverpool's greed and lack of sensitivity". In October 2015, on the 50th anniversary of the reservoir's completion, protestors demonstrated around the statue of Bessie at Liverpool Lime Street station.

In the October 1959 general election the Conservatives, now led by Harold Macmillan, increased their majority in parliament to 100 seats. In Liverpool Exchange Bessie defied the national swing, and increased her proportion of the vote. On a reduced turnout her personal majority fell slightly, to 6,971.

=== Later career, 1960–68 ===
In 1961 Bessie's aldermanic term on Liverpool's council expired. That year, the Conservatives briefly took control of the council, and used their majority to block her reappointment. This ended 31 years' service on the council. In 1963, when Labour regained control, she did not seek re-instatement. The year 1963 saw the publication of The Braddocks, in which Bessie made a sustained attack on communism and Trotskyism: "The purpose of this book is to bring home to the rank and file how wide that influence is ... unless positive steps are taken by the workers themselves ... democracy will be dead". Reviewing the book for the Socialist Standard, Lawrence Weidberg thought it gave a useful picture of early 20th century working-class life in Liverpool, but concluded that "from the evidence of this book the Braddocks qualified fully for the role of blind leaders of the blind".

On 12 November 1963 Jack Braddock died of a heart attack at the age of 71, while attending an official function in Liverpool. The October 1964 general election brought Labour a narrow victory under Harold Wilson, while in Liverpool Exchange, Bessie achieved her best personal majority to date, 9,746. She did not take a post in the new government; according to The Guardian she was offered a job, but declined on the grounds of health and age. Although she fought the next election, in March 1966, and held Liverpool Exchange easily, for the final six years of her parliamentary life she was relatively inactive and often absent through illness. Her last contribution in the House was on 27 January 1969, a question regarding facilities for disabled drivers.

== Final years and death ==
In 1968 Bessie became vice chairman (and therefore chairman-elect) of the Labour Party. However, in February 1969 she collapsed with exhaustion and was hospitalised. In August she resigned from the NEC on health grounds, thus forgoing her succession to the party chairmanship. In September she announced that she did not intend to contest the next general election, and would retire from politics, a decision which shocked and disappointed her constituents. In April 1970 she was awarded the freedom of the City of Liverpool, the first woman thus honoured. Bessie formally left parliament at the dissolution before the June 1970 general election; on 13 November 1970 she died in Liverpool's Rathbone Hospital, at the age of 71. At her funeral service held a few days later at Anfield Crematorium, in the course of his tribute, Harold Wilson summed her up thus: "She was born to fight for the people of the docks, of the slums, of the factories and in every part of the city where people needed help". The service was non-sectarian in accordance with her atheism.

== Appraisal ==
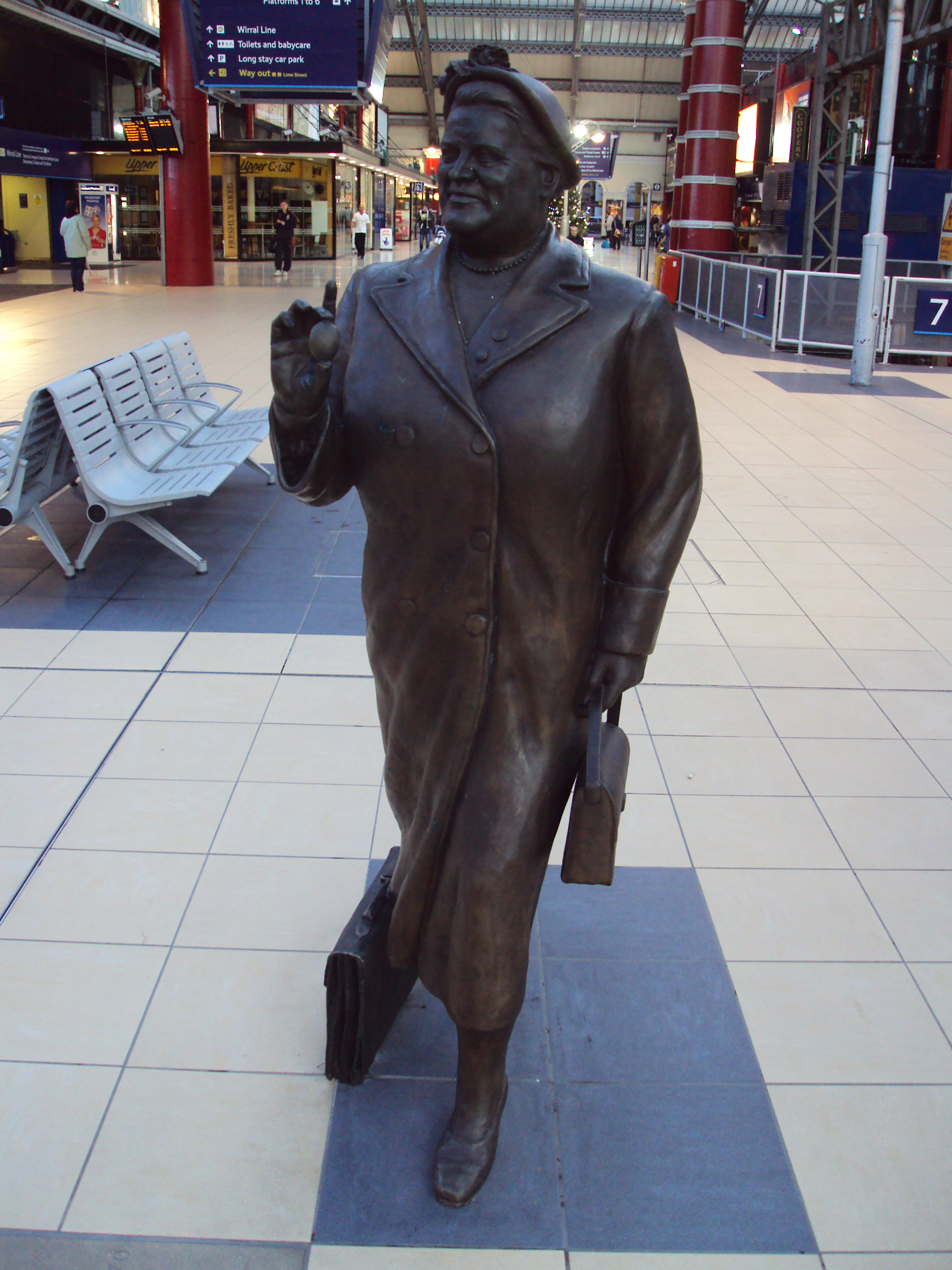
Statue of Bessie Braddock at Lime Street Station

At the time of her death, commentators described Bessie as one of the most notable political personalities of her time, and perhaps the best-known woman in Britain after Queen Elizabeth II. She was especially appreciated in Liverpool, where much of her campaigning zeal for better housing and healthcare was concentrated. Widely known and remembered as "Battling Bessie", thirty years after her death she was placed eighth in a BBC poll of "great Merseysiders".

Bessie was renowned for the sharpness of her tongue, either in pursuit of her campaigns or in denouncing her enemies. She frequently used inflammatory, colourful language, once describing an opposing councillor as a "blasted rat", and another time telling the Tory majority that she was willing "to take a machine gun to the lot of you". In contrast to this aggressive public, Bessie's private life was unostentatious. She did not smoke or drink, dressed conventionally and holidayed modestly in Scarborough. Nevertheless, she enjoyed the company of many glamorous friends from the worlds of show business and boxing.

Towards perceived adversaries, Bessie showed neither patience nor respect, especially those with whom she had once shared common ground on the far left. Apart from her attacks on Bevan, she displayed particular scorn for the future Labour Party leader Michael Foot, whose practice in the 1950s of writing articles attacking the Labour leadership for right-wing newspapers was, she thought, disloyal. A much reported exchange between her and Churchill has her accusing him of being "drunk, and what's more [...] disgustingly drunk", and him rejoining: "My dear, you are ugly, and what's more, you are disgustingly ugly. But tomorrow I shall be sober and you will still be disgustingly ugly."

In 1984, Radio City, an independent Liverpool radio station, broadcast a four-part dramatisation of Jack and Bessie Braddock's lives. Bessie Braddock is commemorated in Liverpool by the statue in Lime Street Station, and by a blue plaque erected at her modest home in ZigZag Road, which was unveiled by Betty Boothroyd. In a 2014 Fabian Society essay the Labour MP Lisa Nandy wrote that Bessie "brought her experiences of life in the slums of Liverpool right into the heart of Westminster. Now, more than ever, we need the voices of working women to be heard in parliament".

== Notes ==
Parliament of the United Kingdom
| Preceded by John Shute | Member of Parliament for Liverpool Exchange; 1945–1970 | Succeeded by Robert Parry |
