= Reynolds baronets =

Baronetcy in the Baronetage of the United Kingdom

There have been two baronetcies created for persons with the surname Reynolds, both in the Baronetage of the United Kingdom. One creation is extant as of 2007.

The Reynolds Baronetcy, of Grosvenor Street, was created in the Baronetage of the United Kingdom on 28 February 1895 for the prominent physician and neurologist John Russell Reynolds. The title became extinct on his death the following year.

The Reynolds Baronetcy, of Woolton in the County of Lancaster, was created in the Baronetage of the United Kingdom on 6 March 1923 for the businessman and Unionist politician James Reynolds. The second Baronet was Chairman of Combined English Mills (spinners) Ltd.

== Reynolds baronets, of Grosvenor Street (1895) ==
- Sir John Russell Reynolds, 1st Baronet (1828–1896)

== Reynolds baronets, of Woolton (1923) ==
- Sir James Philip Reynolds, 1st Baronet (1865–1932)
- Sir John Francis Roskell Reynolds, 2nd Baronet (1899–1956)
- Sir David James Reynolds, 3rd Baronet (1924-2015)
- Sir James Francis Reynolds, 4th Baronet (born 1971)

The heir presumptive is the present holder's cousin Simon Anthony Reynolds (born 1939). The heir presumptive's heir apparent is his son Stefan Damian Reynolds (born 1970).

Coat of arms of the Reynolds baronets of Woolton
Crest A demi-moorcock displayed Proper charged on each wing with a leopard's face Or. Escutcheon Per chevron Ermine and Or in chief two lions passant Gules and in base three leopards' faces Sable. Motto Perseverando
