= 1933 Liverpool Exchange by-election =

UK parliamentary by-election

The 1933 Liverpool Exchange by-election was a by-election held for the British House of Commons constituency of Liverpool Exchange in Liverpool on 19 January 1933. It was won by the Conservative Party candidate John Shute.

== Vacancy ==
The seat had become vacant on 12 December 1932 when the Conservative Member of Parliament (MP), Sir James Reynolds died at the age of 67. He had held the seat since the 1929 general election.

== Candidates ==
The Conservative candidate was 60-year-old John Shute, who had not previously contested a parliamentary election. The Labour Party selected Sydney Silverman, a 37-year-old solicitor who had been imprisoned as a conscientious objector during World War I. The Liberal Party had not contested the seat for many years and did not field a candidate in the by-election.

== Result and previous result ==
On a reduced turnout, the result was a victory for the Conservative candidate, John Shute, with 55% of the votes, a majority significantly below that of his predecessor in 1931. He held the seat until defeat at the 1945 general election.

Silverman was elected in 1935 as MP for Nelson and Colne.

Election	Political result	Candidate	Party	Votes	%	±%
By-election, January 1933 death of Reynolds; Electorate: 50,060; Turnout: 27,610 (55.2%) −13.8	Conservative hold Majority: 2,786 (10.0%) −26.6; Swing: 13.8% from Con to Lab	John Shute	Conservative	15,198	55.0	−13.8
By-election, January 1933 death of Reynolds; Electorate: 50,060; Turnout: 27,610 (55.2%) −13.8	Conservative hold Majority: 2,786 (10.0%) −26.6; Swing: 13.8% from Con to Lab	Sydney Silverman	Labour	12,412	45.0	+13.8
General election, October 1931; Electorate: 50,638; Turnout: 69.0% (+3.1)	Conservative hold Majority: 13,144 (37.6%) +37.0; Swing: 18.5% from Lab to Con	James Reynolds	Conservative	24,008	68.8	+18.5
General election, October 1931; Electorate: 50,638; Turnout: 69.0% (+3.1)	Conservative hold Majority: 13,144 (37.6%) +37.0; Swing: 18.5% from Lab to Con	T. McLean	Labour	10,894	31.2	−18.5

== See also ==
- Liverpool Exchange (UK Parliament constituency)
- 1887 Liverpool Exchange by-election
- 1897 Liverpool Exchange by-election
- 1922 Liverpool Exchange by-election
- Liverpool
- List of United Kingdom by-elections
