= David Duncan (politician) =

British politician (1831-1886)

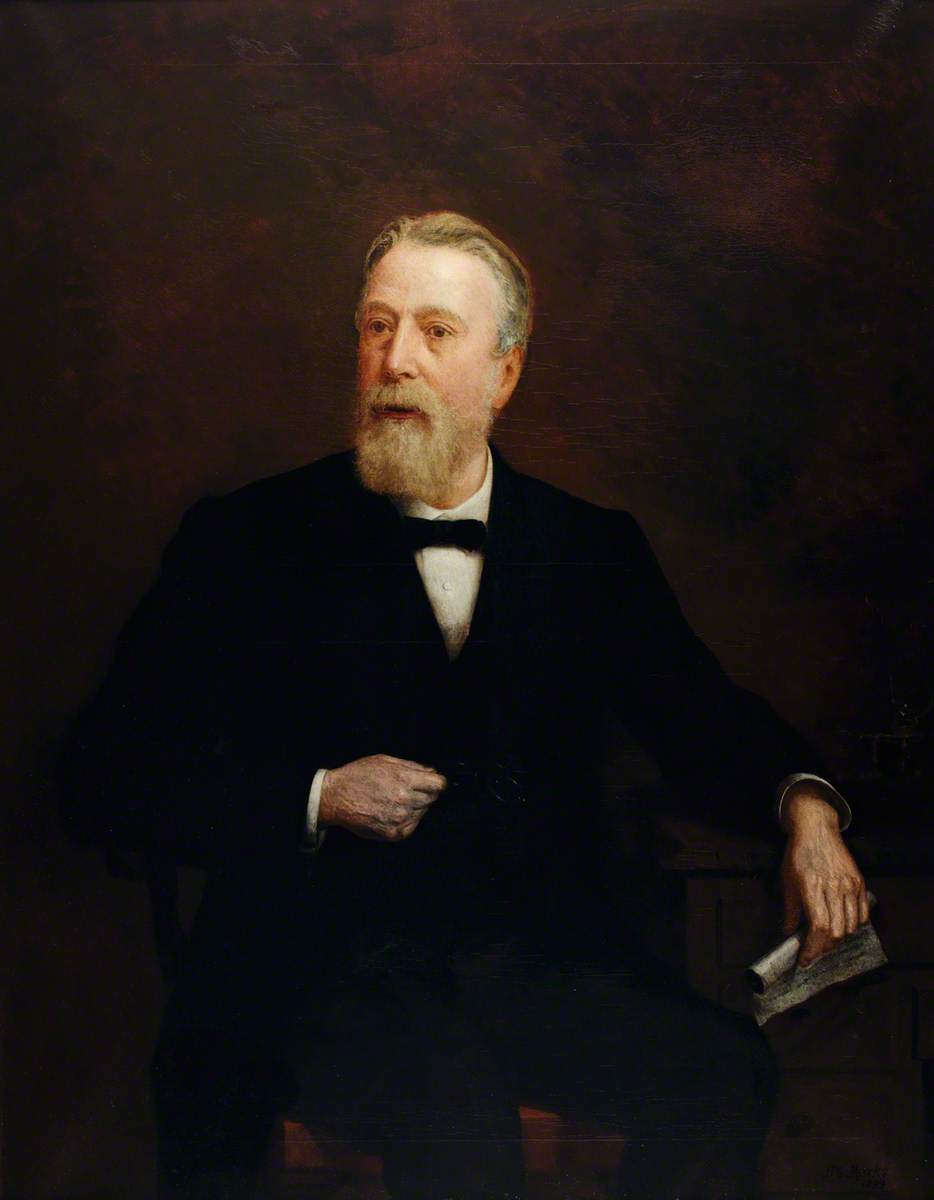
- David Duncan
- Born: 1831
- Died: December 1886 (aged 54–55)
- Occupation: Politician

David Duncan (1831 – 30 December 1886) was a British merchant and shipper and a Liberal Party politician who briefly represented the seat of Barrow-in-Furness.

Duncan was born at Alyth, Perthshire, the fourth son of James Duncan, a manufacturer and merchant, and was educated at the High School of Dundee. He and his elder brother James went to South America where they became very successful traders. In 1851 he went into partnership with Alexander Balfour and Stephen Williamson in the shipping business of Balfour Williamson. He and Williamson were based in Valparaíso while Balfour looked after the Liverpool end of the business.

After the partnership ran into personal difficulties, Duncan left Balfour Williamson in 1863, and formed his own company, Duncan Fox & Co., which became a great commercial rival of Balfour Williamson in Chile, with interests in mining as well as shipping. He returned to England and lived at Gayton Hall in Cheshire where he was a J. P. and was also a director of the Royal Insurance Company.

In 1885 he was elected as a Member of Parliament for Barrow-in-Furness, but was unseated on petition. He was then elected to represent Liverpool Exchange which he held until his death later that year.

In 1856 Duncan married Catherine Williamson of Anstruther, sister of Stephen Williamson. Their eldest son James was born in Valparaíso. James was also briefly MP for Barrow-in-Furness. His grandson by another son, Sir James Duncan, was also an MP and became a baronet.

Parliament of the United Kingdom
New constituency	Member of Parliament for Barrow-in-Furness; 1885 – 1886	Succeeded by William Sproston Caine
Preceded by Laurence Richardson Baily	Member of Parliament for Liverpool Exchange; 1886 – 1887	Succeeded by Ralph Neville
