= Leslie Scott (British politician) =

British politician

Sir Leslie Frederic Scott (28 October 1869 – 19 May 1950) was a Conservative Party politician in the United Kingdom, and later a senior judge.

Born in 1869, he was the son of Sir John Scott, the Judicial Advisor to the Khedive of Egypt, and Edgeworth Leonora Hill. Scott was educated at Rugby School and at New College, Oxford. He was called to the bar in 1894 and took silk in 1909 as a member of both the Middle Temple and the Inner Temple. He remained a member for the rest of his career.

He was elected as Member of Parliament (MP) for Liverpool Exchange at the December 1910 general election, and held the seat until he retired from Parliament at the 1929 general election.

Scott was Solicitor General for six months in 1922, until fall of the Lloyd George-led coalition government, and was knighted the same year. He had hoped to be appointed Attorney General, but never reached that office.

He was sworn of the Privy Council in the 1927 New Year Honours, and after leaving the House of Commons, he returned to his private legal practice. In 1935 he was appointed as a Lord Justice of Appeal, and in 1940 became the senior lord justice. Lord Justice Scott chaired the Committee on Land Utilisation in Rural Areas, established by Lord Reith in 1941; his report was one of the foundations of the 1947 Town and Country Planning Act.

He retired in 1948, and died in Oxford in 1950.

Parliament of the United Kingdom
Preceded by Max Muspratt	Member of Parliament for Liverpool Exchange; 1910–1929	Succeeded by James Philip Reynolds
Political offices
Preceded by Ernest Pollock	Solicitor General for England and Wales; 1922	Succeeded by Thomas Inskip
