= Election address =

Material sent out during a political campaign

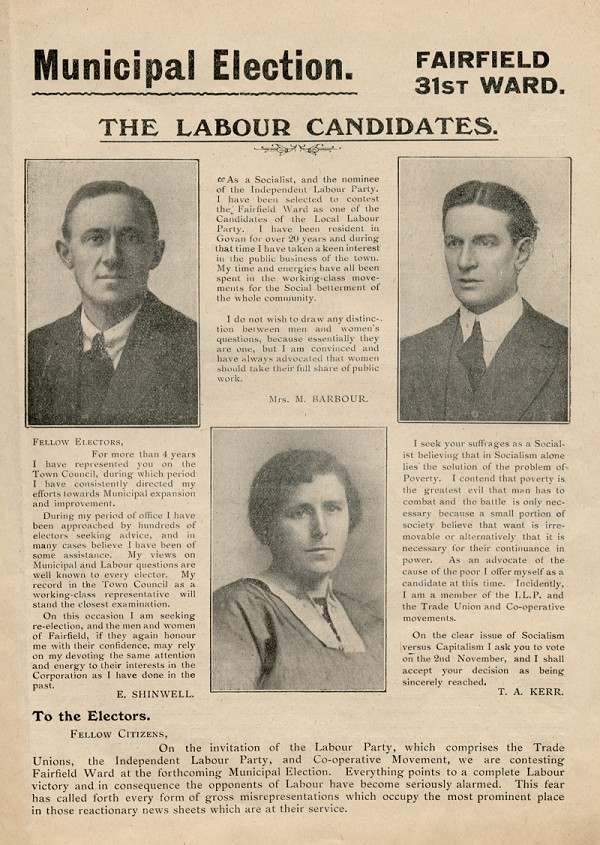
Election address of three Labour candidates, Mary Barbour, Manny Shinwell, and Tom Kerr, for the Govan Fairfield ward in the Glasgow Municipal elections of 1920.

An election address is the material sent out by a candidate during a political campaign. Election addresses are normally only sent out during the election period itself. Other political leaflets are usually known by different names.

In UK parliamentary elections, all candidates are entitled to have one election address delivered free by Royal Mail to every voter in their constituency.
