= John Russell Reynolds =

British neurologist and physician

Sir John Russell Reynolds, 1st Baronet
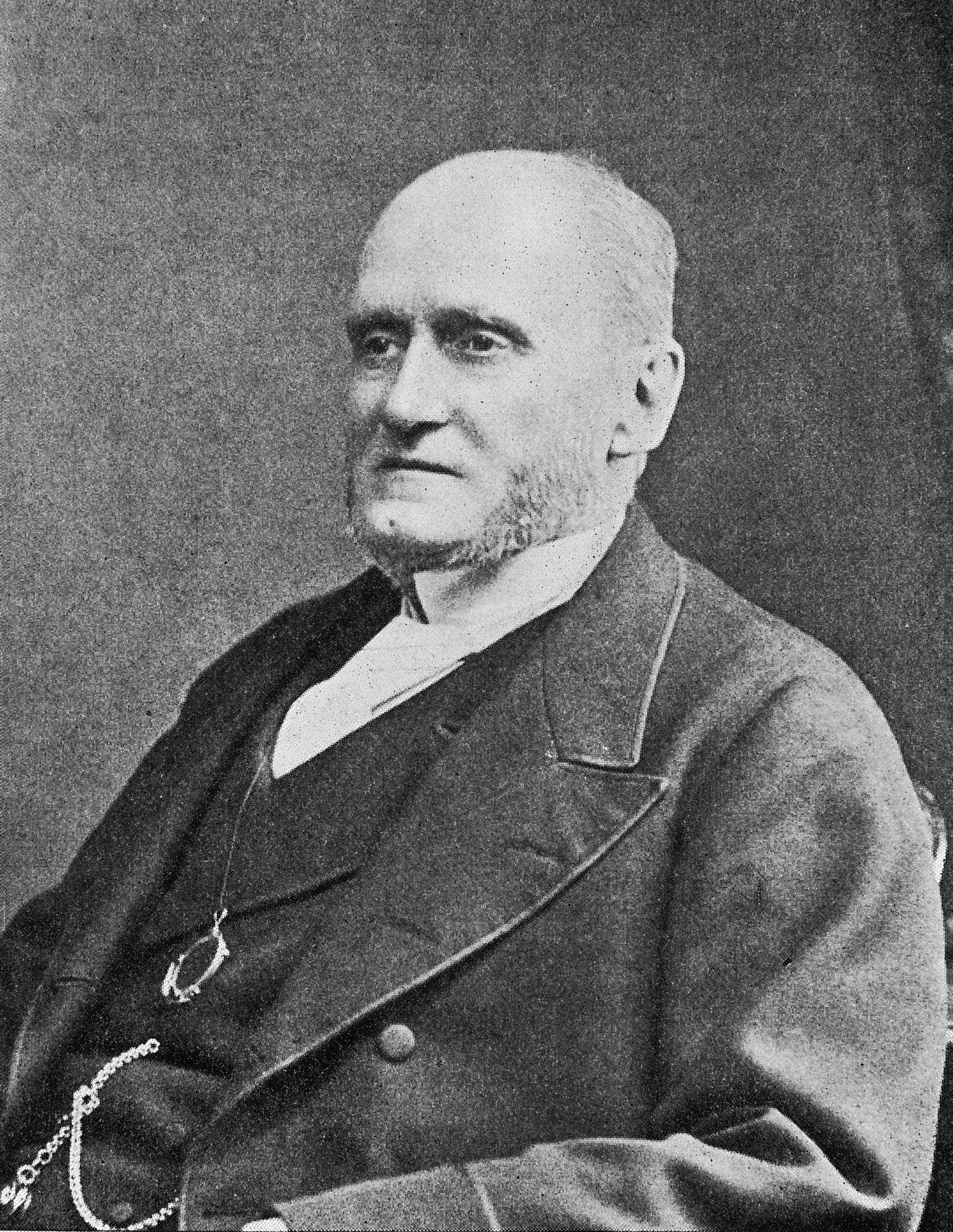
- Born: 22 May 1828; Romsey, Hampshire, England
- Died: 29 May 1896 (aged 68); London, England
- Occupation: Neurologist

Sir John Russell Reynolds, 1st Baronet (22 May 1828 – 29 May 1896) was a British neurologist and physician.

== Life ==
Reynolds was born in Romsey, Hampshire, as son of John Reynolds, an independent minister, and grandson of Dr. Henry Revell Reynolds. He received general education from his father, and was educated in his profession at University College, London, where he obtained three gold medals in the medical school. In 1851 he graduated M.B. in the university of London, and obtained a scholarship and gold medal in medicine. In 1852 he took the degree of M.D., and began practice in Leeds. He soon after moved to London, and took a house, 38 Grosvenor Street, in which Dr. Marshall Hall had lived. Hall announced to his patients in a printed circular that Reynolds had succeeded him in practice. Such procedure was contrary to a recognised understanding among physicians, and Hall incurred the censure of the College of Physicians. Reynolds was not involved in the censure.

Reynolds was elected a Fellow of the College in 1859. In the same year he was appointed assistant physician to University College Hospital, to which he continued attached throughout life. He had before been, in 1855, assistant physician to the Hospital for Sick Children, and in 1857 assistant physician to the Westminster Hospital. In 1865 he became professor of the principles and practice of medicine at University College, and in 1878 he was appointed physician-in-ordinary to the queen's household. He gained a considerable practice as a physician, and was often consulted in difficult cases of nervous disease. In 1869 he was elected a fellow of the Royal Society, and in 1883 vice-president of the Royal Medical and Chirurgical Society. He delivered the Lumleian lecture at the College of Physicians in 1867, the Harveian oration in 1884, and was elected president in 1893, on the death of Sir Andrew Clark. He was re-elected in 1894 and 1895, and on 1 January in the latter year was created a baronet. In the winter of 1895–6 he became too ill to offer himself for re-election as president of the College of Physicians.

Escutcheon of the Reynolds baronets of Grosvenor Street

The Reynolds baronetcy, of Grosvenor Street, was created in the Baronetage of the United Kingdom on 28 February 1895 for Reynolds.

== Works ==
Reynolds devoted himself from an early period to the study of nervous diseases, and in 1854 published an Essay on Vertigo; in 1855 Diagnosis of Diseases of the Brain, Spinal Cord, and Nerves, as well as Tables for the Diagnosis of Diseases of the Brain; in 1861 a treatise on epilepsy; in 1871 Lectures on the Clinical Uses of Electricity; in 1872 The Scientific Value of the Legal Tests of Insanity; besides many papers in medical periodicals and the transactions of medical societies, and several addresses to medical associations. His writings on nervous diseases were useful contributions to a department of medicine in which much work remained undone, but in the flood of modern observations they have been submerged. He will chiefly be remembered among physicians as the editor of the System of Medicine, in five volumes, published from 1866 to 1879, a collection of essays on diseases, written by the most competent men who could be induced to write—compositions of varying merit, but generally of high value. He himself wrote the parts on erysipelas, on inflammation of the lymphatics, and on several forms of nervous disease. He published in 1893 a Life of Dr. Walter Hayle Walshe.

== Death ==
John Russell Reynolds died at his house in Grosvenor Street, London, after several weeks of illness of a pulmonary congestion, on 29 May 1896.

== Family ==
Reynolds was married, firstly, at St Pancras Old Church, London, on 28 August 1852 to Margaretta Susannah Ainslie (1831–1880), and, secondly, to Frances née Plunkett, widow of C. J. C. Crespigny. He left no children and baronetcy became extinct on his death.

Baronetage of the United Kingdom
New creation	Baronet (of Grosvenor Street); 1895–1896	Extinct
Preceded by Erichsen baronets	Reynolds baronets of Grosvenor Street; 28 February 1895	Succeeded by Dale baronets
