= 1887 Liverpool Exchange by-election =

UK Parliamentary by-election

The 1887 Liverpool Exchange by-election was held on 26 January 1887 after the death of the incumbent Liberal MP David Duncan. It was retained by the Liberal candidate Ralph Neville, with a narrow majority of 7 votes.

Goschen was Chancellor of the Exchequer. He had voted against Gladstone's Home Rule Bill in 1886 and became a Liberal Unionist. He subsequently lost his seat at Edinburgh East at the 1886 general election.

Lord Randolph Churchill resigned as Chancellor of the Exchequer on 22 December 1886. The Marquess of Salisbury appointed Goschen to the post on 14 January 1887. He became the sole Liberal Unionist in an otherwise Conservative government.

Goschen was therefore Chancellor outside the House of Commons and contested the by-election to return to the House.

Liverpool Exchange by-election, 1887
Party	Candidate	Votes	%	±%
Liberal	Ralph Neville	3,217	50.1	−1.4
Liberal Unionist	George Goschen	3,210	49.9	+1.4
Majority		7	0.2	−2.8
Turnout		6,427	81.2	+11.8
Liberal hold		Swing	-1.4	
