= St John's Gardens, Liverpool =

Open space in Liverpool, England

Coordinates: 53°24′32″N 2°58′53″W

St John's Gardens
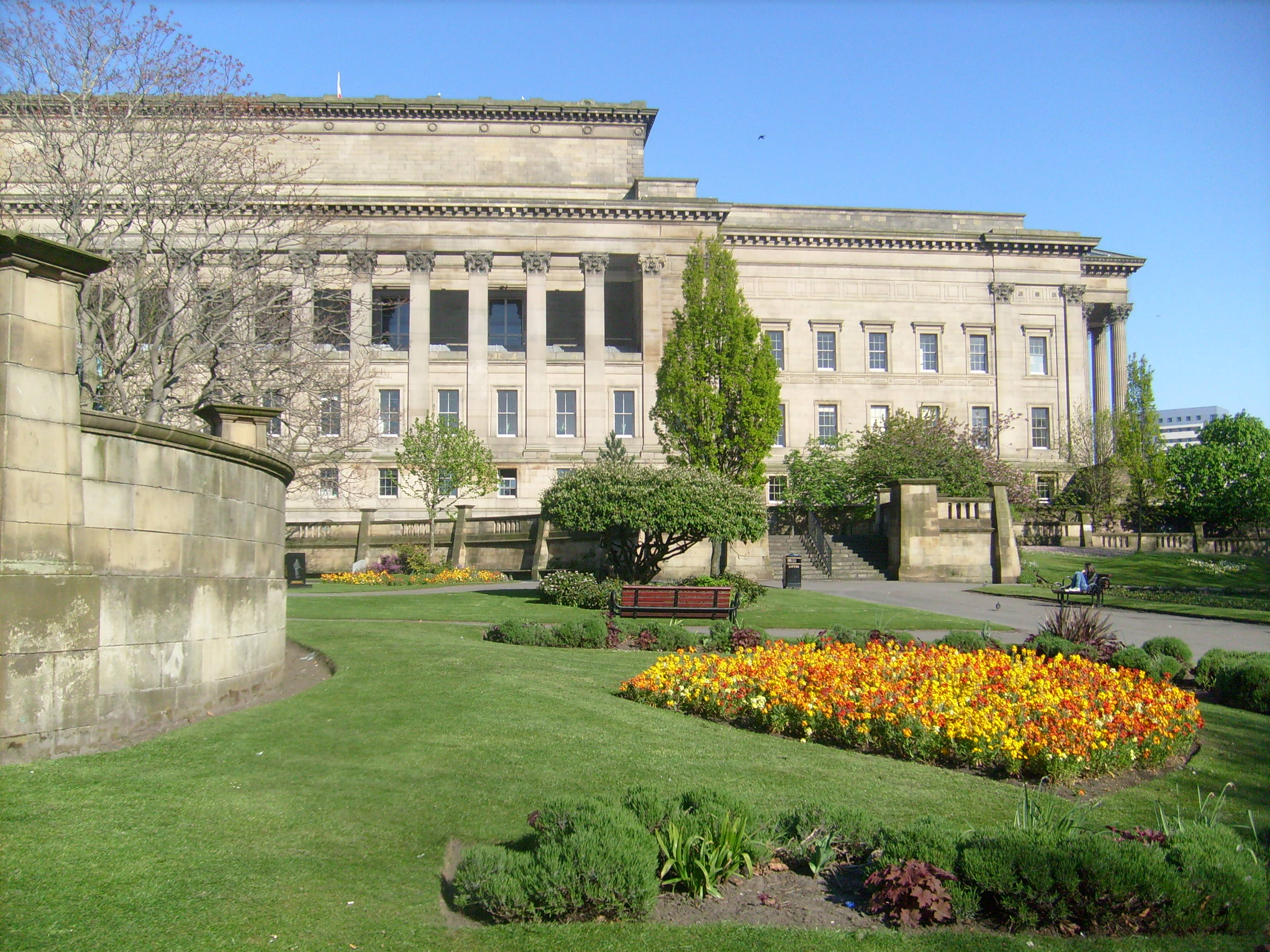
- Interactive map of St John's Gardens
- Type: Public park
- Location: Liverpool, England
- Website: liverpool.gov.uk/parks-and-greenspaces/local-parks-and-greenspaces/gardens/st-johns-gardens/

St John's Gardens is an open space in Liverpool, England, to the west of St George's Hall. The gardens are part of the William Brown Street conservation area. The gardens contain ornamental flower beds, and memorials to notable people of the city.

== History ==
The gardens stand in a former area of heathland known as The Great Heath, which continued to exist until the middle of the 18th century. As Liverpool grew, the land was built on, and towards the end of the 19th century it had been completely developed. The land sloped upwards to the east of the developing city and was exposed to the winds, making it a suitable site for windmills and for public lines to dry washing. In 1749 the city's first General Infirmary was built on the site, followed by the Seaman's Hospital in 1752, a dispensary in 1778, and a lunatic asylum in 1789. Industry also came to the site; in addition to windmills, there were rope works, potteries, a marble yard, and a row of lime kilns.

From 1767 the land towards the top of the slope had been the town cemetery, and in 1784 the St. John's Church, dedicated to Saint John the Baptist, was built in the middle of the cemetery. By 1854 the cemetery was full, and the church was demolished in 1898. Meanwhile the other buildings in the area had been demolished, the industries closed, and St George's Hall had been built, opening in 1854. At the beginning of the 20th century it was decided to landscape the former cemetery. The remains of most of the bodies were removed and buried elsewhere. The site was redeveloped and opened in 1904 as "St John's Ornamental and Memorial Gardens". The gardens were designed by the corporation surveyor Thomas Shelmerdine. In addition to the creation of flower beds, statues and memorials were erected in the gardens.

== Monuments ==
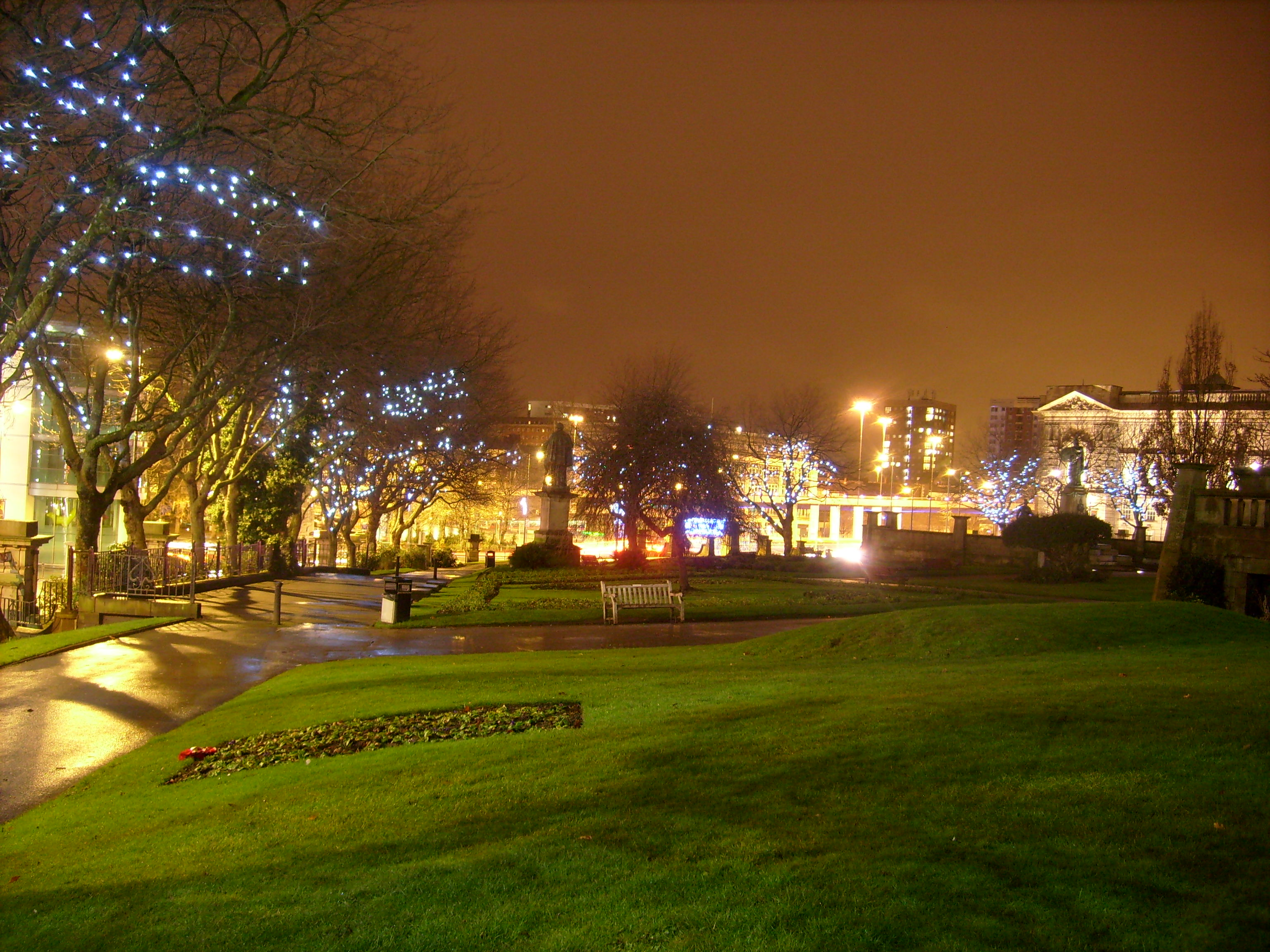
St John's Gardens at Christmas

The gardens contain seven memorial statues, each of which is recorded in the National Heritage List for England as a designated Grade II listed building. The Rathbone Monument commemorates William Rathbone who died in 1902, although the monument had been made in 1899. It was created by George Frampton, and consists of a bronze robed figure standing on a stone pedestal. Its inscription records that Rathbone founded the district nursing movement, and the forerunners of the Universities of Liverpool and North Wales. The Gladstone Monument is to the memory of W. E. Gladstone, a former Prime Minister, who was born in Liverpool and who died in 1898. The monument dates from 1904 and was made by Thomas Brock. It consists of a bronze figure of Gladstone holding books and a roll of parchment, standing on a stone pedestal containing carvings of female figures representing Truth and Justice. The Balfour Monument commemorates Alexander Balfour, businessman and philanthropist who died in 1886. The monument dates from 1889, was sculpted by Albert Bruce-Joy, and consists of a bronze figure on a stone pedestal. The Lester Monument is to the memory of Canon Major Thomas Lester who died in 1903, and who founded charities for children in Liverpool. It was made by George Frampton, erected in 1907, and depicts a bronze figure holding a child, standing on a stone pedestal. The Nugent Memorial commemorates James Nugent, a Roman Catholic priest who worked with child welfare. The monument is dated 1906, was created by F. W. Pomeroy, and consists of a bronze figure in the attitude of blessing, and a ragged boy, both standing on a stone pedestal decorated with a bronze wreath. The Forwood Monument is to the memory of Sir Arthur Forwood, a local businessman and politician, who died in 1898. The monument was erected in 1903, was made by George Frampton and, again, is a bronze figure on a stone pedestal. Also in the gardens is a monument commemorating the service of the King's Regiment in the South African War. It is dated 1905 and was sculpted by Sir W. Goscombe John. It is in white stone with a bronze wreath, and includes the figure of Britannia, military objects, standing soldiers, and a drummer boy. Also listed at Grade II are the stone walls and the gate piers surrounding the gardens. They date from 1904 and were designed by Thomas Shelmerdine.

=== Gallery of Monuments in St John's Gardens ===
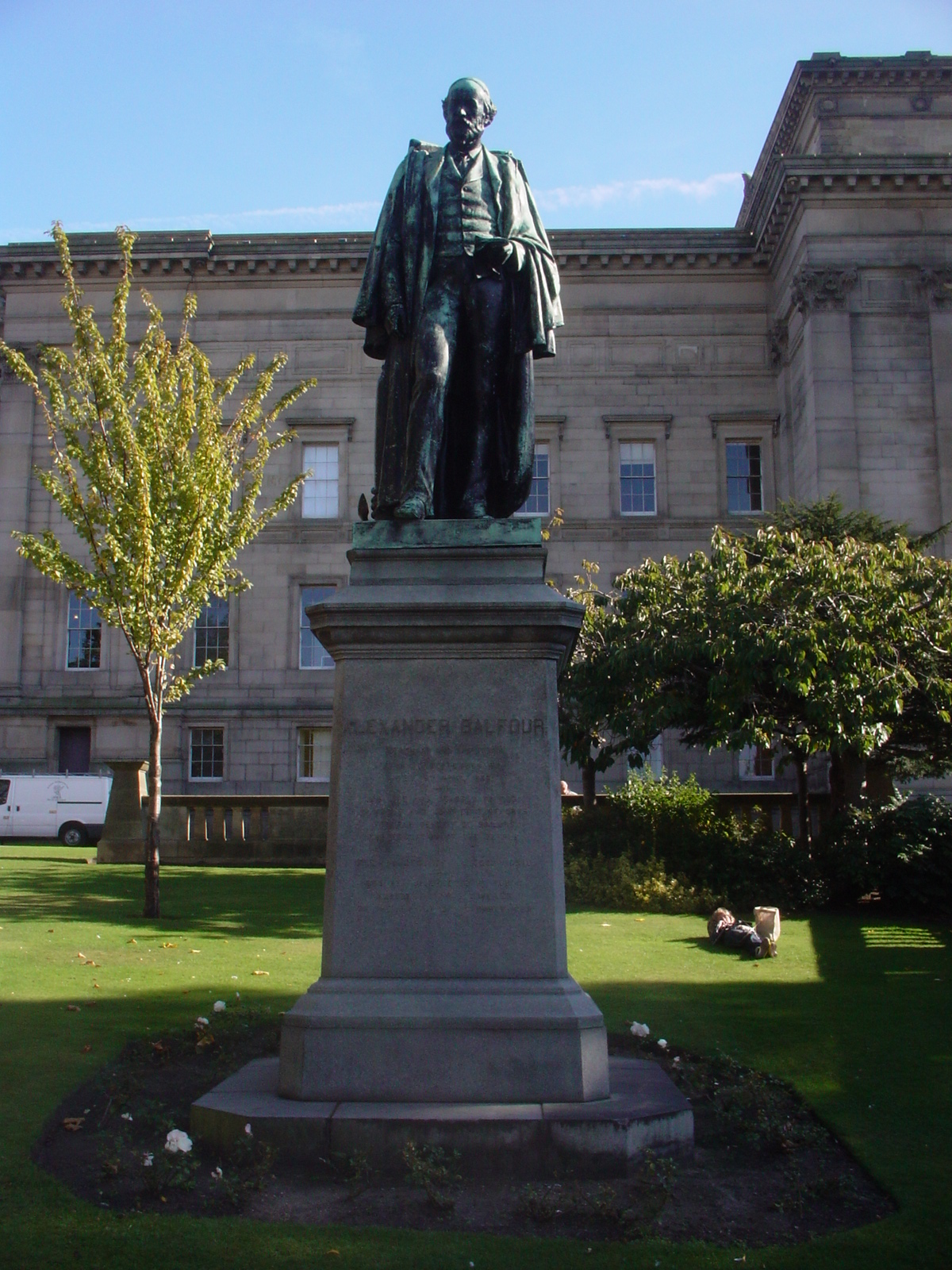
Statue of Alexander Balfour, by Albert Bruce-Joy, plinth designed by Alfred Waterhouse
(1889; Grade II)

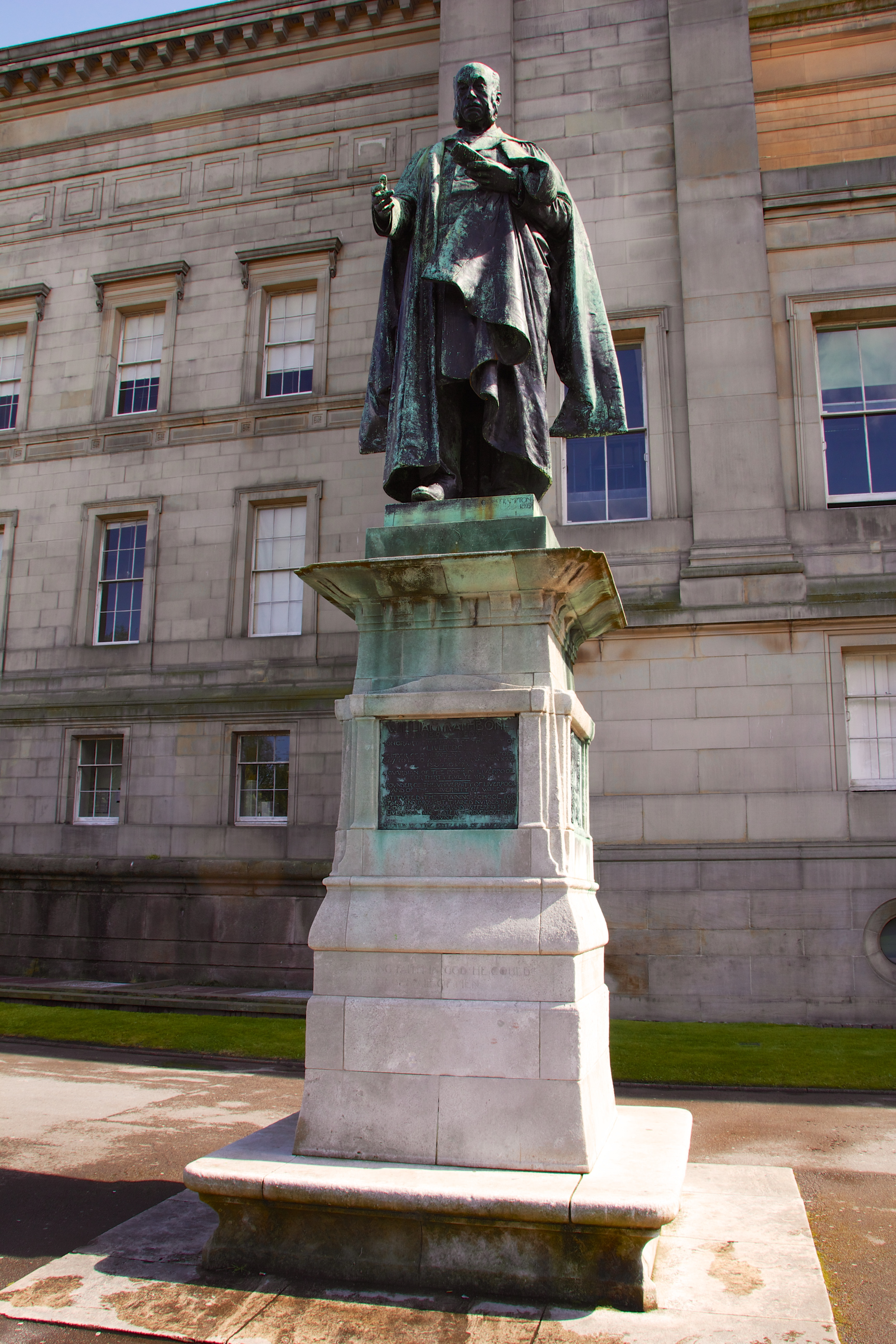
Statue to William Rathbone, by George Frampton
(1899-1900; Grade II)

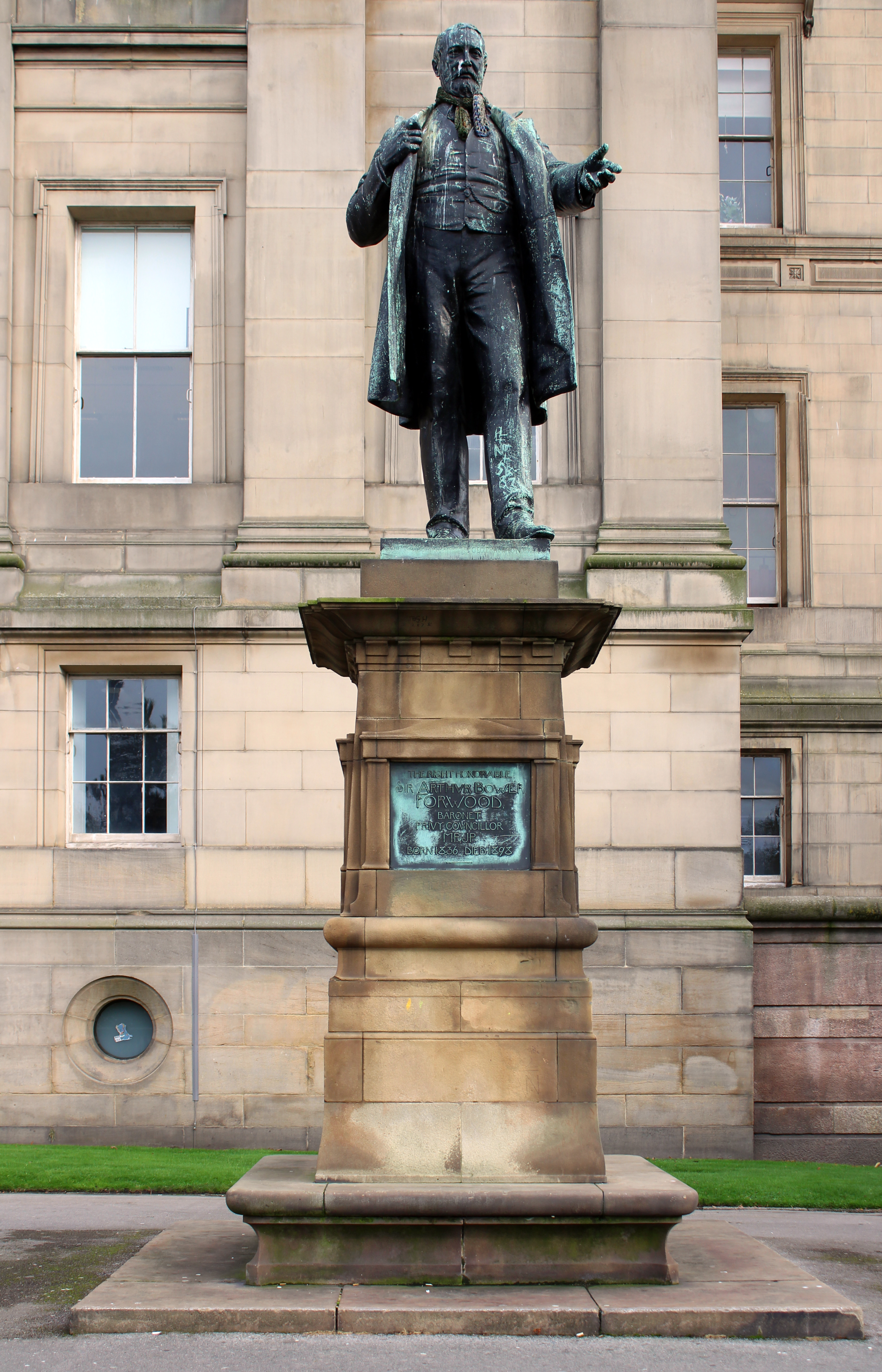
Statue to Arthur Forwood, by George Frampton
(1903; Grade II)

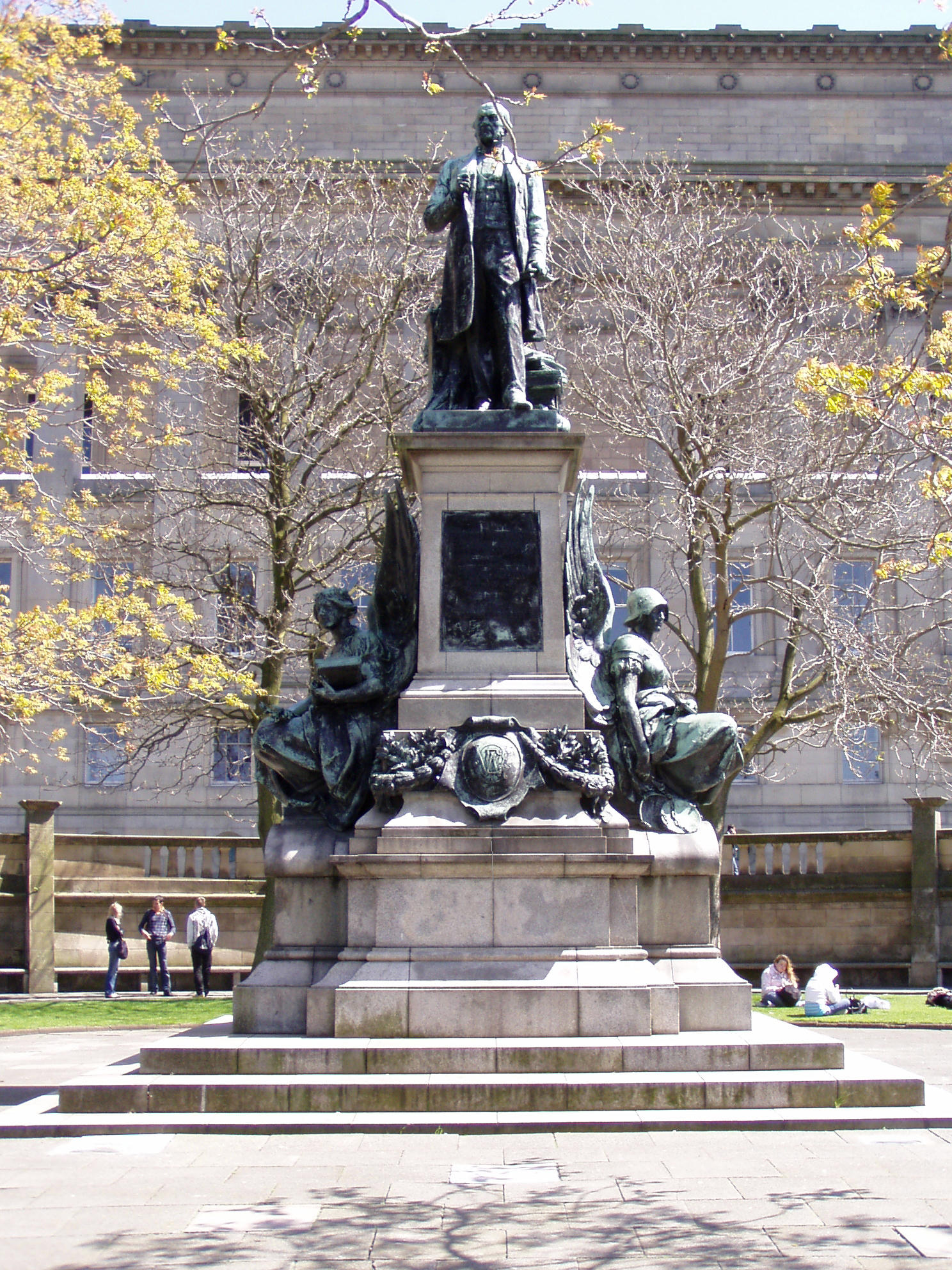
Memorial to William Ewart Gladstone, by Thomas Brock
(1904; Grade II)

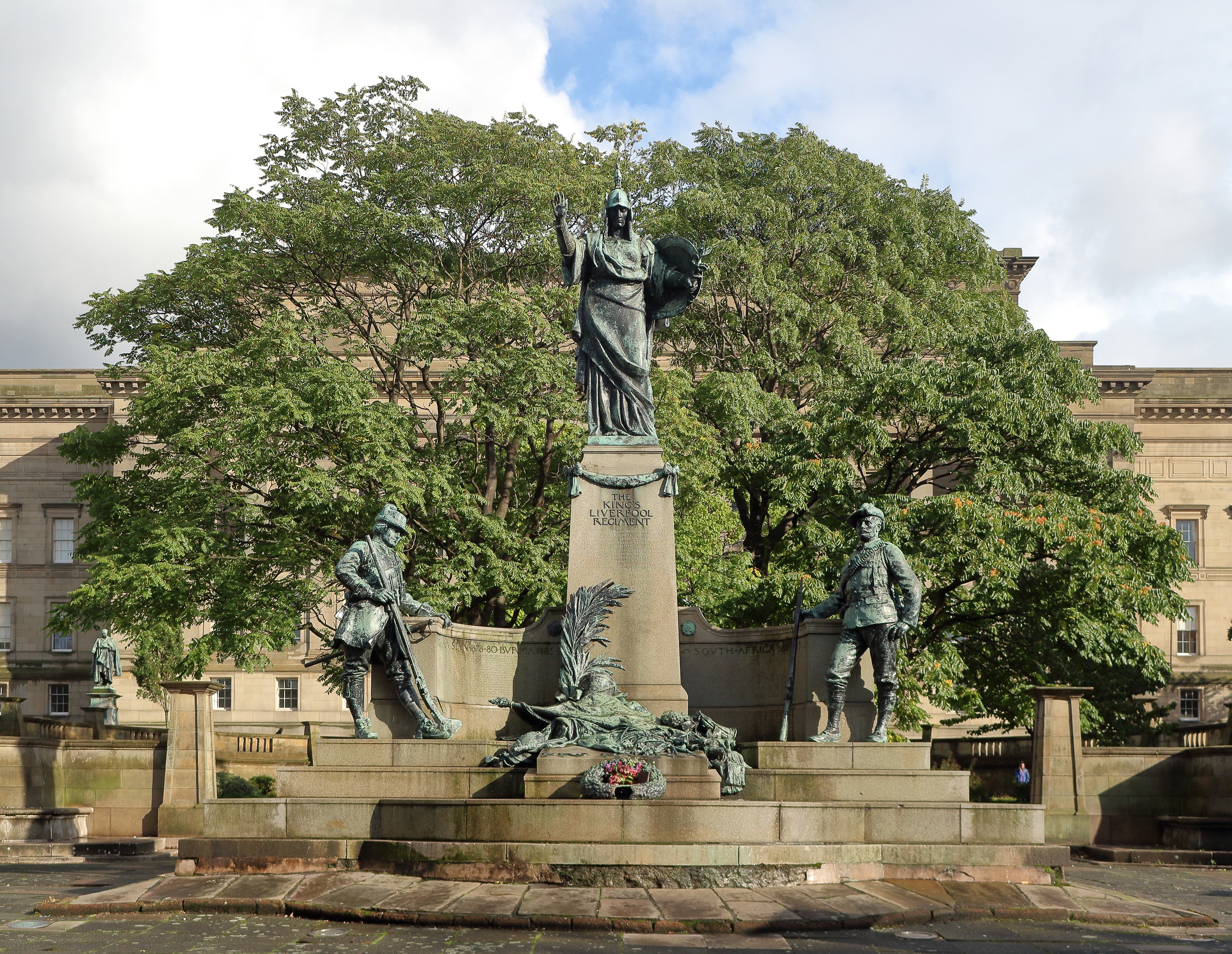
Monument to the King's Regiment, by Goscombe John
(1905; Grade II)

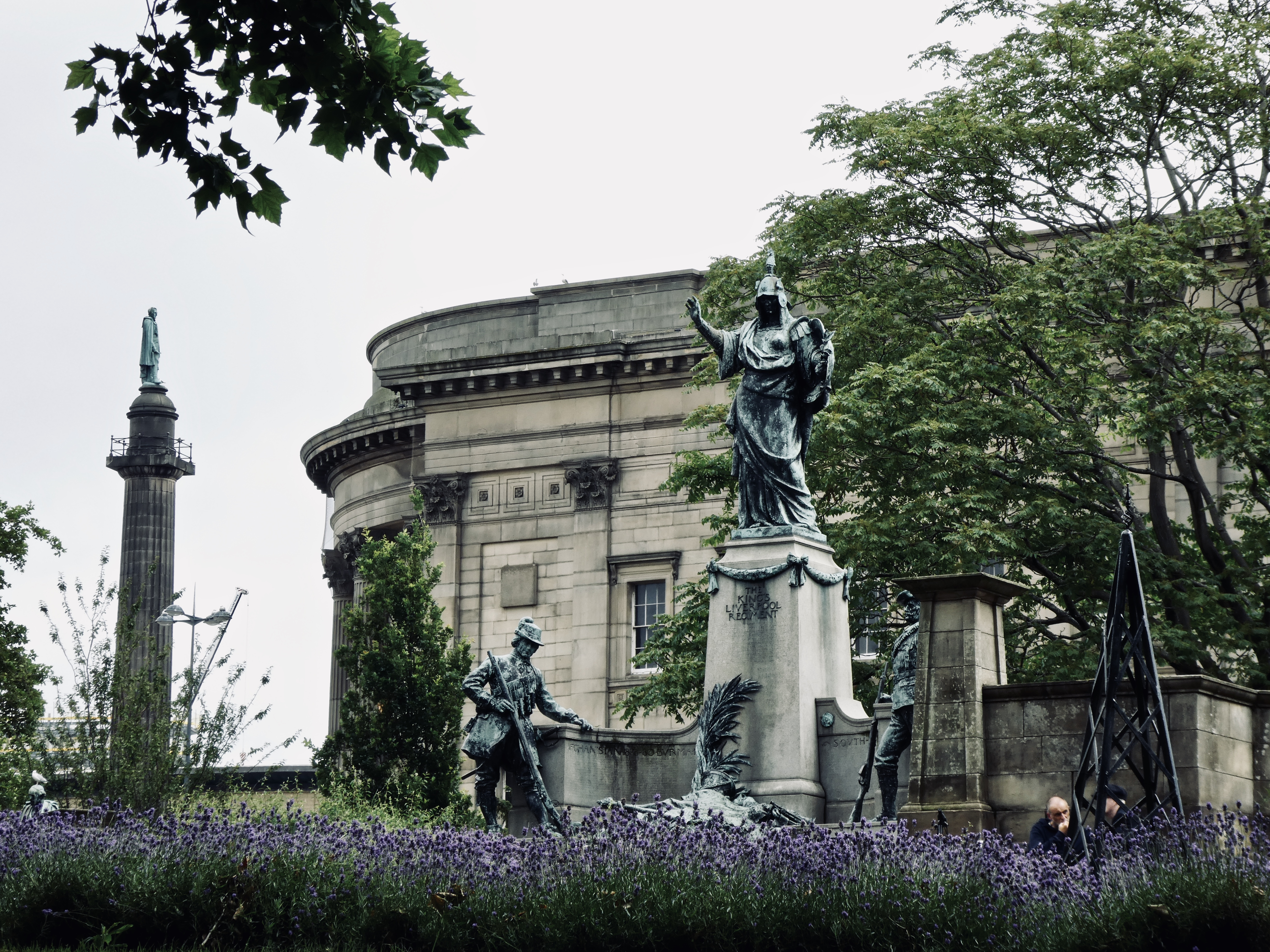
Front of the Monument to the King's Regiment, by Goscombe John
(1905; Grade II). Wellington's Column in the background.

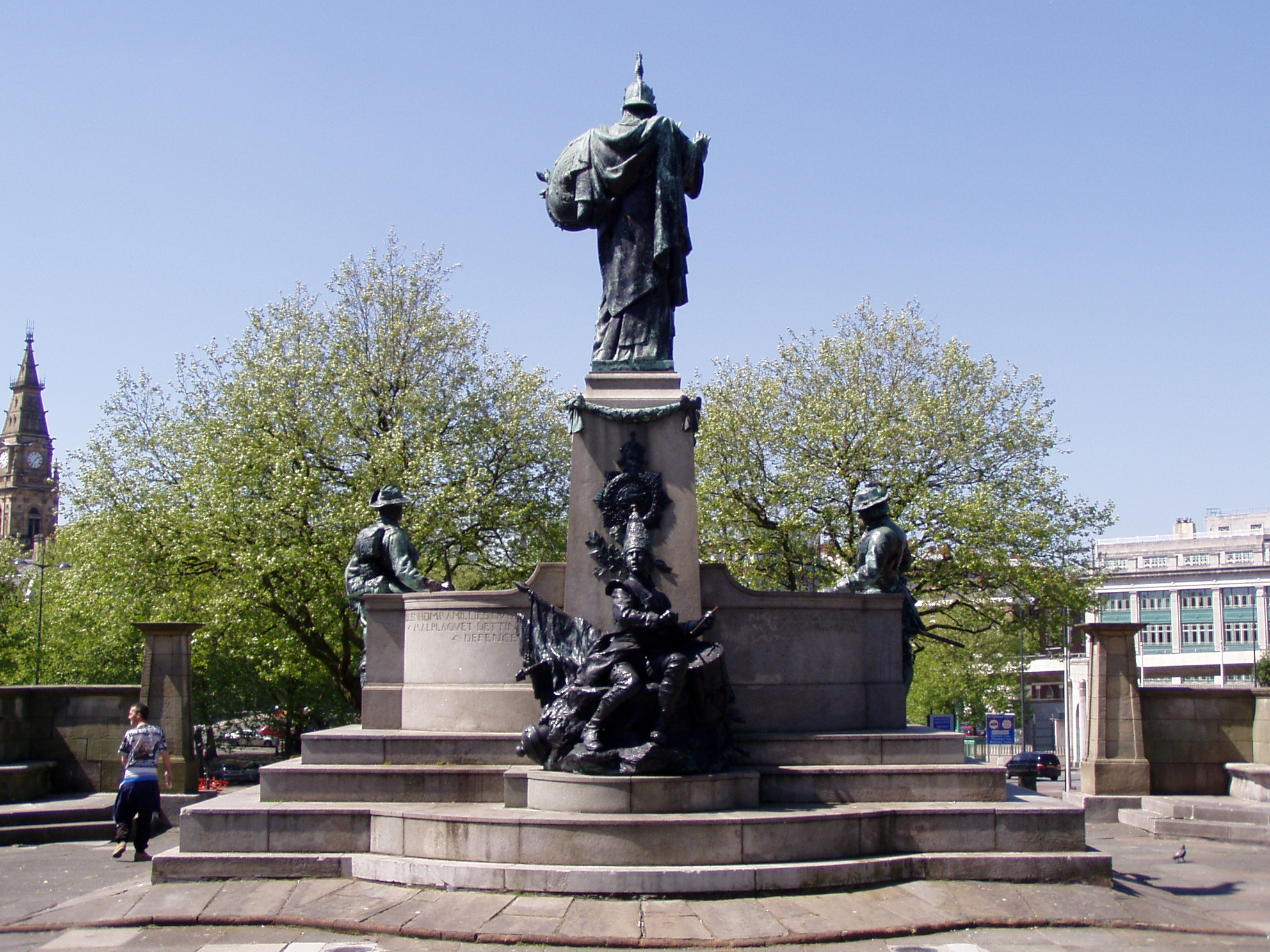
The back of the Monument to the King's Regiment, by Goscombe John
(1905; Grade II)

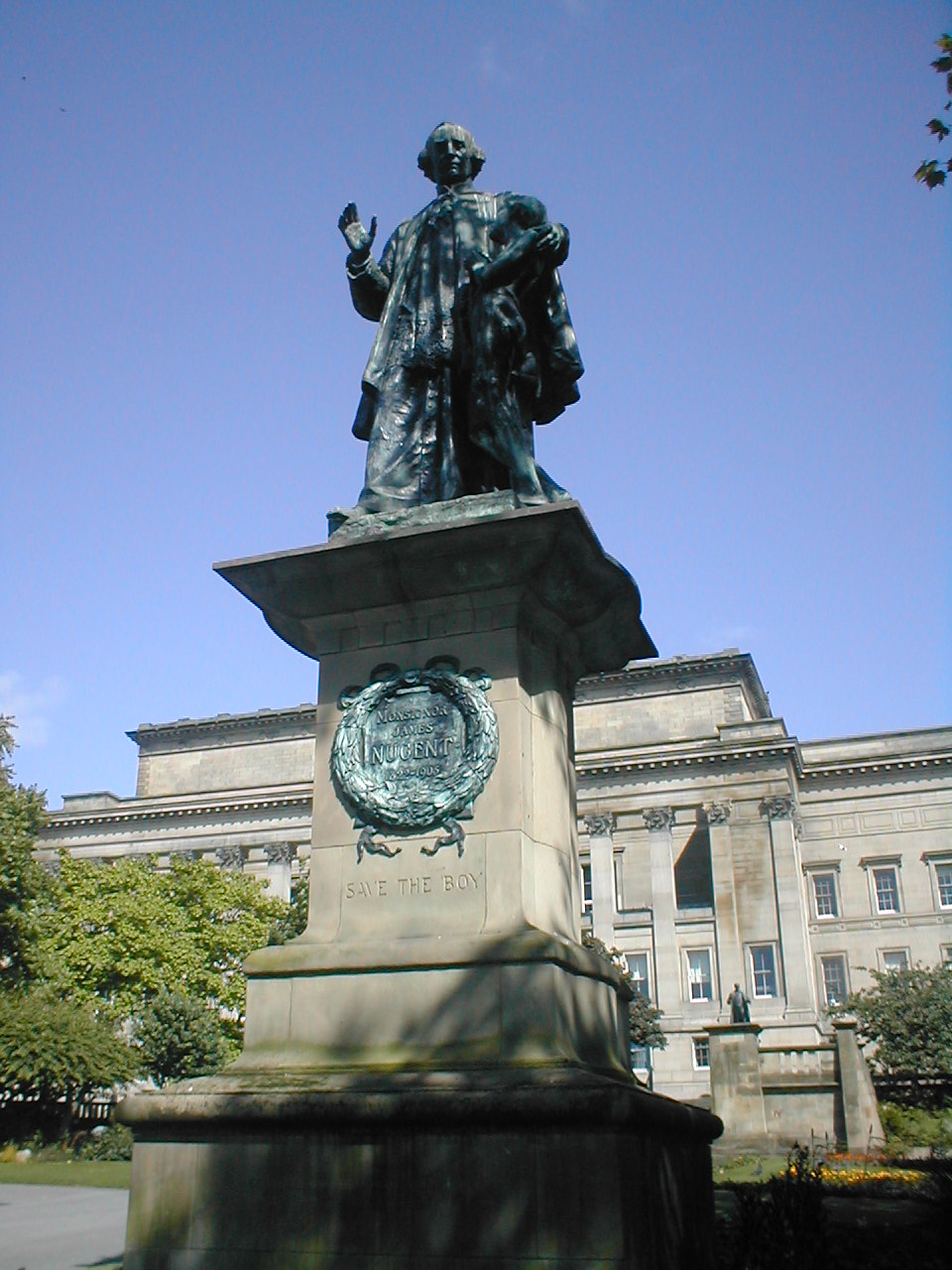
Statue to James Nugent, by F. W. Pomeroy
(1905; Grade II)

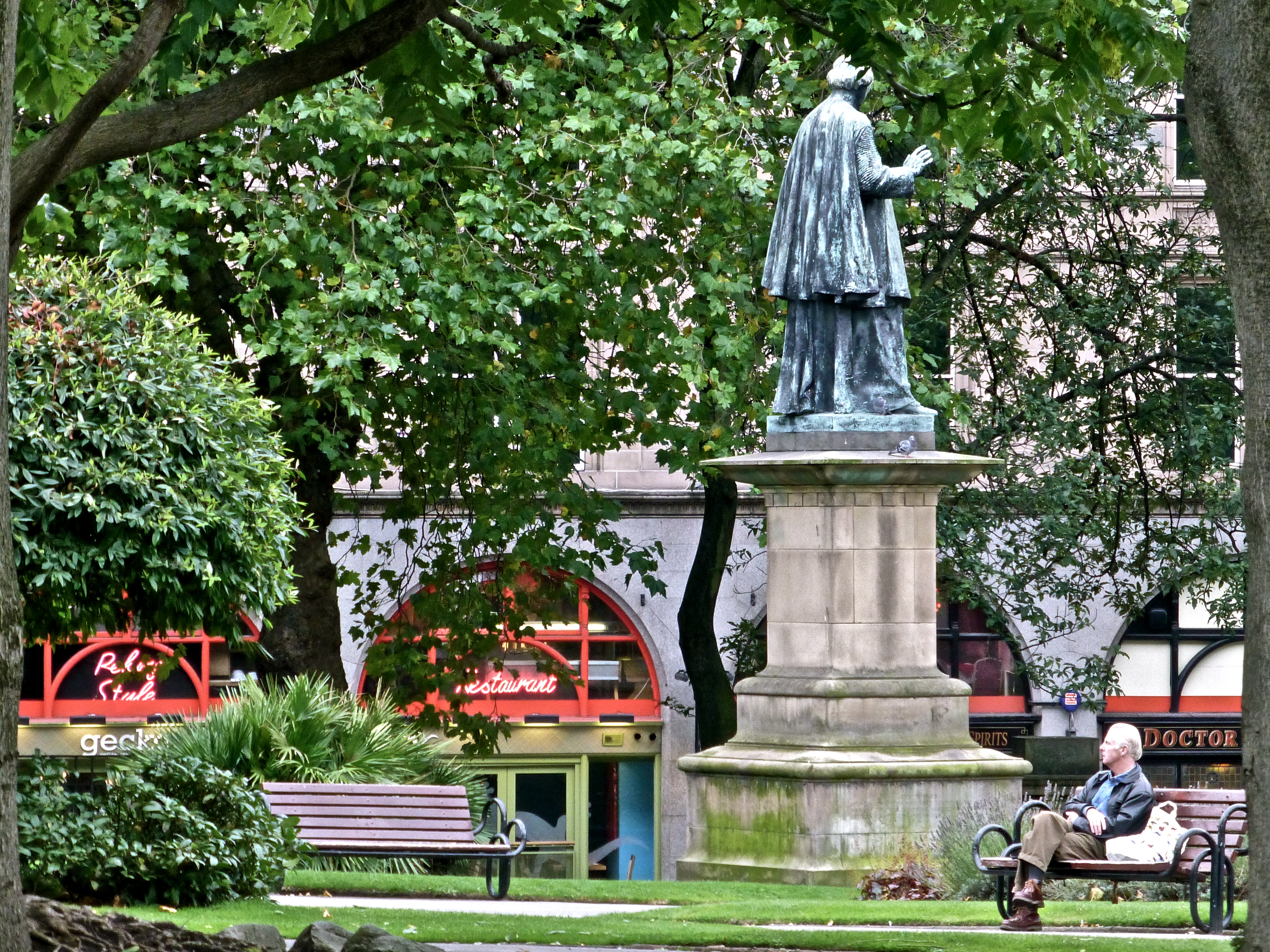
Side view of the Statue to James Nugent, by F. W. Pomeroy
(1905; Grade II)

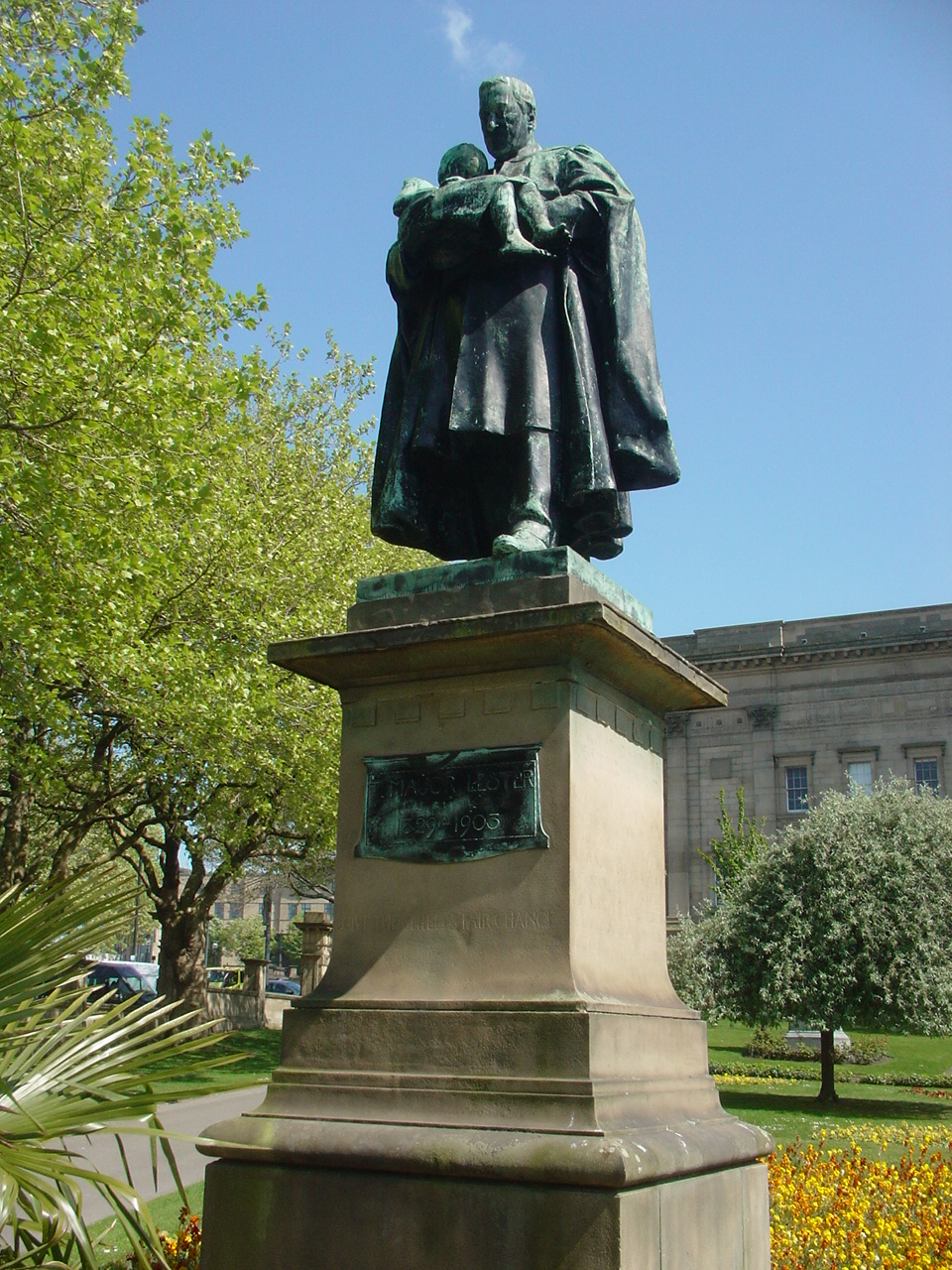
Statue to Canon Major Thomas Lester, by George Frampton
(1907; Grade II)

== See also ==
- List of public art in Liverpool
