= James Nugent (priest) =

Roman Catholic priest (1822–1905)

The Reverend Monsignor James Nugent
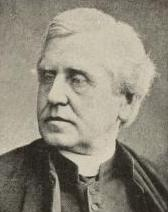
- Photograph of Fr. Nugent

Personal life
- Born: 3 March 1822 Liverpool, Lancashire, England
- Died: 27 June 1905 (aged 83)
- Education: St Cuthbert's College, Ushaw; English College, Rome
- Known for: Social reformer and care of the poor

Religious life
- Religion: Christianity
- Denomination: Roman Catholic Church
- Ordination: 30 August 1846 (priesthood)

Monsignor James Nugent (3 March 1822 – 27 June 1905), known as Father Nugent, was a Roman Catholic priest of the Archdiocese of Liverpool. Because he was also a pioneer in relation to child welfare, poverty relief and social reform, Nugent Care was founded upon his ideals.

== Biography ==
Nugent was born on 3 March 1822 in Hunter Street, Liverpool. Nugent was educated in Ushaw College from 1838 to 1843 before he became a student at the English College in Rome. He was ordained to the Diaconate in 1845, and on 30 August a year later he was ordained to the Priesthood at St Nicholas's, Liverpool.

In 1849 he started a Ragged School in Spitalfields and on 7 January 1850 he opened a Middle School for Boys in Rodney Street along with Fr Worthy. In 1856 the Catholic Reformatory Association was established with Nugent as secretary. Nugent was named as the owner and editor of the Northern Press in 1859, and in 1860 he founded The Catholic Times and a number of other publications.

On 1 January 1860 Nugent was appointed the first Catholic chaplain to Walton Gaol. Nugent and Bishop O'Reilly jointly founded the Liverpool Catholic Children's Protection Society on 16 April 1881. In 1891 Nugent opened a refuge for fallen women in Paul Street, Liverpool.

On 12 June 1892 Nugent was made a domestic prelate with the title of Monsignor by Pope Leo XIII. On 16 May 1905, whilst returning home from a trip aboard the RMS Oceanic, Nugent had a bad fall on the deck, sustaining a head injury and impairment of sight. He died on 27 June 1905 at age 83 at the Harewood House, Formby after contracting pneumonia.

== Memorialisation ==
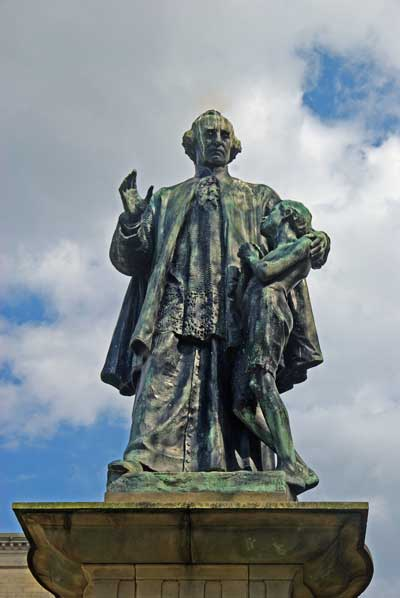
Statue of James Nugent in St Johns Gardens Liverpool.

There is a statue of James Nugent in St John's Gardens, Liverpool. The inscription states: "Save the Boy". The sculptor was F. W. Pomeroy, and it was erected in 1906. It was made a Grade II listed monument on 14 March 1975.
