= Monument to the King's Liverpool Regiment =

War memorial in Liverpool, England

- United Kingdom
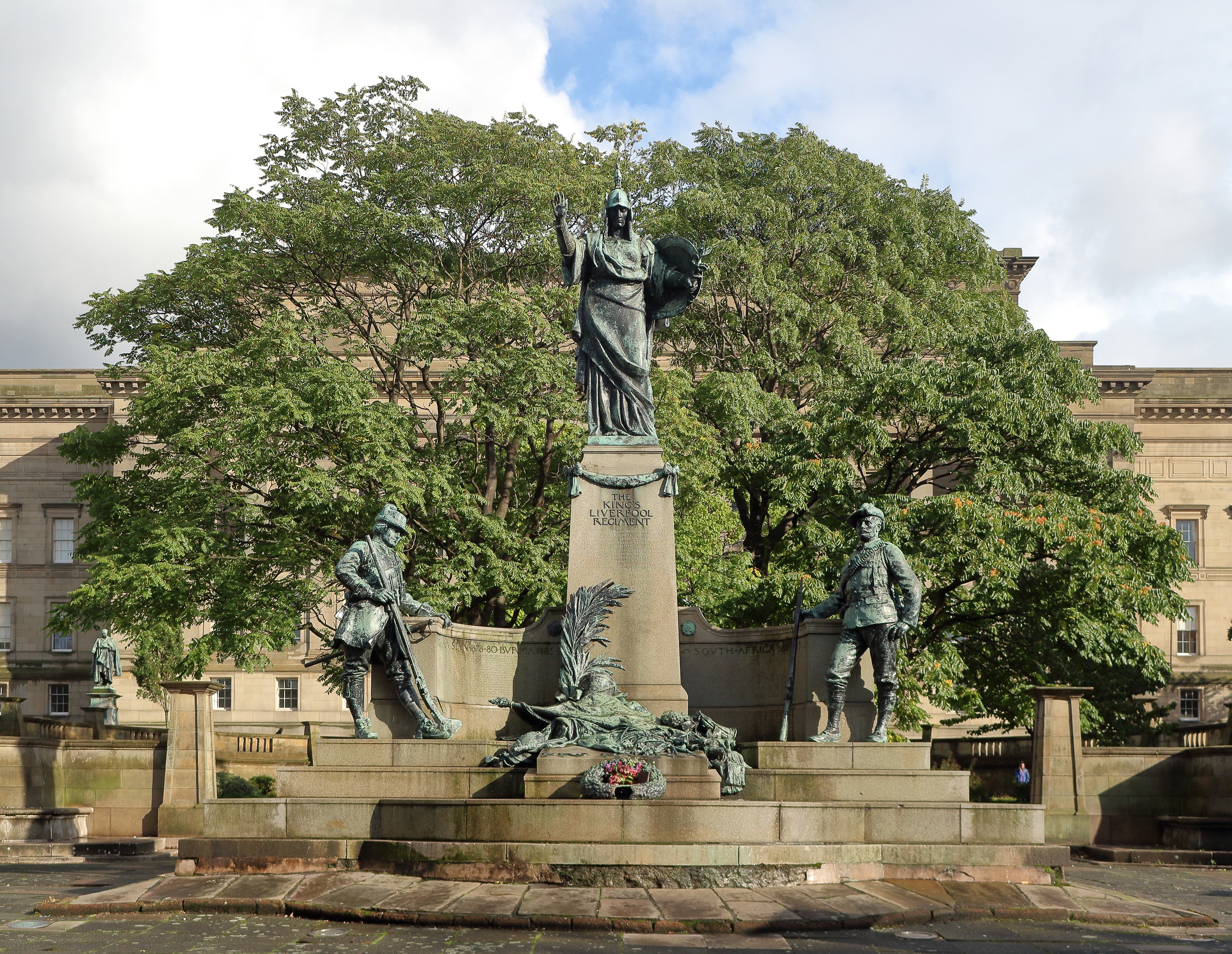
- For Members of the King's Regiment (Liverpool) who lost their lives on campaign in Afghanistan (1878–1880), Burma (1885–1887) and South Africa (1899–1902)
- Unveiled: 4 August 1905; 120 years ago
- Location: 53°24′32.1″N 2°58′53.7″W; St John's Gardens, Liverpool
- Designed by: William Goscombe John
- THE KING'S LIVERPOOL REGIMENT

Listed Building – Grade II
- Official name: Monument to the King's Liverpool Regiment
- Designated: 14 March 1975
- Reference no.: 1073470

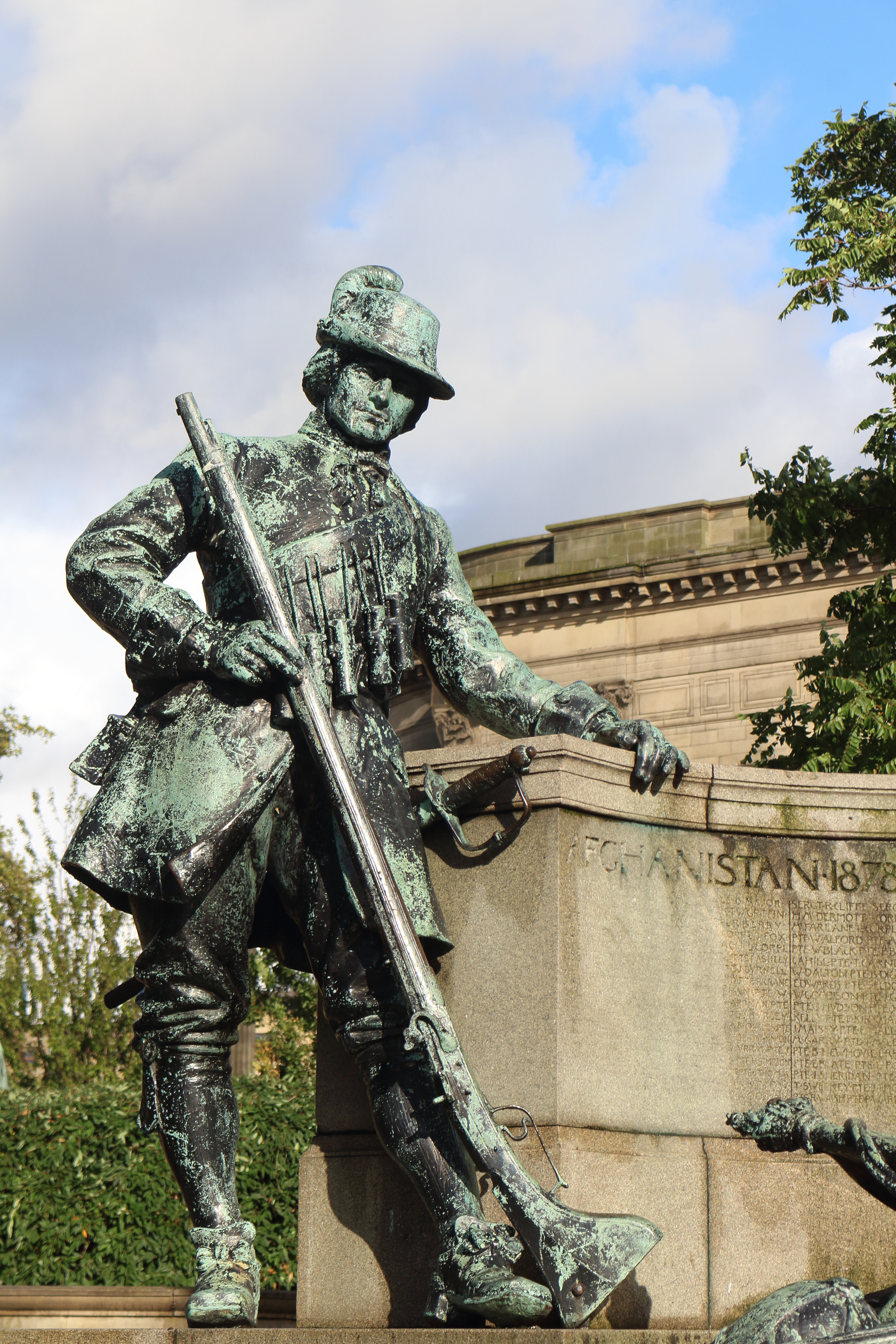
Soldier of 1685

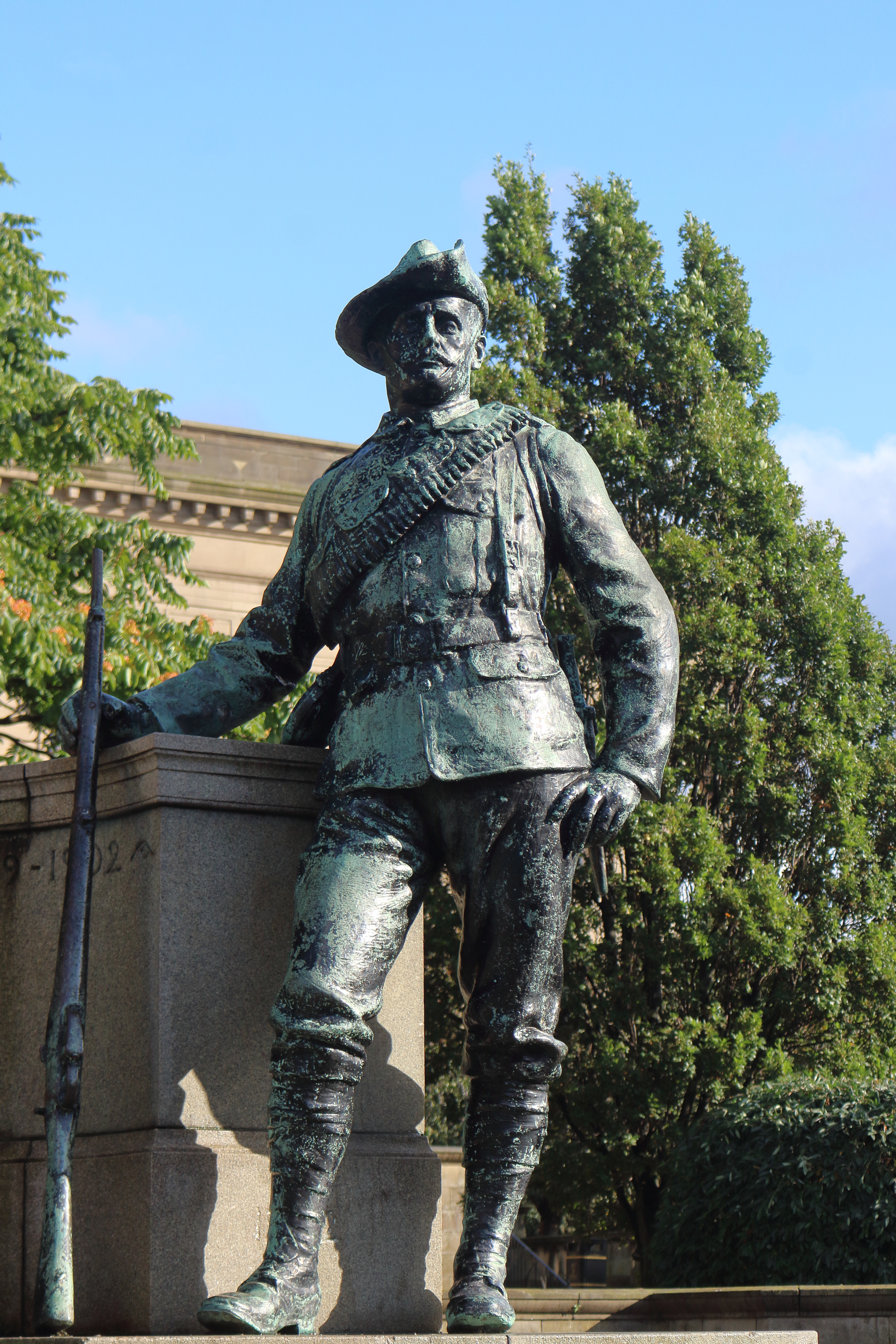
Soldier of the 1899–1902 Boer War

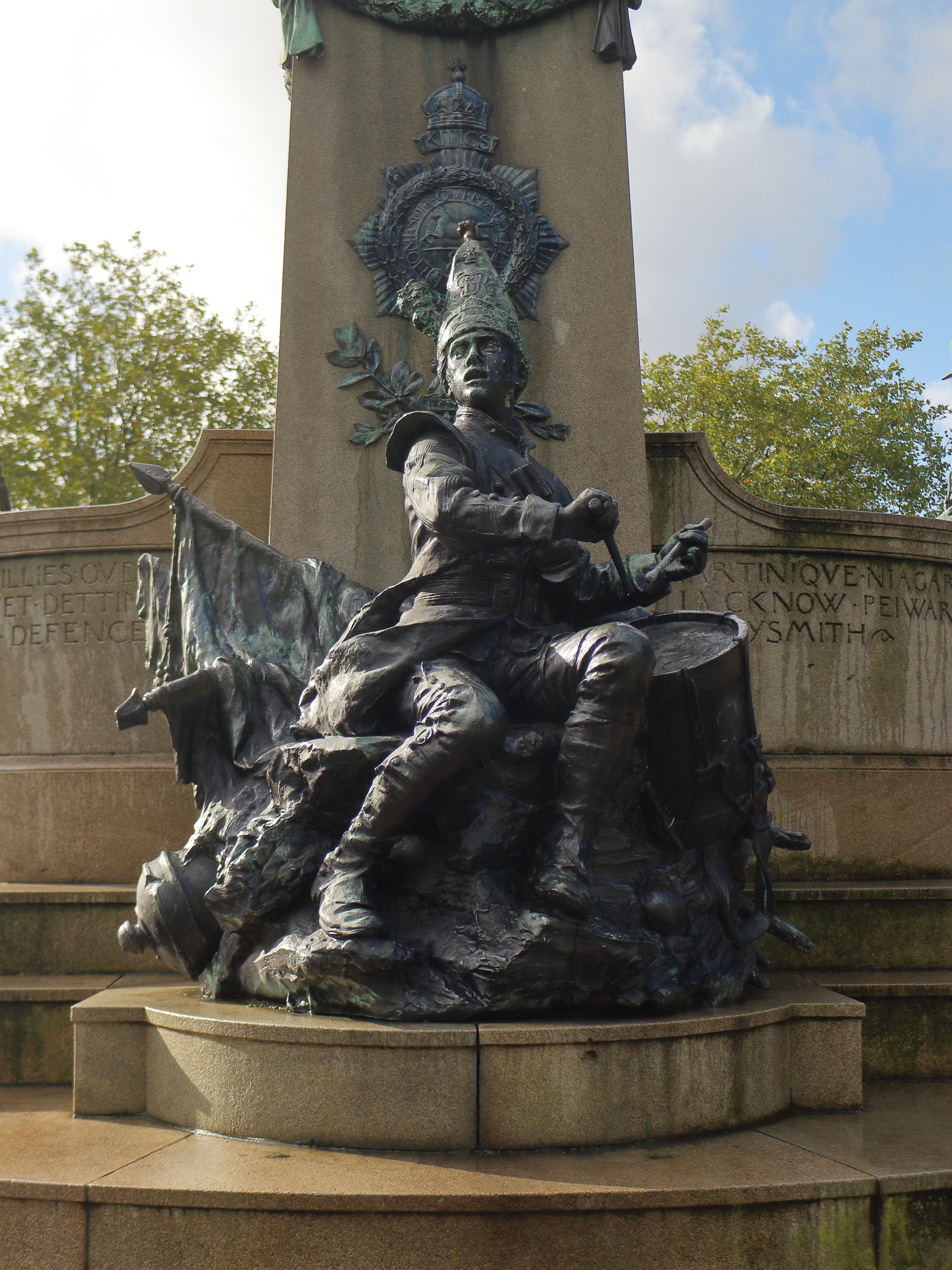
Drummer

The monument to the King's Liverpool Regiment is a war memorial in St John's Gardens in the city centre of Liverpool, England. The memorial commemorates those members of the King's Regiment (Liverpool) who lost their lives on campaign in the Second Anglo-Afghan War (1878–1880), the Third Anglo-Burmese War (1885–1887) and the Second Boer War (1899–1902). It was funded by a public subscription and with the support of the Corporation of Liverpool. It was unveiled on 4 August 1905 by Field Marshal Sir George White. The monument is a rare example of a large-scale public regimental memorial from the pre-First World War era. Its central figure is that of Britannia with other statues showing soldiers of the regiment in 1685, 1743 and 1902.

== Background ==
The King's Regiment (Liverpool) traces its origins to Princess Anne of Denmark's Regiment of Foot formed in 1685 in response to the Monmouth Rebellion against Anne's father James II of England. It became the Queen's Regiment during Anne's reign and, in recognition of its service in the 1715 Jacobite rising, was renamed the King's Regiment by George I. British Army regiments were allocated a locality for recruitment and depot purposes under the 1881 Childers Reforms and the King's Regiment was allocated Liverpool.

== Commissioning and construction ==
The King's Regiment served during the Second Boer War (1899–1902), including at the Siege of Ladysmith for which it received a battle honour. Towards the end of the war it was proposed that the city erect a memorial in honour of the regiment. On 11 February 1902 the Lord Mayor of Liverpool, Sir Charles Petrie, presided over a public meeting that resolved to proceed with erection of a monument "to the memory of the Officers and Men of the Regiment (Regulars, Militia, and Volunteers) who have fallen in Afghanistan, Burmah, and South Africa". The Corporation of Liverpool donated land for the monument within St John's Gardens within the city centre. The Gardens were formerly the site of a Georgian church and graveyard but were redeveloped by 1904 into a memorial garden to complement the nearby St George's Hall.

A public subscription was held which raised £3,000 to fund the memorial and a Memorial Committee, which included some of the most prominent Liverpool residents, was formed to direct its design and construction. The committee asked Welsh sculptor William Goscombe John to provide a number of designs for the monument. Two designs were submitted to the committee on 7 November 1902 and one of these received their unanimous approval. The preferred design was approved by the council of the Corporation of Liverpool on 1 April 1903. The stonemasons for the monument were Messrs William Kirkpatrick Ltd and the foundry for the bronze elements was A. B. Burton. The monument had been completed by 4 August 1905 and was unveiled by Field Marshal Sir George White VC on 9 September. White had commanded the British forces at the Siege of Ladysmith and in his address at the unveiling commended the regiment for their actions in that battle. The monument is unusual for one to a specific regiment, in being provided by the public rather than by the regiment itself or those associated with it.

== Description ==
The monument is formed in white stone with bronze details and statuary. The central element is a stone pedestal upon which stands a bronze statue of Britannia. Britannia stands with her right hand raised and with a spray of laurel held in her left hand. A round shield, decorated with sea horses, is strapped to her left arm. On her head Britannia wears a helmet with a ship's prow and sea horse crest. The sea horses are a reference to Britain's maritime power.

The pedestal is decorated with bronze swags in the upper portions. The front of the pedestal carries an inscription noting that the monument was erected by the officers and men of the regiment and the people of Liverpool in memory of those killed on campaign in Afghanistan (1878–80), Burma (1885–87) and South Africa (1899–1902) including those killed in action, died of wounds and died of disease. In front of the pedestal lies a bronze depiction of a number of guns and other military equipment, wreaths, palms and a union flag. In front of the equipment is the bronze-lettered inscription "Pro Patria" (Latin: "for one's country"). In front of this, on a lower step, lies a laurel wreath. The rear of the pedestal holds a bronze depiction of the regimental badge, a sphinx and a laurel twig. The front base of the monument is inscribed with the regimental motto "Nec Aspera Terrent" (Difficulties be Damned).

Two walls, arched in plan (bending towards a viewer stood in front of the monument), stretch out from the pedestal. A bronze statue of a 1685 soldier stands at the end of the left wall, while a 1902 Second Boer War soldier stands at the end of the right wall. The front face of the left wall lists the names of the 66 men of the regiment who died in the Second Anglo-Afghan War and the 110 from the Third Anglo-Burmese War. The front face of the right wall lists the 179 who died during the Second Boer War. The rear of the arched walls list regimental battle honours. The left wall lists the 18th-century honours Blenheim, Ramilles, Oudenarde, Malplaquet and Dettingen, Defence of. The rear of the right wall lists the 19th-century honours Martinique, Niagara, Delhi, Lucknow, Peiwor-Kotal and ends with Ladysmith. At the rear of the pedestal is a statue of a drummer boy at Dettingen (1743), seated on a rock beating the call to arms. Behind the drummer are banners, a cannon and a musket, the whole is rendered in bronze.

== Recent history ==
The monument received statutory protection as a listed building on 14 March 1975 and is currently categorised in grade II. The memorial is a rare example of a large-scale pre-First World War regimental monument in a public space. It remains the largest memorial in St John's Gardens.

The War Memorials Trust regards the monument as being in a "poor" condition. Its records note that the monument has suffered some damage and vandalism. They note graffiti on the stonework, missing bronze lettering and that the blade of one palm leaf has been broken. They also note that the plume from a hat in the pile of equipment, the triggers of the guns held by the soldiers and the point of one of the flag staffs behind the drummer are missing.
