= Joan Grigg =

Organiser of Kenyan maternity and nursing services

The Right Honourable The Lady Altrincham
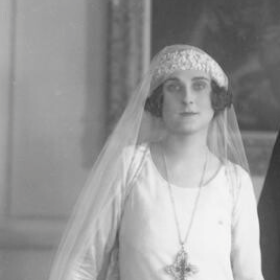
- in 1923 by Vandyk
- Born: Joan Alice Katherine Dickson-Poynder; 11 September 1897; Hartham Park, Wiltshire
- Died: 1987 (aged 89 or 90); Tormarton Court, Tormarton, Gloucestershire
- Known for: Organising nursing and midwifery in Kenya
- Spouse: Edward Grigg
- Children: 3, including John
- Father: John Dickson-Poynder, 1st Baron Islington

Joan Alice Katherine Grigg, Baroness Altrincham (née Dickson-Poynder; 11 September 1897 – 1987) was a British organiser of maternity and nursing services in Kenya. She disagreed with the Governor of Kenya (her husband) about race issues and she established medical facilities for all races.

== Life ==
Joan Alice Katherine Dickson-Poynder was born in the country house called Hartham Park near Corsam in Wiltshire. She was the only child of Ann Beauclerk Dundas and John Dickson-Poynder, 1st Baron Islington. Her father volunteered his time to a hospital and her mother took an interest in nursing. In 1910, her father became Baron Islington and Governor of New Zealand.

During the First World War she became a nurse after being one of the thousands who volunteered for the Volunteer Aid Detachment. Aged nineteen, she was first based in Canterbury where she worked in a military hospital before she moved out to work in a hospital in Rouen in 1917. She went on to work with the French army before the war ended.

In 1923, she married Liberal Member of Parliament (MP) Edward Grigg. In 1925, her husband was made Governor of Kenya. He was tasked with merging Uganda, Tanganyika and Kenya but ended up creating fine buildings and a steady administration that attracted investment. He believed that Africans were not ready to rule themselves and his administration took little interest in creating hospitals or health care.

Like her parents and building on her wartime experience she took an interest in hospitals in Kenya (and this reflected well on her husband). She disagreed with her husband's views on white minority rule. She found the social life at Government House in Nairobi dull although she was befriended by Karen Blixen who was then a Danish farmer. Blixen later wrote Out of Africa, about her time in Kenya.

She created the Lady Grigg Welfare League and the Lady Grigg Maternity' in 1926 (or 1927) in Pumwani. She intended to create nursing and midwifery services to Kenyans irrespective of their race. That same year the league funded a welfare home for Arab and African children in Mombasa. The facility in Pumwani in Nairobi was also known as the African Maternity and Child Welfare Hospital and Training Centre. She wrote a letter to The Times which attracted donations but many were earmarked for European hospitals. The league had created hostel facilities for trainee nurses for Europeans, but had also established welfare facilities for Indians and importantly maternity facilities for Africans. African women could have difficult and sometimes fatal births due to female circumcision which was practised at that time.

== Death and legacy ==
Grigg died, aged 89 or 90, in Tormarton Court, Tormarton, Gloucestershire. The Maternity unit she founded in Nairobi is now much expanded and is called the Pumwani Maternity Hospital.

== Private life ==
She married the politician Edward Grigg.

They had three children:

- John Edward Poynder Grigg, 2nd Baron Altrincham (15 April 1924 – 31 December 2001), journalist and author
- Hon. Annabel Desirée Grigg (b. 19 November 1931),
- Anthony Ulrick David Dundas Grigg, 3rd Baron Altrincham (b. 12 January 1934)
