= Sebastian Grigg, 4th Baron Altrincham =

British peer

The Right Honourable The Lord Altrincham
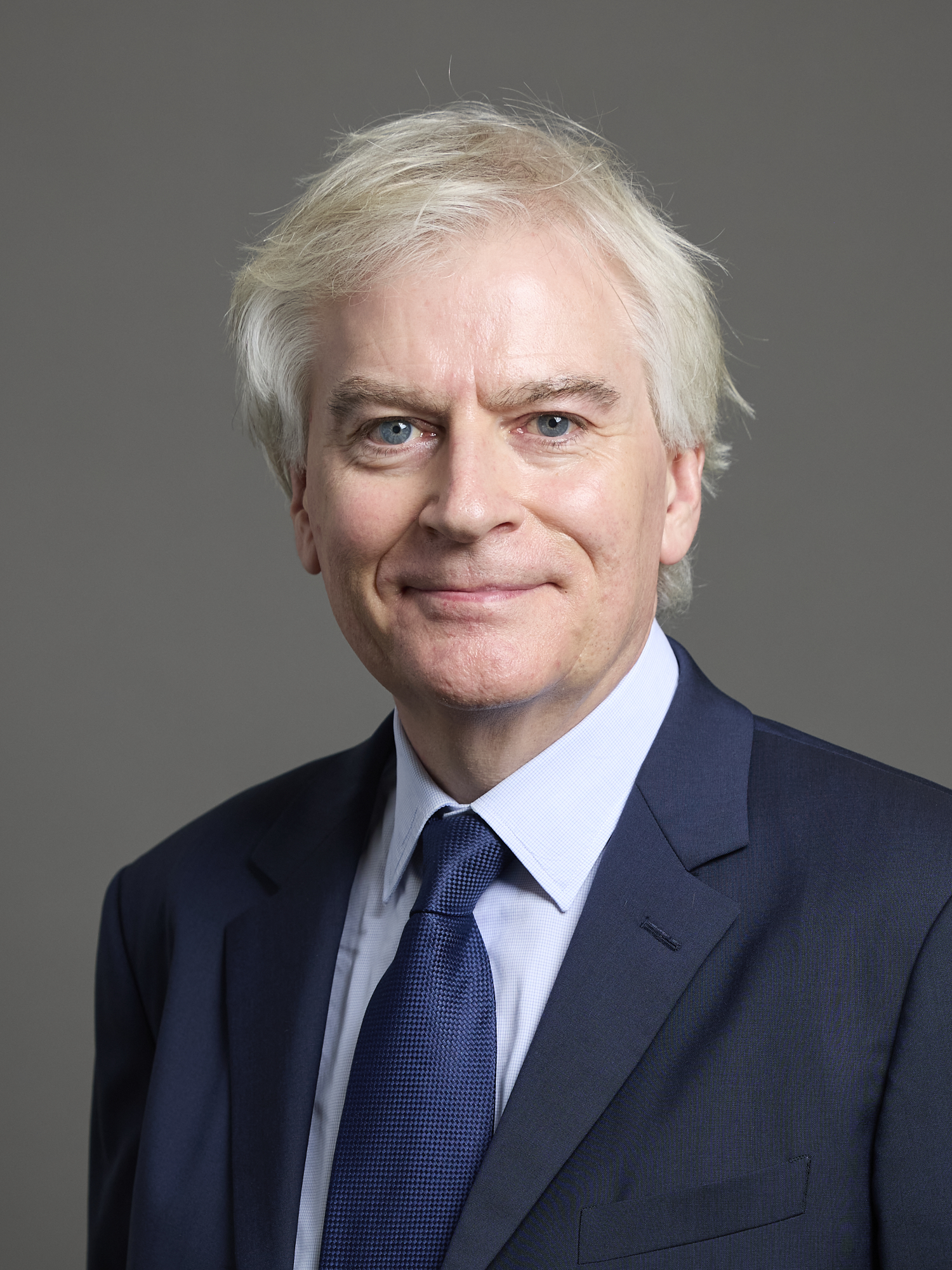
- Official portrait, 2026

Shadow Minister for the Treasury
- In office 1 September 2024 – 29 April 2026
- Leader: Rishi Sunak; Kemi Badenoch
- Preceded by: The Lord Livermore

Member of the House of Lords
- Lord Temporal
- Life peerage 2 June 2026
- Elected Hereditary Peer; 23 June 2021 – 29 April 2026
- By-election: 2021
- Preceded by: The 3rd Baron Selsdon
- Succeeded by: Seat abolished

Personal details
- Born: Edward Sebastian Grigg; 18 December 1965 (age 60)
- Party: Conservative
- Spouse: Rachel Kelly
- Children: 5
- Education: Oriel College, Oxford

Edward Sebastian Grigg, 4th Baron Altrincham, Baron Altrincham of Islington (born 18 December 1965), is a British hereditary peer and Conservative member of the House of Lords.

== Early life ==
Grigg was educated at Oriel College, Oxford, where he was a member of the 1987 Bullingdon Club.

== Business career ==
After working at Goldman Sachs, Grigg became head of investment banking at Credit Suisse UK in 2007. He advised HM Treasury on the recapitalisations of the Royal Bank of Scotland, HBOS and Lloyds in October 2008 as part of a Credit Suisse team working from a makeshift office in one of the Treasury's corridors. He left Credit Suisse in 2016. He was a non-executive director of The Co-operative Bank from 2021 to 2025, representing shareholders, including Silverpoint and Goldentree, through to the sale of The Co-operative Bank to the Coventry Building Society in 2025.

== Political career ==
Grigg unsuccessfully stood for the House of Commons for the Heywood and Middleton constituency in Manchester in 1997, aged 31, while working as a junior banker at Goldman Sachs. This period was described in his wife Rachel Kelly's memoir about her experience of depression and recovery. He wrote the afterword to Black Rainbow describing her depression and his experience of being a Parliamentary candidate while working for Goldman Sachs and this was subsequently republished in the Evening Standard in 2014 including these lines:

This is the story of how we muddled through together. We tried to combine a career at Goldman Sachs with a career at The Times. We tried working mother. We tried stay-at-home mother. We tried the choices. We found that there is no road map, no safe harbour, no safe roles. But we also found extraordinary joy, extraordinary friendships and the blessing of children.

He took the oath to enter the House of Lords as Lord Altrincham on 1 July 2021. He made his maiden speech on 13 October 2021, talking about his wife's depression, working as a banker, standing for Parliament in 1997 and his family's history. He was a member of the House of Lords Select Committee on the Integration of Primary and Community Care, which published the report "Patients at the centre: integrating primary and community care" in December 2023. He was a member of the House of Lords Industry and Regulators Committee and the House of Lords Finance Bill Sub Committee. He became a Shadow Treasury Minister in September 2024.

== Peerage ==
Grigg is the grandson of Edward Grigg, who became the first Baron Altrincham in 1945. He had been Governor of Kenya, Member of Parliament for the Altrincham constituency in Cheshire from 1933 to 1945 and then British Government Minister-Resident for the Middle East based in Cairo in 1944 following the assassination of Lord Moyne. On his death in 1955, the title passed to the writer and journalist John Grigg whose life as Lord Altrincham was partly recreated in Season 2 of The Crown. The Peerage Act 1963 made it possible to disclaim a title for life. The first title to be disclaimed was Viscount Stansgate, the politician Tony Benn. The second title to be disclaimed under the Act was Lord Altrincham.

The Altrincham title passed to John Grigg's brother Anthony Grigg in 2001 and then to his son Edward Sebastian Grigg in 2020. The current Lord Altrincham was then elected as a hereditary peer to the House of Lords in June 2021 in a Conservative hereditary peers' by-election. Viscount Stansgate was elected as a member of the House of Lords in July 2021 in a Labour hereditary peers' by-election, thereby returning the first and second titles disclaimed in 1963 to the House of Lords. His oldest son, the Hon. Edward Grigg, a barrister at 4 New Square, is heir to the Altrincham title.

The House of Lords (Hereditary Peers) Act 2026 came into force on 29 April 2026 at the end of the parliamentary session. The Act removed the right of the remaining elected hereditary peers to sit in the House of Lords. On 12 May 2026 Life Peerages were awarded to 26 former elected hereditary peers . Lord Altrincham was nominated by the Leader of the Conservative Party. Lord Altrincham was created Baron Altrincham of Islington, of Holland Park in the Royal Borough of Kensington and Chelsea, on 2 June 2026 and resumed his seat in the House of Lords that same day.[18]Viscount Stansgate was also given a Life Peerage, nominated by the Leader of the Labour Party .

Peerage of the United Kingdom
Preceded by Anthony Grigg	Baron Altrincham; 2020–present	Incumbent; Heir apparent: Hon. Edward Grigg
Parliament of the United Kingdom
Preceded by The Lord Selsdon	Elected hereditary peer to the House of Lords under the House of Lords Act 1999; 2021–2026	Position abolished under the House of Lords (Hereditary Peers) Act 2026
