= William Wiggins =

British Liberal politician and cotton manufacturer

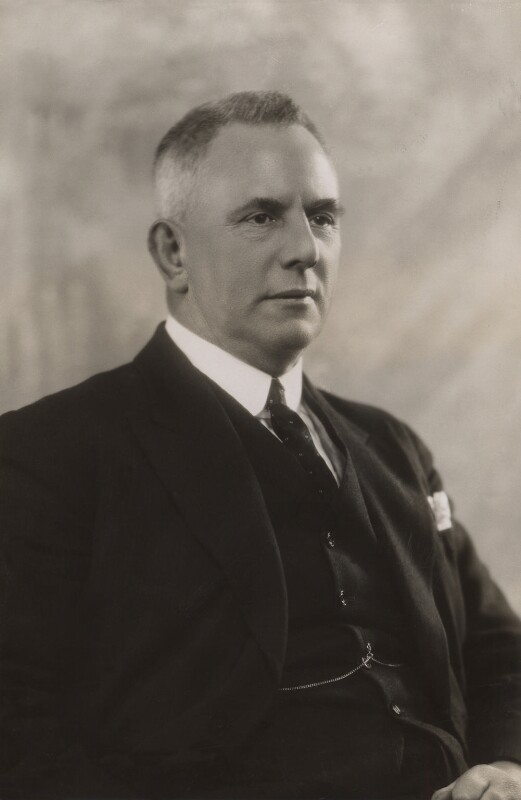
- Wiggins in 1928

Member of Parliament for Oldham
- In office 1925–1929 Serving with Duff Cooper
- Preceded by: Edward Grigg; Duff Cooper
- Succeeded by: Gordon Lang; James Wilson

Personal details
- Born: 4 August 1870 Burnham-on-Sea, Somerset, England
- Died: 4 October 1950 (aged 80)
- Party: Liberal
- Spouses: Flora Coleman; Elizabeth Hayhurst
- Occupation: Cotton manufacturer

William Martin Wiggins (4 August 1870 – 4 October 1950) was a British Liberal politician and cotton manufacturer.

== Birth and private life ==
Wiggins was born in Burnham-on-Sea in Somerset, the son of the Reverend William Wiggins. He was educated privately. In 1896 he married Flora Coleman of Oldham in Lancashire. He was married for a second time in 1917 to Elizabeth Hayhurst of Hellifield in North Yorkshire.

== Public and business life in Lancashire ==
In 1906 Wiggins was appointed a Justice of the Peace for the Municipal Borough of Middleton, in Lancashire. Between 1914 and 1919 he was Mayor of Middleton, and was made an honorary Freeman of the Borough in 1919. In business Wiggins was a successful cotton manufacturer, a director of several spinning companies and was at one time president of the Federation of Master Cotton Spinners Associations and president of International Federation of Cotton Spinners and Manufacturers. He was also sometime president of the British Employers’ Confederation.

Wiggins promoted education in Middleton as it was clear that the town needed a much larger school than the existing Grammar School in Boarshaw, a district in the north of the town. Together with his friend Frederick Bagot who was to become editor of the local paper in Middleton, Wiggins initiated a campaign that ended with Brasenose College, Oxford (which had run the school under the terms laid down by Queen Elizabeth I) handing over many thousands of pounds, which helped towards the building of the new school in Durnford Street, when the administration became vested in the Lancashire County Council.

== Member of Parliament and the Oldham by-election, 1925 ==
Wiggins entered Parliament at a by-election in 1925 at Oldham. The election was occasioned by the appointment of the sitting Liberal MP, Edward Grigg (a former private secretary to David Lloyd George) to the governorship of Kenya. Oldham was a two-member seat at the time. Wiggins had fought beside Grigg at the 1923 general election but the second seat had been retained by William Tout the Labour candidate and MP since 1922 and private secretary to the Minister of Labour. In the 1924 general election Tout lost his seat to the Tory candidate Duff Cooper.

Wiggins, described as a staunch free-trader and robust Radical was selected as Liberal candidate and Tout was invited to stand again by the Oldham Trades and Labour Council. The Tories were in a difficult spot concerning a possible candidate for the by-election. Oldham Liberals had decided not to put up a second candidate at the 1924 general election, ensuring Duff Cooper was elected on the back of Liberal votes. The local parties also had a written agreement not to engage in three-cornered fights at municipal elections and putting up a by-election candidate put these arrangements at risk. In addition, Wiggins proposed to make the Budget, free-trade and the question of duties on silk products the principal issue of the election. He was expected to receive support from many Conservative supporters of free-trade who were also opposed to silk and artificial silk duties. In the event the Tories chose not to put up a candidate but Wiggins emphatically denied that any pact had been arranged between the parties. It just seems that the Conservatives did not wish to risk handing the seat back to Labour and ruining their local government arrangements with the Liberals. The Liberals played to this with Conservative minded voters in the campaign, with Lloyd George declaring at a speech in Oldham that the issue was about socialism and raising the spectre of Tout's record of supporting the state ownership of many industries. The free-trade issue was also a continuing feature of the election with Sir Alfred Mond, still at that time a Liberal but to defect to the Tories in 1926, delivering a speech on the subject and on 13 June in the Committee on the Finance Bill, the silk duties were carried, providing ammunition for Wiggins’ campaign.

Wiggins won the by-election with a majority of 4,623 over Tout in a poll where turnout was 66% and in his acceptance speech freely acknowledged the wholehearted support of Liberals and Conservatives against Socialism.

== Stepping down from Parliament ==
When the Oldham Liberals decided to contest both seats at the general election of 1929, Wiggins felt this undermined the tacit understanding the party had with the Conservatives and he declined to stand for re-election. He may also have felt the winds of political change coming in Oldham and decided to jump before he was pushed as the Labour party gained both Oldham seats in the 1929 general election.

== Cotton interests ==
After he retired from Parliament, Wiggins continued to play a leading public role in representing the cotton manufacturing industry and the development of practices in the field. But apart from his fierce defence of the interests of the Lancashire cotton trade, it is sometimes difficult to find a consistent policy thread in his public utterances and recommendations.

In 1931 he headed a delegation to lobby the President of the Board of Trade, William Graham and the Secretary of State for India, William Wedgwood Benn on the prospects for the cotton trade with India. In 1934, as chairman of the special committee appointed by Federation of Master Cotton Spinners Associations he produced a report into the management and policies of the cotton trade starting from research into the problems of silver from the point of view of the Lancashire Cotton trade. His report condemned British economic policy in contracting the money supply and the demonetization of silver and praised the actions of US President Franklin D Roosevelt in taking positive government action to intervene in financial and fiscal matters. He proposed restoring international trade through rising prices, guaranteed by government action. In Rome in the spring of 1935 he represented his industry at the World Cotton Congress and presented a paper on silver in relation to monetary policy and the cotton trade of the world. On this occasion he took the opportunity to promote a free trade agenda and to attack the idea that nations could isolate themselves or attempt to practice autarky. The Congress was not however ready for all Wiggins’ solutions and he was obliged to withdraw his call for rises in the price of silver to ensure unity between the delegations and this time supported the call for the United States Board of Agriculture to intervene more robustly to counter some of the practices of American cotton manufacturers and traders.

Later in 1935, Wiggins met the prime minister of Australia, Joseph Lyons with other local businessmen in Manchester to object formally to Australia's tariff regimes against Lancashire cotton goods. In early 1936, Wiggins spoke in favour of the Cotton Spinning Bill then before Parliament saying that people needed to recognise that the days of laissez-faire were over and defended elements of state regulation in the industry to keep production up and employment in the industry high.

In 1938, against the background of the trade recession, in his capacity as chairman of the Monetary Policy Committee of his Federation, he wrote to the Times newspaper advocating a national monetary system to protect British interests against the policies of foreign governments. Then in 1939, Wiggins was a member of a deputation to the prime minister Neville Chamberlain, President of the Board of Trade Oliver Stanley and Minister of Labour, Ernest Brown to make representations about the depression in the cotton industry. The delegation called for special measures to protect the industry and give government assistance to Lancashire to help overcome the economic and social effects of the depression. They blamed the subsidies given to foreign cotton manufacturers by their governments and the tariffs and trade barriers erected by foreign governments.

It is difficult to avoid the conclusion that Wiggins was for free trade when it benefited Lancashire cotton and against it when circumstances changed.

After the War, Wiggins served as one of the employers’ representatives on the Cotton Working Party set up in October 1945 which proposed a comprehensive programme for the re-equipment and reorganisation of the industry with government help and finance but stopping short of a request for nationalisation. He died in 1950.

Parliament of the United Kingdom
Preceded by Edward Grigg and Duff Cooper	Member of Parliament for Oldham; 1925–1929; With: Duff Cooper	Succeeded by Gordon Lang and James Wilson
