= Gilzean =

Gilzean is a surname from Scotland. Notable people with the surname include:

== Footballers ==
- Alan Gilzean (1938–2018), mostly played for Dundee, Tottenham
- Ian Gilzean (born 1969), played for various clubs

== Politicians ==
- Andrew Gilzean (1877–1957), Labour Party politician
- Hugh Reid (politician) (1836–1911), Scottish journalist and politician

== Other ==
- Butch Gilzean, a character in the television series Gotham
