= 1941 Edinburgh Central by-election =

UK parliamentary by-election

The 1941 Edinburgh Central by-election was a parliamentary by-election held on 11 December 1941 for the British House of Commons constituency of Edinburgh Central in Scotland.

The seat had become vacant when the Conservative Member of Parliament (MP) James Guy had resigned from the House of Commons due to ill-health on 24 November 1941, by the procedural device of accepting the post of Steward of the Manor of Northstead. Guy had held the seat since the 1931 general election.

== Candidates ==
The Unionist Party selected as its candidate the 45-year-old Frank Watt.

The parties in the war-time Coalition Government had agreed not to contest vacancies in seats held by other coalition parties, but other by-elections had been contested by independent candidates or those from minor parties. In this case, the Independent Labour Party (ILP) fielded a candidate, Thomas Taylor, who had previously contested the Glasgow Govan seat at the 1935 general election.

== Result ==
The result was a clear victory for Watt, who won comfortably, albeit on a much reduced turnout. He held the seat until his defeat at the 1945 general election by the Labour Party candidate Andrew Gilzean.

Edinburgh Central by-election, 11 December 1941
Party	Candidate	Votes	%	±%
Unionist	Frank Watt	4,771	71.0	+17.0
Ind. Labour Party	T. Taylor	1,950	29.0	N/A
Majority		2,821	42.0	+29.4
Turnout		6,721	20.0	−44.5
Unionist hold		Swing		

== See also ==
- Edinburgh Central constituency
- Lists of United Kingdom by-elections
