= James Guy (British politician) =

British politician (1894–1972)

James Campbell Morrison Guy MC (12 June 1894 – 10 March 1972) was a Scottish Unionist Party politician.

Guy served during World War I in the Royal Marine Reserve and was awarded the Military Cross for his actions in Belgium. He was elected member of parliament (MP) for Edinburgh Central at the 1931 general election, and held the seat until his resignation in 1941 due to ill-health.

Parliament of the United Kingdom
Preceded by William Graham	Member of Parliament for Edinburgh Central; 1931–1941	Succeeded by Frank Watt
