= Hartham House =

Coordinates: 51.4476°N 2.2042°W

Hartham House was a country house at Hartham, Wiltshire, England, standing next to Hartham Park, north-west of the town of Corsham. During the Tudor and Civil War periods it was owned by the Duckett family, among whom were several members of parliament for the rotten borough of Calne.

George Jackson (1725–1822) married into the Duckett family and was described as "of Hartham House" when he was created a baronet in 1791.

The property was eventually sold to the Methuen family, who had also acquired Hartham Park. In the mid-1800s, Hartham House was demolished and only the Hartham Park house now stands.
