= Frank Watt (politician) =

Scottish politician, advocate and sheriff (1896–1971)

Francis Clifford Watt (20 July 1896 – 8 April 1971) was a Unionist Party politician, advocate and sheriff in Scotland.

He was elected as member of parliament (MP) for Edinburgh Central at a by-election in December 1941, and held the seat until his defeat at the 1945 general election by the Labour Party candidate.

He was qualified as an advocate and a Member of the Scottish Bar, and was awarded King's Counsel (KC) on 20 August 1946. He served as Sheriff of Caithness, Sutherland, Orkney & Zetland from 1952 until his transfer as Sheriff of Stirling, Dumbarton and Clackmannan in 1961. He held that position until his death in 1971.

Parliament of the United Kingdom
Preceded by James Guy	Member of Parliament for Edinburgh Central; 1941–1945	Succeeded by Andrew Gilzean
