= 1925 Oldham by-election =

UK parliamentary by-election

The 1925 Oldham by-election was a by-election held on 24 June 1925 for the UK House of Commons constituency of Oldham. Oldham was at that time a two-member constituency. The other seat was held by the Unionist Duff Cooper.

== Vacancy ==
The election was triggered by the resignation of the sitting Liberal MP, Edward Grigg, a former private secretary to David Lloyd George, on appointment to be Governor of Kenya.

== Electoral history ==
Sir Edward Grigg

General election 1924: Oldham Electorate
Party	Candidate	Votes	%	±%
Unionist	✓ Duff Cooper	37,419	31.2	
Liberal	✓ Edward Grigg	36,761	30.7	
Labour	William John Tout	23,623	19.7	
Labour	James Wilson	22,081	18.4	
Majority		13,796	11.5	N/A
Turnout		119,884		
Liberal hold		Swing		
Unionist gain from Labour		Swing		

== Candidates ==
=== Liberals ===
The Liberals selected William Wiggins, a 54-year-old cotton manufacturer and former Mayor of Middleton in Lancashire as their candidate. Wiggins had previously contested Oldham as a Liberal. He fought the 1923 general election alongside Grigg but came third and was not elected.

=== Labour ===
Labour were keen to fight the by-election. They had held one of the Oldham seats from 1922 to 1924 when their MP, William Tout, lost to Duff Cooper and they re-selected Tout for the by-election contest.

=== Unionists ===
At the 1924 general election the Labour Party had for the first time stood two candidates in Oldham. The response from Unionists and the Liberals was to put up only one candidate each to avoid splitting the vote against what was widely seen as a common socialist enemy. Edward Grigg openly allied with the Unionists in what has been described as a 'crusade against Labour'. The Unionists therefore had to decide whether to chance splitting the anti-Labour vote at the by-election by running their own candidate in opposition to Wiggins and they chose not to run the risk .

=== Unionist-Liberal pact? ===
The Liberals and the Unionists insisted that no formal pact existed between them to stand only one candidate from each party in the two-member Oldham seat. But there clearly was a tacit understanding between them. In deciding not to run a candidate at the by-election, the Oldham Unionists explained that " ... in view of the attitude adopted by our party at the last election, we do not propose to nominate candidate at the forthcoming [by]-election ... " There was a formal, written, arrangement between the parties concerning the standing of rival candidates in local elections and it is evident that Grigg and Cooper received a large measure of support from each other's core supporters.

When Wiggins' nomination papers were submitted it was noted that all his sponsors were known Liberals. They included Father Ivory of St Mary's Roman Catholic Church and a number of Irish assenters. The Catholic community remained a strong source of support for the Liberal Party throughout this campaign. They were said to be susceptible to appeals against socialism because of the dangers inherent under a socialist regime to special religious interests. The Liberals made use of a statement by Cardinal Bourne condemning class warfare in their campaign literature.

At this stage the Unionists were careful not to be formally associated with Wiggins' nomination or to say publicly how they would advise their supporters to vote but leading local Unionists were making no secret of their belief that normally Unionist voters would, in the circumstances of this by-election, support Wiggins as the anti-socialist candidate. Once the election was under way however the Unionists did issue a manifesto urging their supporters to give their unstinting support to the Liberal candidate.

== Issues ==
=== Wiggins ===
Wiggins said before the election writ was issued that he wished to make finance, particularly the government's duties on silk, a central point of his campaign. This was consistent with his declared position as a Free Trader but was also designed to help the Oldham Unionist Association with their decision on whether to run a candidate or not. Like Wiggins, many local Unionists were prominent in the cotton trade and were against having to pay duties on silk and artificial silk. He also told the Oldham Liberals that he would vote against any proposed expansion of the Safeguarding of Industries Act another pledge which he knew would find support amongst both traditional Liberals and free trade Unionists.

For Wiggins however, the essential battleground of the election was the struggle between what he and the Unionists regarded as Constitutional government and socialism. Wiggins argued that Tout believed in the nationalisation of railways, mines and land, policies which went far beyond any Liberal approach and which amounted to socialism. David Lloyd George speaking in support of Wiggins at Oldham on 20 June 1925 said that socialism was the plain issue in the election. He pointed out that when in Parliament, Tout had voted for the nationalisation of all mills, factories and every shop of every description, including the co-operative stores. Now he had added land, mines and railways. The issue for Oldham, said Lloyd George, was whether they were in favour of taking all private property and the means of production and distribution and running it as a great department of state.

=== Tout ===
Tout's job as an opposition candidate was to attack the government of Stanley Baldwin, as he did for example on the issue of the Gold Standard and to point out to the electorate the inconsistency in Wiggins' position as a Liberal fighting side by side with the Unionist Party yet seeking to go into opposition if elected. There was a concerted effort by Tout and other Labour politicians supporting him to make clear the contradictions in Wiggins' position as a Free Trader reliant on the votes of supporters of a Unionist government which generally favoured tariff reform. They did their best to make Wiggins' honesty and sincerity an election issue. Labour also urged working class voters to support the industrial and economic policies of the party to bring about positive and material improvements in their working conditions and social surroundings.

== Party expectations ==
The Liberals would have hoped that the 36,761 votes polled by Grigg in 1924 would pass on to Wiggins in a two-party contest with Labour. Tout's poll of 23,623 in 1924 would be unlikely to seriously challenge the Liberals. The notional Liberal v Labour result in 1924, in terms of a percentage poll was Liberal 60.9 and Labour 39.1.

== Result ==
The result was a Liberal hold but by a reduced majority over that obtained at the previous general election. The turn out was 66% as opposed to 83% in 1924. Compared to the notional 1924 percentage, this result was a good one for the Labour Party;

Oldham by-election, 1925
Party	Candidate	Votes	%	±%
Liberal	William Wiggins	26,325	54.8	+24.1
Labour	William John Tout	21,702	45.2	+14.5
Majority		4,623	9.6	
Turnout		48,027		
Liberal hold		Swing	-6.1	

== See also ==
- 1899 Oldham by-election
