= Marion Macleod =

British microbiologist

- Born: Newcastle upon Tyne
- Died: 2017 (aged 86)
- Known for: Microbiology and medical sociology

Dr. Marion Macleod (died 2017) was a British microbiologist and medical sociologist.

== Early life ==
Marion Macleod (née Fairman) was born in Newcastle upon Tyne to Roland and Rhoda Fairman (née Finch), a coach painter and cleaner respectively. At the start of the second world war, she was evacuated to Berwick-upon-Tweed and then Shap in Cumberland. She returned to Newcastle and at age 16 left school and started working as a laboratory technician in a bacteriology lab in Newcastle University. She finished her school in evening classes and won a scholarship to attend university.

== Education and career ==
After graduation from Durham University with a double first degree in botany and bacteriology in 1952, she began a job as a post assistant lecturer at Glasgow University and completed her PhD in 1955.

In 1956 Macleod studied bacterial cytology at Harvard Medical School as a Harkness Fellow, and then from 1957 to 1958 she studied virology at the California Institute of Technology. While in the US, she met Norman Macleod, another Harkness Fellow, and in 1959 they married. They had three children. Following a break in her career to raise children, she returned as a part-time lecturer at Napier College, Edinburgh.

In the 1983 general election she stood as the Social Democratic Party (SDP) candidate in Edinburgh Central, where she came third. Macleod completed a second PhD on medical sociology in 1986 from Edinburgh University, and then worked as a lecturer at Queen Margaret College in medical sociology.
