= Charles Edward Price =

Scottish biscuit manufacturer and politician

Charles Price, circa 1906

Charles Edward Price (1857 – 7 July 1934) was a Scottish biscuit manufacturer who served as a politician in later life. He served as Liberal Member of Parliament (MP) for Edinburgh Central from 1906 to 1918.

Price began his career as a salesman for Cadbury.

In 1875 he joined with the established Edinburgh biscuit factory at the head of Leith Walk belonging to Robert McVitie (1809–1883) to create the company McVitie & Price.

In 1888 they moved to huge new premises at the St Andrews Biscuit Works on Robertson Avenue in the Gorgie district of south-west Edinburgh. In 1892 the company began to produce their famous Digestive biscuits.

In 1900 he was living at 18 Westhall Gardens in Edinburgh. Price retired from active involvement in 1901, being replaced by Alexander Grant (1864–1937) but continued in a consultative role.

In 1902 the company opened a huge new factory in Harlesden in North London and Price seems to have moved to London at that time. During the First World War the company won the government contract for creating the hugely widespread (if perhaps unpopular) "iron ration" biscuits, opening further new premises in Manchester to meet this demand. In 1925 the hugely popular Chocolate Digestive was added to their range, and the Jaffa cake in 1927.

In 1928 he was elected a Fellow of the Royal Society of Edinburgh. His proposers were Sir James Alfred Ewing, Sir Harold Stiles, Sir Thomas Hudson Beare and Ralph Allan Sampson.

In 1948 his company merged with Macfarlane Lang to create United Biscuits.

His photograph (aged 70) by Walter Stoneman is held in the National Portrait Gallery, London.

Parliament of the United Kingdom
Preceded by George Mackenzie Brown	Member of Parliament for Edinburgh Central; 1906–1918	Succeeded by William Graham
