= Tom Oswald =

British politician (1904–1990)

Thomas Oswald (1 May 1904 – 23 October 1990) was a Labour Member of Parliament in the United Kingdom. He represented Edinburgh Central from 1951 until he retired at the February 1974 general election.

== Life ==
His parents were John Oswald and Agnes Love, of Leith, where he was born in 1904. His father was also born in Leith, in 1869, but the family came from Fife. His grandfather Thomas Oswald (1835–1921) was born there (parish of Kettle) as was his grandmother Rachael Oswald, née Crawford (Collessie). Great-grandfather James Oswald was born in May 1813, in Kininmonth in the parish of Ceres, Fife. His father, John Oswald, was a dockyard worker.

Thomas Oswald was educated at Yardheads and Bonnington Road elementary schools in Leith. On leaving school, he worked as a shop assistant, painter, shipyard worker and tram driver. He was later to make his maiden speech in the House of Commons on the subject of public transport in Scotland, in July 1952, a subject in which he was recognised as an expert.

He was married in 1933 to Colina MacAskill MacAlpin (1903–1990), of Ballachullish, Argyll, daughter of Archibald MacAlpin and Margaret MacAskill. They had three sons and one daughter.

He became a member and, in 1933, an official of the Transport and General Workers Union, which, as well as representing the interests of transport workers, was affiliated to the Labour Party, which Tom Oswald had joined in 1921. From 1941 – 1969 he was head of the Scottish Region of the Transport and General Workers Union (Trade Group Secretary, Scottish Region) and during most of this time he was also an M.P. sponsored and supported by the TGWU.

He stood unsuccessfully for Labour in the parliamentary seat of West Aberdeenshire in the General Election of 1950, achieving 2nd place with 23% of the vote. However, next year he was elected for Edinburgh Central in the General Election of 1951, with 52% of the vote, succeeding the Labour MP Andrew Gilzean. He held this seat for 23 years until the General Election of February 1974, when he was succeeded by the future Foreign Minister Robin Cook. Never a particularly safe seat, his majority dropped to 617 in 1959. Apart from his last election in 1970, he was always in a two-way fight with the Conservatives (also known as Unionists in Scotland).

Primarily a backbencher during this time, his only term in office was as Parliamentary Private Secretary to the Secretary of State for Scotland in 1967–1970, during the Wilson government.

He was involved in the British Aluminium company's hydro-electric projects at Kinlochleven (near Ben Nevis) and at Foyers (on the south-east shore of Loch Ness) in the 1930s. With this knowledge he was the Chairman of the Select Committee on the North Wales Hydro Electric Power Bill (now Act) of 1973. From 1956 to 1966 he was Secretary and Treasurer of the Scottish Parliamentary Labour Group.

After leaving Parliament he became a member and then later president of the Scottish Old Age Pensioners Association.

== Notes and references ==
Parliament of the United Kingdom
Preceded by Andrew Gilzean	Member of Parliament for Edinburgh Central; 1951 – February 1974	Succeeded by Robin Cook
