= Hartham Park =

Georgian manor house in England

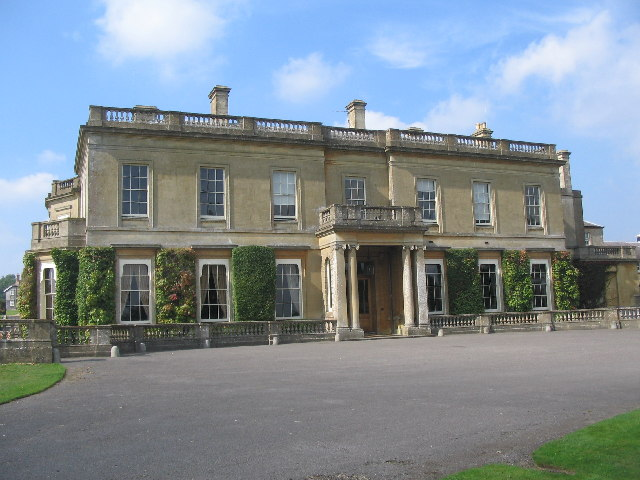
- The Hartham Park manor house, completed in 1795
- Interactive map of the Hartham Park area

General information
- Type: Manor house
- Location: Hartham, Wiltshire, England
- Coordinates: 51.4470°N 2.2013°W
- Current tenants: Business park

Website
- www.harthamparkestate.co.uk

Hartham Park is a Georgian manor house in Wiltshire, England, about 1 1/4 miles (2.0 km) north of the town of Corsham. Originally designed by James Wyatt, and set today in 50 acres (20 ha), it has within its grounds a stické tennis court. The house and nearby buildings were developed as a private business park in the late 1990s, although the house retains its Georgian facade and look.

== History ==
Hartham Park is first recorded in the Domesday Book, and was owned from the 15th century by the Goddard family. In 1790, following the death of her husband Commodore Sir William James, Chairman of the East India Company, Lady Anne James (née Goddard) decided to move from Eltham, London to Wiltshire. She commissioned architect James Wyatt to remove the existing farm house and redevelop the property. Completed in 1795, Lady James died before its hand-over. Although her house is at the centre of the current property, it is largely obscured or altered as a result of later developments.

Subsequently, leased out, in 1800 it was the birthplace of Sir Alexander Malet, 2nd Baronet.

=== Joy family ===
In 1816, the estate was purchased from the Goddard family trust by American exile Michael Joy, who through his sympathies for the British during the American War of Independence found it impossible to remain in North America. In the 1830s his son Henry Hall Joy undertook a land swap with Sir Benjamin Hobhouse, in which he took ownership of the adjacent Hartham House, which had historically been owned by the Duckett family. In his subsequent redevelopment of the estate, Hall Joy added an ice house to Hartham Park, which subsequently served as an air raid shelter during the Second World War. He also incorporated the gates of Hartham House into the entrance of Hartham park, so that the Duckett family crest still appears on the iron entrance gates. Henry Hall Joy died in 1840.

=== Poynder family ===
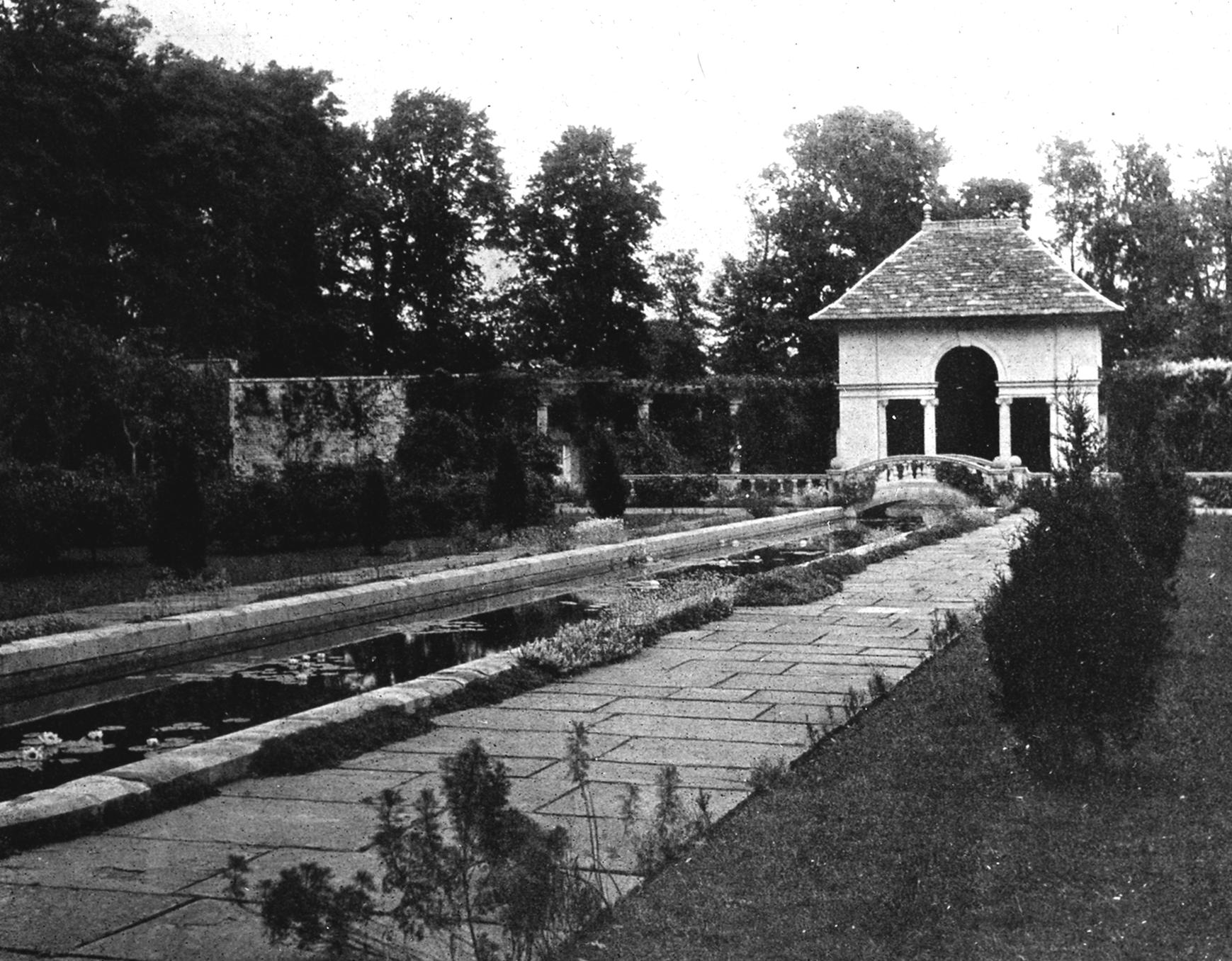
The new water garden, 1903

In the 1850s, the estate was bought by Thomas Henry Allen Poynder, and passed on his death to his brother, William Henry Poynder. On his death, the estate passed to his nephew, John Dickson Poynder, who on the death of his uncle Sir Alexander Collingwood Thomas Dickson became the sixth baronet Dickson of Hardingham Hall.

Sir John became MP for Chippenham in 1892, and a Member of London County Council from 1898 to 1904. He also served in the Second Boer War as aide-de-camp to Commander in Chief Paul Methuen, 3rd Baron Methuen, winning a DSO in 1900. He then chaired the Islington Commission. Appointed Governor of New Zealand in 1910, he was raised to the peerage as Lord Islington. After two years he returned to become first Under-Secretary of State for the Colonies and then Under Secretary of State for India.

From the start of his ownership, Baron Islington began to remodel Hartham Park. The house was remodelled and the grounds were landscaped by Harold Peto, including a Dutch water garden, subsequently largely overbuilt in a 1960s redevelopment. Hartham also became a focal point for political and recreational life in North Wiltshire, with records showing numerous stays for his friends Winston Churchill and Prince Arthur, Duke of Connaught and Strathearn, the third son of Queen Victoria who enjoyed the local game shooting.

=== Stické tennis ===
In 1904, Lord Islington commissioned the construction of a wooden stické tennis court, northwest of the house. Beginning in an artillery building at the gunnery range at Shoeburyness, Essex in 1877, courts were built throughout the British Empire, and particularly in country houses; but after World War One, no further courts were built as the sport's popularity waned. Today, Hartham Park's court is one of only three remaining, the others being at Knightshayes Court in Tiverton, Devon and at the Viceroy of India's summer palace, now the Indian Institute of Advanced Study in Shimla.

=== Second World War and after ===
Lord Islington sold Hartham Park following his purchase of Rushbrooke Hall, Suffolk in 1922. Subsequently, the Hartham Park estate was purchased by the J&W Nicholson & Co. family of gin makers, who took up residence during the Second World War. From the time of the Battle of Britain onwards, the upper floors were used as dormitories housing a hundred members of the Women's Auxiliary Air Force from the Royal Air Force's No. 10 Group, RAF Fighter Command, based at the nearby RAF Rudloe Manor.

The house was recorded as Grade II listed in 1960, and the stické tennis court as Grade II*.

Sold again in the 1960s, the house has since been used as corporate offices, initially as the headquarters of the Bath and Portland Stone company.

== Present day ==
Bought in 1997, Hartham Park was redeveloped into a business park. The main house and adjoining buildings enclose 90 sub-let serviced offices. In 2024 Hartham Park was sold again, retaining its role as a business park but introducing an on-site restaurant, the Forge and Pheasant, as well as facilitating the property's use as a wedding venue.
