= Henry de la River =

Member of the Parliament of England

Henry de la River of Tormarton in Gloucestershire was a Member (MP) of the Parliament of England for Gloucestershire in 1394.

He came of age before 1384, when he served as tax collector for Gloucestershire. He was also knighted before 1384. He inherited Tormarton not long after. He was a Justice of the Peace for Gloucestershire from 15 July 1389 to June 1390, and again from 24 December 1390 to July 1397. He was High Sheriff of Gloucestershire for 1391–1392. He served as the MP for Gloucestershire for a single term, elected in 1394. In 1398 he obtained royal confirmation of the charters granted to his ancestor in Henry III's time. He was again appointed Sheriff of Gloucestershire on 3 November 1399 and was replaced on 10 July 1400, suggesting that he may have died in office.

With his first (unknown) wife he had a son and heir, Thomas de la River, who married Isabel, Countess of Wiltshire (as widow of William le Scrope, 1st Earl of Wiltshire, who was executed in 1399), daughter of Sir Maurice Russell.

His second wife was Constance, widow first of Sir Henry Percy of Great Chalfield, Wiltshire (who died in Cologne in 1357 while on pilgrimage to Jerusalem, said to be because of the "naughty lyf" she lived with "Maister Robert Wayvile, bishoppe of Salisbury" and others); widow secondly of John Percy (neighbour of, but not closely related to, her first husband) of Little Chalfield, Wiltshire, who died in 1359; and widow thirdly of Sir Philip FitzWarin of Penleigh and Bratton, Wiltshire, who died about 1384. Constance outlived Henry de la River by about 20 years.
