= Baron Altrincham =

Title in the Peerage of the United Kingdom

Baron Altrincham, of Tormarton in the County of Gloucester, is a title in the Peerage of the United Kingdom. It was created on 1 August 1945 for the politician Edward Grigg. His son, the second Baron, was a politician, journalist, historian and writer. Soon after the passage of the Peerage Act 1963 on 31 July 1963, he disclaimed the title for life. As of 2020 the title is held by his nephew, who succeeded as 4th Baron on his father's death in that year.

== Baron Altrincham (1945) ==
- Edward William Macleay Grigg, 1st Baron Altrincham (1879–1955)
- John Edward Poynder Grigg, 2nd Baron Altrincham (1924–2001) (disclaimed 1963)
- Anthony Ulick David Dundas Grigg, 3rd Baron Altrincham (1934–2020)
- (Edward) Sebastian Grigg, 4th Baron Altrincham (born 1965).

The heir apparent is the present holder's son, the Hon. Edward Laurence Dundas de Miramont Grigg (born 1995).

=== Line of succession ===
- Edward William MacLeay Grigg, 1st Baron Altrincham (1879–1955)
  - John Edward Poynder Grigg, 2nd Baron Altrincham (1924–2001) (disclaimed 1963)
  - Anthony Ulrick David Dundas Grigg, 3rd Baron Altrincham (1934–2020)
    - (Edward) Sebastian Grigg, 4th Baron Altrincham (born 1965)
      - (1) Hon. Edward Laurence Dundas De Miramont Grigg (born 1995)
      - (2) Hon. Anthony George Seymour Sebastian Grigg (born 1997)
      - (3) Hon. Arthur John R. R. Grigg (born 2003)
    - (4) Hon. Steven Thomas Grigg (born 1969)
