= Edinburgh Central (UK Parliament constituency) =

Parliamentary constituency in the United Kingdom, 1885–2005

- Former burgh constituency for the House of Commons
- Boundary of Edinburgh Central in Scotland for the 2001 general election
- Subdivision: City of Edinburgh

1885–2005
- Seats: One
- Created from: Edinburgh
- Replaced by: Edinburgh East; Edinburgh North & Leith; Edinburgh South West; Edinburgh West

Edinburgh Central was a constituency of the House of Commons of the Parliament of the United Kingdom from 1885 to 2005. It elected one Member of Parliament (MP) by the first past the post system of election.

In 1999, the Edinburgh Central Scottish Parliament constituency was created with the same name and boundaries, and continues in use.

From 1925 until 1999, the Member of Parliament for the Westminster constituency was an ex officio member of the Board of Trustees of the National Library of Scotland. Since 1999, that role has been taken by the Member of the Scottish Parliament (MSP) for the Scottish Parliament constituency.

== Boundaries ==
1885–1918: The Municipal Wards of St. Giles, George Square, and St. Leonard, except so much as is comprised in the Edinburgh East Division (being the part to the north of a line drawn along the centres of East and West Richmond Streets).

1918–1950: The George Square, St. Giles' and St. Leonard's Municipal Wards of Edinburgh.

1950–1955: The George Square, Holyrood, and St Giles wards of the county of the city of Edinburgh.

1955–1974: The George Square, Holyrood, and St Giles wards of the county of the city of Edinburgh; and part of Gorgie-Dalry ward.

1974–1983: The George Square, Gorgie-Dalry, Holyrood, and St Giles wards of the county of the city of Edinburgh; and part of Merchiston ward.

1983–1997: The City of Edinburgh District electoral divisions of Dalry/Shandon, Haymarket/Tollcross, Murrayfield/Dean, New Town/Stockbridge, and St Giles/Holyrood.

1997–2005: The City of Edinburgh District electoral divisions of Dalry/Shandon, Fountainbridge/Tollcross, Moat/Stenhouse, Murrayfield/Dean, and St Giles/Holyrood.

The 1997–2005 boundaries covered a central portion of the City of Edinburgh council area, including Edinburgh Old Town, the West End, Holyrood and Murrayfield. The constituency was one of six covering the city council area.

At the 2005 general election, the constituency area was divided between Edinburgh East, Edinburgh North and Leith, Edinburgh South West and Edinburgh West.

== Members of Parliament ==
| Election | Member | Party |
|---|---|---|
| 1885 | John Wilson | Independent Liberal |
| 1886 | William McEwan | Liberal |
| 1900 | George Mackenzie Brown | Liberal |
| 1906 | Charles Edward Price | Liberal |
| 1918 | William Graham | Labour |
| 1931 | James Guy | Unionist |
| 1941 by-election | Frank Watt | Unionist |
| 1945 | Andrew Gilzean | Labour |
| 1951 | Thomas Oswald | Labour |
| February 1974 | Robin Cook | Labour |
| 1983 | Alex Fletcher | Conservative |
| 1987 | Alistair Darling | Labour |

== Elections ==
=== Elections in the 1880s ===
General election 1885: Edinburgh Central
| Party | Candidate | Votes | % | ±% |
|---|---|---|---|---|
| Independent Liberal | John Wilson | 2,930 | 41.9 | |
| Liberal | James Hall Renton | 1,683 | 24.1 | |
| Conservative | John Scott Napier | 1,606 | 23.0 | |
| Independent Liberal | Adam William Black | 770 | 11.0 | |
| Majority | | 1,247 | 17.8 | |
| Turnout | | 6,989 | 84.5 | |
| Registered electors | | 8,269 | | |
| Independent Liberal win (new seat) | | | | |

McEwan

General election 1886: Edinburgh Central
| Party | Candidate | Votes | % | ±% |
|---|---|---|---|---|
| Liberal | William McEwan | 3,760 | 62.7 | +38.6 |
| Liberal Unionist | John Wilson | 2,236 | 37.3 | −4.6 |
| Majority | | 1,524 | 25.4 | N/A |
| Turnout | | 5,996 | 72.5 | −12.0 |
| Registered electors | | 8,269 | | |
| Liberal gain from Independent Liberal | | Swing | +21.6 | |

=== Elections in the 1890s ===
General election 1892: Edinburgh Central
| Party | Candidate | Votes | % | ±% |
|---|---|---|---|---|
| Liberal | William McEwan | 3,733 | 63.0 | +0.3 |
| Liberal Unionist | Arthur Knatchbull Connell | 1,758 | 29.7 | −7.6 |
| Scottish Trades Councils (Scottish Socialist Federation) | John Wilson | 434 | 7.3 | New |
| Majority | | 1,975 | 33.3 | +7.9 |
| Turnout | | 5,925 | 76.7 | +4.2 |
| Registered electors | | 7,725 | | |
| Liberal hold | | Swing | +4.0 | |

Note: The John Wilson who stood as a candidate in 1892 is not the same John Wilson that stood in 1885 and 1886

General election 1895: Edinburgh Central
| Party | Candidate | Votes | % | ±% |
|---|---|---|---|---|
| Liberal | William McEwan | Unopposed | | |
| Liberal hold | | | | |

=== Elections in the 1900s ===
Brown

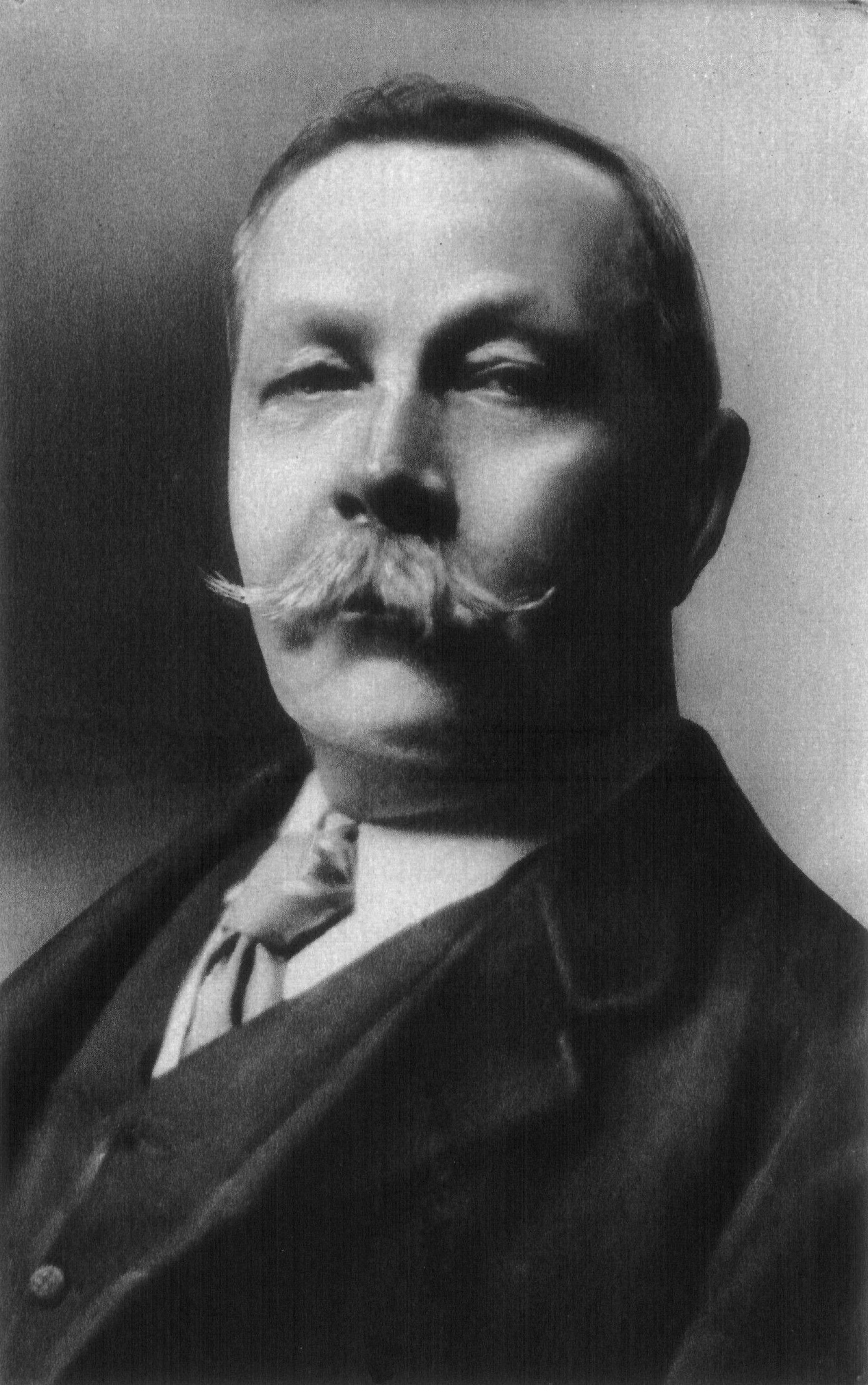
Conan Doyle

General election 1900: Edinburgh Central
| Party | Candidate | Votes | % | ±% |
|---|---|---|---|---|
| Liberal | George Mackenzie Brown | 3,028 | 55.2 | N/A |
| Liberal Unionist | Arthur Conan Doyle | 2,459 | 44.8 | N/A |
| Majority | | 569 | 10.4 | N/A |
| Turnout | | 5,487 | 71.9 | N/A |
| Registered electors | | 7,630 | | |
| Liberal hold | | Swing | N/A | |

Price

General election 1906: Edinburgh Central
| Party | Candidate | Votes | % | ±% |
|---|---|---|---|---|
| Liberal | Charles Price | 3,935 | 67.9 | +12.7 |
| Liberal Unionist | J. Douglas G. Walker | 1,857 | 32.1 | −12.7 |
| Majority | | 2,078 | 35.8 | +25.4 |
| Turnout | | 5,792 | 83.6 | +11.7 |
| Registered electors | | 6,926 | | |
| Liberal hold | | Swing | +12.7 | |

=== Elections in the 1910s ===
General election January 1910: Edinburgh Central
| Party | Candidate | Votes | % | ±% |
|---|---|---|---|---|
| Liberal | Charles Price | 3,965 | 66.7 | −1.2 |
| Liberal Unionist | David A. Scott | 1,980 | 33.3 | +1.2 |
| Majority | | 1,985 | 33.4 | −2.4 |
| Turnout | | 5,945 | 84.9 | +1.3 |
| Liberal hold | | Swing | -1.2 | |

General election December 1910: Edinburgh Central
| Party | Candidate | Votes | % | ±% |
|---|---|---|---|---|
| Liberal | Charles Price | 3,771 | 65.9 | −0.8 |
| Conservative | Geoffrey Reynolds Yonge Radcliffe | 1,947 | 34.1 | +0.8 |
| Majority | | 1,824 | 31.8 | −1.6 |
| Turnout | | 5,718 | 81.4 | −3.5 |
| Liberal hold | | Swing | -0.8 | |

General Election 1914–15:

Another General Election was required to take place before the end of 1915. The political parties had been making preparations for an election to take place and by July 1914, the following candidates had been selected;

- Liberal: Charles Price
- Unionist:
- Labour: William Graham

General election 1918: Edinburgh Central
| Party | | Candidate | Votes | % | ±% |
|---|---|---|---|---|---|
| | Labour | William Graham | 7,161 | 51.3 | New |
| C | Liberal | Joseph Dobbie | 6,797 | 48.7 | −17.2 |
| Majority | | | 364 | 2.6 | N/A |
| Turnout | | | 13,958 | 45.2 | −36.2 |
| Registered electors | | | 30,867 | | |
| | Labour gain from Liberal | | Swing | | |
C indicates candidate endorsed by the coalition government.

=== Elections in the 1920s ===
General election 1922: Edinburgh Central
| Party | Candidate | Votes | % | ±% |
|---|---|---|---|---|
| Labour | William Graham | 12,876 | 57.9 | +6.6 |
| National Liberal | George McCrae | 9,371 | 42.1 | −6.6 |
| Majority | | 3,505 | 15.8 | +13.2 |
| Turnout | | 22,247 | 71.8 | +26.6 |
| Registered electors | | 30,970 | | |
| Labour hold | | Swing | +6.6 | |

General election 1923: Edinburgh Central
| Party | Candidate | Votes | % | ±% |
|---|---|---|---|---|
| Labour | William Graham | 13,186 | 67.9 | +10.0 |
| Liberal | Thomas Lamb | 6,225 | 32.1 | −10.0 |
| Majority | | 6,961 | 35.8 | +20.0 |
| Turnout | | 19,411 | 59.7 | −12.1 |
| Registered electors | | 32,492 | | |
| Labour hold | | Swing | +10.0 | |

General election 1924: Edinburgh Central
| Party | Candidate | Votes | % | ±% |
|---|---|---|---|---|
| Labour | William Graham | 13,628 | 60.5 | −7.4 |
| Unionist | Allan Beaton | 8,897 | 39.5 | New |
| Majority | | 4,731 | 21.0 | −14.8 |
| Turnout | | 22,525 | 68.8 | +9.1 |
| Registered electors | | 32,744 | | |
| Labour hold | | Swing | | |

General election 1929: Edinburgh Central
| Party | Candidate | Votes | % | ±% |
|---|---|---|---|---|
| Labour | William Graham | 16,762 | 59.0 | −1.5 |
| Liberal | Harold Alexander | 6,745 | 23.8 | New |
| Unionist | John Mackie | 4,889 | 17.2 | −22.3 |
| Majority | | 10,017 | 35.2 | +14.2 |
| Turnout | | 28,396 | 69.3 | +0.5 |
| Registered electors | | 40,975 | | |
| Labour hold | | Swing | +10.4 | |

=== Elections in the 1930s ===
General election 1931: Edinburgh Central
| Party | Candidate | Votes | % | ±% |
|---|---|---|---|---|
| Unionist | James Guy | 17,293 | 59.3 | +42.1 |
| Labour | William Graham | 10,566 | 36.2 | −22.8 |
| Communist | Fred Douglas | 1,319 | 4.5 | New |
| Majority | | 6,727 | 23.1 | N/A |
| Turnout | | 29,178 | 74.2 | +4.9 |
| Unionist gain from Labour | | Swing | +29.1 | |

General election 1935: Edinburgh Central
| Party | Candidate | Votes | % | ±% |
|---|---|---|---|---|
| Unionist | James Guy | 12,612 | 54.0 | −5.3 |
| Labour | Andrew Gilzean | 9,659 | 41.4 | +5.2 |
| Liberal | Richard Archibald Barlow | 1,086 | 4.6 | New |
| Majority | | 2,953 | 12.6 | −11.5 |
| Turnout | | 23,357 | 64.5 | −9.7 |
| Unionist hold | | Swing | -5.2 | |

General Election 1939–40:

Another General Election was required to take place before the end of 1940. The political parties had been making preparations for an election to take place from 1939 and by the end of this year, the following candidates had been selected;

- Conservative: James Guy
- Labour: Andrew Gilzean

=== Elections in the 1940s ===
1941 Edinburgh Central by-election
| Party | Candidate | Votes | % | ±% |
|---|---|---|---|---|
| Unionist | Frank Watt | 4,771 | 71.0 | +17.0 |
| Ind. Labour Party | Thomas Taylor | 1,950 | 29.0 | N/A |
| Majority | | 2,821 | 42.0 | +29.4 |
| Turnout | | 6,721 | 20.0 | −44.5 |
| Unionist hold | | Swing | | |

General election 1945: Edinburgh Central
| Party | Candidate | Votes | % | ±% |
|---|---|---|---|---|
| Labour | Andrew Gilzean | 10,921 | 54.3 | +12.9 |
| Unionist | Frank Watt | 6,701 | 33.3 | −20.7 |
| Liberal | Norman Archibald Donald | 2,262 | 11.2 | +6.6 |
| Independent Scottish Nationalist | Hume Sleigh | 232 | 1.2 | New |
| Majority | | 4,220 | 21.0 | N/A |
| Turnout | | 20,116 | 59.7 | −4.8 |
| Labour gain from Unionist | | Swing | +16.8 | |

=== Elections in the 1950s ===
General election 1950: Edinburgh Central
| Party | Candidate | Votes | % | ±% |
|---|---|---|---|---|
| Labour | Andrew Gilzean | 16,568 | 47.92 | −6.4 |
| Unionist | Frank Watt | 13,631 | 39.43 | +6.1 |
| Liberal | Leonard Gellatly | 3,446 | 9.97 | −1.2 |
| Communist | Donald Fraser Renton | 646 | 1.87 | New |
| Independent Scottish Nationalist | Hume Sleigh | 283 | 0.82 | −0.4 |
| Majority | | 2,937 | 8.49 | −12.5 |
| Turnout | | 34,574 | 74.33 | +14.6 |
| Labour hold | | Swing | -6.2 | |

General election 1951: Edinburgh Central
| Party | Candidate | Votes | % | ±% |
|---|---|---|---|---|
| Labour | Thomas Oswald | 18,429 | 52.24 | +4.32 |
| Unionist | William J M Kean | 16,847 | 47.76 | +8.33 |
| Majority | | 1,582 | 4.48 | −4.01 |
| Turnout | | 35,276 | 76.70 | +2.37 |
| Labour hold | | Swing | -2.01 | |

General election 1955: Edinburgh Central
| Party | Candidate | Votes | % | ±% |
|---|---|---|---|---|
| Labour | Thomas Oswald | 16,735 | 51.44 | −0.80 |
| Unionist | Ralph Harris | 15,796 | 48.56 | +0.80 |
| Majority | | 939 | 2.88 | −1.60 |
| Turnout | | 32,531 | 68.85 | −7.85 |
| Labour hold | | Swing | -0.8 | |

General election 1959: Edinburgh Central
| Party | Candidate | Votes | % | ±% |
|---|---|---|---|---|
| Labour | Thomas Oswald | 15,849 | 50.99 | −0.45 |
| Unionist | Norman Wylie | 15,232 | 49.01 | +0.45 |
| Majority | | 617 | 1.98 | −0.90 |
| Turnout | | 31,081 | 72.65 | +3.80 |
| Labour hold | | Swing | -0.45 | |

=== Elections in the 1960s ===
General election 1964: Edinburgh Central
| Party | Candidate | Votes | % | ±% |
|---|---|---|---|---|
| Labour | Thomas Oswald | 14,124 | 53.9 | +2.91 |
| Unionist | Nicholas Fairbairn | 12,082 | 46.1 | −2.91 |
| Majority | | 2,042 | 7.8 | +5.82 |
| Turnout | | 26,206 | 71.62 | −1.03 |
| Labour hold | | Swing | +2.91 | |

General election 1966: Edinburgh Central
| Party | Candidate | Votes | % | ±% |
|---|---|---|---|---|
| Labour | Thomas Oswald | 13,682 | 58.6 | +4.7 |
| Conservative | Nicholas Fairbairn | 9,667 | 41.4 | −4.7 |
| Majority | | 4,015 | 17.2 | +9.4 |
| Turnout | | 23,349 | 68.86 | −2.76 |
| Labour hold | | Swing | +4.7 | |

=== Elections in the 1970s ===
General election 1970: Edinburgh Central
| Party | Candidate | Votes | % | ±% |
|---|---|---|---|---|
| Labour | Thomas Oswald | 9,561 | 46.16 | −12.44 |
| Conservative | Malcolm Rifkind | 8,000 | 38.62 | +2.78 |
| SNP | Rena Moore | 1,666 | 8.04 | New |
| Liberal | Anthony Oliver | 1,486 | 7.17 | New |
| Majority | | 1,561 | 7.54 | −9.66 |
| Turnout | | 20,713 | 66.00 | 2.86 |
| Labour hold | | Swing | -8.61 | |

General election February 1974: Edinburgh Central
| Party | Candidate | Votes | % | ±% |
|---|---|---|---|---|
| Labour | Robin Cook | 11,354 | 37.85 | −8.31 |
| Conservative | P Jones | 10,393 | 34.64 | −3.98 |
| Liberal | Christopher Scott | 4,180 | 13.93 | +6.76 |
| SNP | AW Stephen Rae | 4,074 | 13.58 | +5.54 |
| Majority | | 961 | 3.19 | −4.35 |
| Turnout | | 30,001 | 73.57 | +7.57 |
| Labour hold | | Swing | -2.17 | |

General election October 1974: Edinburgh Central
| Party | Candidate | Votes | % | ±% |
|---|---|---|---|---|
| Labour | Robin Cook | 11,129 | 40.27 | +2.42 |
| Conservative | P Jones | 7,176 | 25.97 | −8.67 |
| SNP | AW Stephen Rae | 6,866 | 24.85 | +11.27 |
| Liberal | Christopher Scott | 2,463 | 8.91 | −5.02 |
| Majority | | 3,953 | 14.30 | +11.11 |
| Turnout | | 27,634 | 67.47 | −6.10 |
| Labour hold | | Swing | +5.55 | |

General election 1979: Edinburgh Central
| Party | Candidate | Votes | % | ±% |
|---|---|---|---|---|
| Labour | Robin Cook | 12,191 | 47.8 | +7.5 |
| Conservative | David McLetchie | 7,530 | 29.5 | +3.5 |
| Liberal | Stewart Donaldson | 3,096 | 12.1 | +3.2 |
| SNP | Gavin Kennedy | 2,486 | 9.8 | −15.0 |
| SLP | Colin Boyd | 176 | 0.7 | New |
| Majority | | 4,661 | 18.3 | +4.0 |
| Turnout | | 25,479 | 67.5 | 0.0 |
| Labour hold | | Swing | +2.0 | |

=== Elections in the 1980s ===
Although the Edinburgh Central seat had been won by the Labour Party in 1979, had that election been fought on the new boundaries it was estimated that the Conservatives would have won the seat by a majority of 1,971.

General election 1983: Edinburgh Central
| Party | Candidate | Votes | % | ±% |
|---|---|---|---|---|
| Conservative | Alexander Fletcher | 14,095 | 38.0 | −2.6 |
| Labour | Richard Kerley | 11,529 | 31.1 | −4.7 |
| SDP | Dr Marion Macleod | 9,498 | 25.6 | +14.2 |
| SNP | Ronald Halliday | 1,810 | 4.9 | −6.9 |
| Communist | D.W. Carson | 119 | 0.3 | New |
| Majority | | 2,566 | 6.9 | −1.9 |
| Turnout | | 37,051 | 64.9 | |
| Conservative hold | | Swing | | |

General election 1987: Edinburgh Central
| Party | Candidate | Votes | % | ±% |
|---|---|---|---|---|
| Labour | Alistair Darling | 16,502 | 40.2 | +9.1 |
| Conservative | Alexander Fletcher | 14,240 | 34.7 | −3.3 |
| Liberal | Andrew Myles | 7,333 | 17.9 | −7.7 |
| SNP | Brian Shaw | 2,559 | 6.2 | +1.3 |
| Green | Linda Hendry | 438 | 1.1 | New |
| Majority | | 2,262 | 5.5 | N/A |
| Turnout | | 41,072 | 69.0 | +4.1 |
| Registered electors | | 59,529 | | |
| Labour gain from Conservative | | Swing | | |

=== Elections in the 1990s ===
General election 1992: Edinburgh Central
| Party | Candidate | Votes | % | ±% |
|---|---|---|---|---|
| Labour | Alistair Darling | 15,189 | 38.8 | −1.4 |
| Conservative | Paul Martin | 13,063 | 33.4 | −1.3 |
| SNP | Lynne J. Devine | 5,539 | 14.2 | +8.0 |
| Liberal Democrats | Andrew B. Myles | 4,500 | 11.5 | −6.4 |
| Green | Robin Harper | 630 | 1.6 | +0.5 |
| Liberal | Richard Wilson | 235 | 0.6 | New |
| Majority | | 2,126 | 5.4 | −0.1 |
| Turnout | | 39,156 | 69.3 | +0.3 |
| Registered electors | | 56,527 | | |
| Labour hold | | Swing | -0.1 | |

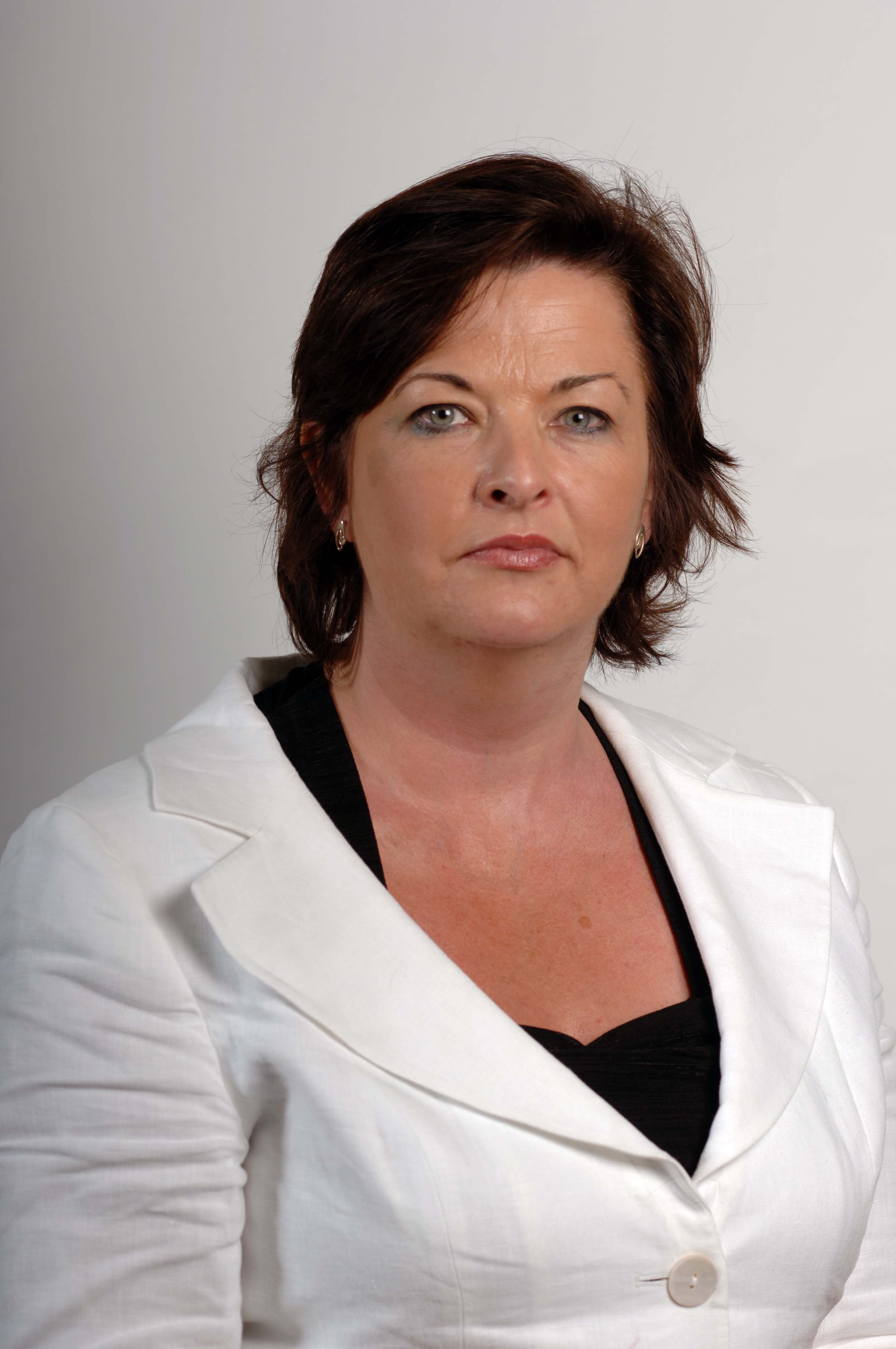
Hyslop

General election 1997: Edinburgh Central
| Party | Candidate | Votes | % | ±% |
|---|---|---|---|---|
| Labour | Alistair Darling | 20,125 | 47.1 | +8.3 |
| Conservative | Mike D.A. Scott-Hayward | 9,055 | 21.2 | −12.2 |
| SNP | Fiona Hyslop | 6,750 | 15.8 | +1.6 |
| Liberal Democrats | Karen J. Utting | 5,605 | 13.1 | +1.6 |
| Green | Linda Hendry | 607 | 1.4 | −0.2 |
| Referendum | Austin G. Skinner | 495 | 1.2 | New |
| Independent | Mark E. Benson | 98 | 0.2 | New |
| Majority | | 11,070 | 25.9 | +20.5 |
| Turnout | | 42,735 | 66.8 | −2.5 |
| Registered electors | | 63,969 | | |
| Labour hold | | Swing | +8.4 | |

=== Elections in the 2000s ===
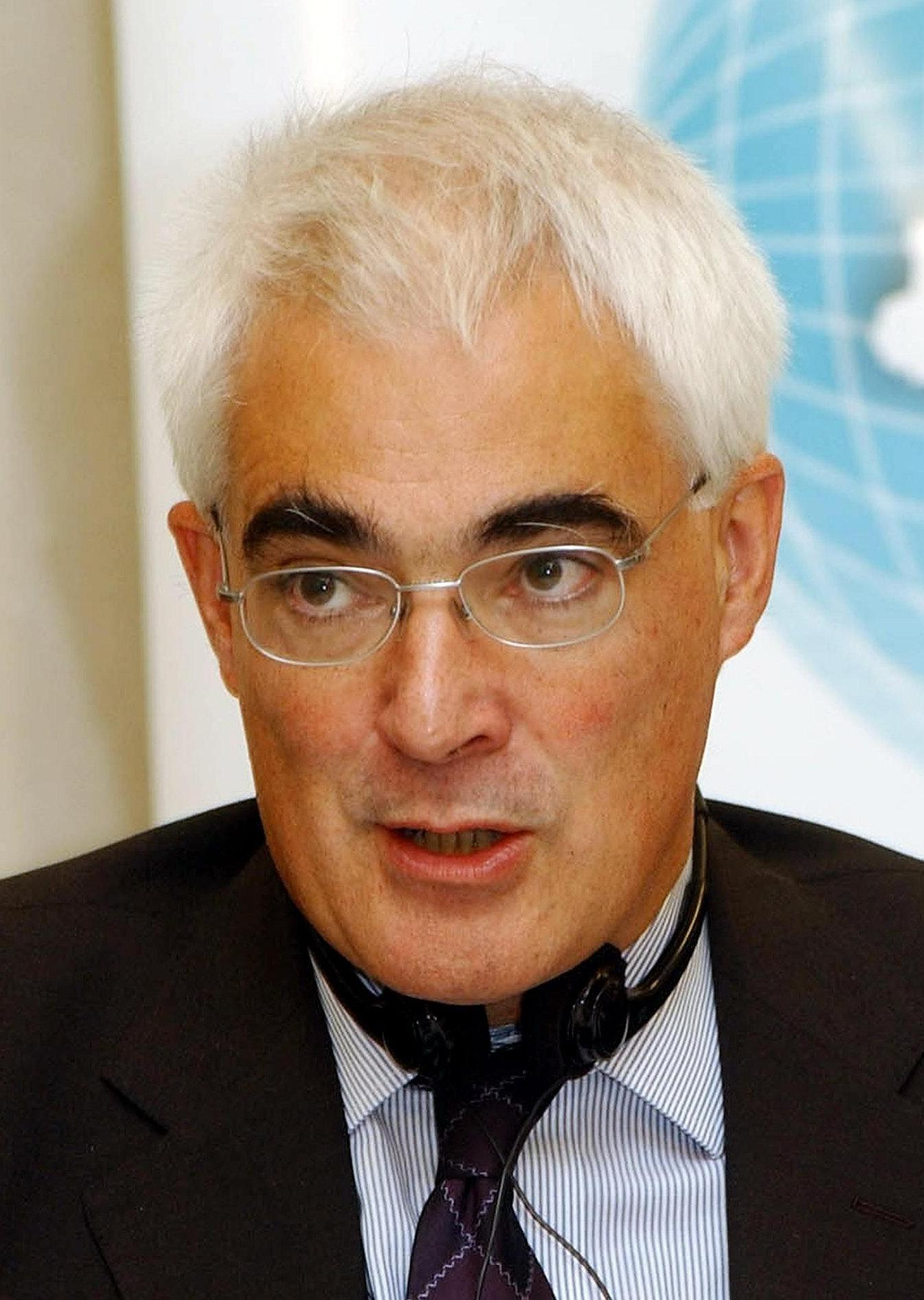
Darling

General election 2001: Edinburgh Central
| Party | Candidate | Votes | % | ±% |
|---|---|---|---|---|
| Labour | Alistair Darling | 14,495 | 42.1 | −5.0 |
| Liberal Democrats | Andrew B. Myles | 6,353 | 18.5 | +5.4 |
| Conservative | Alastair Orr | 5,643 | 16.4 | −4.8 |
| SNP | Ian McKee | 4,832 | 14.1 | −1.7 |
| Green | Graeme Farmer | 1,809 | 5.3 | +3.9 |
| Scottish Socialist | Kevin Williamson | 1,258 | 3.7 | New |
| Majority | | 8,142 | 23.6 | −2.3 |
| Turnout | | 34,390 | 52.0 | −14.8 |
| Labour hold | | Swing | −5.2 | |

== See also ==
- Politics of Edinburgh
