= John Wilson (Edinburgh MP) =

John Wilson (born 1830, year of death unknown) was a politician in Scotland. He was member of Parliament (MP) for Edinburgh Central from 1885 to 1886, having been elected as an "Independent Liberal".

He lost his seat in 1886, standing as a Liberal Unionist.

Parliament of the United Kingdom
New constituency	Member of Parliament for Edinburgh Central; 1885–1886	Succeeded by William McEwan
