= John Dickson-Poynder, 1st Baron Islington =

British politician

The Right Honourable The Lord Islington GCMG GBE DSO KStJ PC
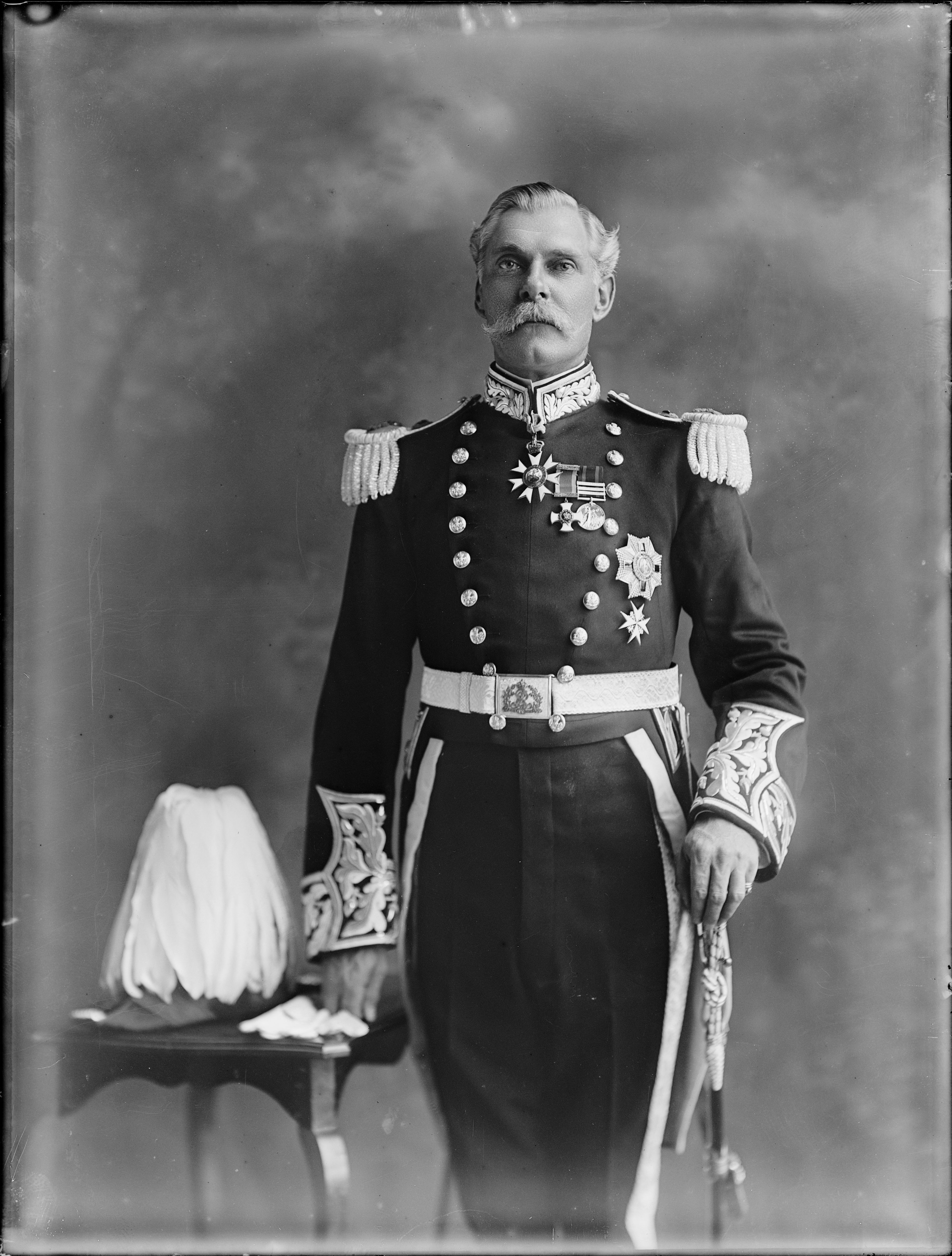
- Lord Islington in 1911.

15th Governor of New Zealand
- In office 22 June 1910 – 3 December 1912
- Monarch: George V
- Prime Minister: Joseph Ward; Thomas Mackenzie; William Massey
- Preceded by: The Lord Plunket
- Succeeded by: The Earl of Liverpool

Personal details
- Born: 31 October 1866 Isle of Wight, England
- Died: 6 December 1936 (aged 70) Hyde Park Gardens, London, England
- Spouse: Anne Dundas
- Children: Joan Grigg
- Relatives: John Grigg (grandson)

John Poynder Dickson-Poynder, 1st Baron Islington (31 October 1866 – 6 December 1936), born John Poynder Dickson and known as Sir John Poynder Dickson-Poynder from 1884 to 1910, was a British politician. He was Governor of New Zealand between 1910 and 1912.

== Early life ==
The son of Rear Admiral John Bourmaster Dickson and Sarah Matilda Dickson (née Poynder), he was born on the Isle of Wight and educated at Twyford School, Harrow and Christ Church, Oxford. In 1884, he succeeded his uncle as sixth baronet, and on succeeding to his maternal uncle's property he assumed by royal licence the additional surname of Poynder in 1888. The Poynder estates in Wiltshire included Hilmarton near Calne, and Hartham near Corsham, where Dickson-Poynder carried out alterations c. 1888.

He married Anne Beauclerk Dundas (c. 1869–1958) the daughter of James Dundas of Dundas and granddaughter of Baron Napier of Magdala. They had one daughter, Joan, who was later Joan, Lady Altrincham who organised nursing in Africa.

== Member of Parliament ==
He was appointed High Sheriff of Wiltshire in 1890. Elected Conservative Member of Parliament for the Chippenham constituency in 1892, he joined the Liberals in 1905. He was a member of London County Council from 1898 to 1904.

In late 1902 he visited British India and attended the 1903 Delhi Durbar.

== Military career ==
Dickson-Poynder was first commissioned into the volunteer battalion of the Royal Scots, but transferred to the Royal Wiltshire Yeomanry where he was promoted to captain on 7 December 1898. He volunteered for active service in the Second Boer War, and was commissioned a lieutenant in the 1st Battalion (Wiltshire Company) Imperial Yeomanry on 7 February 1900, leaving Liverpool for South Africa on the SS Cymric in early March 1900. Appointed a quartermaster during the voyage (dated 10 March 1900), he was back as a regular lieutenant in the Wiltshire company of the 1st battalion the following month. He later served on the Staff as aide-de-camp to Lord Methuen, for which he was awarded the Distinguished Service Order (DSO) on 29 November 1900. Following his resignation from the Imperial Yeomanry, he was on 5 February 1901 granted the rank of honorary lieutenant of the Army. The following year, he was promoted to major in the Royal Wiltshire Yeomanry on 31 May 1902.

== Governor of New Zealand ==
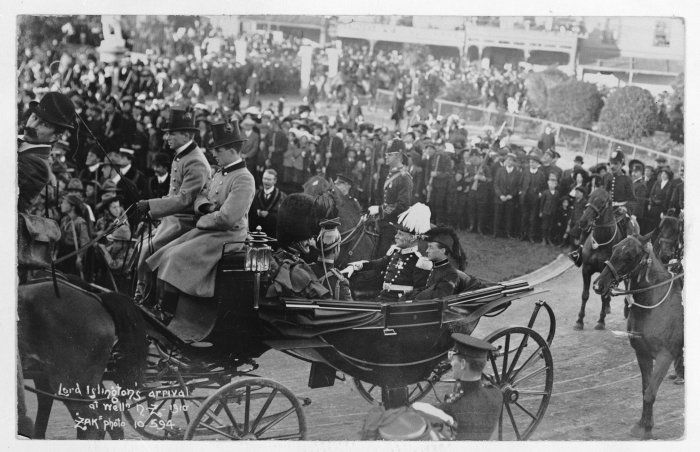
Lord Islington arriving in Wellington, 1910, in a ceremonial open carriage

In 1910 Dickson was appointed Governor of New Zealand, a post he held for two years, and on 27 April that same year, was created Baron Islington, of Islington in the County of London. He was the last Governor of New Zealand to hold the title before it was changed to Governor-General of New Zealand during the term of his successor. He was made a KCMG and Privy Counsellor in 1911, and in 1912 was appointed President of the Royal Commission on the Public Services of India, on which he served with Lord Ronaldshay, Herbert Fisher, Mr Justice Abdur Rahim, and others.

== Later career ==
Earlier on he was appointed for the Royal Commission on London Traffic in 1904, and worked on trade relations between Canada and the West Indies in 1909. A few years later he became Under-Secretary of State for the Colonies, and in 1915 he became Under-Secretary of State for India. He also chaired the Imperial Institute for eight years, and was in charge of the National Savings Committee from 1920 until 1926, when he was appointed a Knight Grand Cross of the Order of the British Empire (GBE) in the 1926 Birthday Honours, having become Knight Grand Cross of the Order of St Michael and St George (GCMG) thirteen years before.

== Death ==
Lord Islington died on 6 December 1936 aged 70 at Hyde Park Gardens, London, and was buried at Hilmarton, Wiltshire, his barony and baronetcy becoming extinct at his death. Lady Islington subsequently rented Dyrham Park in Gloucestershire, where she ran a nursery during the Second World War.

== Arms ==
Coat of arms of John Dickson-Poynder, 1st Baron Islington
Notes The arms of John Dickson-Poynder, Lord Islington consist of: Crest 1st, issuant out of the battlements of a castle argent charged with a cross-flory gules, a dexter cubit arm, vested sable, charged with a key as in the arms, cuff or, the hand proper holding a cross patee fitchee in bend also argent; 2nd, over an armed arm brandishing a falchion proper, a trident and spear in saltire or. Escutcheon Quarterly: 1st and 4th, pily counterpily of four traits or and sable, the points ending in crosses formée, two in chief and one in base, in the centre chief point a castle of the second and in base two martlets of the first, a chief azure, thereon a key erect, the wards upwards and to the sinister gold between a rose on the dexter and a fleur-de-lis on the sinister argent, Poynder; 2nd and 3rd, azure, an anchor erect encircled with an oak wreath vert between three mullets pierced or; on a chief paly of seven of the last and gules, a mural crown argent, Dickson. Supporters Dexter, an eagle proper; sinister, a lion gules; each gorged with a collar or, pendant therefrom a bezant charged with a rose gules. Motto Fortes fortuna juvat (Fortune favours the brave) Other versions

Parliament of the United Kingdom
Preceded by Lord Henry Bruce	Member of Parliament for Chippenham; 1892–1910	Succeeded by George Terrell
Government offices
Preceded by The Lord Plunket	Governor of New Zealand; 1910–1912	Succeeded by The Earl of Liverpool
Political offices
Preceded by The Lord Emmott	Under-Secretary of State for the Colonies; 1914–1915	Succeeded by Arthur Steel-Maitland
Preceded by Charles Henry Roberts	Under-Secretary of State for India; 1915–1919	Succeeded by The Lord Sinha
Peerage of the United Kingdom
New creation	Baron Islington; 1910–1936	Extinct
Baronetage of the United Kingdom
Preceded by Alexander Dickson	Baronet (of Hardingham Hall); 1884–1936	Extinct
