= George Mackenzie Brown =

Canadian-born Scottish publisher (1869-1946)

- George Mackenzie Brown
- Born: 1869
- Died: 1946 (aged 76–77)
- Occupation: politician

George Mackenzie Brown (1869 – 14 July 1946) was a Canadian-born Scottish publisher who also followed a political career. As a publisher, he produced Arthur Conan Doyle's books; as a politician, he beat him to win election to the House of Commons.

== Canadian origins ==
Brown was born in Toronto, the son of newspaper publisher Hon. George Brown who was Liberal Party Member of Parliament for Ontario South and a Father of Canadian Confederation. He was sent to the leading private school Upper Canada College, and then back to his father's native Scotland to Merchiston Castle School from where he won entry into King's College, Cambridge.

== Business life ==
On leaving Cambridge, Brown became managing trustee of Thomas Nelson and Sons, an Edinburgh-based publisher; as a publisher he was following in his father's profession. One of Nelson's most popular authors was Dr Arthur Conan Doyle. In 1901 Brown married Mary Nelson, daughter of the founder of the firm.

== Political career ==
When William McEwan announced his retirement as Liberal Member of Parliament for Edinburgh Central, Brown was chosen to fight the seat. The Unionists did not choose their candidate for the seat until much closer to the election, but when they did, Brown found himself opposed by Dr Conan Doyle, standing as a Liberal Unionist. Conan Doyle did better than any previous Unionist candidate in the constituency, but Brown was elected by a majority of 569 votes.

== Campaigns ==
Brown was regarded as unknown by the political world when elected. On 16 October 1901 he introduced to H. H. Asquith a deputation from the Scottish Temperance Legislation Board, who were campaigning for a change in the law to prohibit the sale of alcoholic liquor. He also pressed for more underground telegraphy lines between England and Scotland to aid communication.

== Retirement ==
In the autumn of 1902 Brown announced that he would not seek re-election at the next general election That October he voted for an Irish Parliamentary Party motion condemning the imprisonment of Irish MPs who were campaigning for the United Irish League and land reform. He also joined the council of the Free Trade Union when it was set up in response to the demand for Tariff Reform in 1903.

After the end of his political career, Brown moved to Taynuilt in Argyll.

Parliament of the United Kingdom
Preceded by William McEwan	Member of Parliament for Edinburgh Central; 1900 – 1906	Succeeded by Charles Edward Price
