= Rachel Kelly =

British writer, journalist and mental health advocate

The Right Honourable The Lady Altrincham
- Born: England
- Education: St Paul's Girls' School; Magdalen College, Oxford
- Occupations: Writer; journalist; mental health advocate
- Spouse: Sebastian Grigg, 4th Baron Altrincham

Rachel Kelly, Baroness Altrincham, Baroness Altrincham of Islington is a bestselling writer on mental health and wellbeing. Her books include Black Rainbow, Walking on Sunshine, The Happy Kitchen, Singing in the Rain, and You'll Never Walk Alone. The Gift of Teenagers: Connect More, Worry Less was published in May 2025 by Hachette.

== Biography ==
Kelly was raised in the vicinity of Ladbroke Grove, London, and was educated at St Paul's Girls' School before going up to Magdalen College, Oxford, as an undergraduate.

Kelly worked as a journalist for The Times newspaper in the UK from 1989 to 1999. She now writes for The New Statesman, The Guardian, and The Sunday Times. She has served as a commentator on the BBC. She is an ambassador for SANE and Rethink Mental Illness, and runs wellbeing workshops for companies, schools and universities.

== Books ==
Kelly's first book, Black Rainbow: How Words Healed Me — My Journey Through Depression, was published by Hachette in the UK, and Quercus in the US. It appeared on the Sunday Times bestseller list. This autobiographical book details her experience of depression, including a hospitalisation for suicide risk, and how poetry helped her recover. Black Rainbow was published in France by Larousse under the title La Nuit N’en Finit Pas (the title is suggestive of a 1961 French song by the British singer Petula Clark).

Her second book, Walking on Sunshine: 52 Small Steps to Happiness (the title suggestive of a 1983 song by Katrina and the Waves) was published by Short Books in 2015. It has been translated into German, Arabic, Mandarin, Polish, Korean, Turkish and Croatian, and was published in the US, Canada, and Australia. The chapters revolve around activities and ideas that have helped Kelly deal with her depression. In the New Statesman, India Bourke wrote of Walking on Sunshine that, "Drawing equally from science and art, each chapter (one for every week of the year) offers salves for both body and mind, from probiotics to poetry." The book reached #4 on Amazon's best-seller list in the UK as well as #1.

Her third book, The Happy Kitchen – Good Mood Food, with nutritionist Alice Mackintosh, was published in 2017 with Short Books in the UK. It was published as The Happiness Diet with Simon & Schuster in the US. The book discusses the role of nutrition in the treatment of depression, and includes recipes developed for that reason.

In 2019, Kelly published Singing in the Rain: 52 Practical Steps to Happiness – An Inspirational Workbook (title inspired by the Broadway song "Singing in the Rain"). In The Telegraph, James Le Fanu wrote of the work, "Since being incapacitated by a couple of severe episodes of depression in her thirties, journalist and Telegraph contributor Rachel Kelly has been canvassing fellow sufferers through her website and workshops, inviting them to report simple practical ways they have found to keep themselves on an even keel. These range through rising early to allow for a leisurely start to the day, wearing colourful, morale-boosting clothes, making a point of identifying and enjoying simple pleasures and reciting, when stressed, private prayers or mantras."

You'll Never Walk Alone: Poems for life's ups and downs (title inspired by the Rodgers and Hammerstein song "You'll Never Walk Alone") was published by Hachette in 2022.

Her latest book, The Gift of Teenagers: Connect More, Worry Less, was published in May 2025 by Hachette. Educator Sir Anthony Seldon wrote of the book, "Every parent should buy this book. It is full of practical strategies to connect with your teenager."

== Personal life ==
Kelly married Sebastian Grigg, 4th Baron Altrincham in 1993. They have five children.
