= West Littleton =

Village in Gloucestershire, England

Coordinates: 51°28′40″N 2°20′40″W

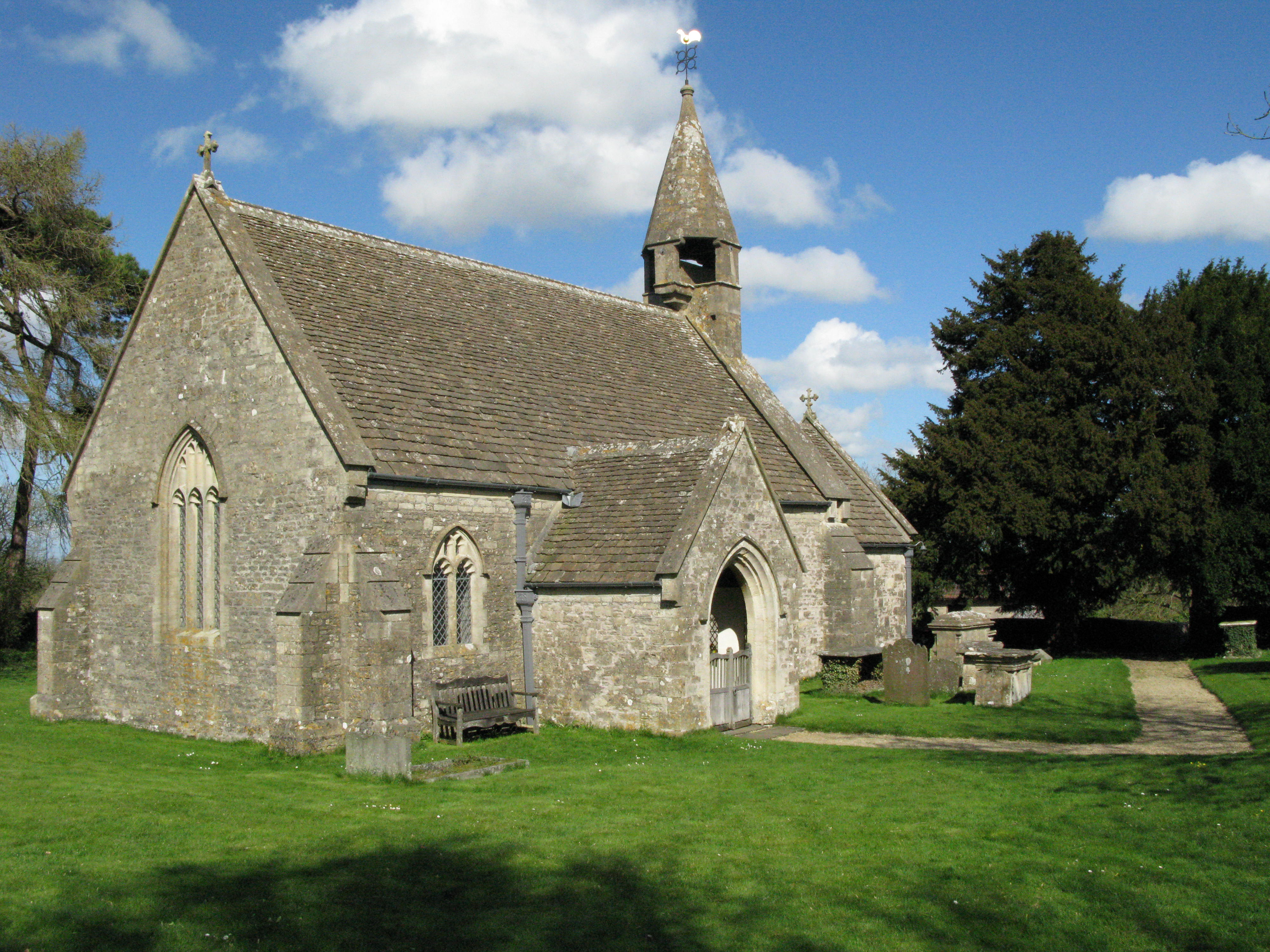
- Church of St. James, West Littleton

- Location within Gloucestershire
- Civil parish: Tormarton
- Unitary authority: South Gloucestershire
- Shire county: Gloucestershire
- Region: South West
- Country: England
- Sovereign state: United Kingdom
- Post town: Chippenham
- Postcode district: SN14
- UK Parliament: Thornbury and Yate
- Website: Tormarton Parish Council

West Littleton is a village and former civil parish, now in the parish of Tormarton, in the South Gloucestershire district, in the ceremonial county of Gloucestershire, England. It lies between the M4 and the A420. The closest amenities are in Marshfield, 1.5 miles (2.4 km) to the south-east, and the historic city of Bath is about 7 miles (11 km) to the south.

St James's Church has a 13-century bellcote but was otherwise rebuilt by T. H. Wyatt in 1855. The grounds of Dyrham Park, a stately home owned by the National Trust, are a few hundred metres west of the village on the other side of the A46.

The Old Manor House, east of the village street, is Grade II* listed. In limestone rubble with a stone tile roof, the house was begun c.1500 then altered and enlarged in the 17th century and later.

The Beaufort Hunt regularly uses the village green as a starting point for their hunts, though this has been somewhat curtailed due to the legislation banning fox hunting.

In 1931, the parish had a population of 65. On 1 April 1935, the parish was abolished and merged with Tormarton.
