= Royal Commission on the Public Services in India =

1915 colonial Indian royal commission

The Royal Commission on Public Services in India, also known as the Islington Commission, was carried out under the Chairmanship of Lord Islington.

It made the following recommendations in its report submitted in 1917:
1. Recruitment to the superior posts should be made partly in England and partly in India. However, it did not favour holding competitive exams simultaneously in England and India, which was the prime demand of the Indian Nationalists.
2. 25% of the superior posts should be filled by Indians partly by direct recruitment and partly by promotion.
3. The services under the Government of India should be categorised into Class I and Class II.
4. The principle of maintenance of efficiency should be adopted while fixing the salaries of civil servants.
5. There should be a probationary period of 2 years for direct recruits. For the ICS, it should be 3 years.
