= John Grigg =

British writer, historian and politician

John Grigg FRSL
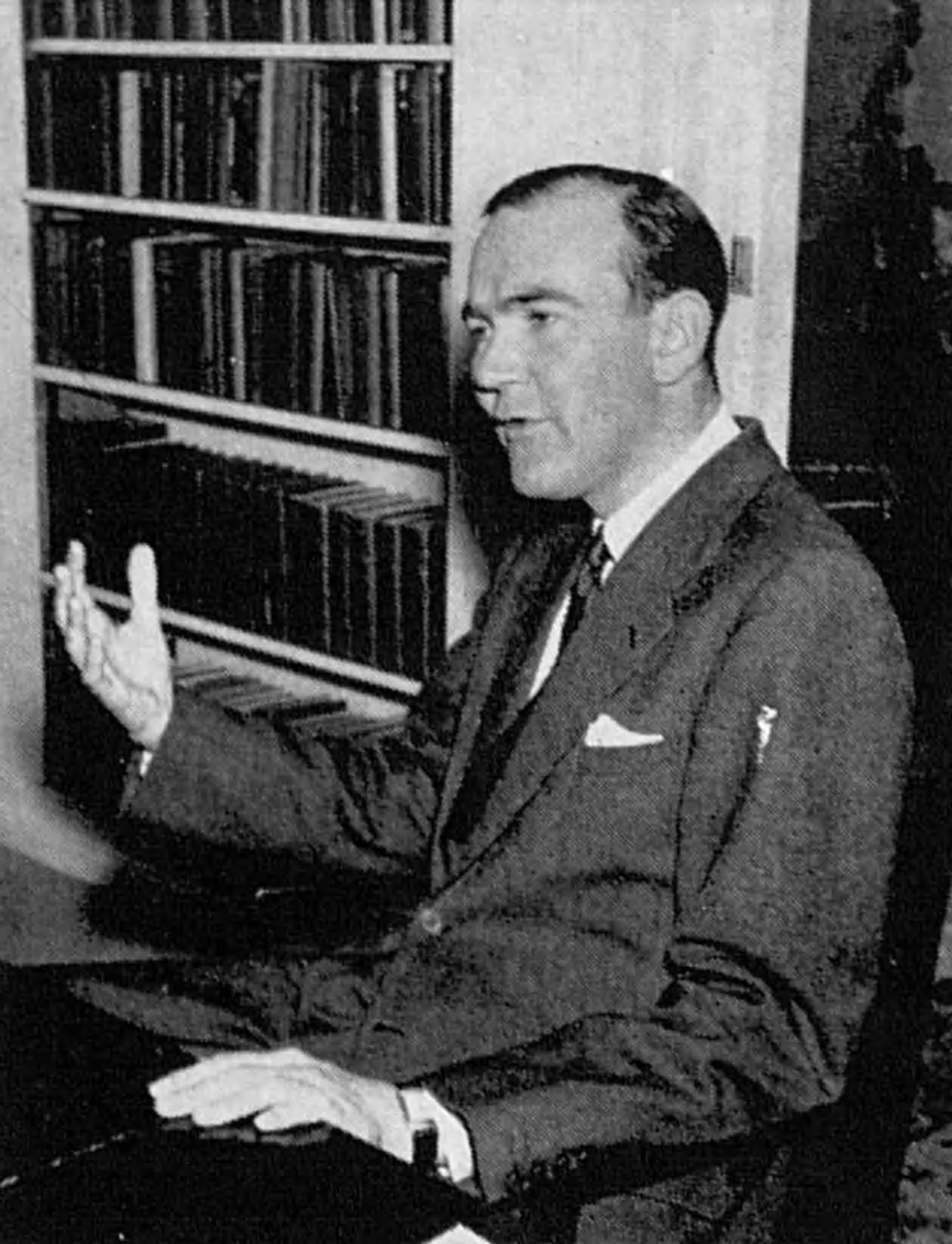
- Grigg in 1957
- Born: John Edward Poynder Grigg; 15 April 1924; London, England
- Died: 31 December 2001 (aged 77); London, England
- Education: Royal Military Academy Sandhurst; New College, Oxford
- Occupations: Historian; journalist
- Spouse: Patricia Campbell (m. 1958)
- Children: 2 (both adopted)
- Parents: Edward Grigg; Joan Grigg
- Relatives: John Dickson-Poynder (grandfather)
- Writing career
- Pen name: Lord Altrincham (1955–1963)
- Subjects: Biography; history
- Military career
- Branch: British Army
- Service years: 1943–1950
- Rank: Lieutenant
- Service number: 302263
- Unit: Grenadier Guards
- Conflicts: World War II; Western Front

John Edward Poynder Grigg FRSL (15 April 1924 – 31 December 2001) was a British writer, historian and politician. He was the 2nd Baron Altrincham from 1955 until he disclaimed that title under the Peerage Act on the day it received Royal Assent in 1963.

Grigg edited the National and English Review (1954–1960) as his father had done. He was a liberal Tory but was defeated at the 1951 and 1955 general elections. In an article for the National and English Review in August 1957, Grigg argued that Queen Elizabeth II's court was too upper-class and British, and instead advocated a more "classless" and Commonwealth court. He also likened the Queen's voice to that of "a priggish schoolgirl". He was slapped across the face by a man in public, and was attacked by the majority of the press, with a minority, including the New Statesman and Ian Gilmour's The Spectator, agreeing with some of his ideas.

As a historian, his most notable work was an uncompleted four-volume biography of Prime Minister David Lloyd George; he had reached the end of the First World War in 1918 by the time of his death.

== Early years ==
Born in Westminster, Grigg was the son of Edward Grigg, 1st Baron Altrincham, and his wife, Joan, daughter of politician John Dickson-Poynder, 1st Baron Islington. His father was a Times journalist, Liberal, and later Conservative, MP, Governor of Kenya, and member of Winston Churchill's wartime government. His mother organised nursing and midwifery in Kenya.

From Eton, Grigg joined the British Army and was commissioned as a second lieutenant into his father's regiment, the Grenadier Guards, in 1943 during the Second World War (1939–1945). While in the British Army, Grigg served as an officer of the Guard at St James's Palace and Windsor Castle, Berkshire, and saw action as a platoon commander in the 1st Battalion, Grenadier Guards, part of the 5th Guards Armoured Brigade of the Guards Armoured Division, against the German Army in France and Belgium. Towards the end of the war, he became an intelligence officer.

After the war, Grigg read Modern History at New College, Oxford. While at Oxford University, he gained a reputation for academic excellence, winning the University Gladstone Memorial Prize in 1948. In the same year, after graduating with second-class honours, Grigg joined the National Review, which was owned and edited by his father.

== Political career ==
A liberal Tory, and later a supporter of the Anti-Apartheid Movement, Grigg sought election to the House of Commons. He stood for election for the recently created Oldham West at the 1951 general election, but was defeated by the sitting member Leslie Hale. Grigg contested the seat again in the 1955 general election but was similarly unsuccessful. With his father's death in December 1955, Grigg inherited the title of Baron Altrincham, which seemingly ended any hope of his being able to stand again as a candidate. Nonetheless, Grigg refused to apply for a writ of summons to exercise his right to a seat in the House of Lords.

When Tony Benn (the Viscount Stansgate) succeeded in obtaining passage of the Peerage Act, Grigg was the second person (after Benn himself) to take advantage of the new law and disclaim his peerage. In 1997, he wrote that he was "entirely opposed to hereditary seats in Parliament" and added that in 1963 he "felt honour-bound to disclaim, though it was a bore to have to change my name again". Grigg never achieved his ambition of election to the House of Commons. In 1963, he was publicly rejected by the Conservatives and passed over for being chosen as Tory candidate for Morecambe and Lonsdale. In the 1990s Grigg told Ben Pimlott that this was because of his views on the Royal Family being viewed with disdain by the Tories. Grigg left the Conservative Party for the SDP in 1982.

== Journalism ==
As his father's health failed during the first few years of the 1950s, Grigg assumed most of the managerial and editorial duties of the renamed National and English Review. By the time of his father's death in December 1955, Grigg had taken over the editorship formally, and began to edit the Review into a publication more reflective of his views.

In 1956, Grigg attacked Anthony Eden's Conservative government for its handling of the Suez Crisis, and pressed for an immediate withdrawal of British forces from Port Said. He followed his father in championing reform of the House of Lords, although he added that, in lieu of reform, abolition might be the only alternative. He also advocated the introduction of women priests into the Anglican Church.

=== "The Monarchy Today" ===
Grigg was a committed monarchist. When talking to the journalist Robert Lacey about his public criticisms of the Royal Family, Grigg defended himself against the idea that he was an anti-monarchist: "That is like saying that an art critic is anti-art. I love the monarchy. Constitutional monarchy is Britain's greatest invention."

In an August 1957 article, "The Monarchy Today", Grigg argued his opinions on the young Queen Elizabeth II and her Court. Grigg's article was featured in the national press, and caused an international furore in which he was criticised by, amongst others, Geoffrey Fisher, the Archbishop of Canterbury. Within the first two days of the controversy that followed its publication, Grigg was invited to discuss his article with Martin Charteris, the Queen's assistant private secretary. During a political meeting at Eton thirty years later, Charteris publicly thanked Grigg for his work: "You did a great service to the monarchy and I'm glad to say so publicly."

At the time in 1957, as Lord Altrincham, Grigg was denounced by Altrincham Town Council for his views. A statement issued by the council on 6 August stated: "We the elected representatives of the ratepayers of this Ancient Town of Altrincham present at this informal meeting most strongly deplore the article written by Lord Altrincham and wish to completely disassociate this borough from the comments and statements contained in that article. At the same time we desire that it should be known by her Majesty the Queen that no town has a greater sense of loyalty and devotion to the Crown than the borough of Altrincham."

At the start of the controversy, Grigg was invited by Granada Television to be interviewed on their news programme Impact. The interview took place on the evening of 6 August 1957, and was conducted by Robin Day. Grigg defended his article in front of Day, stating that he did not wish to apologise or retract what he had written, but saying that he did regret that anyone should have thought he was hostile to the Queen. He said that his aim had been to bring about a change in the atmosphere which surrounded the Queen and the Monarchy across the whole country.

After the interview, Grigg left Television House in the company of Ludovic Kennedy. As the two of them came out onto the street, Philip Kinghorn Burbidge, a member of the far-right, extreme-nationalist League of Empire Loyalists, came up to them and slapped Grigg's face, saying: "Take that from the League of Empire Loyalists." Burbidge, who was 64 years old, was taken away by the police. Grigg said of the incident: "There was no strength behind the blow. I have not had to have any attention. There were quite a lot of bystanders who saw this happen. They all seemed tremendously friendly towards me."

At Bow Street, Burbidge later pleaded guilty to a charge of using insulting behaviour. He was fined 20 shillings. The Chief Metropolitan Magistrate, Sir Laurence Dunne, said of him: "I suppose 96 per cent of the population of this country were disgusted and offended by what was written, but I suppose that 99.9 per cent recurring of these would hesitate to select you as their champion. Your action only made a most unsavoury episode more squalid. In a case like this the weapon to be used is the weight of public opinion and not to make it the excuse for a gutter brawl."

Burbidge himself said: "Such actions are foreign to my nature. Due to the scurrilous attack by Lord Altrincham I felt it was up to a decent Briton to show resentment. What I feared most was the overseas repercussions and publication in American newspapers. I thought our fortunes were at a low ebb and such things only made them more deplorable."

Grigg was interviewed by Pathé News. Describing why he had written his article, he said, "I'm a journalist. I'm a subject of the Queen. I care very much for her future and I want her reign to be as successful as it possibly can be." Asked if he was at all repentant of his criticisms, he said, "No I can't say I am. I mean, everything controversial provokes criticism. But I'm quite sure that this needed saying, and from the letters that I'm getting in enormous numbers, I am convinced that a majority of the people in this country, and in other countries of the Commonwealth, are on my side in this matter. The letters at the moment are running 3 to 1 in my favour. But even if they weren't, I still would not be repentant, because I am sure what I said was true, and needed saying." On the Royal Court and the Queen's speeches, he said, "Well very briefly, the trouble about the Court is that it's all drawn from one small section of this country. It should be drawn from every country of the Commonwealth, and from every section of the community. That's what I feel about the Court. About the Queen's speeches, I feel her own natural self is not allowed to come through. It's a sort of synthetic creature that speaks. Not the Queen as she really is. And if she herself was allowed to speak, the effect would be wonderful."

Robert Menzies, the Prime Minister of Australia, was publicly critical of Grigg, describing his article as "shocking criticism": "It is a pity that it should have been lifted out of a journal with not a very great circulation and given an audience of many millions in the world Press. I think the Queen performs her duties in the Royal office with perfection, with great poise, great character, and great intelligence. If it is now to be said that she reads a speech I might say that many of the great statesmen of the world will have to face the same charge and had better be criticised for it."

Grigg responded to Menzies' criticism in a front page interview with the Melbourne Herald. "He is stuffily subservient... typical of the worst attitude towards the Crown... he puts the Queen on a pedestal and genuflects. He simply blindly worships the Sovereign as someone above criticism. Far from doing the Queen service he is doing her a disservice. I regard his attitude as disgusting, and if it were accepted by most of the Queen's subjects – ordinary people like you and me – the monarchy would be in grave danger. Please don't think I haven't great respect for Mr. Menzies. In the sort of Commonwealth court I visualize I would like to see men of Mr. Menzies' brilliance around the Queen, but not men of his particular view – by that, I don't mean his political view, but his approach towards the Monarchy."

Grigg also commented on the advice Menzies had given to the Queen during her 1954 tour of Western Australia. He said there had been a mild outbreak of poliomyelitis at the time. Although the risk of the Queen catching polio was minute, especially when compared to that for the thousands of people who crowded into the streets to see her, as a result of Menzies' advice, the Queen did not shake hands with anyone during her entire visit there. Of the Queen, Grigg said: "I feel that if the situation was put to her properly she would have seen that it wasn't the way a Sovereign acts."

Grigg took part in another Granada broadcast, Youth Wants To Know, this time from Granada Studios in Manchester. He stood by his criticism of the Queen spending a whole week watching racing at Goodwood: "She takes quite a lot of holidays as it is... If this were pointed out to her, I'm sure she would be the first to see it." Grigg also stated his belief that "the reason that our monarchy is so strong is that it is subject to comment and criticism." He said that he had not foreseen his article gaining "such very large publicity" and declared: "One can be clumsy and nevertheless have convictions."

Looking back, Grigg was critical of 1950s royal coverage, citing what he called its "blandness and servility": "I was rather worried by the general tone of comment, or the absence of comment really in regards to the monarchy – the way we were sort of drifting into a kind of Japanese Shintoism, at least it seemed to me, in which the monarchy was not so much loved as it should be and cherished, but worshipped in a kind of quasi-religious way. And criticism of the people who were actually embodying it at the time was completely out."

=== After 1960 ===
The National and English Review closed in June 1960, with its 928th and last issue. At the same time, Grigg started working at The Guardian, which had just relocated to London from its original home in Manchester. For the rest of the decade he wrote a column, entitled A Word in Edgeways, which he shared with Tony Benn.

== Work as a biographer and historian ==
At that same time, in the late 1960s, Grigg turned his attention to the project that would occupy him for the remainder of his life: a multi-volume biography of the British prime minister David Lloyd George. The first volume, The Young Lloyd George, was published in 1973. The second volume, Lloyd George: The People's Champion, which covered Lloyd George's life from 1902 to 1911, was released in 1978 and won the Whitbread Award for biography for that year. In 1985 the third volume, Lloyd George, From Peace To War 1912–1916, was published and subsequently received the Wolfson prize. When he died in 2001 Grigg had nearly completed the fourth volume, Lloyd George: War Leader, 1916–1918; the final chapter was finished by historian Margaret MacMillan (Lloyd George's great-granddaughter) and the book published in 2002. In all the volumes, Grigg showed a remarkable sympathy, and even affinity, for the "Welsh Wizard", despite the fact that their domestic personalities were very different. Historian Robert Blake judged the result to be "a fascinating story and is told with panache, vigour, clarity and impartiality by a great biographer."

Grigg also wrote a number of other books, including: Two Anglican Essays (discussing Anglicanism and changes to the Church of England), Is the Monarchy Perfect? (a compendium of some of his writings on the Monarchy), a biography of Nancy Astor; Volume VI in the official history of The Times covering the Thomson proprietorship; and The Victory that Never Was, in which he argued that the Western Allies prolonged the Second World War for a year by invading Europe in 1944 rather than 1943.

== Personal life ==
Grigg married Patricia Campbell, who worked at National and English Review, on 3 December 1958 at St Mary Magdalene Church, Tormarton, Gloucestershire. They later adopted two boys. He died from cancer on 31 December 2001.

== In popular culture ==
Grigg is portrayed by John Heffernan in the Netflix series The Crown. The show's historical consultant, Robert Lacey said, "I am very glad we've got this whole episode on Lord Altrincham, who is a well-known figure in England, and now will become so around the world."

Peerage of the United Kingdom
Preceded by Edward Grigg	Baron Altrincham; 1955–1963	Disclaimed Title next held by Anthony Grigg
