= Edward Grigg, 1st Baron Altrincham =

British colonial administrator and politician (1879–1955)

The Right Honourable The Lord Altrincham KCMG KCVO DSO MC PC

Governor of Kenya
- In office 10 February 1925 – 27 September 1930
- Monarch: George V
- Preceded by: Edward Denham (Acting)
- Succeeded by: Henry Monck-Mason Moore

Personal details
- Born: 8 September 1879 Madras, Madras Presidency, British India (now Chennai, Tamil Nadu, India)
- Died: 1 December 1955 (aged 76) Tormarton, Gloucestershire, England
- Party: Liberal, then Conservative
- Spouse: Joan Dickson-Poynder (m. 1923)
- Children: 3, including John Grigg
- Education: New College, Oxford
- Occupation: Journalist, civil servant
- Military career
- Allegiance: United Kingdom
- Branch: British Army
- Service years: 1914–1920
- Unit: Grenadier Guards
- Conflicts: First World War

Edward William Macleay Grigg, 1st Baron Altrincham, KCMG, KCVO, DSO, MC, PC (8 September 1879 – 1 December 1955) was a British colonial administrator and politician.

== Early life ==
Grigg was the son of Henry Bidewell Grigg, CIE, a member of the Indian Civil Service, sometime Political Resident of Travancore, and Elizabeth Louisa, née Thomson, whose parents were the Australian politician and administrator Sir Edward Deas Thomson and his wife, Anna Maria, daughter of General Sir Richard Bourke, Governor of New South Wales from 1831 to 1837. Born in Madras, he was educated at Winchester College and New College, Oxford, where he won the Gaisford Prize for Greek verse in 1902. Upon graduation, he embarked on a career in journalism. He joined The Times in 1903 as secretary to the editor, George Earle Buckle, then moved to The Outlook in 1905, where he worked as assistant editor under James Louis Garvin. Grigg returned to The Times in 1906, where he was the head of the colonial department until he resigned in 1913 to become the co-editor of The Round Table Journal.

== Military service ==
At the start of the First World War, Grigg enlisted in the Grenadier Guards and was commissioned as a special-reserve second lieutenant (on probation) on 13 March 1915. He was confirmed in his rank on 11 August, with a promotion to temporary lieutenant. He was subsequently promoted to lieutenant (effective 15 July 1915), and to temporary captain on 8 November. Serving in France, he distinguished himself in combat before his transfer to the staff as a GSO 3 on 4 February 1916, briefly relinquishing his temporary rank of captain with effect from 27 January, and resuming it from 15 April.

He received the Military Cross in 1917 and the Distinguished Service Order the following year and was a lieutenant-colonel by the end of the war. He was the only civilian (non-regular officer) to become GSO 1 of a division during the war. Grigg was created Commander of the Order of St Michael and St George in 1919 and served as military secretary to Edward, Prince of Wales (later Edward VIII) from 1919 to 1920, accompanying the prince on tours of Canada, Australia and New Zealand. For his services, Grigg was appointed Commander of the Royal Victorian Order in 1919 and Knight Commander of the Royal Victorian Order in 1920.

== Entry to politics ==
Upon his return in 1920, Grigg became a private secretary to Prime Minister David Lloyd George. Grigg became devoted to Lloyd George and developed a deep respect for the "Welsh Wizard" that subsequently limited his political career. Grigg helped write the King's speech for the opening of the Parliament of Northern Ireland. He also helped draft the British proposals which led to the Anglo Irish Treaty (signed 6 December 1921). After Lloyd George's departure in 1922, Grigg passed up a number of appointments within the civil service to enter the House of Commons. He was elected to Parliament as a Liberal Member of Parliament (MP) in 1922 from the constituency of Oldham. Meanwhile, he also served as secretary to the Rhodes Trust, a position that he held from 1923 to 1925.

In 1923, Grigg married Joan Dickson-Poynder, daughter of fellow politician Lord Islington. They had three children:

- John Edward Poynder Grigg, 2nd Baron Altrincham (15 April 1924 – 31 December 2001), journalist and author
- Annabel Desirée Grigg, (b. 19 November 1931),
- Anthony Ulrick David Dundas Grigg, 3rd Baron Altrincham (12 January 1934 — 1 August 2020).

== Governor of Kenya ==
In 1925, Grigg resigned his seat to accept an appointment as governor of Kenya. He was frustrated in his assigned task to merge Kenya with the bordering British colonies of Uganda and Tanganyika, but he provided energetic administration to the colony by improving agriculture, education and infrastructure during his governorship. However, he opposed consideration of the colony's development into a multi-racial state and believed that the native African population was ill-prepared for managing the government. Meanwhile, he was named KCMG in 1928. Grigg declared female circumcision to be illegal in the colony and used the armed forces of the colony to enforce the ban. Men who were caught circumcising women were arrested by British authorities, which led to some backlash in Kenya's indigenous African majority.

== Resuming politics ==
Grigg returned to Britain in 1930. He was offered his choice of Indian governorships, but his poor health, along with that of his wife, forestalled his accepting an appointment. Instead, Grigg decided to re-enter politics. Though initially nominated as the Conservative candidate for the Leeds Central constituency in the 1931 general election, Grigg loyally stood aside for the National Labour candidate, Richard Denman. Two years later, he returned to Parliament in a by-election for the constituency of Altrincham. He would serve as MP for Altrincham until the constituency was abolished in 1945.

Grigg's return to politics coincided with the rise to power of Adolf Hitler as German chancellor. Grigg feared the Nazi movement and in two books pressed the case for a strong defence against the threat that it posed. However, Grigg never openly challenged the policy of appeasement that was advanced by the governments of Stanley Baldwin and Neville Chamberlain and kept his criticisms private. When war broke out, Grigg joined the government as Parliamentary Secretary to the Ministry of Information. In April 1940, he became first the financial secretary, then joint parliamentary Under-Secretary of State for War, a post that he held until March 1942. He declined Winston Churchill's invitation to become First Commissioner of Works, as it was dependent upon acceptance of a peerage, and Grigg did not return to government until 21 November 1944 when he was selected as Minister-Resident for the Middle East as successor to Lord Moyne, who had been assassinated two weeks earlier. Grigg was also appointed a Privy Counsellor in 1944.

== Later life ==
In the aftermath of the Conservative caretaker government's defeat at the 1945 general election, Grigg was raised to the peerage as Baron Altrincham, of Tormarton in the County of Gloucester, which ended his political career. Three years later, he assumed the editorship of the National Review, a post that he held until failing health forced his retirement in 1954. Grigg died a year later in Gloucestershire aged 76. His son, John Grigg, who became the second Baron Altrincham upon his father's death, disclaimed the peerage in 1963 under the terms of the Peerage Act of that year.

== Works ==
- The Greatest Experiment in World History (1924)
- Unity (1935)
- The Faith of an Englishman (1936)
- Britain Looks at Germany (1938)
- The British Commonwealth: Its Place in the Service of the World (1944)
- Kenya's Opportunity: Memories, Hopes and Ideas (1955)

== Arms ==
Coat of arms of Edward Grigg, 1st Baron Altrincham
Crest A grenade Sable fired Proper between two roses Argent barbed and seeded also Proper. Escutcheon Sable three owls Argent on a chief Azure issuant from the base thereof a sun in splendour Or. Supporters On either side a lion Gules gorged with a chain collar pendent therefrom a portcullis Or and supporting a date palm fructed Proper. Motto Servire Et Servare (To Serve And Preserve)

Parliament of the United Kingdom
Preceded by Sir William Barton; Edmund Denniss	Member of Parliament for Oldham; 1922–1925; With: William John Tout 1922–1924; Duff Cooper 1924–1925	Succeeded by Duff Cooper; William Wiggins
Preceded by Cyril Atkinson	Member of Parliament for Altrincham; 1933–1945	Constituency abolished
Political offices
Preceded by Sir Robert Coryndon	Governor of Kenya; 1925–1930	Succeeded by Sir Joseph Byrne
Peerage of the United Kingdom
New creation	Baron Altrincham; 1945–1955	Succeeded by John Grigg
Media offices
Preceded by Violet Milner	Editor of National Review; 1948–1954	Succeeded by John Grigg
