= William Graham (Edinburgh MP) =

Scottish politician

The Right Honourable William Graham
- Graham in 1924

President of the Board of Trade
- In office 7 June 1929 – 24 August 1931
- Monarch: George V
- Prime Minister: Ramsay MacDonald
- Preceded by: Philip Cunliffe-Lister
- Succeeded by: Philip Cunliffe-Lister

Personal details
- Born: 29 July 1887 Peebles, Scotland
- Died: 8 January 1932 (aged 44) Hendon, Middlesex, England
- Resting place: Hendon, Middlesex, England
- Party: Labour
- Spouse: Margaret Graham
- Education: University of Edinburgh
- Occupation: Politician

William Graham PC (29 July 1887 – 8 January 1932) was a Scottish Labour politician.

Born in Peebles, he was educated at Peebles Public School and George Heriot's School, Edinburgh. After a time as a junior clerk in the War Office, he became a journalist.

He joined the Independent Labour Party in 1906, and was elected to Edinburgh Town Council in 1913. He gained an MA from University of Edinburgh in 1915, and was later awarded an honorary LLD by the university in 1927.

He served as Labour MP for Edinburgh Central from 1918 until 1931. Early in his parliamentary career he found himself at odds with many Labour MPs and contemplated joining the Liberals. He held office as Financial Secretary to the Treasury in 1924 (when he was sworn in as a Privy Councillor) and as President of the Board of Trade from 1929 to 1931. He was responsible for the Coal-Mines Bill, several overseas missions, and industrial inquiries. He was appointed a Privy Counsellor in 1924. He also served on the Royal Commissions on income-tax in 1919, and Oxford and Cambridge in 1920–1921, and was a Member of the Speaker's Conference on Devolution in 1919–1920. He was also a Member of the Medical Research Council from 1920 to 1928.

He was joint Deputy Leader of the Labour Party from 1931 until his death from pneumonia in 1932.

Parliament of the United Kingdom
Preceded by Charles Edward Price	Member of Parliament for Edinburgh Central; 1918–1931	Succeeded by James Guy
Political offices
Preceded by Walter Guinness	Financial Secretary to the Treasury; 1924	Succeeded by Ronald McNeill
Preceded by Philip Cunliffe-Lister	President of the Board of Trade; 1929–1931	Succeeded by Philip Cunliffe-Lister
