= Tormarton =

Village and civil parish in South Gloucestershire

Coordinates: 51.507°N 02.335°W

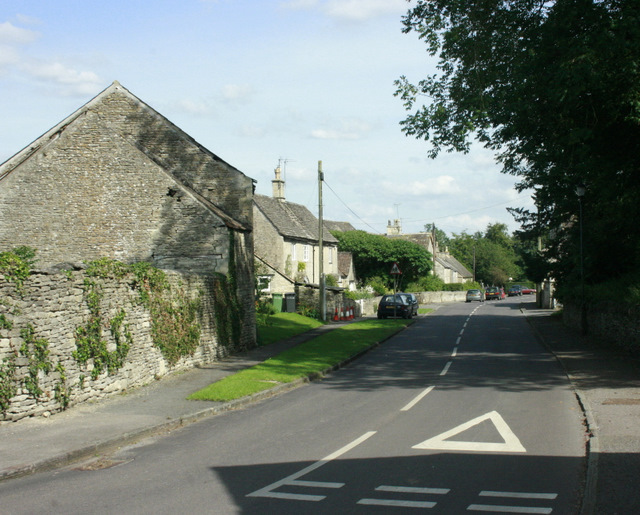
- Tormarton High Street

- Location within Gloucestershire
- Population: 323 (2021)
- OS grid reference: ST768787
- Civil parish: Tormarton
- Unitary authority: South Gloucestershire
- Ceremonial county: Gloucestershire
- Region: South West
- Country: England
- Sovereign state: United Kingdom
- Post town: Badminton
- Postcode district: GL9
- Dialling code: 01454
- Police: Avon and Somerset
- Fire: Avon
- Ambulance: South Western
- UK Parliament: Thornbury and Yate
- Website: Parish Council

Tormarton is a village and civil parish in the South Gloucestershire district, in the ceremonial county of Gloucestershire, England. The village is about half a mile north of the M4 motorway; the A46 road towards Bath passes a similar distance west of the village to join the motorway at junction 18. The parish includes the small village of West Littleton, south of the motorway. The parish population at the 2021 census was 323. The Cotswold Way footpath passes through the village.

== History ==
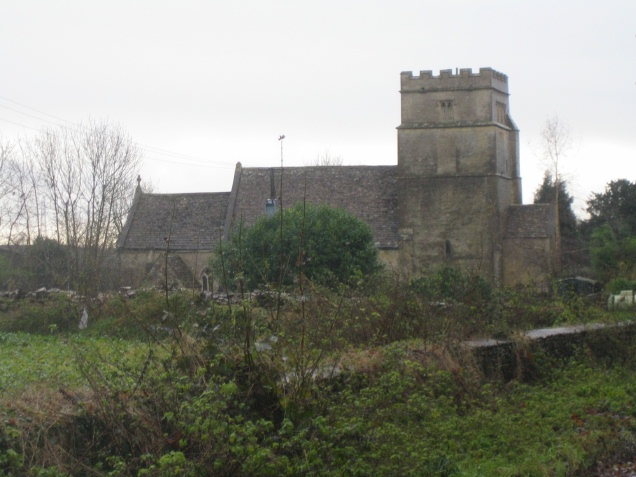
St Mary Magdalene church

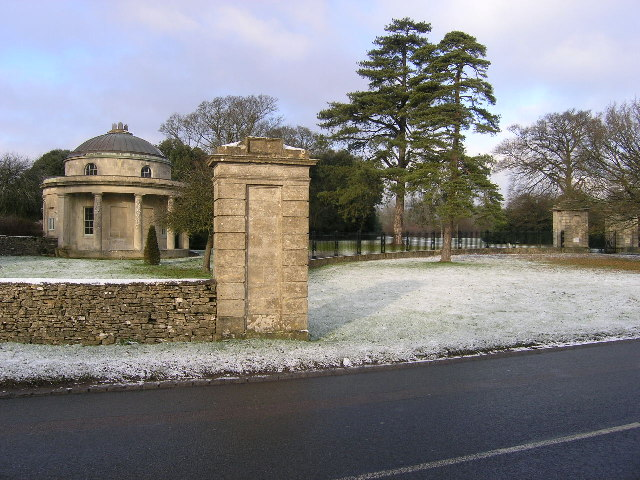
The main entrance to Dodington Park

It is thought that humans have been active in the area of Tormarton for more than 6,000 years. In 1968 the bodies of three Bronze Age men were discovered near Tormarton, when a gas pipeline was being installed. Unusually, two of the bodies showed combat wounds; they are now in Bristol Museum & Art Gallery. Further excavations were made in 1999 and 2000, which found remains of two other bodies estimated to be 3,500 years old. They are all thought to have all died at a similar time and were then buried in a ditch. A BBC documentary, Meet The Ancestors, was made that followed the second excavation.

The area is thought to have been inhabited by the Romans as a stone coffin was found in nearby Hinton. The village was on the border of the Anglo Saxon kingdoms of Wessex and Mercia. The medieval village was larger than today: extensive earthworks to the north and east of the church suggest that this area may have been settled previously. Its name may come from Thor Maer Tun, meaning The settlement with the thorn (tree) on the boundary. Another source suggests the name derives from the church tower (Tor) on the border between Wessex and Mercia (Anglo-Saxon Meark).

The village became part of the Badminton estate, owned by the Duke of Beaufort, in 1789. In 1848 the population of the parish was 620.

Baron Altrincham, of Tormarton is a title in the Peerage of the United Kingdom that was created in 1945 for the politician Edward Grigg and then held by John Grigg who disclaimed the title under the Peerage Act 1963.

The M4 motorway to the west of Tormarton opened in 1967, with the section to the east running to Stanton St Quintin (Junction 17) opening four years later.

In 2008, SITA made a planning application to build a large in-vessel composting facility near Tormarton. Previously SITA had been proposing to site it on a brown field site in Pucklechurch but this was met with opposition from residents due to concerns it could pose a health risk and be an eyesore. The proposed facility would handle 30,000 tonnes of waste a year. BBC News reported that it was controversial with residents in Tormarton too.

== Notable buildings ==
The Church of England parish church of St Mary Magdelene stands to the north of the present village. Its Norman origins can be seen in the chancel arch and the lower two stages of the tower. The south aisle was added in the 14th century, and in 1853 T. H. Wyatt added the south porch and the vestry. The church was designated as Grade I listed in 1985.

The former manor house, now Manor Farmhouse, is south-west of the church. Originally the home of the St Loe family of Tormarton and Sutton Court at Chew Magna, it was later owned by the de la Riviere family. Dating from c.1350, the house was enlarged to the rear in the next century and further added to and altered in the 17th, 18th and 19th centuries.

Tormarton Court is a Grade II listed Georgian rectory, now a house. The manor house at West Littleton, from c.1500 with later alterations, is Grade II* listed.

== Notable residents ==
- James Dyson's estate, Dodington Park, lies beyond the western boundary of the parish
- John Mackay (1914–1999), headmaster of Bristol Grammar School, retired to Tormarton
- Robert Payne (1596–1651), cleric and academic
- Edward Grigg, 1st Baron Altrincham lived at Tormarton Court until his death in 1955
- Sir William St Loe, Captain of the Guard to Queen Elizabeth I, Chief Butler of England and the third husband of Bess of Hardwick owned the manor of Tormarton
- Sir Edward Wadham, Sheriff of Somerset and Dorset in 1502, married the widow of Sir John St Loe, father of William St Loe, and lived at the old manor of Tormarton in the early sixteenth century. He was Esquire of the Body in 1509 at the funeral of King Henry VII, and with his nephew Sir Nicholas Wadham represented the counties of Somerset and Gloucestershire at the Field of the Cloth of Gold with King Henry VIII in 1520. He was Sheriff of Gloucestershire in 1525, 1531, and 1541.
