= Baron Islington =

Title in the Peerage of the United Kingdom

John Poynder Dickson, 1st Baron Islington

Baron Islington, of Islington in the County of London, was a title in the Peerage of the United Kingdom. It was created in 1910 for Sir John Poynder-Dickson, 6th Baronet, Governor of New Zealand from 1910 to 1912.

The Baronetcy of Dickson of Hardingham Hall (Hardingham Hall in the County of Norfolk), was created in the Baronetage of the United Kingdom on 21 September 1802 for Archibald Dickson, an admiral in the Royal Navy, with remainder, in default of male issue of his own, to his nephew Archibald Collingwood Dickson and the male issue of his body.

Dickson had no sons and was succeeded according to the special remainder by his nephew, the second Baronet. He was the son of Admiral William Dickson. The second Baronet was a rear-admiral in the Royal Navy. He was succeeded by his eldest son, the third Baronet. He was a vice-admiral in the Royal Navy. He was childless and was succeeded by his younger brother, the fourth Baronet. He was a colonel in the Bengal Army. He was succeeded by his younger brother, the fifth Baronet. He was a captain in the Royal Navy. He was childless and was succeeded by his nephew, the aforementioned sixth Baronet who was elevated to the peerage in 1910. He was the only son of John Bourmaster Dickson (1815-1876), a rear-admiral in the Royal Navy and the fifth son of the second Baronet, by his first wife Sarah Matilda (d. 1863), daughter of Thomas Poynder, of Hilmarton near Calne, Wiltshire. In 1888, on succeeding to the estates of his maternal uncle, he assumed by Royal licence the additional surname of Poynder. The titles became extinct on Lord Islington's death in 1936.

The first Baronet was the nephew of James Dickson, Member of Parliament for Lanark Burghs and the brother of the aforementioned William Dickson (d. 1803), an admiral in the Royal Navy.

== Dickson, later Poynder Dickson, baronets of Hardingham Hall (1802) ==
- Sir Archibald Dickson, 1st Baronet (died 1803)
- Sir Archibald Collingwood Dickson, 2nd Baronet (1772–1827)
- Sir William Dickson, 3rd Baronet (1798–1868)
- Sir Colpoys Dickson, 4th Baronet (1807–1868)
- Sir Alexander Collingwood Thomas Dickson, 5th Baronet (1810–1884)
- Sir John Poynder Dickson, 6th Baronet (1866–1936) (created Baron Islington in 1910)

Coat of arms of Poynder-Dickson of Hardingham Hall
Crest 1st, on a wreath of the colours, issuant from the battlements of a tower Argent, charged with a cross flory Gules, a dexter cubit arm vested Sable, charged with a key as in the arms, cuffed Or, the hand proper holding a cross patée fitchée in bend also Argent (Poynder) ; 2nd, on a wreath of the colours, in front of an arm in armour brandishing a falchion Proper, a trident and spear in saltire Or (Dickson) Escutcheon Quarterly, 1 and 4: pily counter-pily of four traits Or and Sable, the points ending in crosses formy two in chief and one in base, in the centre chief points a tower of the Second and in base two martlets of the First, a chief Azure, thereon a key erect, the wards upwards and to the sinister Gold between a rose on the dexter and a fleur-de-lis on the sinister Argent (Poynder); 2 and 3: Azure, an anchor erect Or, encircled by an oak wreath Vert between three mullets pierced Or, on a chief paly of seven of the Last and Gules a mural crown Argent (Dickson). Motto Fortes fortuna juvat

== Barons Islington (1910) ==
- John Poynder Dickson, 1st Baron Islington (1866–1936)

Coat of arms of Islington, Poynder-Dickson
Coronet Baron's coronet Crest 1st, on a wreath of the colours, issuant from the battlements of a tower Argent, charged with a cross flory Gules, a dexter cubit arm vested Sable, charged with a key as in the arms, cuffed Or, the hand proper holding a cross patée fitchée in bend also Argent (Poynder) ; 2nd, on a wreath of the colours, in front of an arm in armour brandishing a falchion Proper, a trident and spear in saltire Or (Dickson) Escutcheon Quarterly, 1 and 4: pily counter-pily of four traits Or and Sable, the points ending in crosses formy two in chief and one in base, in the centre chief points a tower of the Second and in base two martlets of the First, a chief Azure, thereon a key erect wards upwards and to the sinister Gold between a rose on the dexter and a fleur-de-lis on the sinister Argent (Poynder); 2 and 3: Azure, an anchor erect Or, encircled by an oak wreath Vert between three mullets pierced Or, on a chief paly of seven of the Last and Gules a mural crown Argent (Dickson). Supporters Dexter, an eagle Proper ; Sinister, a lion Gules, each gorged with a collar Or, pendent therefrom a bezant, charged with a rose Gules. Motto Fortes fortuna juvat

Baronetage of the United Kingdom
Preceded by Baker baronets	Dickson baronets of Hardingham Hall; 21 September 1802	Succeeded by Braithwaite baronets
