= Andrew Gilzean =

Scottish politician

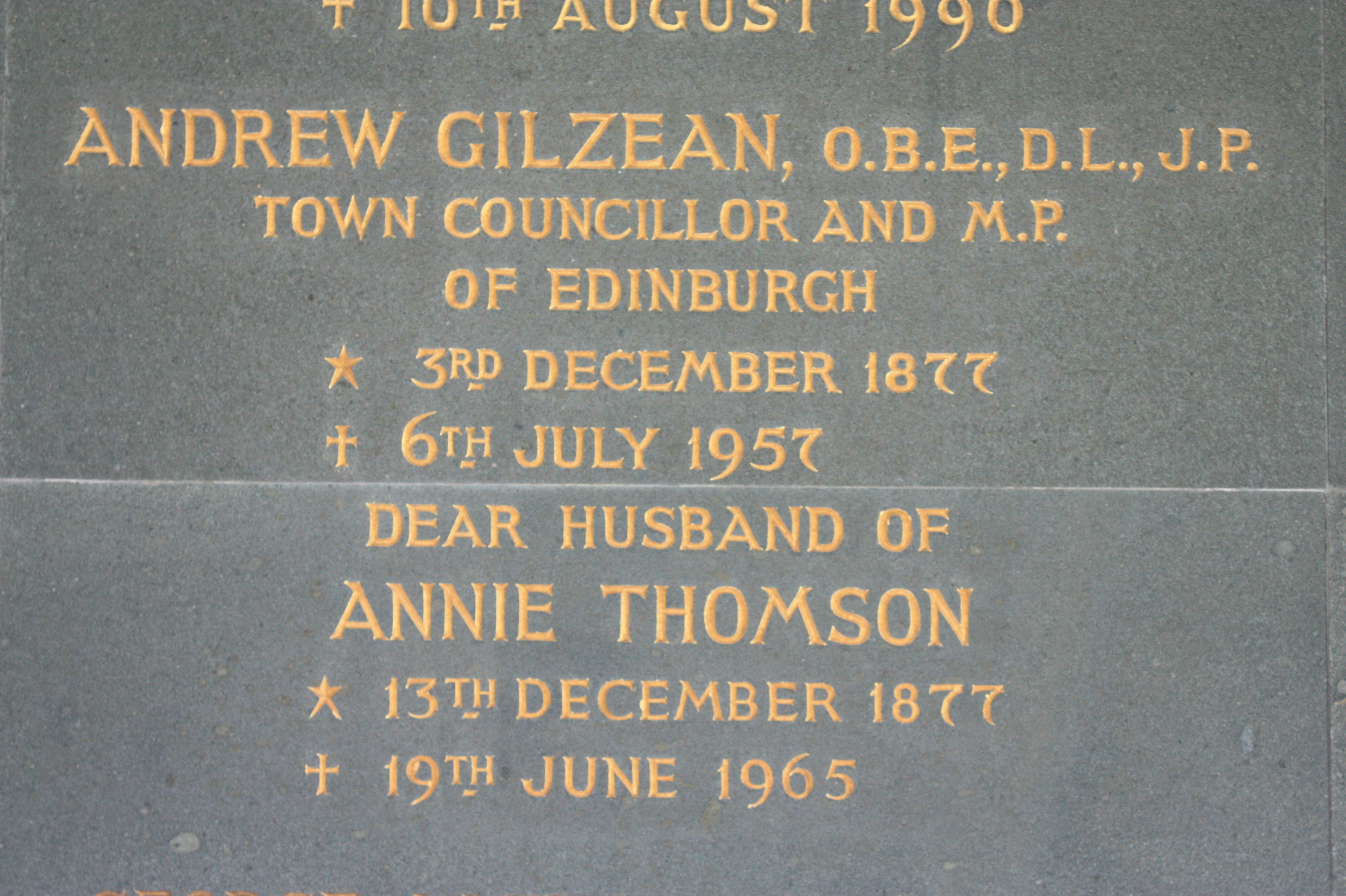
Memorial to Andrew Gilzean, Warriston Crematorium

Andrew Gilzean OBE (3 December 1877 – 6 July 1957) was a Labour Party politician in Scotland. He was Member of Parliament (MP) for Edinburgh Central from 1945 to 1951.

Initially a member of the Independent Labour Party, Gilzean joined the Scottish Socialist Party split in 1932, and was elected as its vice-chair. This organisation affiliated to the Labour Party, for which he unsuccessfully contested Edinburgh Central at the 1935 general election, winning 41% of the votes. He won the seat in the Labour landslide at the 1945 general election with majority of 4,220 votes, becoming an MP for first time at the age of 67.

His majority was slightly reduced to 2,937 at the 1950 general election, and he stood down at the 1951 general election.

Andrew was married to Annie Thomson (1877–1965). Both were cremated at Warriston Crematorium and a plaque to their memory exists in the southern arcade.

Parliament of the United Kingdom
Preceded by Frank Watt	Member of Parliament for Edinburgh Central; 1945–1951	Succeeded by Tom Oswald
