= Oldham by-election =

Oldham by-election may refer to several by-elections in the town of Oldham, north-west England:

- 1872 Oldham by-election — followed death of Liberals' John Platt — Conservative gain
- 1877 Oldham by-election — followed death of Conservatives' John Morgan Cobbett — Liberal gain
- 1899 Oldham by-election — followed resignation of Conservatives' James Oswald and death of Conservatives's Robert Ascroft — Liberal gains
- 1911 Oldham by-election — followed elevation to peerage of Alfred Emmott — Liberal hold
- 1925 Oldham by-election — followed appointment of Liberals' Edward Grigg as Governor of Kenya — Liberal hold
- 1968 Oldham West by-election — followed resignation of Labour's Charles Hale — Conservative gain
- 2011 Oldham East and Saddleworth by-election — followed voiding of Labour's 2010 general election win — Labour hold
- 2015 Oldham West and Royton by-election — followed death of Labour's Michael Meacher — Labour hold
