= West Street Cemetery =

Cemetery in Surrey, England

Coordinates: 51°12′35″N 0°48′38″W

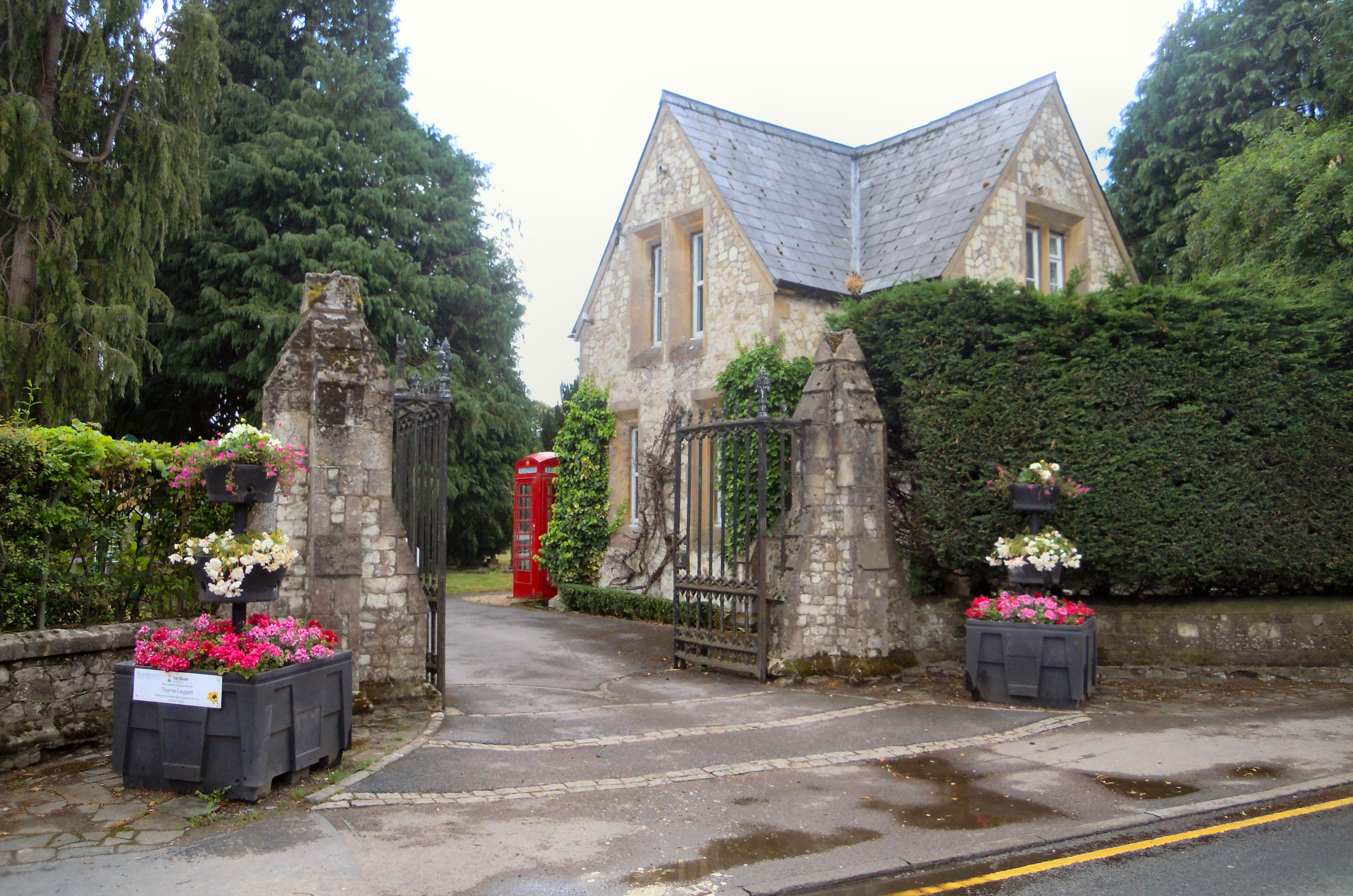
The gates to West Street Cemetery in Farnham in Surrey

West Street Cemetery (also known as Farnham Civil Cemetery) on West Street in Farnham in Surrey is one of four cemeteries in the Farnham area owned and maintained by Farnham Town Council. The two Cemetery chapels have been Grade II listed buildings on the Historic England Register since 1990.

== History ==
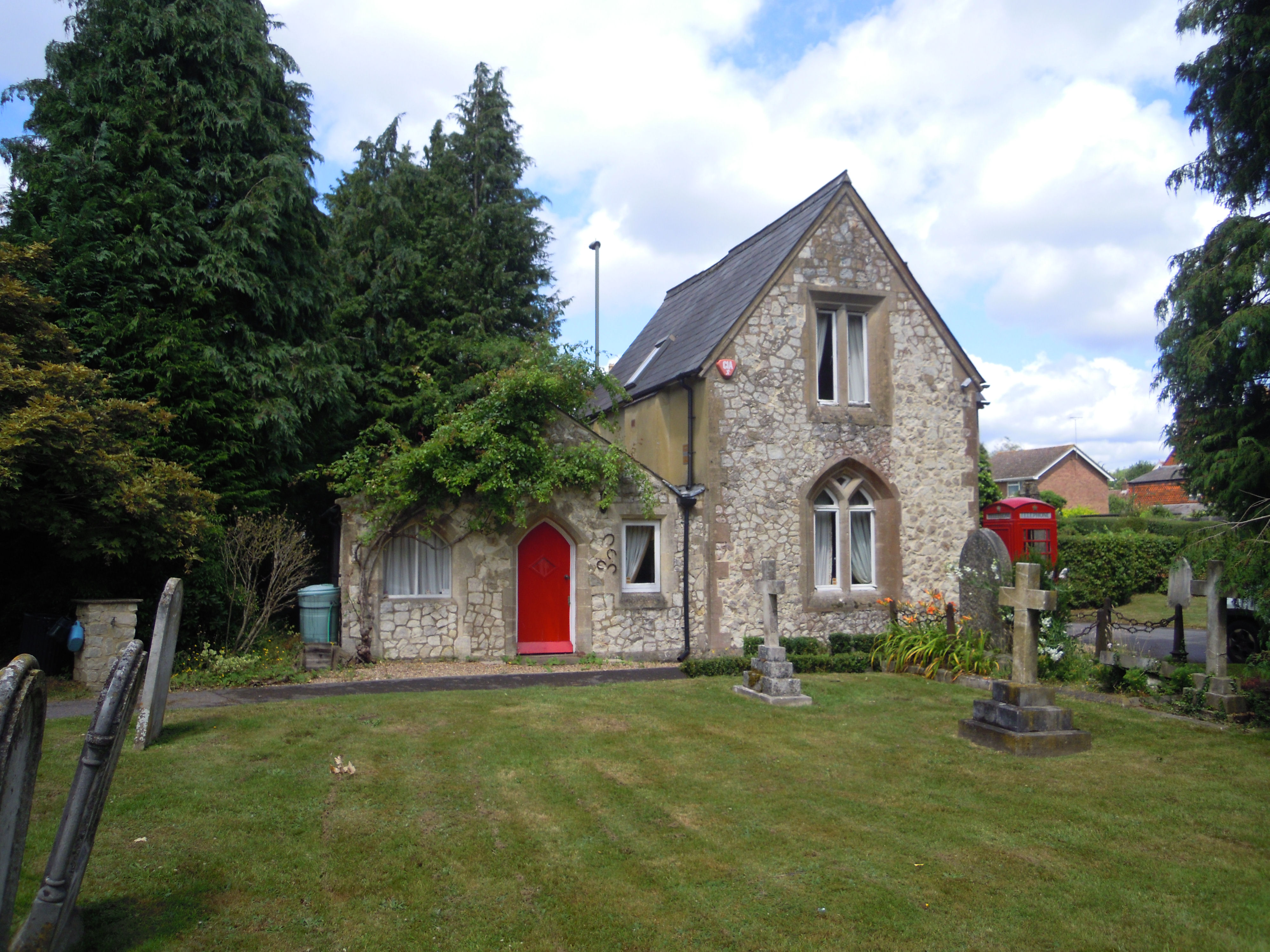
The Cemetery Lodge in 2019

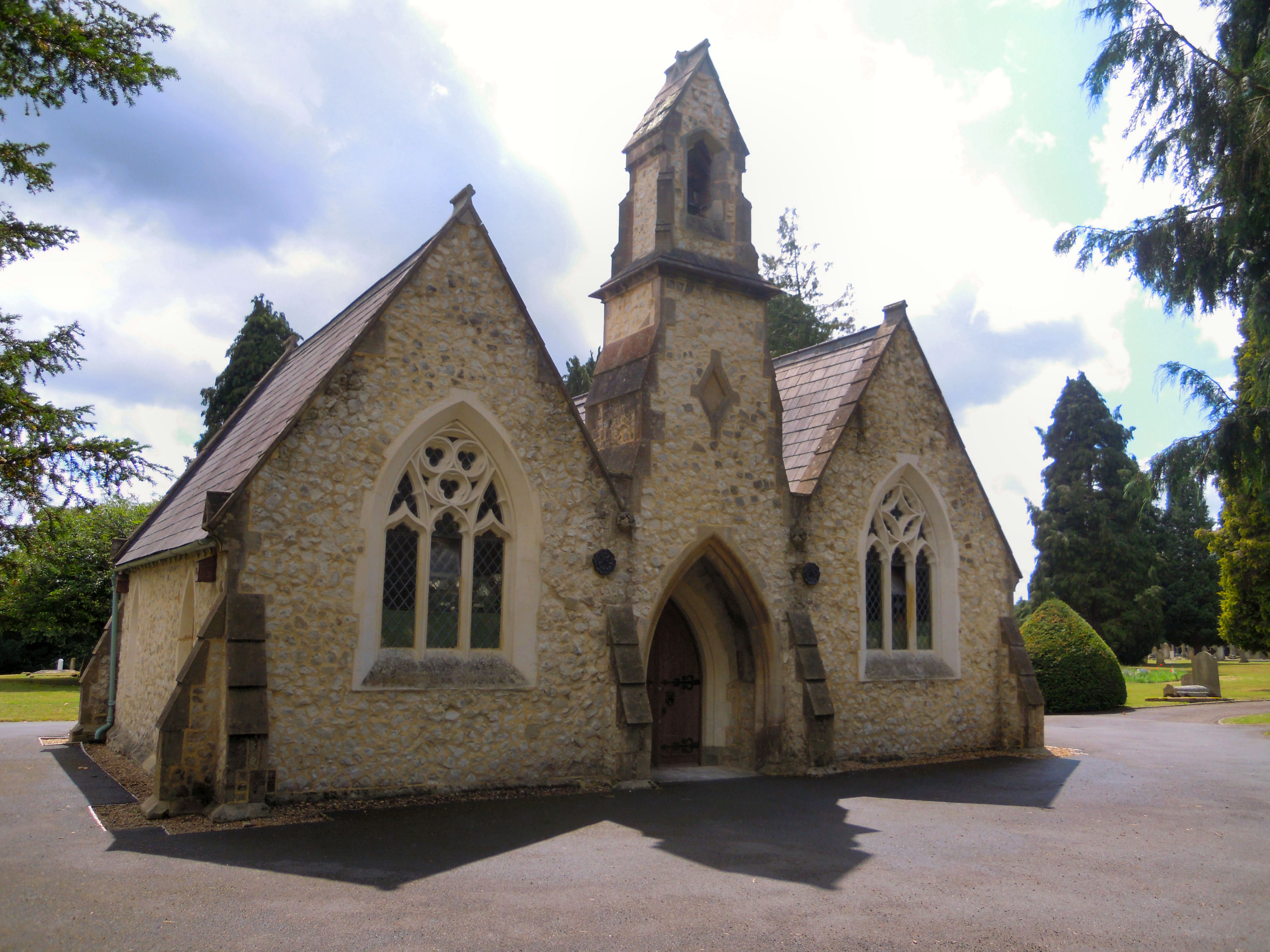
The former Cemetery chapels are now a workshop

A Burial Board was formed in Farnham in 1853 with the view to opening a cemetery in the town. The Board originally considered three plots of land in Farnham and at first accepted land at Willey Mill from Charles Knight; however, the total cost including the building of the two chapels would have cost nearly £3,500 and the Vestry would only sanction £3000. In May 1855 the Vestry suggested an alternative piece of land from Knight but the negotiations broke down so a plot of 15.8 acres in West Street was eventually bought from Thomas Pearce at a cost of £1200 plus £125 to buy out a Mr Mathers, a tenant on the site at the time. The Cemetery Lodge located at the original gates was built by Goddards of East Street in Farnham. The Cemetery opened in 1856. A Richard Wooderson was appointed Sexton on £10 per annum, and he moved into the lodge on 1 May 1856 with the first burial taking place on 3 May that year; during the first decade of the cemetery's existence there were about 80 to 90 burials a year. A newspaper report of 1931 records that four men were employed at the cemetery. The lodge became the first project of the Farnham Trust; the building having been condemned by Farnham Urban District Council (FUDC) the members of the Farnham Trust leased the building from FUDC, restored it and let it to a tenant. By 1980 additional restoration work was needed when internal dry rot was found. A long lease from Waverley District Council was obtained and the Trust then sold the lease. The lodge is now privately owned, and a new lodge has been built at the new entrance further along on the West Street frontage.

In about 1870 the two chapels were built, one for Church of England services and the other for Nonconformist services. The cemetery came under the control of the Joint Burial Committee in 1895 and Farnham Council on 27 July 1926. In 1947 an additional area of 16.2 acres was obtained of which 9.6 acres were turned over to the Cemetery for use as an additional area for burials. This new burial ground is beyond a vintage brick wall which bisects the two halves of the cemetery. A report in 1947 records that common graves with a single burial at 6 ft could be reused after about 14 years. After passing into the hands of Waverley District Council it was transferred to Farnham Town Council in 2006.

The West Street Garden of Reflection is a quiet area where people may sit and reflect. There are a number of military burials of all three Services maintained by the Commonwealth War Graves Commission – 23 from World War I and 17 from World War II.

== Cemetery chapels ==
The Cemetery chapels photographed in 1880

The cemetery chapels were built of random rubble with Bath stone window surrounds and a slate roof in about 1870 in the Gothic style. The front has two gables divided by a central gabled bell-cote while the rear elevation has three gables. The chapels were provided with plain wooden altars and pews.

By 2013 the chapels were disused and a meeting was held to discuss their future – whether they should be converted for use as workshops, homes or community centres. Today (2019) the chapels are used by a local designer as a workshop.

== Notable burials ==
- John Morgan Cobbett (1800–1877), son of William Cobbett and MP for Oldham (1872–1877)
- Mike Hawthorn (1929–1959), British racing driver who became the United Kingdom's first Formula One World Champion driver in 1958
