= John Fielden =

British industrialist and Radical Member of Parliament

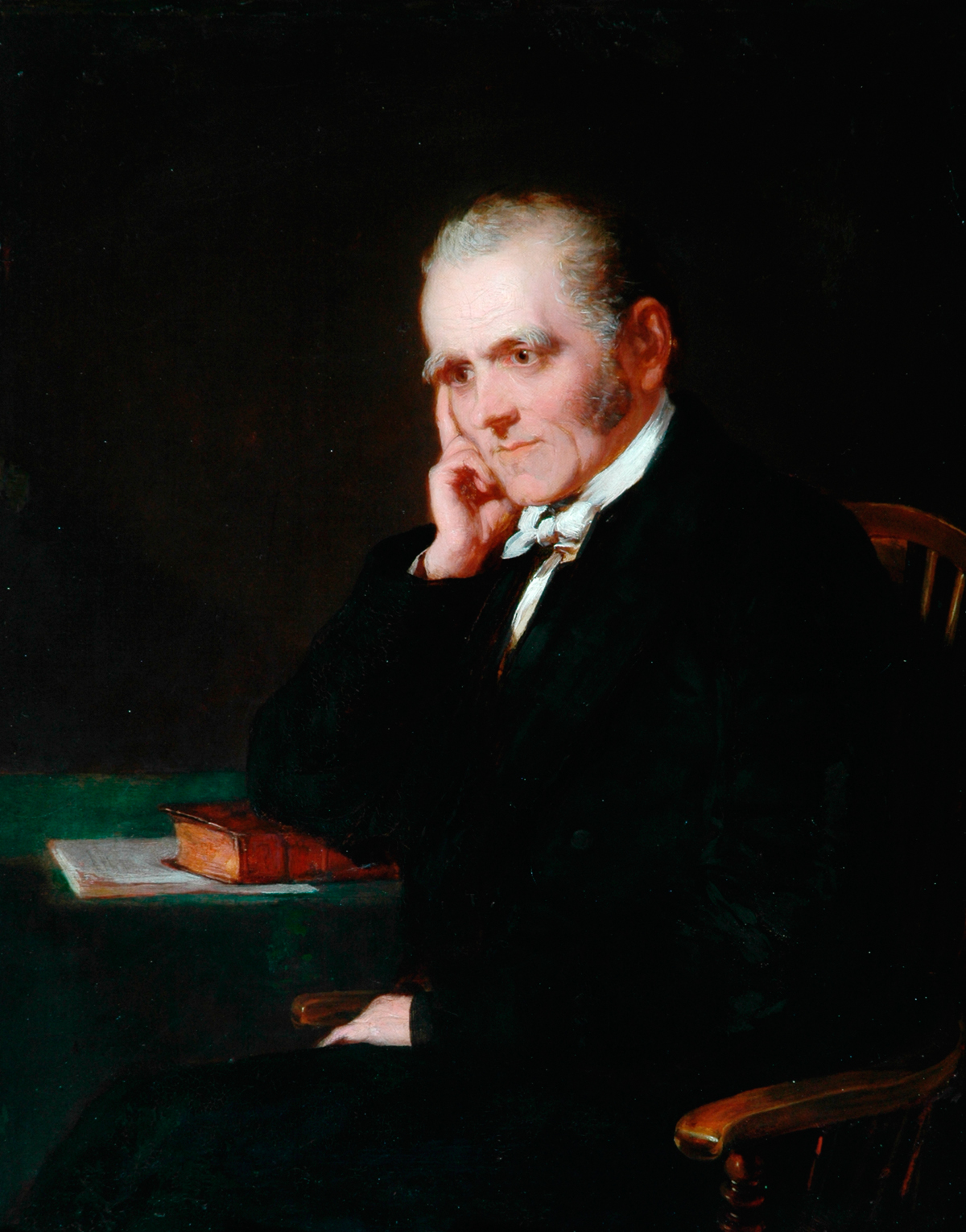
"One of the most experienced, most wealthy, most intelligent, and most humane men in the kingdom" or "The self-acting mule" : John Fielden MP, 1845

John Fielden (17 January 1784 – 29 May 1849) was a British industrialist and Radical Member of Parliament for Oldham (1832–1847).

He entered Parliament to support William Cobbett, whose election as fellow-MP for Oldham he helped to bring about. Like Cobbett, but unlike many other Radicals, he saw Radicalism as having little more in common with Whiggism than with Toryism: in the Commons he sat with the Whigs but frequently did not vote with them. Whigs and the more orthodox Whig-Radicals, therefore, thought the name of one of the machines used in his cotton-spinning business, "the self-acting mule," a highly appropriate soubriquet. Having started work in his father's cotton mill when little more than ten, he was a firm and generous supporter of the factory reform movement. He also urged repeal of the New Poor Law and pressed for action to be taken to alleviate the 'distress of the country' (in particular the plight of hand-loom weavers), but found little support in Parliament on these issues. Despairing that the concerns of the poor would never be given adequate attention by a 'Ten-Pound Parliament' (elected on the 1832 franchise), he became a 'moral force' Chartist. On the failure of the Chartist National Petition he argued for the movement to organise further petitions; when this advice was rejected he ceased to appear at Chartist events: whilst supporting the aims of Chartism, he concentrated on single issues, striving to attract wider support for reform (including those who would be deterred by any linkage to Chartism or its full agenda). In 1847 he introduced and piloted through the Commons the Ten Hours Act, limiting the hours of work of women and children in textile mills.

"Prompted solely by humanity and a sense of justice, he spent much valuable time, much earnest labour, and much of his pecuniary means, in procuring an act of parliament for shortening the hours of labour of women and children in factories."

== Family firm ==
John Fielden was the third son of Joshua Fielden, a Quaker who about the time of John's birth set up as a cotton spinner in Todmorden. Joshua started cotton spinning in a small way, but by his exertions and those of his sons Fielden Brothers (Note: Fieldens & Co of Blackburn (in 1835 a partnership of William Fielden, William Throp, and William Townley, by 1848 a partnership of Sir William Fielden, Montagu Joseph Fielden, and John Leyland Fielden) also owned and operated cotton mills, but had no connection with the Fieldens of Todmorden. As if to increase the possibility of confusion William was elected to Parliament (for Blackburn) in 1832 at the same time John Fielden was elected for Oldham - Parliamentary reporters seem to have taken some time to realise there were two Lancastrian millowner Fielden MPs and a bit longer to reliably distinguish between them) grew to be one of the largest cotton manufacturers in England. According to William Cobbett in 1832 they were involved in spinning weaving and printing and employing over 2,500 persons. Cobbett also stressed that the brothers were "famed for their goodness to every creature who is in their employ ... let others do what they may, these gentlemen have preferred a little profit, and even no profit, to great gains from half starvation of the people from whose labour they derive those gains."

John began working in the family mill "when I was little more than ten years old" and was, therefore, able in later life to speak from personal experience of the unsuitability for children of that age of even a ten-hour day. When slightly older, he assisted his father with the purchase of raw materials and sale of finished goods – attending market in Manchester involved a round trip of 40 miles on foot, and a twenty-hour day. After the death of his father in 1811, and of his eldest brother Samuel in 1822, John was responsible for purchasing and sales, his brother Thomas looked after a permanent warehouse Fieldens set up in Manchester, James looked after production, and the eldest surviving brother (Joshua) was responsible for machinery.

Whilst Todmorden was at some distance from ports and home markets, the firm's main site at Waterside lay in a narrow valley used first by the Rochdale Canal and then by the Manchester and Leeds Railway (which the Fieldens helped establish, John being a member of the company's provisional committee (Note: The Manchester and Leeds became part of the Lancashire and Yorkshire Railway; later in the century Samuel Fielden was said to have the largest single shareholding in the L&YR, and the family to be getting more income from L&YR dividends than from the family firm)) as part of an indirect but relatively low-level route between Manchester and Leeds, and the firms' expansion was helped by the consequent improvement in communications. In addition to the establishments owned by Fielden Brothers in and around Todmorden, individual members of the family also owned mills in their own right; for example in 1844 Robinwood Mill was bought (largely built, but unglazed and without motive power) by John Fielden - however he did not operate it as a separate concern, but let it to the family firm.

In 1846, the firm was said to be processing 200,000 pounds of cotton per week; thought then to be the largest weekly consumption of cotton of any firm in the world. A correspondent for the Morning Post reported that within 2 miles of Todmorden there were thirty-three mills, eight of them operated by Fielden Brothers:

Owing to the excellent example of the Messrs. Fielden, who employ upwards of 2,000 hands, the factories heres are much better regulated, and greater regard paid to the health and morals of the workpeople than in most other places which I have visited. This firm have always worked their mills less time than that sanctioned by the Legislature, and have done their utmost to sustain the wages and mitigate the toil of their workpeople. Whenever a man meets with an accident they give him half wages during his illness, and pay for medical aid. They also change to less laborious and more healthy employment those who have become incapacitated for great exertion.

== Personal life ==
In 1811, he married Ann Grindrod of Rochdale, and bought and converted the "Coach and Horses" public house (opposite the Fieldens' Waterside Mill) as a family home named Dawson Weir. They had seven children: Jane (1814), Samuel (1816), Mary (1817), Ann (1819), John (1822), Joshua (1827) and Ellen (1829). Ann died in 1831; John remarried Elizabeth Dearden of Halifax in 1834; she survived him, dying in 1851.

Fielden was a deeply religious man but always nonconformist in his affiliations. Born into a Quaker family, by the age of seventeen he was a teacher in a Methodist Sunday School. When the Methodist Unitarians (later simply Unitarians) seceded from the Methodists, John went with them. A Unitarian Chapel was built in Bank Street, Todmorden c. 1823 but struggled financially. In 1828, John bought the chapel, paid off its debts and supported its running costs throughout his life. He taught in the Sunday School for many years, eventually becoming its Superintendent. He founded several other Sunday Schools (and to allow genuine compliance with factory legislation requirements on the education of mill-children there was a school in the Fielden mill in Todmorden). He is buried in the small burial ground of the chapel (which is now flats).

== Politics ==
Although their father had been a Tory, John and his brothers were Radicals. John in particular a follower of William Cobbett. The brothers supported in principle, and in practice (by donations from the family firm) both Parliamentary Reform, and factory reform (including Michael Thomas Sadler's Ten-Hour Bill).

=== Parliamentary reform ===
John was involved in Reform Bill agitation in Manchester. He was a member of the deputation which carried to London a petition calling upon the Commons to refuse to vote supply until the Reform Bill was passed. (Note: "The Manchester petition was the very first which was presented praying the House of Commons to stop the supplies until reform and a redress of grievances were obtained" said the Manchester Times– which also noted that the deputation had 'performed the journey in SEVENTEEN HOURS' (about six hours less than the normal stagecoach time), of which one and a half hours was accounted for by changes of horses) To resolve differences between local Radical and Whig supporters of the Bill he subsequently drafted (and at a great reform meeting moved adoption of) an address to the King declaring a preference for universal manhood suffrage but expressing willingness to settle for Lord Grey's Reform Bill. It being intended to form a Manchester Reform Association a sub-committee was set up to draft rules and a statement of objects: Fielden was a member of the sub-committee and responsible for the draft produced. On passage of the Reform Act, Fielden Brothers gave a dinner for their entire workforce:

Two thousand pounds weight of beef of the choicest cuts... between three and four hundred puddings weighing 7 or 8 lbs each, and a proportionate quantity of other dishes, bread and vegetables. There were 24 barrels or 3456 quarts of good brown stout Messrs. Fieldens... assisted at the tables. After the workpeople had dined, nearly 2000 persons not connected with the works partook of the remainder of the repast.

=== Election to Parliament ===
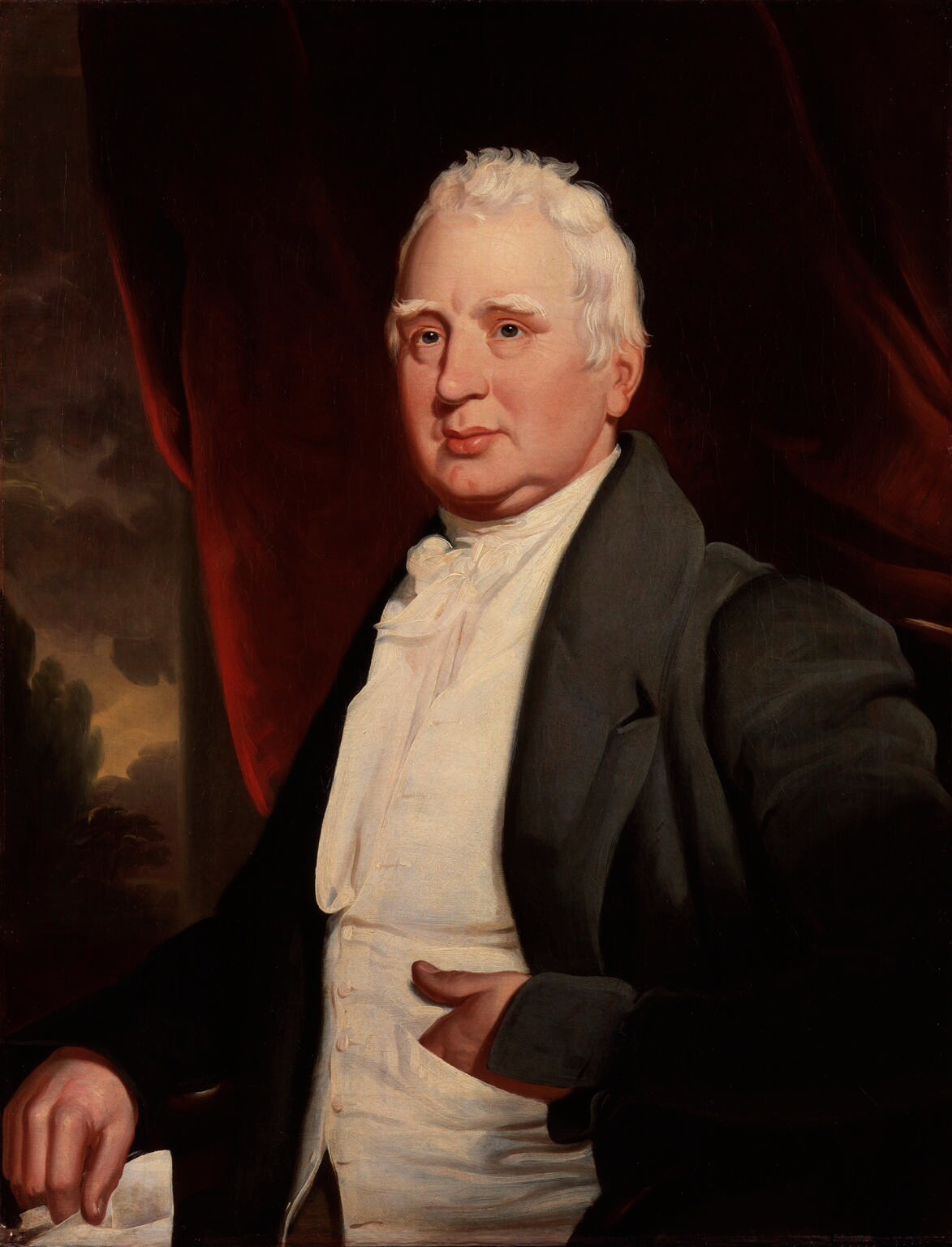
Portrait of William Cobbett by George Cooke, c. 1831

As early as July 1831, hoping the Reform Bill would soon be passed, the Manchester Times (a Radical organ) had turned its thoughts to who should be Radical candidates for Manchester and other nearby newly enfranchised boroughs, asking "Can the people of Rochdale send a better representative than their neighbour Mr John Fielden?". For Manchester itself, it thought that only a very moderate Radical would stand a chance of election As for William Cobbett he should not seek election: he would be wasted in Parliament; he was a better speaker than a debater, and a better writer than either. Nonetheless, an election committee for Cobbett was formed in Manchester (John's brother Thomas was chairman ) and invited Cobbett to a fund-raising dinner in his honour. (Note: There were about 180 attendees; admission was by ticket only, price 5 shillings (excluding wine)) Fielden was persuaded (against his objection that there were others better suited for the task) to take the chair for the meeting. His speech of welcome and introduction for Cobbett showed him to be a close adherent to Cobbett's views. Cobbett thought it an able speech, said as much in his own speech, and printed it two weeks running in his Weekly Political Register. (The Manchester Guardian criticised his views on banking and paper money; he responded in a series of three letters, promptly published (together with his speech) as The Mischiefs and Iniquities of Paper Money.)

Whilst preparations for Cobbett to stand for Manchester went ahead, Fielden decided to stand, not for Rochdale (which would elect only one MP), but for Oldham (which would elect two). He declared he would not wish to be an MP unless Cobbett had also been elected for Oldham or for some other place. Cobbett had high hopes of being elected for Manchester (failing that Preston) but allowed his name to go forward as the other Radical candidate for Oldham. "And is not the honour of being chosen by such a man as Mr John Fielden as his colleague… more than a reward for all that the hellish borough-mongers and their base and bloody press have been able to inflict upon me and upon my family?"

Although in ill-health Fielden then devoted his energy, influence, and resources to securing the election of both himself and Cobbett for Oldham. (Note: The total cost was about £200, of which £80 went on election expenses (cost of the hustings, polling clerks etc) so the campaign cost was about £120 (considered remarkably low). A policy of 'exclusive dealing' was adopted by the Radicals; ie letting local shopkeepers etc know that they would be boycotted should they fail to vote for the Radical candidates) Fielden and Cobbett were duly elected for Oldham, Fielden heading the poll. Cobbett came bottom of the poll in Manchester, with half the votes of the successful (Whig) candidates: he blamed this on the result of the Oldham election being known at an early stage of the Manchester poll.

=== "Mr Cobbett's ... political shadow" ===
Fielden did not have a powerful voice, (Note: "John Fielden, Cobbett's colleague, was eloquent and inaudible, as usual. What can possess such a man to come forward as a public speaker? He reminds one of a bag-piper without a bellows" said the Morning Post in an unfavourable account of proceedings at a Reform dinner at which Fielden spoke in 1836 Whig-Radicals at Halifax Disgraceful proceedings Morning Post 4 October 1836)

nor were his views congenial to more than a few MPs. Consequently, he found it difficult to command the House's attention:

it is not in my power to convey to you the difficulties which an unobtrusive member experiences in the discharge of his parliamentary duties - it must be seen to be believed - groaning, stamping, coughing, shuffling, in fact, a perfect cock-pit; and all this is experienced whilst statements are making as to the deprivations and sufferings of the poor, that would, or ought, to melt a heart of iron.

However, he acted as a reliable (Note: Generally reliable: when, also in 1833, Cobbett moved for a list of recipients of the money voted for the British Museum (money raised from the industrious poor to pay for the amusement of the idle, in his opinion) the preceding business was got through quicker than anticipated and "Mr Fielden had stepped out of the House to write some letters, so that there was nobody to second the motion") second to Cobbett (who unfortunately largely bore out the Manchester Times's prognosis). In 1833 Cobbett sought to provoke debate on currency policy by moving a resolution to remove Sir Robert Peel from the Privy Council. "A motion more frivolous, more absurd, and ...more disreputable to its author, was never made within the walls of either house of parliament." Fielden loyally seconded the motion (in a long speech, quite inaudible in the reporters' gallery because of the low tone in which he spoke and constant interruption). Cobbett and Fielden were tellers for the motion: only four other MPs voted for it: nearly 300 MPs voted against, then further voted to expunge it. The causes Cobbett took up included those close to Fielden's heart; 'the distress of the country' (Fielden was particularly concerned about Northern hand-loom weavers, rather than the agricultural labourers of the South with whose plight Cobbett was more familiar) and opposition to the New Poor Law. Fielden's support of Cobbett went beyond the purely Parliamentary: when Cobbett was on his deathbed in 1835, he was asked if he wished to draw up a will; he replied that he had made his arrangements, and "Mr Fielden knows all about it". At Cobbett's funeral, Fielden was in the first coach of mourners (with Cobbett's sons). Fielden later paid for a memorial tablet for Cobbett.

=== "The Curse of the Factory System" ===
In 1833 Fielden supported Lord Ashley's Ten-Hour Bill. Instead, Althorp's Act (the Factory Act 1833) was passed, Althorp commenting that if adult millworkers wanted to limit their hours of work they should do it themselves. Fielden joined with others to form a National Regeneration Society which intended to accumulate enough adherent millworkers to insist to mill-owners that adults as well as children should work no more than an eight-hour day.

This led to a split with those factory reform leaders still pinning their hopes in securing a ten-hour act by legislation. A plan to coordinate presentation of demands to mill owners in spring 1834 came to nothing. It amounted to formation of a national trade union; this was difficult at the best of times (which 1834, the year of the conviction of the Tolpuddle Martyrs, was not) and the union was broken up by pre-emptive action by employers

In 1835 he suggested that the government should set minimum piece-rates for hand-loom work. In response to hand-loom weavers doubting his sincerity and proposing instead other measures including a tax on power looms, (Note: because he owned power looms, as well as employing hand-loom weavers: his critics held the weavers' only true friend was Edward Baines, a serial sock-pupeteer, hence Baines was suspected to be behind the attack on Fielden) Fielden concurred with the desirability of many of the other measures, but held that the best tax on machinery was to limit the hours it could be worked.

In 1836 he opposed Poulet Thomson's Bill, speaking against it in Parliament and producing a pamphlet The Curse of the Factory System ("A Short Account of the Origin of Factory Cruelties; of the Attempts to Protect the Children by Law; of Their Present Sufferings; Our Duty Towards Them; Injustice of Mr Thomson's Bill; the Folly of the Political Economists; a Warning Against Sending the Children of the South into the Factories of the North") (Note: published by Anne Cobbett (daughter of William)) whose object he summarised as "to show that the workpeople have been and are cruelly treated; that they have not idly asked for protection, but that humanity and justice require it; that we shall do ourselves no harm by granting it to them; but always avowing, that I would cast manufactures to the winds, rather than see the workpeople enslaved, maimed, vitiated, and broken in constitution and in heart, as these pages will but too amply prove they now are."

He spoke of his own experience as a factory child forty years previous, and showed why the work was as (or more) onerous for children in the 1830s as he had found it in the 1790s:

As I have been personally and from an early age engaged in the operations connected with factory labour; that is to say, for about 40 years, a short account of my own experience may not be useless in this place, as it is this experience which teaches me to scoff at the representations of those who speak of the labour of factories as "very light," and "so easy, as to require no muscular exertion." I well remember being set to work in my father's mill when I was little more than ten years old; my associates, too, in the labour and in recreation are fresh in my memory. Only a few of them are now alive; some dying very young, others living to become men and women; but many of those who lived have died off before they had attained the age of fifty years, having the appearance of being much older, a premature appearance of age which I verily believe was caused by the nature of the employment in which they had been brought up. For several years after I began to work in the mill, the hours of labour at our works did not exceed ten in the day, winter and summer, and even with the labour of those hours, I shall never forget the fatigue I often felt before the day ended, and the anxiety of us all to be relieved from the unvarying and irksome toil we had gone through before we could obtain relief by such play and amusements as we resorted to when liberated from our work. I allude to this fact, because it is not uncommon for persons to infer, that, because the children who work in factories are seen to play like other children when they have time to do so, the labour is, therefore, light, and does not fatigue them. The reverse of this conclusion I know to be the truth. I know the effect which ten hours' labour had upon myself; I who had the attention of parents better able than those of my companions to allow me extraordinary occasional indulgence. And he knows very little of human nature who does not know, that, to a child, diversion is so essential, that it will undergo, even exhaustion in its amusements. I protest, therefore, against the reasoning, that, because a child is not brought so low in spirit as to be incapable of enjoying the diversions of a child, it is not worked to the utmost that its feeble frame and constitution will bear.

I well know, too, from my own experience, that the labour now undergone in the factories is much greater than it used to be, owing to the greater attention and activity required by the greatly-increased speed which is given to the machinery that the children have to attend to, when we compare it with what it was 30 to 40 years ago; and, therefore, I fully concur with the government commissioners, that a restriction to ten hours per day, is not a sufficient protection to children.

The work at which I was employed in my boyhood, while it was limited to ten hours a day, was similar to the work that children have to do in the woollen mills of Yorkshire at the present time, with this difference, that wool is the manufacture in the Yorkshire mills to which I allude, and the manufacture that I was employed in was cotton, the mode of manufacturing which has been altogether changed since that period by the improvements made in machinery. These are facts which I mention, because the labour of the child in the woollen now, is what its labour in the cotton was then, the work being done on what are called "billies" and "jennies"; and I mention them, too, because the woollen manufacturers would have it believed that the work of children in woollen mills is still lighter than that in the cotton factories, and that children, much younger than those whose labour is now limited to eight hours a day, may without injury to their health, be worked 69 hours per week. Indeed, it is on this, that the Yorkshire mill-owners have petitioned the House of Commons to allow them to work children of eight years of age as many as 72 hours in the week, or 12 hours in the day.

The 'curse of the factory system' was not that the system existed, but that it had been left unregulated. Consequently, improvements in machinery allowed no improvement in hours and conditions for the workforce; instead there was a race to the bottom:

Most of the masters are obliged to admit the excessive hours of labour imposed on children, and the ministers have done it in the most solemn manner; but they cannot interfere with the labour, the "free labour" of the adult, because that is against sound principle! According to their own showing, it is a choice of evils; but, contrary to reason, contrary to all acknowledged principle and to universal practice, they would choose the greater: they would overwork the child, though nature forbids it, rather than shorten the labour of the adult, who is also overworked. In short, their "principle", their true and scarcely disguised "principle " is the principle of self against nature. Here, then, is the "curse" of our factory system: as improvements in machinery have gone on, the "avarice of masters" has prompted many to exact more labour from their hands than they were fitted by nature to perform, and those who have wished for the hours of labour to be less for all ages than the legislature would even yet sanction, have had no alternative but to conform more or less to the prevailing practice, or abandon the trade altogether

=== New Poor Law ===
Fielden had voted against the Poor Law Amendment Act 1834 at every stage; he then opposed its implementation in Todmorden and in Oldham. He was the only MP present at the great Yorkshire Anti-Poor Law Meeting at Hartshead Moor in May 1837 (and spoke at that meeting.) In 1837-8 he was a member of a Commons committee taking evidence on the working of the New Poor Law; when the committee reported favourably Fielden complained that it had taken evidence chiefly from members of the Poor Law Commission and from Poor Law Guardians known to be supportive of the new regime and that his attempts to submit them to hostile questioning had been obstructed. In Parliament, he moved repeatedly for repeal of the 1834 act: "so long as he had a seat in that House, he would by speech and vote resist a law which was based upon the false and wicked assertion that the labouring people of England, or any material part of them, were inclined to idleness and vice" but he was always defeated by overwhelming majorities, most MPs with misgivings about the administration of the New Poor Law thinking its complete repeal too drastic a step. In 1842, when a Poor Law Amendment Act was required to extend the life of the Poor Law Commission, Fielden repeatedly attempted to obstruct this by procedural means: "Mr. Fielden moved that the Chairman do leave the Chair. Sir R. Peel protested against the course which the hon. Member was pursuing. He hoped that hon. Members would not thus endanger one of the most important privileges of the House. The course now adopted was calculated to obstruct the progress of legislation, to bring the House into great discredit, and to impair their authority as a deliberative assembly"

Fielden attempted to prevent the New Poor Law from being implemented in his area, threatening to close the family firm down unless the Guardians of the Todmorden Poor Law Union resigned. When they did not the Fielden mills duly closed, throwing nearly 3,000 out of work. The Guardians stood firm, troops were moved into the area, and after a week Fieldens re-opened (paying their employees as normal for the week not worked)

However, some townships refused to recognise the authority of the Guardians. and instructed (or intimidated) their 'overseer of the poor' to ignore the Guardians' instructions. Two constables were sent from Halifax to distrain the goods of an overseer fined for disobeying the Guardians. The constables were surrounded by a mob summoned from two of Fielden's mills (supplemented by navvies building the Manchester & Leeds Railway), roughly treated and made to promise never to return. The following week a mob again gathered in the belief that another attempt at distraint was to be made; when this did not happen, they attacked the houses of various guardians and supporters of the New Poor Law, causing damage put at over £1000.

The Manchester Guardian thought it significant that a JP in residence (meaning Fielden) had made no effort to quell the riot, even though the rioters had marched past his front door. Fielden was not a magistrate; he had been nominated in 1836, but made no attempt to qualify as he would 'have to sit in judgement on men driven to crime by poverty' which the Government had refused to relieve; furthermore, he had not been in Todmorden on the day of the riot. The Guardian thought this to also be significant, but Fielden was never implicated in the riots, although he was ostentatious in his non-cooperation with attempts to identify and arrest ringleaders and in his attempts to get those arrested released on bail.

=== Chartism ===
Fielden concurred with the aims of Chartism, and throughout was a good friend to the movement and to its more moderate leaders. He refused, however, to be associated with anything going beyond 'moral force' (meetings and petitions). Consequently, he was actively associated with the Chartist movement in 1838–1839, seeing its National Petition as a more hopeful route to reform than his efforts in Parliament: "He was sick of this piecemeal labouring for the last six years to benefit the people. In all his attempts he had failed…" He was chairman of a monster Chartist meeting at Kersal Moor (Manchester racecourse) in September, at which he warned his hearers against being bought-off by piecemeal reforms. This culminated with his involvement in the presentation of the National Petition to Parliament. When the National Petition was rejected, Fielden advised that another petition should be produced, but this time with greater care to collect only valid signatures; no representative legislature could for long withstand repeated petitioning. His advice was rejected as being a slow and uncertain route to success, and the Chartists turned towards 'physical force' methods (a general strike, or the acquisition of arms with the inherent threat of their eventual use, rather than an imminent uprising). Fielden was opposed to such methods (Note: on several grounds; morality of coercion, incompatibility of role as MP with support of extra-Parliamentary coercion, and little likelihood of success) and severed all formal links with the movement. Henceforth, he attended only meetings for reform on a single issue, and opposed any introduction of other Chartist demands into the meeting resolutions: any association of a specific reform with the Charter would drive away non-Chartist sympathisers.

=== Ten Hour Act ===
Fielden was critical of many aspects of the operation of the 1833 Act. Amongst its inherent problems was that it defined "children" and "young people" by age, but did so before there was any state system for registration of births; consequently age had to be certified by examination and a subjective judgement by surgeons. To assist this, a factory inspector promulgated a regulation using height as an objective test. Fielden objected; the height criterion – unreviewed by Parliament - undermined Parliament's intentions – Fielden's nine-year-old son Joshua was tall enough to be certified as thirteen. More generally, Fielden publicised cases in which magistrates were reluctant to convict millowners of breaches of the Act, and keen to award costs against those bringing unsuccessful prosecutions. He opposed attempts to weaken the Act and continued to press for further restriction of working hours. In Parliament, Lord Ashley was the principal advocate of a Ten-Hour Act; his vulnerability (and that of other benevolent Conservatives) to the accusation of muddle-headed interference in matters he did not understand was greatly reduced by the support given him by Fielden: " They might accuse... (Lord John Manners or Lord Ashley) ... with wild enthusiasm or measureless philanthropy, and with a want of that interest which a stable Government must feel for every class of the community. But they could not accuse the late Sir Robert Peel, or the present hon. Member for Oldham, with visionary views. Both in the one case and the other, the parties must have been deeply interested in the prosperity of the manufacturing body." argued a supporter of Ashley's Bill of 1846.

In 1846, Lord Ashley introduced a Ten-Hour Bill . However, this came two days after Peel's abandonment of the Corn Laws: Ashley supported Peel's volte-face but although he was not pledged to his Dorsetshire constituents to support the Corn Laws, considered that it had been an understanding with them that he would. He, therefore, resigned from Parliament rather than vote against his personal views or the wishes of his constituents; later further clarifying the situation by saying that he would not contest the by-election brought about by his resignation. Fielden then took charge of Ashley's Factory Bill. The bill proposed a one-year experiment with an eleven-hour day before moving to a ten-hour day: however some of the bill's supporters appeared to envisage settling for an eleven-hour limit: when an opponent contrasted this with Fielden's position of 'Ten Hours and no compromise' Fielden denied that he had said anything about a compromise. (Note: Out of Parliament, however, Fielden had said (in passing) that the movement should not settle for a minute short of ten hours.) There was considerable agitation in the country for a Ten-Hour Bill and more petitions were presented to Parliament supporting the 1846 bill than for repeal of the Corn Laws; however the bill was defeated at Second Reading 193–203. Fielden's advice to the Short Time Committees was that they should continue to press for ten hours, submit a Ten-Hour Bill again in the next session, and reject any eleven-hour compromise; other MPs associated with the movement (such as Charles Hindley) were more prepared to consider an eleven-hour compromise. To answer two arguments which opponents of the 1846 Bill had made much of, meetings (twenty-one in all) were held in most of the major textile towns of Northern England (generally addressed by one or more of Lord Ashley, Fielden or Oastler): all were well attended, and at each motions were passed to declare that

- what was sought was a ten-hour day (not an eleven-hour one)
- that a reduction from a twelve-hour day to a ten-hour day was sought, even if this meant there was a corresponding reduction in wages

In January 1847, Fielden introduced much the same bill as Ashley's Bill of the previous year. The 1847 Bill passed its Second Reading by 195 votes to 87 and its Third Reading by 151 to 88.

=== Representation of Oldham after Cobbett ===
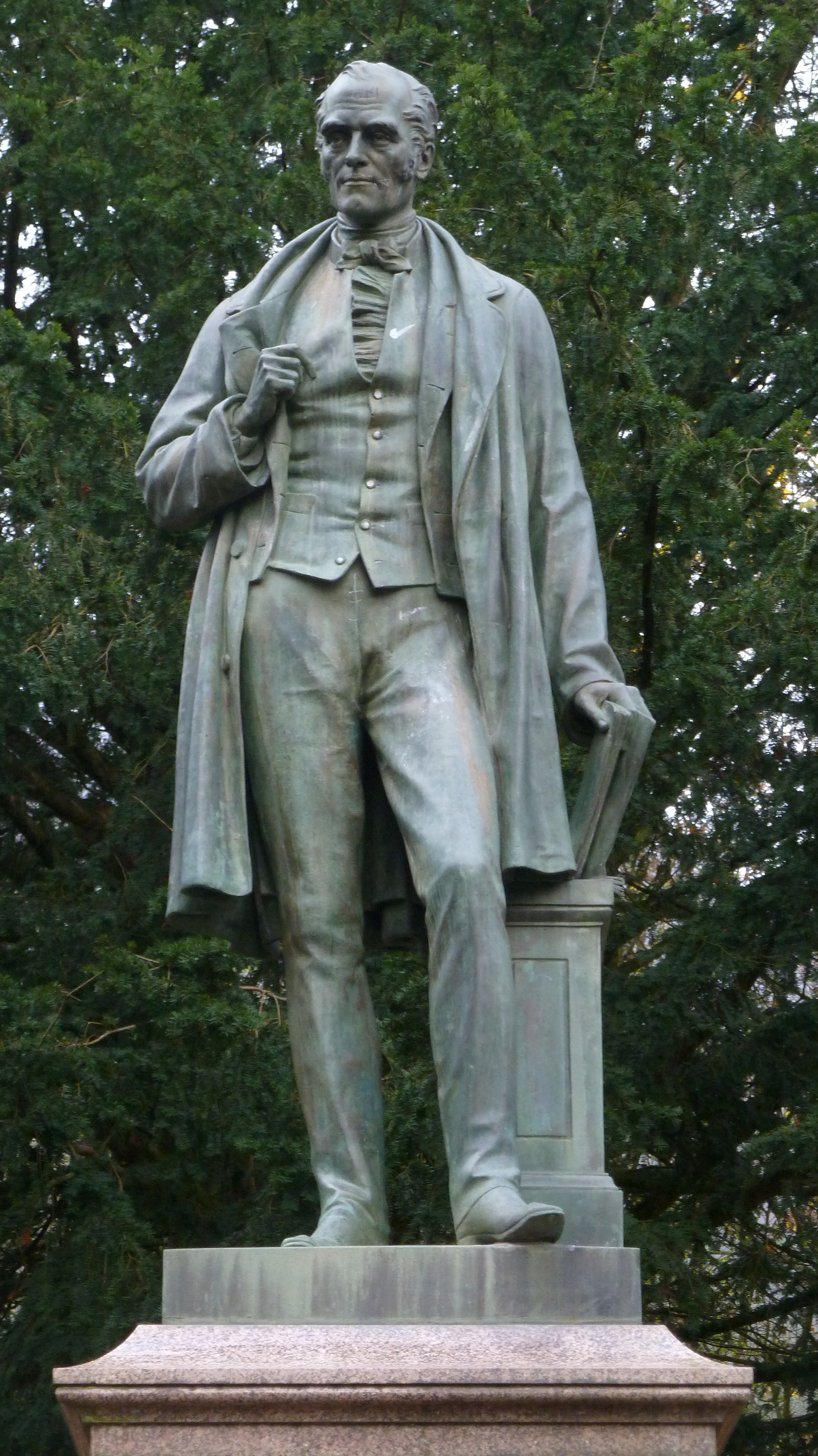
Statue of Fielden by John Henry Foley (1869), Centre Vale Park, Todmorden

At the by-election at Oldham consequent upon Cobbett's death, Fielden supported the candidature of John Morgan Cobbett (one of Cobbett's sons). J. M. Cobbett (like his father) favoured reform of the Church of England, but not its disestablishment, and thus was not entirely satisfactory to Dissenting electors. Feargus O'Connor presented himself at the hustings as a more genuinely Radical candidate: he withdrew but not before alleging that Fielden had not been straightforward with O'Connor and had been determined to impose the younger Cobbett on the constituency. Cobbett lost narrowly to a local 'Liberal Conservative' for whom Hansard does not record any speeches in the two years he sat for Oldham. In the 1837 General Election a fellow-Radical (General Johnson) was elected alongside Fielden. When Johnson announced he would not stand in the 1847 general election William Johnson Fox, a noted anti-Corn Law orator came forward as a Radical replacement for Gen Johnson; Fielden said he would only stand again if J.M. Cobbett was the other Radical candidate. Four candidates stood at the election; three Radicals (Fox, Fielden, Cobbett), and a Tory (Duncuft). Many electors cast their two votes for Duncuft and Fox (not natural political allies); neither Fielden nor Cobbett were elected. Fielden thought his defeat to have been engineered by Manchester School laissez-faire liberals in revenge for his success in obtaining a Ten-Hour Act, others thought that he had brought it upon himself by his 'dictation' of the choice of candidate: other local Ten-Hour advocates, such as Joseph Brotherton at Salford had had no similar problem. (Note: Brotherton, however, could be more confident of the support of Dissenters, having voted on religious issues as they would have wished: against the creation of a new Anglican diocese of Manchester, and against the Education Grant (money to be disbursed via the Privy Council on support of schools giving education, including religious education, in most cases by the Church of England). Fielden had not: he had not voted in any division on the Bishop of Manchester; he had voted for the Education Grant. A public meeting of Oldham dissenters in June 1847 passed a resolution not to vote for anyone who had voted for the Education Grant. There was more blue water between Fox and Fielden on the education issue than on factory reform. In 1850 Fox introduced a Bill for secular education; during passage of the Compromise Act of 1850 he voted for the amendment to retain a 58-hour week.) Fielden's defeat was part of a more general collapse of the Oldham Radical political machine.

== Last years ==
By 1847, Fielden was in poor health. Soon after his defeat at Oldham, he retired from business and (officially) from politics, moving from Todmorden to Skeynes Park near Edenbridge, Kent. (Note: Bought whilst still an MP, but no earlier than 1844. The estate passed to his daughter Mary, who subsequently married J M Cobbett, whom she outlived. When the estate was sold on her death, it was said to be of 411 acres (including a farm with sitting tenant)) Skeynes was convenient for London, and when problems emerged with implementation of the Ten-Hour Act and its potential circumvention by adoption of a relay system Fielden became involved in repeated lobbying of the Prime Minister and Home Secretary. These continued exertions on behalf of the millworkers were said to have hastened his death, aged 65, in May 1849. Fielden's children consequently took a poor view of the Compromise Act 1850 (which retroceded some of the gains of their father's Ten Hours Act in order to end the relay system), and of Lord Shaftesbury who had forced the Compromise Act upon the Ten-Hour movement, thus (in the Fieldens' eyes) betraying the cause for which their father had given everything for two decades.

== Children ==
- Jane (1814) died 11 October 1846.
- Samuel ('Black Sam') (1816 - 1889): Principal partner in the family firm. On his death the Manchester Guardian noted that he was from 'first to last a Radical Reformer', but 'was not and never desired to be "a public man"'. In conjunction with his brothers John and Joshua, he built and endowed the magnificent Todmorden Unitarian Church at a cost of about £45,000, and Todmorden Town Hall at even greater cost. (Both are now Grade I listed buildings). He had donated liberally to national, regional and local charities (including the National Lifeboat Institution and Owens College Manchester). He was a director of, and the largest shareholder in, the Lancashire and Yorkshire Railway and left an estate worth £1.1m net, roughly equivalent in purchasing power to £120m in 2011.
- Mary: Married (1851) John Morgan Cobbett who had twice stood unsuccessfully for Oldham. Cobbett was a barrister, a Sussex JP and in his later years chairman of Quarter Sessions for West Sussex. He served as MP for Oldham 1852-1865: outside Oldham he was generally taken to be sitting as a Liberal, despite having been elected in 1852 as the Radical half of a Radical-Tory alliance, and in 1857 whilst admitting to supporting Lord Palmerston being careful to note that the Liberal Chief Whip had no confidence in him. In 1865 he stood unsuccessfully in conjunction with a Conservative and was opposed by two avowed Liberals. He was again elected as one of the MPs for Oldham in 1872, and served until his death in 1877 as an acknowledged Conservative (but one calling for annual Parliaments and manhood suffrage).
- Ann: Married Henry Brocklehurst, son of John Brocklehurst, MP for Macclesfield. Both Ann and Henry died 1870; their two youngest children being effectively adopted by their uncle John Fielden of Grimston Park. One of the other children of the marriage, John Fielden Brocklehurst, was raised to the peerage as Lord Ranksborough in 1914.
- John: Chairman of the Todmorden Local Board, and a JP. Married twice; firstly a Unitarian Power Loom Weaver, secondly the daughter of an Anglican clergyman. An accident at a meeting of the Bedale Hunt in 1873 confined him to a wheelchair thereafter. Not a public man, but having bought Grimston Park an estate near Tadcaster served for a year as High Sheriff of Yorkshire and launched an orphaned Brocklehurst niece in Yorkshire county society. A Conservative and an Anglican in his later years.
- Joshua: Married Ellen Brocklehurst, a niece of John Brocklehurst. From 1868 to 1880 Conservative MP for Eastern Division of West Riding, arguing Conservatism was a better home than Gladstonian Liberalism for a Cobbettite Radical such as himself. Bought and moved to Nutfield Priory, near Reigate in the early 1870s. Briefly a director of the South Eastern Railway, resigning after objecting to the chairman's autocratic regime. Retired from Parliament because of ill health which caused a prolonged absence from Parliament in 1876-1877 and dogged him to his death in 1887, leading to him wintering in Cannes and cruising in his steam yacht Zingara for his health. As a result of this extravagant lifestyle his estate when he died was valued at only slightly over half a million pounds.
- Ellen: Married William Charge Booth of Oran Hall Catterick; two daughters (1862, 1864); died 1864.

== Notes ==
Parliament of the United Kingdom
| New constituency | Member of Parliament for Oldham; 1832–1847; With: William Cobbett 1832–1835; John Frederick Lees 1835–1837; William Augustus Johnson 1837–1847 | Succeeded by John Duncuft and William Johnson Fox |
