= Church Lane =

Church Lane may refer to:

- Church Lane (Brighton Beach Line)
- Church Lane, Letterkenny
- Church Lane, Oldham
- Church Lane (Randallstown)
- Church Lane Flood Meadow
- Church Laneham, in England
