= Frederick Spinks =

British politician

Frederick Spinks MP

Member of Parliament for Oldham
- In office 6 February 1874 – 2 April 1880 Serving with John Morgan Cobbett (1874–1877); J. T. Hibbert (1877–1880)
- Preceded by: John Morgan Cobbett; J. T. Hibbert
- Succeeded by: J. T. Hibbert; Edward Stanley

Personal details
- Born: 27 December 1816
- Died: 27 December 1899 (aged 83)
- Party: Conservative

Frederick Lowten Spinks (27 December 1816 – 27 December 1899), known as Serjeant Spinks, was a British lawyer and Conservative Party politician.

He was the last serjeant-at-law at the English bar (the last English serjeant, was Nathaniel Lindley, Baron Lindley, who was a judge). The legal historian Patrick Polden described him as "rather undistinguished".

Spinks first stood for election in Oldham at the 1865 general election, but was unsuccessful, and this fate was repeated in 1868. He finally secured the seat in 1874, but was defeated again in 1880.

Parliament of the United Kingdom
Preceded by John Morgan Cobbett; J. T. Hibbert	Member of Parliament for Oldham; 1874–1880; With: J. T. Hibbert (1877–1880); John Morgan Cobbett (1874–1877)	Succeeded by J. T. Hibbert; Edward Stanley
