= William Johnson Fox =

British Unitarian minister (1786–1864)

The Reverend William Johnson Fox
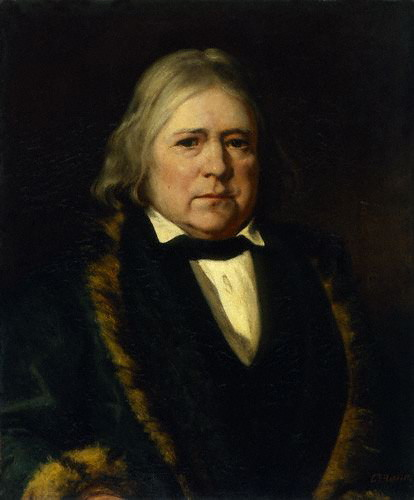
- William Johnson Fox by his daughter Eliza Bridell Fox
- Born: 1 March 1786; Wrentham, near Southwold, Suffolk, England
- Died: 3 June 1864 (aged 78); London, England

William Johnson Fox (1 March 1786 – 3 June 1864) was an English Unitarian minister, politician, and political orator.

== Early life ==
Fox was born at Uggeshall Farm, Wrentham, near Southwold, Suffolk on 1 March 1786. His parents were strict Calvinists. When he was still young, his father quit farming. After time at a chapel school, Fox became a weaver's boy, an errand-boy, and in 1799, a bank clerk. An autodidact, he entered prize competitions.

From September 1806 Fox trained for the Independent ministry, at Homerton College. His tutor there was John Pye Smith, the Congregational theologian. Early in 1810 he took charge of a congregation at Fareham in Hampshire. Failing to make a small seceding congregation there viable, he left within two years to become minister of the Unitarian chapel at Chichester.

== South Place Chapel circle ==
In 1817 Fox moved to London, becoming minister of Parliament Court Chapel. In 1824 he moved the congregation to South Place Chapel, in Finsbury on the edge of the City of London, which had been built specifically for him. Around Fox and the chapel there gathered a group of progressive thinkers, including feminists and, through William Lovett, some adherents of Chartism. The circle included Sophia Dobson Collet, who saw some of Fox's sermons into print; Mary Leman Gillies, who wrote on women's rights; and Caroline Ashurst Stansfeld, whose marriage to James Stansfeld was conducted by Fox.

Fox's position as a leading Unitarian minister was jeopardized in 1834 when he left his wife for one of his wards, and became an advocate of freer divorce. The Chapel's committee, led by Thomas Field Gibson's father Thomas Gibson, accepted Fox's resignation, which led to Fox's removal from the British Unitarian ministry and a secession of fifty families from the Chapel. He set up a new household in the Craven Hill area of Bayswater and re-established himself as a preacher of rationalism. Charles Hardwick grouped Fox with Theodore Parker and Robert William Mackay as proponents of "absolute religion". Fox's public presence became increasingly that of a commentator on social and political matters. The South Place chapel itself eventually lost its identification with Unitarianism, becoming the South Place Ethical Society.

== Politician ==
As a supporter of the Anti-Corn-Law movement, Fox won celebrity as an impassioned orator and journalist, and from 1847 to 1862 he intermittently represented Oldham in Parliament as a Radical and later a Liberal.

== Death ==
Fox died 3 June 1864, in London.

== Works ==
He was editor of the Monthly Repository, and a frequent contributor to the Westminster Review, and published works on political and religious topics. An edition of his Works was edited by William Ballantyne Hodgson and Henry James Slack, and appeared from 1865.

== Family ==
Fox was a friend of radical journalist Benjamin Flower. On Flower's death in 1829, his two daughters, Eliza Flower and Sarah Fuller Flower Adams, became Fox's wards. Fox separated from his wife Eliza nee Florance, a daughter of James Florance, in the 1830s, and, causing much scandal, apparently set up home with Eliza Flower and his children. Following the separation from his wife, Fox brought up his ward himself, living first in Stamford Hill and later Bayswater. After 1846, William J. Fox and his wife Eliza nee Florance were reunited for a time before his death on 3 June 1864. One of Fox's daughters, also named Eliza, married Frederick Lee Bridell. Both were accomplished artists.

== Sources ==
Parliament of the United Kingdom
| Preceded by John Fielden and William Augustus Johnson | Member of Parliament for Oldham; 1847–1852; With: John Duncuft | Succeeded by John Duncuft and John Morgan Cobbett |
| Preceded by John Duncuft and John Morgan Cobbett | Member of Parliament for Oldham; 1852–1857; With: John Morgan Cobbett | Succeeded by James Platt and John Morgan Cobbett |
| Preceded by James Platt and John Morgan Cobbett | Member of Parliament for Oldham; 1857–1862; With: John Morgan Cobbett | Succeeded by James Platt and J. T. Hibbert |
