= James Platt (MP) =

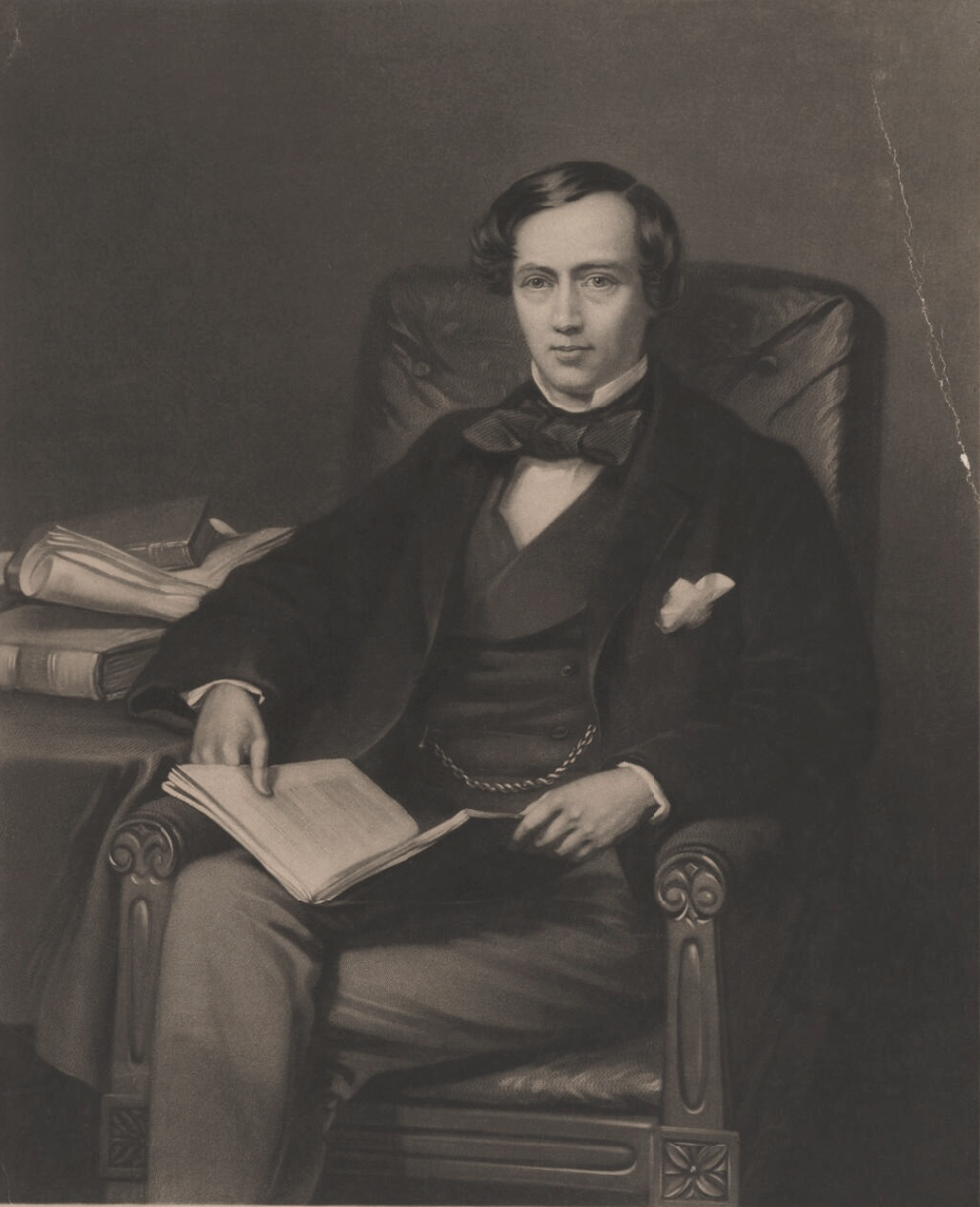
- Platt's Tomb in Chadderton Cemetery, Oldham

Member of Parliament for Oldham
- In office 31 March 1857 – 27 August 1857 Serving with John Morgan Cobbett
- Preceded by: John Morgan Cobbett; William Johnson Fox
- Succeeded by: John Morgan Cobbett; William Johnson Fox

Personal details
- Born: 1823
- Died: 27 August 1857 (aged 34) Ashway Gap, Oldham
- Cause of death: Gunshot wound
- Resting place: Chadderton Cemetery, Oldham
- Party: Radical

James Platt (1823 – 27 August 1857) was a British Radical politician and manufacturer.

== Manufacturing business ==
Alongside his brother John, Platt was a partner in the world's largest machine-making firm, Platt Brothers; the firm—established by their father Henry in partnership with Elijah Hibbert—created machinery for the textile industry in the UK and overseas. In 1854, the Platt brothers bought out the Hibberts' interest.

== Political career ==
Platt was active in local politics, taking a leading role in successfully campaigning for Oldham to be incorporated as a municipal borough. This happened in 1849, with Platt being elected as one of the town's first councillors, holding that position until 1852 when he was defeated. However, he returned to the council in 1853, and then chosen as an alderman in 1856. He was particularly active on educational issues, noting that "ignorance is... the parent and perpetuation of error and misery".

His council career aided his parliamentary career, allowing him to be elected Radical MP for Oldham in 1857. Supporters of the incumbent Radical William Johnson Fox approached both Platt and his brother in 1856 to stand for election, with James accepting. However, local divisions led to a rival candidate John Morgan Cobbett also standing in the radical interest. During campaigning, Platt emphasised his local roots, and said he supported extension of education, the ballot, shorter parliaments, the redistribution of seats, universal suffrage, disestablishment of the church, and admission of Jews to Parliament.

During the course of the campaign, it became apparent Platt would succeed in taking second place, with Fox pushed into third, leading Platt to offer to retire in favour of Fox. This was not pursued, leading to Fox losing his seat. However, Platt's tenure was cut shot by his accidental death just four months later.

== Death ==
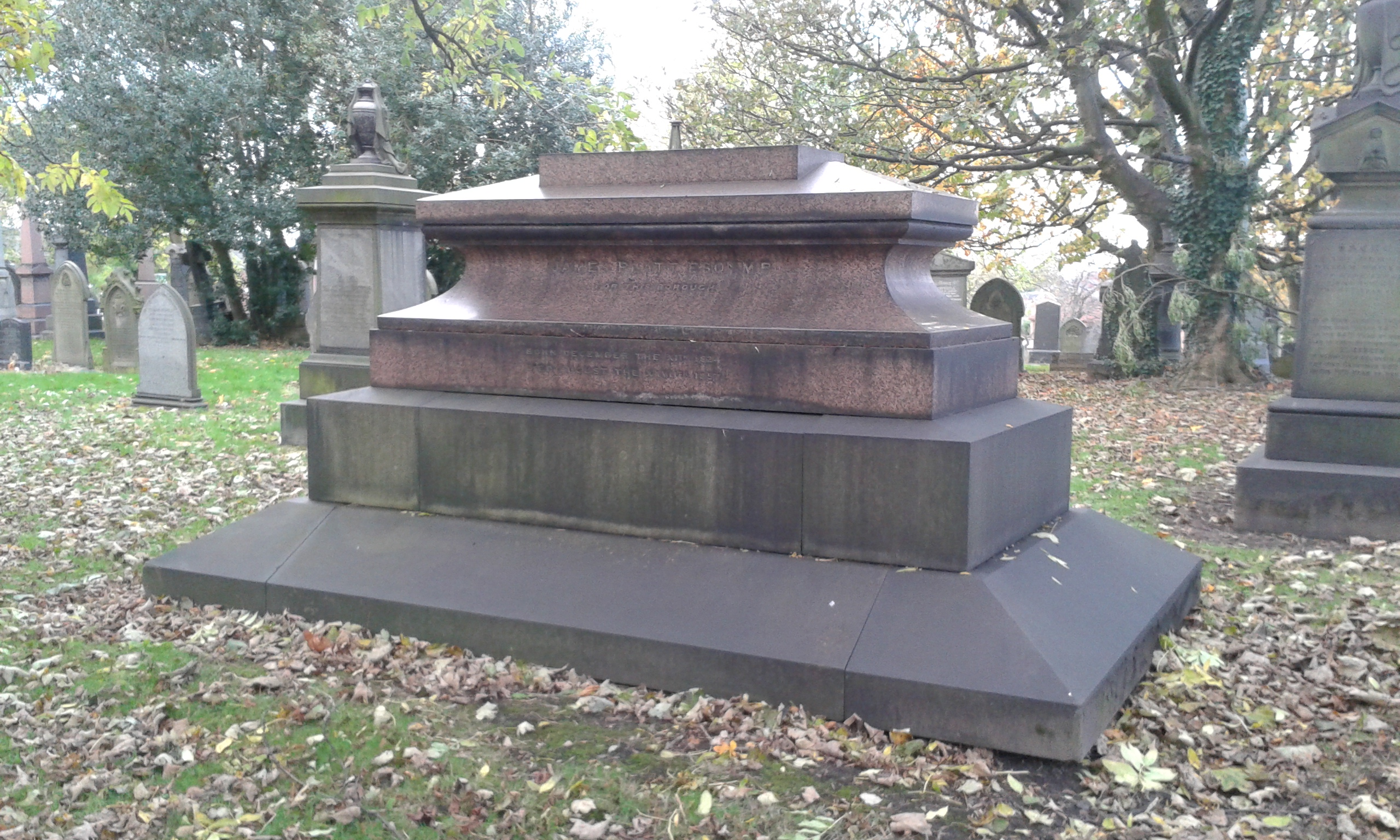
Tomb of James Platt, Chadderton Cemetery, Oldham

Platt was killed after a shooting accident on Saddleworth Moor while on an excursion with Oldham mayor Josiah Radcliffe and Joshua Radcliffe, both of whom were also his relatives. The trio left Ashway Gap, Platt's hunting Lodge, at around 11:00 on 27 August 1857 but, at around 13:15 when in a gully, Josiah Radcliffe, who had presided over Platt's election, stumbled causing his gun to fire, the bullet hitting Platt in the calf of his right leg. Although Platt was immediately bandaged, he suffered extensive blood loss and, after being moved to his home in Ashway Gap, he died between 14:00 and 15:00. His death caused "the deepest grief" and a "gloom" over the local population.

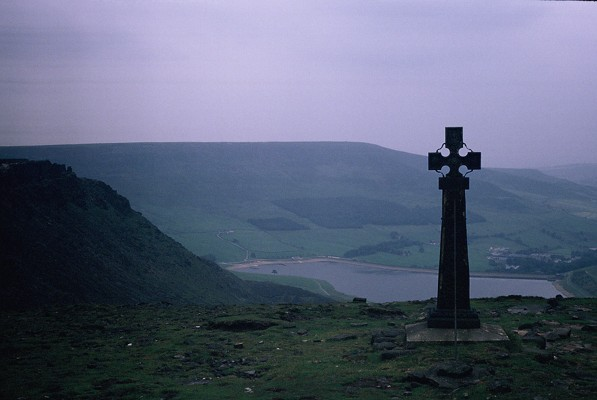
Ashworth Cross 1857 Memorial to James Platt MP

After his death, and although he had only made three contributions to Parliament, Platt was celebrated in the media—including the Manchester Examiner and The Times—as a "rising man" who would have been likely to "distinguish himself greatly". Platt was laid to rest in a tomb at Chadderton Cemetery in Oldham on 2 September 1857.

His brother, John Platt, followed his footsteps into the seat, elected as a Liberal for the same seat at the 1865 general election.

Parliament of the United Kingdom
Preceded by John Morgan Cobbett; William Johnson Fox	Member of Parliament for Oldham; March 1857–October 1857; With: John Morgan Cobbett	Succeeded by John Morgan Cobbett; William Johnson Fox
