= Church Lane, Oldham =

Streets in Greater Manchester, England

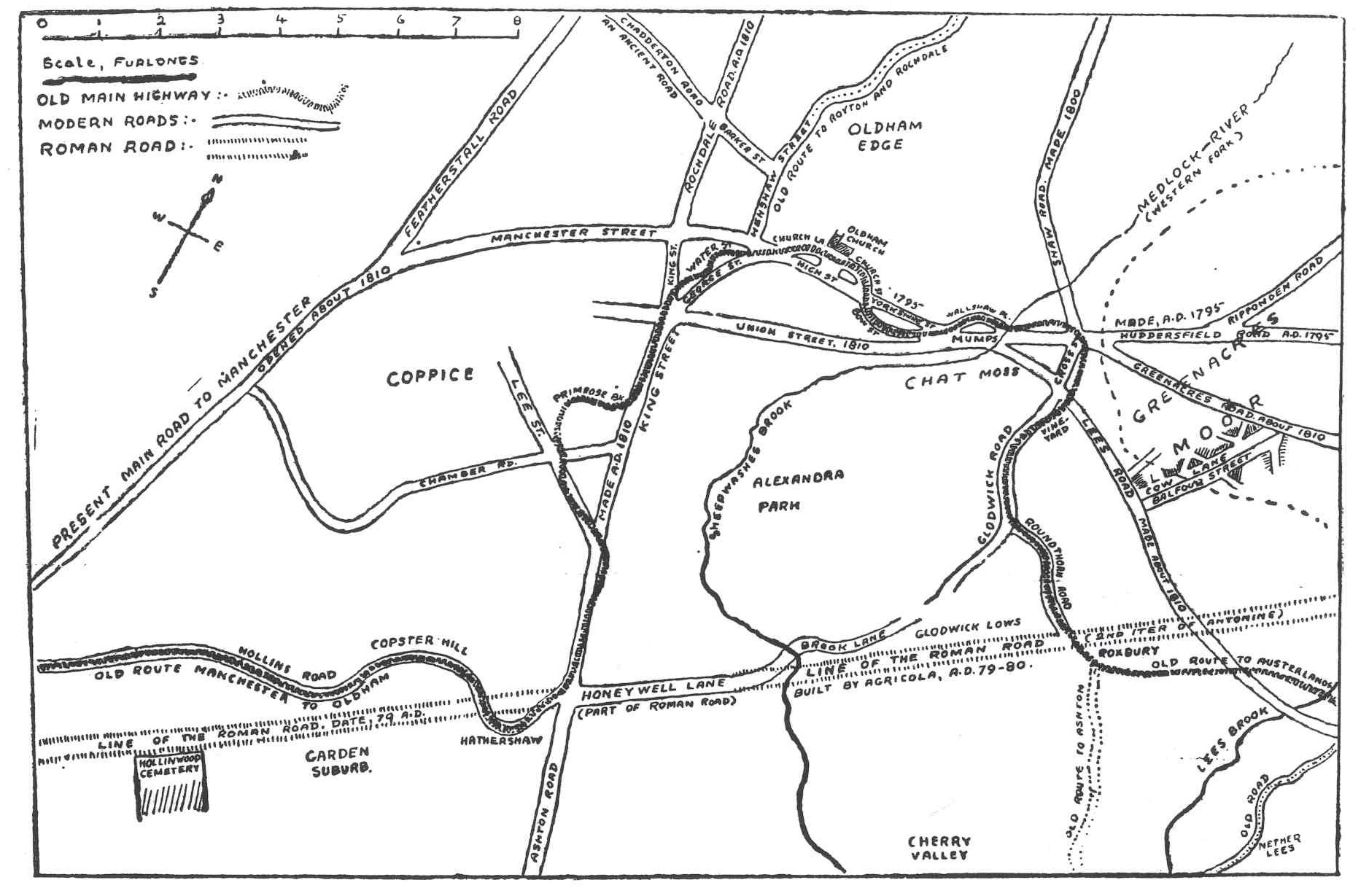
Map of ancient routes through Oldham

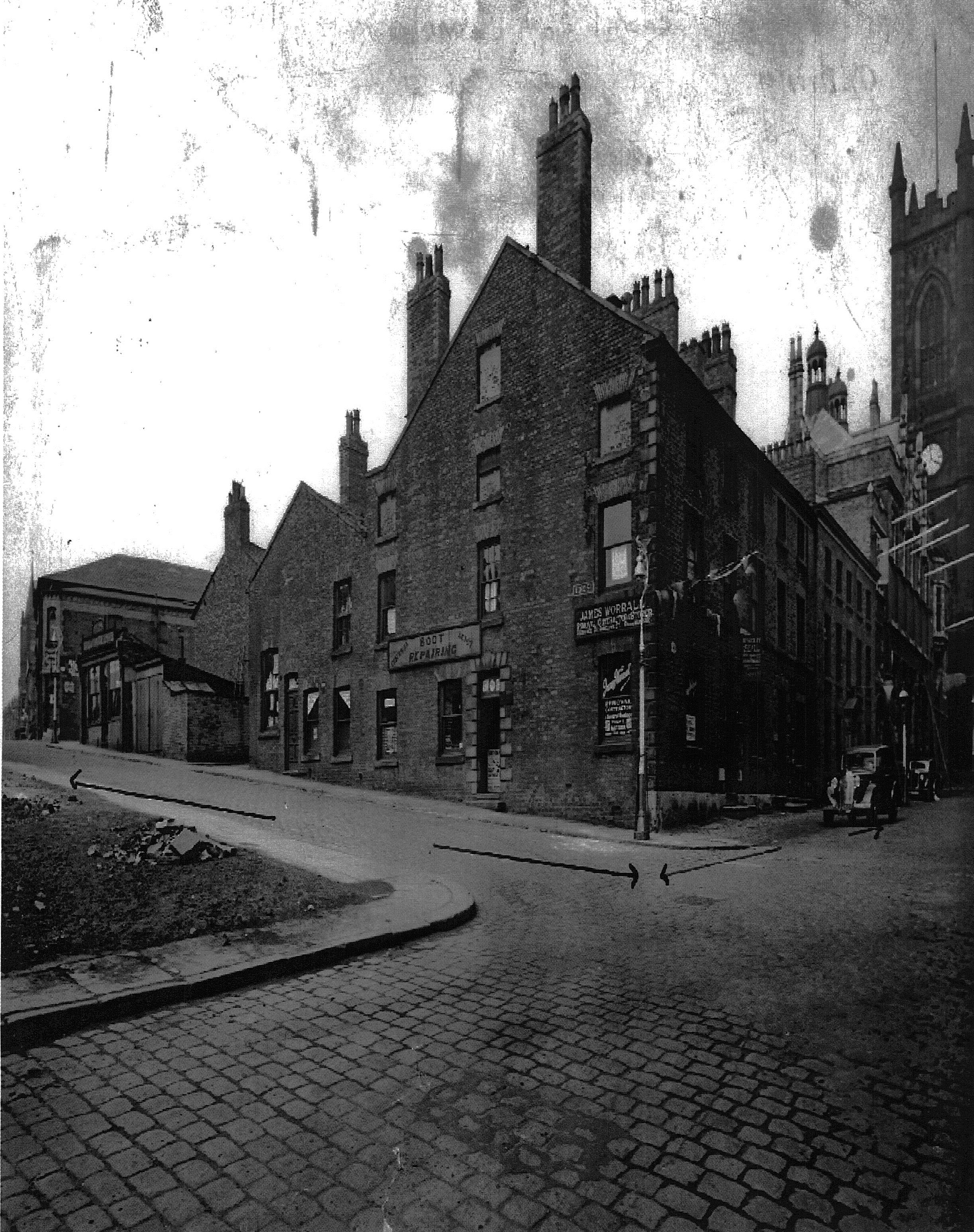
Church Lane c. 1940

Church Lane is one of the oldest streets in Oldham, Greater Manchester, England, and one of the few that are still cobbled. It is the only part of the town centre that has survived decades of redevelopment. As a result, all of the buildings on the lane have been designated by English Heritage as Grade II listed buildings. The lane is significant as it was once part of the prehistoric route through the town which meandered from Hathershaw, via Water Street, Market Place, Church Lane, Church Street, Bow Street, Wallshaw Place, Fowleach, Cross Street then on through Hey to Yorkshire.

Its existence and name are due to its proximity to Oldham Parish Church. The current church building is a relatively recent addition but there have been churches on that site since the 11th century. Archaeologists recognise Church Lane to predate the Romans and a road that is "probably as old as human life in this corner of England."

The route of Church Lane passed in front of the old church. It was common in ancient times for the road to pass to the south side of the church or temple as that route was in the sun. To pass to the north would fall within the shadow of the church and was seen as taboo. There is still a superstitious prejudice in parts of England against the north side of a church with many important tombs and monuments being placed to the south.

In 1785, Church Lane was paved at a cost of £20 probably due to one of Oldham's richest men, John Lees, being a resident and owner of a business on the lane and in anticipation of the new turnpike road that was planned.

In 1805 the churchyard was enlarged and Church Lane became a cul-de-sac severing the ancient route for ever. The previous continuance of the road (Church Street) was lowered by 6 feet and became an extension of the recently created Church Terrace.

== Turnpike Road ==
Despite the Turnpike Act 1734, Oldham had no turnpike road to Manchester for another 56 years and Church Lane remained part of the main street through the town. But following the creation of the Manchester, Oldham and Ripponden Trust and a further Act of Parliament the turnpike was constructed. The first regular coach service to Manchester came into operation in October 1790, with a journey time of over 2 hours and a fare 2s.8d (about 13p), with half fare for travellers on top of the coach. Church lane bustled with businesses servicing the new road, the most famous of which was the Coach and Horses at 3 Church Lane (known as The Masons Arms between 1804 and 1811). Above the door was a Latin inscription: "Nunc mei, mox hujus, Sead postea, nescio cujus" which translates as "Today 'tis mine, Tomorrow, thine, but whose next day I cannot say". The pub closed in 1920 but the building survived for a few years as the headquarters of the British Legion until it was demolished in July 1931 to make way for Lord Street.

== Oldham County Court ==
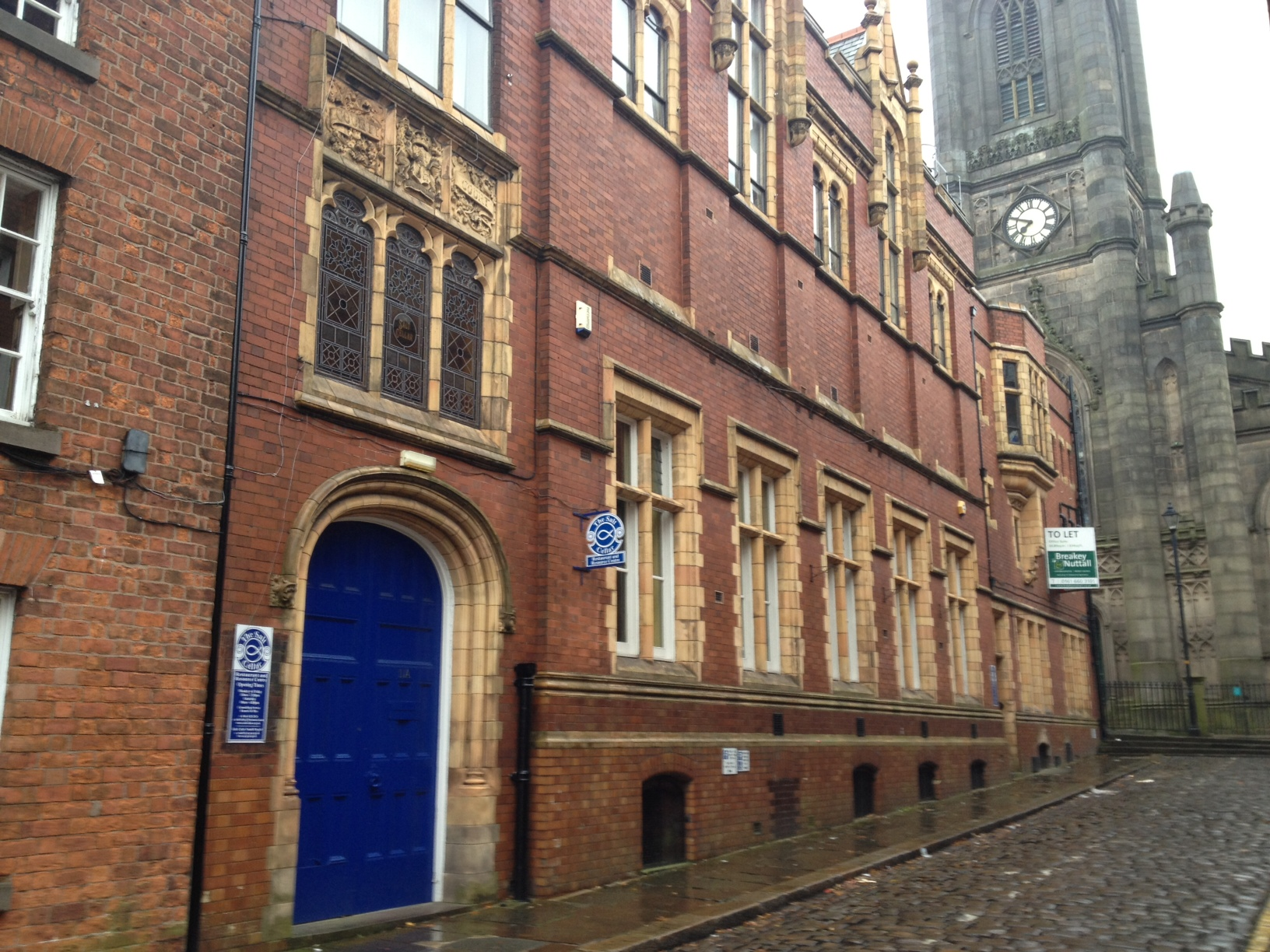
The old county court

Church Lane became the legal heart of the town when Oldham County Court opened in 1894. It was designed by Henry Tanner and is red brick with white terracotta dressings and has a Westmorland slate roof. It is referred to in Hansard when questions were asked in Parliament as to the dampness in the building and whether it caused the death of Judge Edwin Jones.

The old court house is now occupied by the Methodist Church which runs a cafe named The Salt Cellar, a Christian book shop and a youth outreach centre from there.

Oldham County Court moved to New Radcliffe Street, Oldham in 1998. Despite the loss of the county court, Church Lane remains one of Oldham's legal streets with four firms of solicitors still occupying premises.

== Present day ==
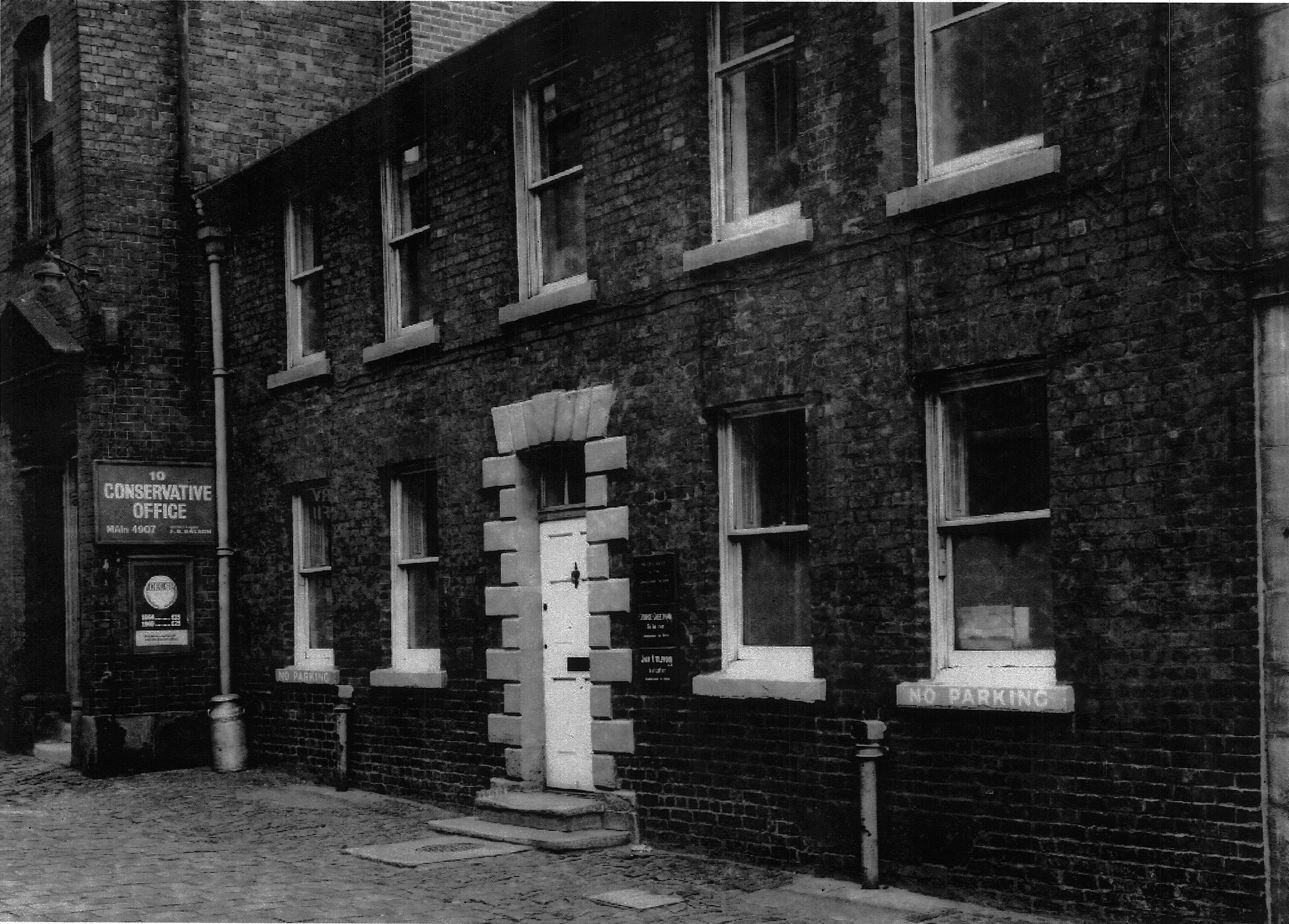
8 Church Lane, c1950

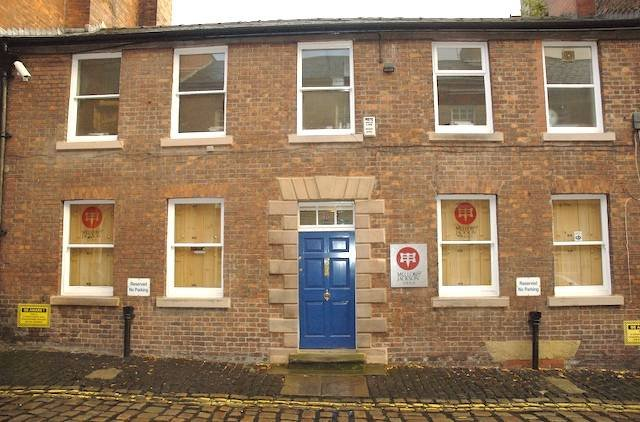
Mellor & Jackson, c2012

Numbers 1-5 and 2-6 have long since been demolished, making way for a new road and the chambers of the Oldham branch of Barclays Bank. The oldest remaining building on Church Lane is at number 8 which was built in about 1780 and pre-dates the parish church. This building is possibly the oldest building in the town centre. The rear of number 8 opens onto an alley known as Winter's Court named after the Rev William Winter, curate of St Peter's Chapel who lived in the Parson's Rooms in the early 1800s.

Number 8 Church Lane was occupied by solicitors since the late 1790s and was the home of Mellor & Jackson, since about 1920. The logo of the firm depicted the symbol of the turnpike road. The property has been empty since the firm closed in 2023.

Number 11 was built around 1800 and is now occupied by the Labour Party and is the offices of the Labour MP for Oldham East and Saddleworth Debbie Abrahams.

Numbers 10-14 were built around 1880 and are all three storeys with a Welsh slate roof. Number 10 had been the headquarters of the Conservative Party until 1990 when it was bought and converted to a cafe by the Methodist Church and named The Salt Cellar. Following the closure of the county court, the Salt Cellar moved across the lane with number ten becoming the offices of Age Concern which is now known as Age UK.

Number 12 has been occupied by Scott Hyman solicitors since the early 1990s.

Numbers 7-9 were a pair of houses but are now in use as offices. They were built around 1800 of brick with stone dressings and Welsh slate roofs.

== Current occupants ==
- 8: Vacant.
- 10: Age UK
- 12: Scott Hyman, Solicitors
- 14: Vacant
- 7: Howarth Housing Group
- 9: UK Credit Management
- 11: The Labour Party
- 11A: Vacant pending redevelopment
