= Parliamentary Secretary to the Local Government Board =

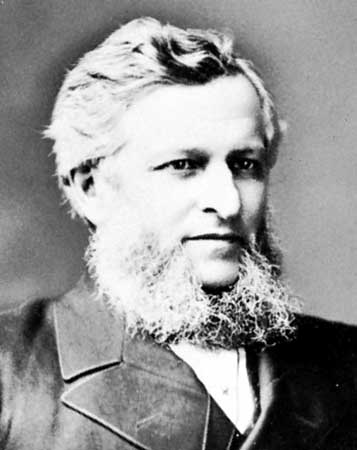
Jesse Collings, who served briefly as Parliamentary Secretary to the Local Government Board in 1886.

The Parliamentary Secretary to the Local Government Board was, from 1871 – 1919, a junior ministerial post in the United Kingdom subordinate to the President of the Local Government Board. The Local Government Board itself was established in 1871 and took in supervisory functions from the Board of Trade and the Home Office, including the Local Government Act Office that had been established by the Local Government Act 1858.

The position was abolished in June 1919, following the First World War, and the duties transferred to the new position of Parliamentary Secretary to the Ministry of Health.

== Parliamentary Secretaries to the Local Government Board, 1871-1919 ==
| Name | Entered office | Left office |
|---|---|---|
| J. T. Hibbert | 1871 | 1874 |
| Clare Sewell Read | 1874 | 1876 |
| Thomas Salt | 1876 | 1880 |
| J. T. Hibbert | 1880 | 1883 |
| George W. E. Russell | 1883 | 1885 |
| Adelbert Brownlow-Cust, 3rd Earl Brownlow | 1885 | 1886 |
| Jesse Collings | 1886 | 1886 |
| William Copeland Borlase | 1886 | 1886 |
| Walter Long | 1886 | 1892 |
| Sir Walter Foster | 1892 | 1895 |
| Thomas Wallace Russell | 1895 | 1900 |
| John Grant Lawson | 1900 | 1905 |
| Arthur Frederick Jeffreys | 1905 | 1905 |
| Walter Runciman | 1905 | 1907 |
| Thomas James Macnamara | 1907 | 1908 |
| Charles Masterman | 1908 | 1909 |
| Herbert Lewis | 1909 | 1915 |
| William Hayes Fisher | 1915 | 1917 |
| Stephen Walsh | 1917 | 1919 |
| Waldorf Astor | 1919 | June 1919 |
