= John Duncuft =

British politician

Member of Parliament for Oldham
- In office 31 July 1847 – 27 July 1852 Serving with John Morgan Cobbett (1852–1852); William Johnson Fox (1847–1852)
- Preceded by: John Fielden; William Augustus Johnson
- Succeeded by: John Morgan Cobbett; William Johnson Fox

Personal details
- Died: 27 July 1852
- Party: Peelite

John Duncuft (died 27 July 1852) was a British Peelite politician.

Duncuft was first elected Peelite MP for Oldham in 1847, and held the seat at the next general election in 1852. However, he died just a few months later.

Parliament of the United Kingdom
Preceded by John Fielden; William Augustus Johnson	Member of Parliament for Oldham; 1847–1852; With: John Morgan Cobbett (1852–1852); William Johnson Fox (1847–1852)	Succeeded by William Johnson Fox; John Morgan Cobbett
