= William Augustus Johnson =

English soldier and Member of Parliament

Lieutenant-General William Augustus Johnson (15 October 1777, Kenilworth – 26 October 1863, Witham on the Hill, Lincolnshire) was an English soldier and Member of Parliament.

He was the eldest son of The Rev. Robert Augustus Johnson, who was a descendant of Robert Johnson, Archdeacon of Leicester, and Anna Rebecca, the youngest sister of Lord Craven. He was educated at Rugby School.

He inherited the Georgian manor-house, Witham Hall, in Lincolnshire, from an uncle in 1814, whereupon he left active military duty on half-pay to manage its estate. His relation The Rev. Woolsey Johnson had built Witham Hall, which is mentioned by Nikolaus Pevsner in Buildings of England, as a private residence in 1752. His ancestor Archdeacon Johnson's family had resided in the adjacent village of Witham-on-the-Hill.

He married Lucy Foster (1815–1890) on 17 February 1835.

== Military service ==
He was commissioned as an ensign of foot in 1793, and promoted to captain in 1794. He served in the Peninsular War in 1808 and 1809, as a major in the 32nd Regiment, and was present at the battles of Roliça, Vimiero, and Corunna. He then served in the Walcheren expedition in 1809. In 1810 he became lieutenant-colonel of the 3rd Ceylon Regiment. He was promoted to colonel in 1819, and to major-general in 1830, and to lieutenant-general in 1841. He retired from the army in 1842.

== Political career ==
He served as Member of Parliament for Boston between 1821 and 1826, and for Oldham between 1837 and 1847.

He was a magistrate, deputy lieutenant of Lincolnshire and of Northamptonshire, and sheriff of Lincolnshire for 1830.

When slavery was abolished in 1833, he received compensation for the loss of slaves in Antigua.

He died, when aged 86, in 1863, after a fall at his home.

Parliament of the United Kingdom
Preceded by Henry Ellis; Gilbert Heathcote	Member of Parliament for Boston; 1821–1826; With: Gilbert Heathcote	Succeeded by Neil Malcolm; Gilbert Heathcote
Preceded by John Fielden; John Frederick Lees	Member of Parliament for Oldham; 1837 – 1847; With: John Fielden	Succeeded by William Johnson Fox; John Duncuft
