= John Platt (MP) =

English businessman & politician (1817-1872)

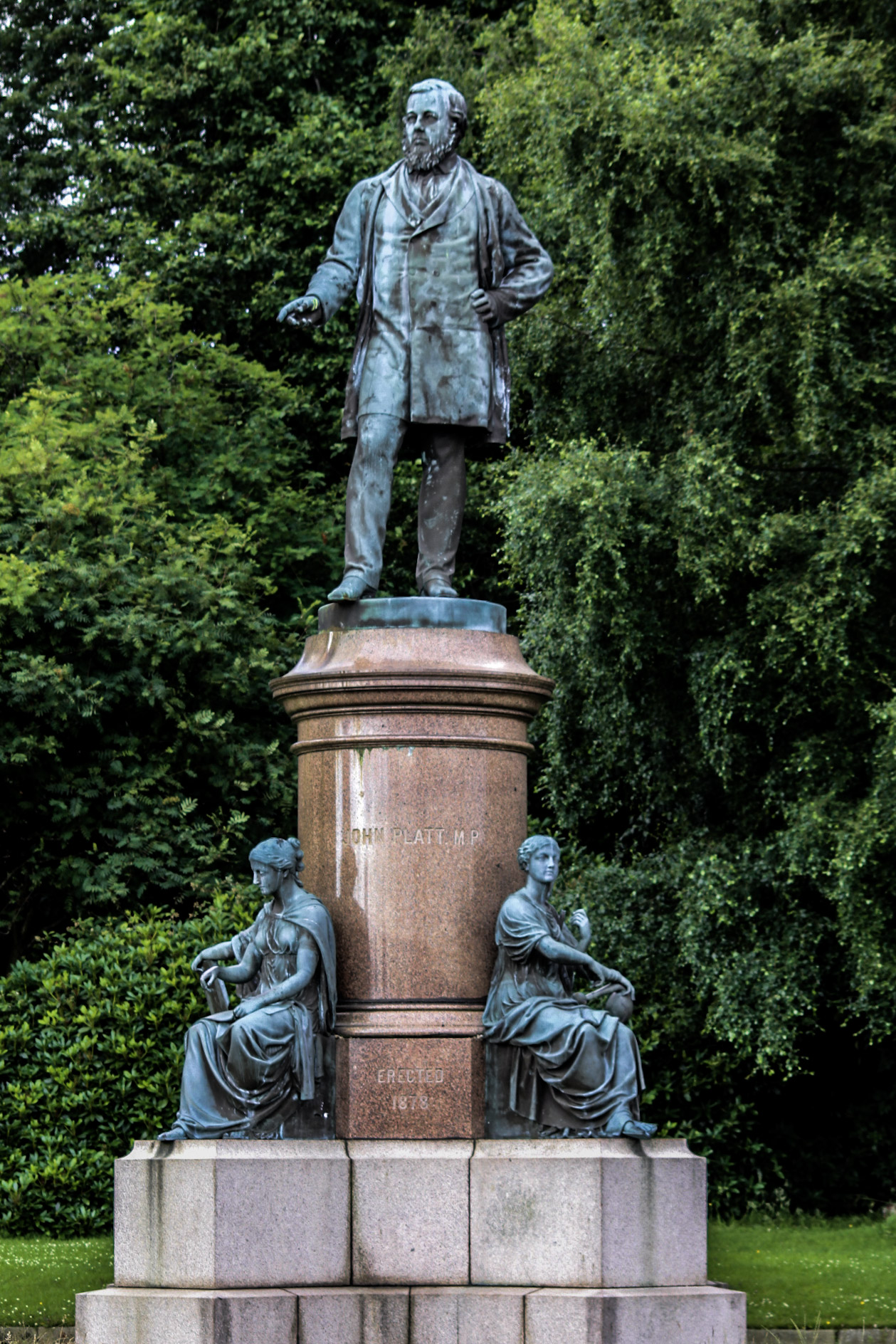
A memorial of John Platt

John Platt (16 September 1817 – 18 May 1872) was an English manufacturer of textile machinery and Liberal politician.

Platt was born at Dobcross, West Riding of Yorkshire, the son of Henry Platt who founded Platt Brothers textile machinery manufacturers in 1770. which by 1820 was based at Werneth area of Oldham.

Platt was elected as the first Liberal Mayor of Oldham in 1854 and held office again in 1855–56. By the mid-1850s his company had established itself as the world's largest textile machinery manufacturer. Platt acquired property in Llanfairfechan North Wales in 1857 and rebuild Bryn Y Neuadd as a magnificent mansion. He was mayor of Oldham again in 1861–62. In 1865 he was elected Member of Parliament for Oldham. He held the seat until his death in Paris on 18 May 1872, at the age of 55.

Platt married Alice Radcliffe in 1842. She died at Oakleigh, Leamington, on 19 December 1902, aged 79.

- Their second son Samuel Radcliffe Platt (1844–1902) became head of the firm Platt Brothers, and was High Sheriff of Lancashire in 1897.
- Their daughter Mary married Thomas Hardcastle Sykes of the Sykes Bleaching Company.

Platt's younger brother James Platt (1824–1857) was also elected MP for Oldham in 1857, but was killed that same year in Greenfield at Ashway Gap on Saddleworth Moor by an accidental discharge of the gun of Josiah Radcliffe, the Mayor of Oldham.

A statue was erected of John Platt in Oldham by David Watson Stevenson in 1878.

Parliament of the United Kingdom
Preceded by John Morgan Cobbett; John Tomlinson Hibbert	Member of Parliament for Oldham; 1865 – 1872; With: John Tomlinson Hibbert	Succeeded by John Morgan Cobbett; John Tomlinson Hibbert
