= 1872 Oldham by-election =

UK Parliamentary by-election

A by-election was held in Oldham on 5 June 1872. The by-election was fought due to the death of the incumbent MP of the Liberal Party, John Platt. It was won by the Conservative candidate John Morgan Cobbett.
