= Oldham (constituency) =

Parliamentary constituency in the United Kingdom, 1832–1950

- Former borough constituency for the House of Commons

1832–1950
- Seats: two
- Created from: Lancashire
- Replaced by: Oldham East and Oldham West

Oldham was a parliamentary constituency centred on the town of Oldham, England. It returned two Members of Parliament (MPs) to the House of Commons of the Parliament of the United Kingdom. The constituency was created by the Reform Act 1832 and was abolished for the 1950 general election when it was split into the Oldham East and Oldham West constituencies.

The Oldham constituency was where Winston Churchill began his political career. Although taking two attempts to succeed, in the 1900 general election Churchill was elected as the member of Parliament for Oldham. He held the constituency for the Conservative Party until he defected from them in defence of free trade in 1904. He then represented the Liberal Party as MP for the seat until the 1906 general election.

== Boundaries ==
Though centred on Oldham (the town), the constituency covered a much broader territory; Shaw and Crompton, Royton, Chadderton and Lees all formed part of this district, though these were each granted individual urban district status at a local government level in 1894.

1885–1918: The existing parliamentary borough, and so much of the municipal borough of Oldham as was not already included in the parliamentary borough.

== Members of Parliament ==
Election	1st Member	1st Party	2nd Member	2nd Party
1832	John Fielden	Radical	William Cobbett	Radical
1835 by-election	John Fielden	Radical	John Frederick Lees	Conservative
1837	John Fielden	Radical	William Augustus Johnson	Radical
1847	William Johnson Fox	Radical	John Duncuft	Peelite
1852	John Morgan Cobbett^{a}	Radical	John Duncuft	Peelite
1852 by-election	John Morgan Cobbett^{a}	Radical	William Johnson Fox	Radical
1857	John Morgan Cobbett^{a}	Radical	James Platt	Radical
1857 by-election	John Morgan Cobbett^{a}	Radical	William Johnson Fox	Radical
1859	John Morgan Cobbett^{a}	Liberal	William Johnson Fox	Liberal
1862 by-election	John Morgan Cobbett^{a}	Liberal	J. T. Hibbert	Liberal
1865	John Platt	Liberal	J. T. Hibbert	Liberal
1872 by-election	John Morgan Cobbett ^{a}	Conservative	J. T. Hibbert	Liberal
1874	John Morgan Cobbett ^{a}	Conservative	Frederick Spinks	Conservative
1877 by-election	J. T. Hibbert	Liberal	Frederick Spinks	Conservative
1880	J. T. Hibbert	Liberal	Hon. Edward Stanley	Liberal
1885	J. T. Hibbert	Liberal	James Mackenzie Maclean	Conservative
1886	Elliott Lees	Conservative	James Mackenzie Maclean	Conservative
1892	Joshua Milne Cheetham	Liberal	J. T. Hibbert	Liberal
1895	Robert Ascroft	Conservative	James Francis Oswald	Conservative
1899 by-election	Rt Hon. Alfred Emmott	Liberal	Walter Runciman	Liberal
1900	Rt Hon. Alfred Emmott	Liberal	Winston Churchill ^{b}	Conservative
1904	Rt Hon. Alfred Emmott	Liberal	Winston Churchill ^{b}	Liberal
1906	Rt Hon. Alfred Emmott	Liberal	John Albert Bright	Liberal
1910 (Jan)	Rt Hon. Alfred Emmott	Liberal	Sir William Barton	Liberal
1911 by-election	Edmund Bartley-Denniss ^{c}	Conservative	Sir William Barton	Liberal
1916	Edmund Bartley-Denniss ^{c}	Conservative	Sir William Barton	Coalition Liberal
1921	Edmund Bartley-Denniss ^{c}	Conservative	Sir William Barton	Liberal
1922	William John Tout	Labour	Sir Edward Grigg	National Liberal
1923	William John Tout	Labour	Sir Edward Grigg	Liberal
1924	Duff Cooper	Conservative	Sir Edward Grigg	Liberal
1925 by-election	Duff Cooper	Conservative	William Wiggins	Liberal
1929	Rev. Gordon Lang	Labour	James Wilson	Labour
1931	Anthony Crossley	Conservative	Hamilton Kerr	Conservative
1935	John Dodd	National Liberal	Hamilton Kerr	Conservative
1945	Frank Fairhurst	Labour	Leslie Hale	Labour
1950	Multi member constituency abolished - see Oldham East and Oldham West			

Notes:-

- ^{a} J M Cobbett's political affiliations are complicated. He had stood unsuccessfully on an all-Radical 'plague on both your houses' slate with John Fielden in 1847. He was elected in 1852 as the Radical half of an explicit Radical-Tory alliance. At the 1857 election he was opposed by two Liberals and denied that he had sold out to Palmerston, asserting that the Liberal Chief Whip had no confidence in him. In 1865 he stood unsuccessfully in conjunction with a Conservative, opposed by two Liberals. Nonetheless, from 1852 to 1865 outside Oldham he was generally taken to be a Liberal. From 1872 to his death in 1877 he sat as a Conservative (but one calling for annual Parliaments and manhood suffrage)
- ^{b} Churchill changed his party allegiance in April 1904.
- ^{c} Denniss changed his surname to Bartley-Denniss, when he was knighted in 1922.

== Elections ==
=== Elections in the 1830s ===
General election 1832: Oldham (2 seats)
Party	Candidate	Votes	%
Radical	✓ John Fielden	677	43.0
Radical	✓ William Cobbett	645	40.9
Whig	Benjamin Heywood Bright	150	9.5
Tory	William Burge	101	6.4
Whig	George Stephen	3	0.2
Majority		495	31.4
Turnout		848	75.0
Registered electors		1,131	
Radical win (new seat)			
Radical win (new seat)			

General election 1835: Oldham
Party	Candidate	Votes	%
Radical	✓ John Fielden	Unopposed	
Radical	✓ William Cobbett	Unopposed	
Registered electors		1,029	
Radical hold			
Radical hold			

Cobbett's death caused a by-election.

By-election, 8 July 1835: Oldham (1 seat)
Party	Candidate	Votes	%
Conservative	✓ John Frederick Lees	394	48.7
Radical	John Morgan Cobbett	381	47.1
Radical	Feargus O'Connor	34	4.2
Majority		13	1.6
Turnout		809	78.6
Registered electors		1,029	
Conservative gain from Radical			

General election 1837: Oldham
Party	Candidate	Votes	%
Radical	✓ William Augustus Johnson	545	32.4
Radical	✓ John Fielden	541	32.2
Conservative	Joseph Jones	315	18.8
Conservative	John Frederick Lees	279	16.6
Majority		226	13.4
Turnout		859	62.6
Registered electors		1,372	
Radical gain from Conservative			
Radical hold			

=== Elections in the 1840s ===
General election 1841: Oldham
Party	Candidate	Votes	%	±%
Radical	✓ John Fielden	Unopposed		
Radical	✓ William Augustus Johnson	Unopposed		
Registered electors		1,467		
Radical hold				
Radical hold				

General election 1847: Oldham
Party	Candidate	Votes	%	±%
Radical	✓ William Johnson Fox	726	27.3	N/A
Peelite	✓ John Duncuft	696	26.2	New
Radical	John Morgan Cobbett	624	23.5	N/A
Radical	John Fielden	612	23.0	N/A
Turnout		1,329 (est)	78.6 (est)	N/A
Registered electors		1,691		
Majority		30	1.1	N/A
Radical hold		Swing	N/A	
Majority		84	3.2	N/A
Peelite gain from Radical		Swing	N/A	

=== Elections in the 1850s ===
General election 1852: Oldham
Party	Candidate	Votes	%	±%
Radical	✓ John Morgan Cobbett	957	36.8	+13.3
Peelite	✓ John Duncuft	868	33.4	+7.2
Radical	William Johnson Fox	777	29.9	+2.6
Turnout		1,301 (est)	68.8 (est)	−9.8
Registered electors		1,890		
Majority		89	3.4	+2.3
Radical hold		Swing	+4.9	
Majority		91	3.5	+0.3
Peelite hold		Swing	−11.6	

Duncuft's death caused a by-election.

By-election, 3 December 1852: Oldham
Party	Candidate	Votes	%	±%
Radical	✓ William Johnson Fox	895	53.3	−13.4
Conservative	James Heald	783	46.7	+13.3
Majority		112	6.6	N/A
Turnout		1,678	84.8	+16.0
Registered electors		1,978		
Radical gain from Peelite		Swing	−13.3	

General election 1857: Oldham
Party	Candidate	Votes	%	±%
Radical	✓ John Morgan Cobbett	949	34.1	−2.7
Radical	✓ James Platt	934	33.6	N/A
Radical	William Johnson Fox	898	32.3	+2.4
Majority		36	1.3	−2.1
Turnout		1,391 (est)	66.3 (est)	−2.5
Registered electors		2,098		
Radical hold		Swing	N/A	
Radical gain from Peelite		Swing	N/A	

Platt's death caused a by-election.

By-election, 19 October 1857: Oldham
Party	Candidate	Votes	%	±%
Radical	William Johnson Fox	Unopposed		
Radical hold				

General election 1859: Oldham
Party	Candidate	Votes	%	±%
Liberal	✓ William Johnson Fox	1,039	35.1	+2.8
Liberal	✓ John Morgan Cobbett	966	32.6	−1.5
Liberal	J. T. Hibbert	955	32.3	N/A
Majority		11	0.3	−1.0
Turnout		1,480 (est)	68.8 (est)	+2.5
Registered electors		2,151		
Liberal hold		Swing	N/A	
Liberal hold		Swing	N/A	

=== Elections in the 1860s ===
Fox's resignation caused a by-election.

By-election, 5 May 1862: Oldham
Party	Candidate	Votes	%	±%
Liberal	✓ J. T. Hibbert	Unopposed		
Liberal hold				

General election 1865: Oldham
Party	Candidate	Votes	%	±%
Liberal	✓ J. T. Hibbert	1,104	28.1	−4.2
Liberal	✓ John Platt	1,075	27.4	N/A
Liberal	John Morgan Cobbett	899	22.9	−9.7
Conservative	Frederick Spinks	846	21.6	New
Majority		176	4.5	+4.2
Turnout		1,962 (est)	85.9 (est)	+17.1
Registered electors		2,285		
Liberal hold		Swing		
Liberal hold		Swing		

General election 1868: Oldham
Party	Candidate	Votes	%	±%
Liberal	✓ J. T. Hibbert	6,140	25.1	−3.0
Liberal	✓ John Platt	6,122	25.0	−2.4
Conservative	John Morgan Cobbett	6,116	25.0	+2.1
Conservative	Frederick Spinks	6,084	24.9	+3.3
Majority		6	0.0	−4.5
Turnout		12,231 (est)	90.9 (est)	+5.0
Registered electors		13,454		
Liberal hold		Swing	−2.9	
Liberal hold		Swing	−2.6	

=== Elections in the 1870s ===
Platt's death caused a by-election.

1872 Oldham by-election
Party	Candidate	Votes	%	±%
Conservative	✓ John Morgan Cobbett	7,278	51.0	+1.1
Liberal	Edward Stanley	6,984	49.0	−1.1
Majority		294	2.0	N/A
Turnout		14,262	88.8	−2.1
Registered electors		16,063		
Conservative gain from Liberal		Swing	+1.1	

General election 1874: Oldham
Party	Candidate	Votes	%	±%
Conservative	✓ Frederick Spinks	8,582	25.3	+0.4
Conservative	✓ John Morgan Cobbett	8,541	25.2	+0.2
Liberal	J. T. Hibbert	8,397	24.8	−0.3
Liberal	Edward Stanley	8,360	24.7	−0.3
Majority		222	1.6	N/A
Majority		144	0.4	N/A
Turnout		16,940 (est)	91.3 (est)	+0.4
Registered electors		18,560		
Conservative gain from Liberal		Swing	+0.4	
Conservative gain from Liberal		Swing	+0.3	

Cobbett's death caused a by-election.

1877 Oldham by-election
Party	Candidate	Votes	%	±%
Liberal	✓ J. T. Hibbert	9,542	51.9	+2.4
Conservative	Thomas Evans Lees	8,831	48.1	−2.4
Majority		711	3.8	N/A
Turnout		18,373	90.7	−0.6
Registered electors		20,249		
Liberal gain from Conservative		Swing	+2.4	

=== Elections in the 1880s ===
General election 1880: Oldham
Party	Candidate	Votes	%	±%
Liberal	✓ J. T. Hibbert	10,630	27.5	+2.7
Liberal	✓ Edward Stanley	10,409	27.0	+2.3
Conservative	Frederick Spinks	8,982	23.3	−2.0
Conservative	Smith Taylor-Whitehead	8,593	22.3	−2.9
Majority		2,037	5.2	N/A
Majority		1,427	3.7	N/A
Turnout		19,307 (est)	91.6 (est)	+0.3
Registered electors		21,084		
Liberal gain from Conservative		Swing	+2.4	
Liberal gain from Conservative		Swing	+2.6	

General election 1885: Oldham
Party	Candidate	Votes	%	±%
Liberal	✓ J. T. Hibbert	12,259	25.7	−1.8
Conservative	✓ James Mackenzie Maclean	11,992	25.2	+1.9
Liberal	Edward Stanley	11,847	24.9	−2.1
Conservative	Smith Taylor-Whitehead	11,491	24.9	+1.9
Turnout		24,016	93.8	+2.2 (est)
Registered electors		25,600		
Majority		768	1.5	−2.2
Liberal hold		Swing	−1.9	
Majority		145	0.3	N/A
Conservative gain from Liberal		Swing	+2.0	

Elliot Lees

General election 1886: Oldham
Party	Candidate	Votes	%	±%
Conservative	✓ James Mackenzie Maclean	11,606	25.8	+0.6
Conservative	✓ Elliot Lees	11,484	25.6	+1.4
Liberal	J. T. Hibbert	10,921	24.3	−1.4
Liberal	Joshua Cheetham	10,891	24.3	−0.6
Majority		563	1.3	N/A
Turnout		22,608	88.3	−5.5
Registered electors		25,600		
Conservative hold		Swing	+0.6	
Conservative gain from Liberal		Swing	+1.4	

=== Elections in the 1890s ===
General election 1892: Oldham
Party	Candidate	Votes	%	±%
Liberal	✓ Joshua Cheetham	12,619	25.6	+1.3
Liberal	✓ J. T. Hibbert	12,541	25.4	+1.1
Conservative	Elliot Lees	12,205	24.7	−0.8
Conservative	James Mackenzie Maclean	11,952	24.2	−1.6
Majority		677	1.4	N/A
Majority		336	0.7	N/A
Turnout		24,857 (est)	89.0	+0.7
Registered electors		27,929		
Liberal gain from Conservative		Swing	+1.1	
Liberal gain from Conservative		Swing	+1.4	

Robert Ascroft

James Oswald

General election 1895: Oldham
Party	Candidate	Votes	%	±%
Conservative	✓ Robert Ascroft	13,085	26.2	+1.5
Conservative	✓ James Oswald	12,465	25.0	+0.8
Liberal	Adam Lee	12,249	24.6	−1.0
Liberal	J. T. Hibbert	12,092	24.2	−1.2
Majority		993	2.0	N/A
Majority		216	0.4	N/A
Turnout		25,185 (est)	87.5	−1.5
Registered electors		28,783		
Conservative gain from Liberal		Swing	+1.2	
Conservative gain from Liberal		Swing	+1.0	

Ascroft’s death and Oswald's resignation caused a by-election.

Walter Runciman

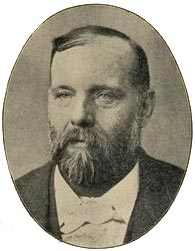
James Mawdsley

1899 Oldham by-election
Party	Candidate	Votes	%	±%
Liberal	✓ Alfred Emmott	12,976	26.7	+2.1
Liberal	✓ Walter Runciman	12,770	26.2	+2.0
Conservative	Winston Churchill	11,477	23.6	−2.6
Conservative	James Mawdsley	11,449	23.5	−1.5
Majority		1,527	3.2	N/A
Majority		1,293	2.6	N/A
Turnout		24,546 (est)	86.2	−1.3
Registered electors		28,476		
Liberal gain from Conservative		Swing	+2.4	
Liberal gain from Conservative		Swing	+1.8	

=== Elections in the 1900s ===
Alfred Emmott

General election 1900: Oldham
Party	Candidate	Votes	%	±%
Liberal	✓ Alfred Emmott	12,947	25.3	+0.7
Conservative	✓ Winston Churchill	12,931	25.3	−0.9
Liberal	Walter Runciman	12,709	24.9	+0.7
Conservative	Charles Birch Crisp	12,522	24.5	−0.5
Turnout		51,109	87.9	+0.4
Registered electors		29,253		
Majority		425	0.8	N/A
Liberal gain from Conservative		Swing	+0.6	
Majority		222	0.4	0.0
Conservative hold		Swing	−0.8	

General election 1906: Oldham
Party	Candidate	Votes	%	±%
Liberal	✓ Alfred Emmott	17,397	30.3	+5.0
Liberal	✓ John Bright	16,672	29.0	+4.1
Conservative	Charles Birch Crisp	11,989	20.9	−3.6
Conservative	E. L. Hartley	11,391	19.8	−5.5
Turnout		57,449	89.3	+1.4
Registered electors		32,387		
Majority		4,683	8.1	N/A
Liberal hold		Swing	+4.3	
Liberal gain from Conservative		Swing	+3.9	

=== Elections in the 1910s ===
General election January 1910: Oldham
Party	Candidate	Votes	%	±%
Liberal	✓ Alfred Emmott	19,252	30.0	−0.3
Liberal	✓ William Barton	18,840	29.4	+0.4
Conservative	Joseph Hilton	13,462	21.0	+0.1
Conservative	Sidney Stott	12,577	19.6	−0.2
Majority		5,378	8.4	+0.3
Turnout		64,131	91.8	+2.5
Registered electors		35,315		
Liberal hold		Swing	−0.2	
Liberal hold		Swing	+0.2	

General election December 1910: Oldham
Party	Candidate	Votes	%	±%
Liberal	✓ Alfred Emmott	17,108	28.1	−1.9
Liberal	✓ William Barton	16,941	27.9	−1.5
Conservative	Arthur Edward Wrigley	13,440	22.1	+1.1
Conservative	Edmund Bartley-Denniss	13,281	21.9	+2.3
Majority		3,501	5.8	−2.6
Turnout		60,770	86.8	−5.0
Registered electors		35,315		
Liberal hold		Swing	−1.5	
Liberal hold		Swing	−1.3	

1911 Oldham by-election
Party	Candidate	Votes	%	±%
Conservative	✓ Edmund Bartley-Denniss	12,255	40.4	−3.6
Liberal	Arthur Stanley	10,623	35.0	−21.0
Labour	William C. Robinson	7,448	24.6	New
Majority		1,632	5.4	N/A
Turnout		30,326	85.1	−1.7
Registered electors		35,626		
Conservative gain from Liberal		Swing	+8.7	

General Election 1914–15:

Another General Election was required to take place before the end of 1915. The political parties had been making preparations for an election to take place and by the July 1914, the following candidates had been selected;

- Liberal: W. H. Sumnervell
- Unionist: John Radcliffe Platt, Edmund Bartley-Denniss
- Labour: William C. Robinson

William Barton

General election 1918: Oldham
Party		Candidate	Votes	%	±%
C	Unionist	✓ Edmund Bartley-Denniss	26,568	34.3	+12.4
C	National Liberal	✓ William Barton	26,254	34.0	+6.1
	Labour	William C. Robinson	15,178	19.6	N/A
	Liberal	Walter Rea	9,323	12.1	−16.0
Turnout			77,323	54.2	−32.6
Registered electors			71,378		
Majority			17,245	22.2	N/A
	Unionist gain from Liberal		Swing	+14.2	
Majority			11,076	14.4	+8.6
	National Liberal hold		Swing		
C indicates candidate endorsed by the coalition government.

=== Elections in the 1920s ===
Edward Grigg

General election 1922: Oldham
Party	Candidate	Votes	%	±%
National Liberal	✓ Edward Grigg	24,762	28.0	N/A
Labour	✓ William Tout	24,434	27.7	+8.1
Unionist	Samuel Smethurst	23,200	26.2	−8.1
Liberal	William Tudor Davies	9,812	11.1	−22.9
Liberal	Mary Emmott	6,186	7.0	−5.1
Turnout		88,394	62.6	+8.4
National Liberal hold		Swing	N/A	
Majority		14,950	16.7	N/A
Labour gain from Unionist		Swing	+8.1	
Majority		1,234	1.5	N/A

General election 1923: Oldham (2 seats)
Party	Candidate	Votes	%	±%
Labour	✓ William Tout	20,939	23.4	−4.3
Liberal	✓ Edward Grigg	20,681	23.2	−4.8
Liberal	William Wiggins	17,990	20.1	+9.0
Unionist	W.E. Freeman	15,819	17.7	N/A
Unionist	Samuel Smethurst	13,894	15.6	−10.6
Majority		2,949	3.3	+1.8
Majority		4,862	5.5	−11.2
Turnout		89,323	76.3	+13.7
Labour hold		Swing		
Liberal hold		Swing		

General election 1924: Oldham
Party	Candidate	Votes	%	±%
Unionist	✓ Duff Cooper	37,419	31.2	
Liberal	✓ Edward Grigg	36,761	30.7	
Labour	William Tout	23,623	19.7	
Labour	James Wilson	22,081	18.4	
Majority		13,796	11.5	N/A
Turnout		119,884		
Liberal hold		Swing		
Unionist gain from Labour		Swing		

1925 Oldham by-election
Party	Candidate	Votes	%	±%
Liberal	✓ William Wiggins	26,325	54.8	+24.1
Labour	William Tout	21,702	45.2	+7.1
Majority		4,623	9.6	
Turnout		48,027		
Liberal hold		Swing		

General election 1929: Oldham
Party	Candidate	Votes	%	±%
Labour	✓ Gordon Lang	34,223	26.2	+6.5
Labour	✓ James Wilson	32,727	25.0	+6.6
Unionist	Duff Cooper	29,424	22.5	−8.7
Liberal	John Dodd	20,810	15.9	−14.8
Liberal	George James Jenkins	13,528	10.4	N/A
Majority		13,413	10.3	N/A
Majority		3,303	2.5	N/A
Turnout		130,712	81.2	
Labour gain from Liberal		Swing		
Labour gain from Unionist		Swing		

=== Elections in the 1930s ===
General election 1931: Oldham
Party	Candidate	Votes	%	±%
Conservative	✓ Anthony Crossley	50,693	32.5	
Conservative	✓ Hamilton Kerr	50,395	32.3	
Labour	Gordon Lang	28,629	18.3	
Labour	James Wilson	26,361	16.9	
Majority		21,766	14.2	N/A
Majority		24,034	15.4	N/A
Turnout		156,348		
Conservative gain from Labour		Swing		
Conservative gain from Labour		Swing		

General election 1935: Oldham
Party	Candidate	Votes	%	±%
Conservative	✓ Hamilton Kerr	36,738	25.51	
National Liberal	✓ John Dodd	34,755	24.13	
Labour	Gordon Lang	34,316	23.83	
Labour	Matthew Burrow Farr	29,647	20.58	
Liberal	William Gretton Ward	8,534	5.92	
Majority		1,983	1.68	−12.5
Turnout		143,990		
Conservative hold		Swing		
National Liberal gain from Conservative		Swing		

General Election 1939–40

Another General Election was required to take place before the end of 1940. The political parties had been making preparations for an election to take place and by the Autumn of 1939, the following candidates had been selected;

- Conservative: Hamilton Kerr
- Liberal National: John Dodd
- Labour: Leslie Hale, D A Mainds
- Liberal: James Taylor Middleton

=== Elections in the 1940s ===
General election 1945: Oldham
Party	Candidate	Votes	%	±%
Labour	✓ Frank Fairhurst	31,704	23.9	
Labour	✓ Leslie Hale	31,327	23.6	
Conservative	Hamilton Kerr	26,911	20.3	
National Liberal	John Dodd	24,199	18.2	
Liberal	James Taylor Middleton	10,365	7.8	
Liberal	Thomas Donald Farrell Powell	8,264	6.2	
Majority		7,505	5.7	N/A
Majority		4,416	3.3	N/A
Turnout		132,770	74.6	
Labour gain from National Liberal		Swing		
Labour gain from Conservative		Swing		

== Sources ==
- Boundaries of Parliamentary Constituencies 1885–1972, compiled and edited by F. W. S. Craig (Parliamentary Reference Publications 1972)
- British Parliamentary Election Results 1832–1885, compiled and edited by F.W.S. Craig (The Macmillan Press 1977)
- British Parliamentary Election Results 1885–1918, compiled and edited by F.W.S. Craig (Macmillan Press 1974)
- British Parliamentary Election Results 1918–1949, compiled and edited by F.W.S. Craig (Macmillan Press, revised edition 1977)
- Who's Who of British Members of Parliament: Volume I 1832–1885, edited by M. Stenton (The Harvester Press 1976)
- Who's Who of British Members of Parliament, Volume II 1886–1918, edited by M. Stenton and S. Lees (Harvester Press 1978)
- Who's Who of British Members of Parliament, Volume III 1919–1945, edited by M. Stenton and S. Lees (Harvester Press 1979)
- Who's Who of British Members of Parliament, Volume IV 1945–1979, edited by M. Stenton and S. Lees (Harvester Press 1981)
