= J. T. Hibbert =

British barrister and Liberal Politician (1824–1908)

The Right Honourable Sir J. T. Hibbert KCB JP DL
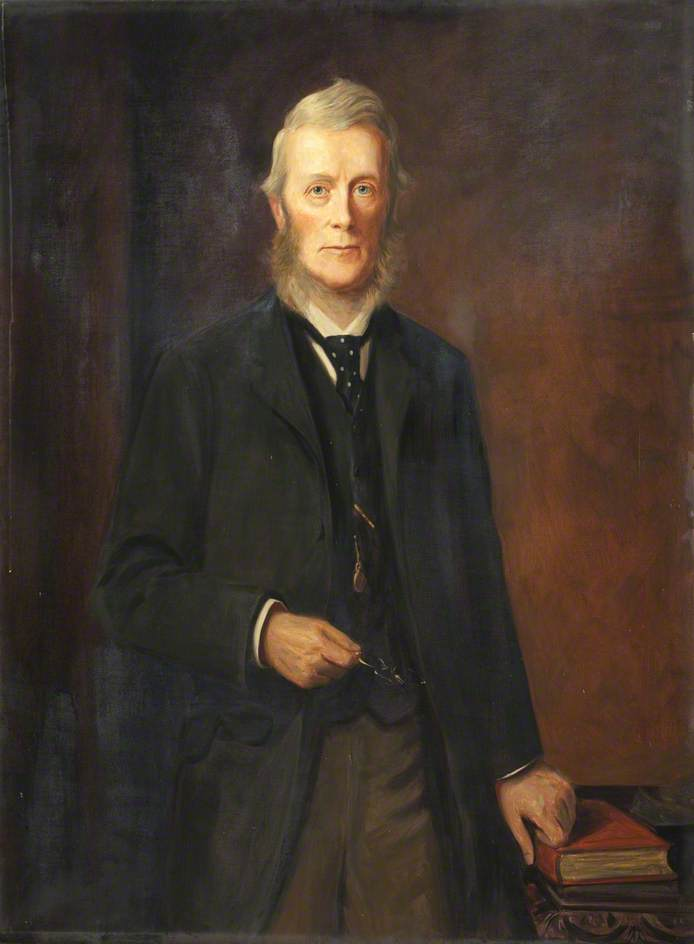

Financial Secretary to the Treasury
- In office 12 December 1884 – 9 June 1885
- Monarch: Victoria
- Prime Minister: William Ewart Gladstone
- Preceded by: Leonard Courtney
- Succeeded by: Sir Henry Holland, Bt
- In office 18 August 1892 – 21 June 1895
- Monarch: Victoria
- Prime Minister: William Ewart Gladstone; The Earl of Rosebery
- Preceded by: John Eldon Gorst
- Succeeded by: Robert William Hanbury

Personal details
- Born: 5 January 1824
- Died: 7 November 1908 (aged 84)
- Party: Liberal
- Education: St John's College, Cambridge

Sir John Tomlinson Hibbert KCB PC JP DL (5 January 1824 – 7 November 1908) was a British barrister and Liberal politician.

== Background and education ==
The eldest son of Elijah Hibbert and Betty Hilton, he was educated at Shrewsbury and St John's College, Cambridge. He was called to the Bar, Inner Temple, in 1849.

== Political career ==
Hibbert was Member of Parliament for Oldham from 1862 to 1874, 1877 to 1886 and 1892 to 1895, when he lost his seat. He served under William Ewart Gladstone as Parliamentary Secretary to the Local Government Board from 1872 to 1874 and again from 1880 to 1883, as Under-Secretary of State for the Home Department from 1883 to 1884, as Financial Secretary to the Treasury from 1884 to 1885 and as Parliamentary and Financial Secretary to the Admiralty from February to July 1886 and under Gladstone and later Lord Rosebery as once again Financial Secretary to the Treasury from 1892 to 1895. In 1886, he was sworn of the Privy Council.

Hibbert served as President of the second day of the second Co-operative Congress in 1870.

In 1889, Hibbert was elected as the first Chairman of the newly created Lancashire County Council. He was later President of the County Councils Association. In 1893 he was appointed a Knight Commander of the Order of the Bath.

He received the honorary degree Doctor of Laws (LL.D.) from the Victoria University of Manchester in February 1902, in connection with the 50th jubilee celebrations of the establishment of the university.

== Personal life ==
Hibbert died in November 1908, aged 84. He is buried at St Paul's, Lindale, Cumbria.

Parliament of the United Kingdom
Preceded by John Morgan Cobbett; William Johnson Fox	Member of Parliament for Oldham; 1862–1874; With: John Morgan Cobbett 1862–1865; John Platt 1865–1872; John Morgan Cobbett 1872–1874	Succeeded by John Morgan Cobbett; Frederick Lowten Spinks
Preceded by John Morgan Cobbett; Frederick Lowten Spinks	Member of Parliament for Oldham; 1877–1886; With: Frederick Lowten Spinks 1877–1880; Edward Stanley 1880–1885; James Mackenzie Maclean 1885–1886	Succeeded by James Mackenzie Maclean; Elliott Lees
Preceded by James Mackenzie Maclean; Elliott Lees	Member of Parliament for Oldham; 1892–1895; With: Joshua Milne Cheetham	Succeeded by Robert Ascroft; James Francis Oswald
Political offices
New office	Parliamentary Secretary to the Local Government Board; 1872–1874	Succeeded by Clare Sewell Read
Preceded by Thomas Salt	Parliamentary Secretary to the Local Government Board; 1880–1883	Succeeded by George W. E. Russell
Preceded by The Earl of Rosebery	Under-Secretary of State for the Home Department; 1883–1884	Succeeded by Henry Fowler
Preceded by Leonard Courtney	Financial Secretary to the Treasury; 1884–1885	Succeeded by Sir Henry Holland, Bt
Preceded by Charles Ritchie	Parliamentary and Financial Secretary to the Admiralty; February–July 1886	Succeeded by Arthur Forwood
Preceded by John Eldon Gorst	Financial Secretary to the Treasury; 1892–1895	Succeeded by Robert William Hanbury
