= John Frederick Lees =

British landowner and Liberal Conservative MP (1809–67)

Member of Parliament for Oldham
- In office 1835–1837
- Preceded by: William Cobbett
- Succeeded by: William Augustus Johnson

Personal details
- Born: 1809 Oldham, Lancashire, England
- Died: 1867 (aged 57–58) Cheltenham, Gloucestershire, England
- Party: Liberal Conservative
- Relatives: Dame Sarah Lees
- Occupation: Politician

John Frederick Lees (1809 – 1867) was a British landowner and Liberal Conservative politician who represented Oldham in the House of Commons of the United Kingdom as a Member of Parliament from 1835 to 1837.

== Biography ==
Lees was the grandson of a cotton manufacturer, a local mill-owner, mine-owner, and landowner: the Lord of the manor of Oldham and an Oxford graduate, but was dismissed as "a gentleman... qualified neither by age nor ability to fulfill the duties of a member of the imperial parliament" by the Manchester Times. Hansard reports him to have made no speeches in Parliament during his term.

== Politics ==
Thanks to internal squabbles (principally over the desired relationship between the state and the Anglican church) amongst the Radicals of Oldham, he was elected as a 'Liberal Conservative' at a by-election caused by the death of William Cobbett, narrowly defeating John Morgan Cobbett (Cobbett's son) after another Radical candidate (Feargus O'Connor) withdrew on the first morning of the poll. Lees attributed his victory to the absence of the organised 'intimidation system' he claimed had been practiced in the previous contested election (that of 1832). By the general election of 1837 the Radicals had regrouped, and Lees came bottom of the poll: this he attributed to the return of intimidation and 'exclusive dealing'.
