= John Morgan Cobbett =

Conservative Party and Liberal Party politician (1800–1877)

John Morgan Cobbett MP
- John Morgan Cobbett

Member of Parliament for Oldham
- In office 5 June 1872 – 13 February 1877 Serving with Frederick Spinks (1874–1877); J. T. Hibbert (1872–1874)
- Preceded by: John Platt; J. T. Hibbert
- Succeeded by: J. T. Hibbert; Frederick Spinks
- In office 7 July 1852 – 11 July 1865 Serving with J. T. Hibbert (1862–1865); William Johnson Fox (1857–1862); James Platt (1857–1857); William Johnson Fox (1852–1857); John Duncuft (1852–1852)
- Preceded by: William Johnson Fox; John Duncuft
- Succeeded by: John Platt; J. T. Hibbert

Personal details
- Born: 1800
- Died: 13 February 1877 (aged 76)
- Resting place: West Street Cemetery, Farnham, Surrey
- Party: Conservative
- Other political affiliations: Liberal Party (UK) (until 1868)
- Spouse: Mary Fielden (1817-1896)
- Children: Mary Cobbett (1852-1913); John Fielden Cobbett (1856-1918); William Morgan Cobbett (1860-1915)
- Parent(s): William Cobbett, Anne Reid

John Morgan Cobbett (13 November 1800 – 13 February 1877) was a Conservative Party and Liberal Party politician.

Trained as a barrister, he was the second son of the English pamphleteer, farmer, journalist and Member of Parliament William Cobbett, author of Rural Rides (1830) and his wife Anne née Reid. In 1851, he married Mary Fielden, the daughter of John Fielden, his father's fellow-member for Oldham.

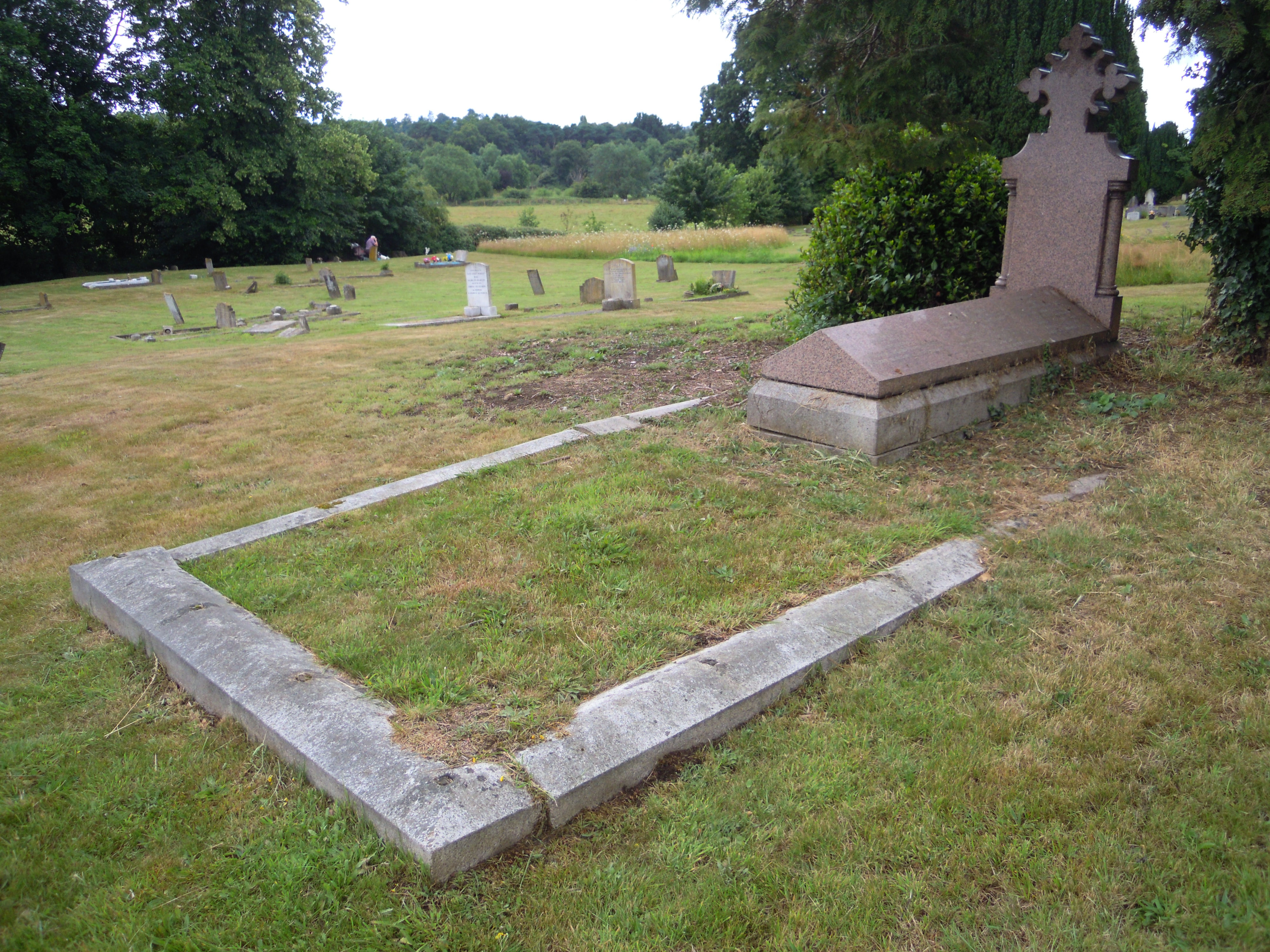
Grave of John Morgan Cobbett and family members in West Street Cemetery in Farnham in Surrey

John Morgan Cobbett's political affiliations are complicated. He had stood unsuccessfully at Oldham on an all-Radical "plague on both your houses" slate with John Fielden in 1847. He was elected in 1852 as the Radical half of an explicit Radical-Tory alliance. At the 1857 election, he was opposed by two Liberals and denied that he had sold out to Palmerston, asserting that the Liberal Chief Whip had no confidence in him. In 1865 he stood unsuccessfully in conjunction with a Conservative, opposed by two Liberals.

Nonetheless, from 1852 to 1865, outside Oldham he was generally taken to be a Liberal. He contested Oldham as a Conservative in 1868 (unsuccessfully) and was elected as a Conservative at a by-election in 1872 - and was thereby the last MP in the UK to be elected by public (rather than secret) ballot. From 1872 to his death in 1877, he sat as a Conservative (but one calling for annual Parliaments and manhood suffrage).

He is buried in a family plot at the West Street Cemetery in Farnham in Surrey.

Parliament of the United Kingdom
Preceded by John Platt; J. T. Hibbert	Member of Parliament for Oldham; 1872–1877; With: Frederick Spinks (1874–1877); J. T. Hibbert (1872–1874)	Succeeded by J. T. Hibbert; Frederick Spinks
Preceded by William Johnson Fox; John Duncuft	Member of Parliament for Oldham; 1852–1865; With: J. T. Hibbert (1862–1865); William Johnson Fox (1857–1862); James Platt (1857–1857); William Johnson Fox (1852–1857); John Duncuft (1852–1852)	Succeeded by John Platt; J. T. Hibbert
