= 1877 Oldham by-election =

UK Parliamentary by-election

The 1877 Oldham by-election was fought on 1 March 1877. The by-election was fought due to the death of the incumbent Conservative MP, John Morgan Cobbett. It was won by the Liberal candidate J. T. Hibbert.

1877 Oldham by-election
Party	Candidate	Votes	%	±%
Liberal	✓ J. T. Hibbert	9,542	51.9	+2.4
Conservative	Thomas Evans Lees	8,831	48.1	−2.4
Majority		711	3.8	N/A
Turnout		18,373	90.7	−0.6
Registered electors		20,249		
Liberal gain from Conservative		Swing	+2.4	
