= Dolce =

Dolce may refer to:

== Places ==
- Dolcè, a municipality in Italy
- Dolce (Plzeň-South District), a municipality and village in the Czech Republic
- Dolce, a village and part of Jesenice (Příbram District) in the Czech Republic

== People ==
- Dolce (surname)
- Dolce dell'Anguillara (1401–1449), Italian condottiero
- Dolce Ann Cabot (1862–1943), New Zealand journalist

== Music ==
- Dolce (music), to play sweetly
- Dolce (album), a 2008 album by J-Pop artist Ami Suzuki

== Other ==
- Dolce (satellite television), Romanian satellite television provider
- DOLCE, acronym for "Descriptive Ontology for Linguistic and Cognitive Engineering"
- Dolce Hotels and Resorts, founded by Andy Dolce in 1981 in Houston, Texas
- "Dolce" (Hannibal), an episode of the television series Hannibal

== See also ==
- Dolce Vita (disambiguation)
- Dolci (disambiguation), plural of dolce
- Dulce (disambiguation)
