= Cobbett =

Cobbett is a surname. Notable people with the surname include:

- Anne Cobbett (1795–1877), British author
- Edward John Cobbett (1815–1899), English watercolour and oil painter
- Hilary Dulcie Cobbett (1885–1976), British artist
- Pitt Cobbett (1853–1919), Australian academic, jurist, and editor
- John Morgan Cobbett (1800–1877), Conservative Party and Liberal Party politician
- William Cobbett (1763–1835), British radical agriculturist and prolific journalist.
- Walter Willson Cobbett (1847–1937), British author of Cobbett's Cyclopedic Survey of Chamber Music.
