= Dulcie =

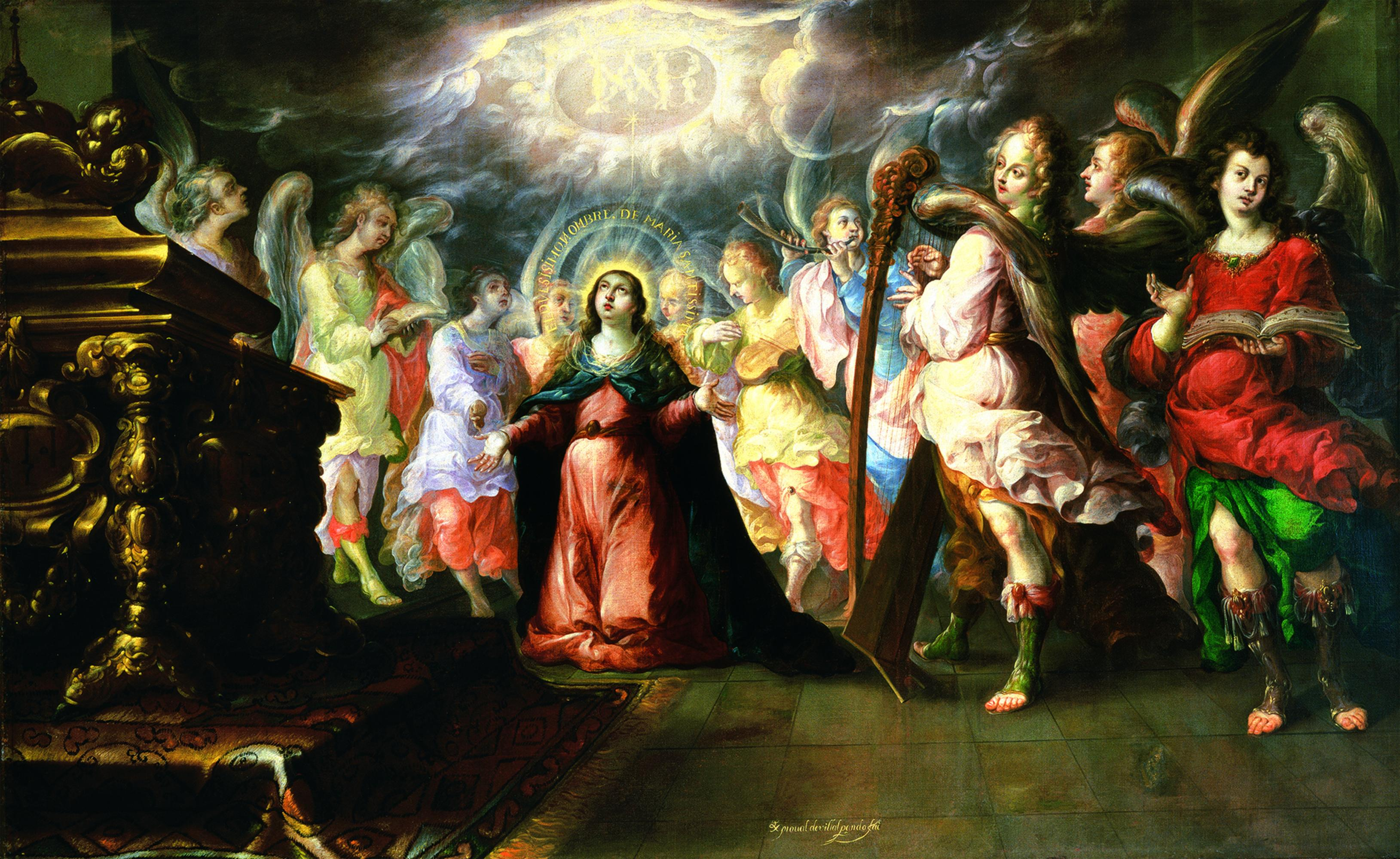
- El Dulce nombre de María or The Sweet Name of Mary by Cristóbal de Villalpando.
- Gender: Feminine
- Language: English via Latin

Origin
- Meaning: sweet

Dulcie is an English feminine given name derived from the Latin dulcis, meaning sweet. It has been in use in the Anglosphere since the 1800s. It was a recreation in a new form of Duce, Douce, or Dowse, an older English name in use since the Middle Ages that was derived from the same Latin source word. Dulcia was a form of the name in use in the Later Roman Empire. Dulcis and Dulceta were both in use in records recorded in Latin in medieval France, where the name came from the Old French words dolz or dous and Middle French words doux and douce, all also from the Latin dulcis. The names Dolcis and Dulcis are found in Latin records in medieval Italy; Dulcia and Dulciae in Latin records in medieval Portugal. Dowsabel or Dousabel, or Dulcibel or Dulcibella in modern English, was derived from the Latin dulcis in combination with bellus, or beautiful, and also had the connotation of sweetheart.

Dulce is a Spanish form of the name that is often used in combination with the name Maria. Dulce María is a title used by Catholics for Mary, mother of Jesus that is sometimes translated into English as Blessed Mary or Blessed Virgin Mary. Dulcinea is a Spanish elaboration of the name popularized by its use by Miguel de Cervantes for an idealized imaginary female character in his novel Don Quixote. Dulcinée is the French version of this name.

== Usage ==
Dulcie has been among the top 1,000 names for girls in England and Wales since 1997. It was among the top 100 names for girls born in New Zealand between 1907 and 1931. It was among the top 1,000 names for girls born in the United States at different times between 1880 and 1905, but then declined in use. It was used for five American girls born in 2022.

== Notable people ==
- Dulcie Boling (born 1936), Australian businesswoman and magazine editor
- Hilary Dulcie Cobbett (1885–1976), English watercolor and oil painter
- Dulcie Cooper (1903–1981), Australian actress
- Dulcie Deamer (1890–1972), Australian novelist, poet, journalist and actor
- Dulcie Foo Fat (born 1946), British-born Canadian landscape painter
- Dulcie Gray (1915–2011), British actress
- Dulcie Hartwell (1915–2012), South Africa trade union leader
- Dulcie Holland (1913–2000), Australian composer and music educator
- Dulcie Howes (1908–1993), South African ballet dancer
- Dulcie Markham (1914–1976), Australian prostitute and associate of gangland figures
- Dulcie Ethel Adunola Oguntoye (1923–2018), English-born Nigerian jurist who was the country's second female judge
- Dulcie Mary Pillers (1891–1961), English medical illustrator
- Dulcie September (1935–1988), South African anti-apartheid political activist who was assassinated
- Dulcie Tei (fl. 2022–present), Tongan politician
- Dulcie Wood (fl. 1953–1961?), South Africa former cricketer
- Dulcie Boateng, Ghanaian businesswoman

== Fictional characters ==
- the title character of Defining Dulcie, a young adult novel by Paul Acampora
- the title character of Dulcie's Adventure, a 1916 American silent film
- a computer in "Dulcie and Decorum", a science fiction short story by Damon Knight
- Dulcie Collins, one of the main characters in the Australian series Deadloch
- Dulcie Duveen, Arthur Hastings' future wife in The Murder on the Links detective novel by Dame Agatha Christie
- Dulcie Maes, in the film adaptation of The Best Little Whorehouse in Texas musical
- Dulcie Wintle, in the 1957 children's novel Wintle's Wonders by Noel Streatfeild

== See also ==
- Dulcie Ranges National Park, national park in the Northern Territory, Australia
- Dulce (disambiguation)
