= Dulce (given name) =

Dulce is a feminine given name.

Dulce, the Spanish form of Dulcie, has been ranked among the top 1,000 names for newborn girls in the United States since 1990. The variant Dulce Maria has been among the top 100 names for girls in Mexico since 2020.

== Dulce ==
- Dulce, (1955-2024), Mexican singer and actress
- Dulce of Aragon (1160–1198), wife of King Sancho I of Portugal
- Dulce of León (1194/5–1248), briefly suo jure Queen of León
- Dulce Beatriz (1931–2021), Cuban-born painter
- Dulce Braga (born 1958), Angolan author
- Dulce Canela (born 1995), Mexican professional wrestler
- Dulce Carranza (born 1990), Mexican volleyball player
- Dulce Chacón (1954–2003), Spanish poet, novelist and playwright
- Dulce Figueiredo (1923–2011), wife of former Brazilian President João Figueiredo
- Dulce García, Mexican professional wrestler and boxer, ring name Sexy Star
- Dulce Ann Hofer (born 1967), Filipina educator and politician
- Dulce Soledad Ibarra (born 1992), American artist, curator, educator
- Dulce María Loynaz (1902–1997), Cuban poet
- Dulce María (born 1985), Mexican actress
- Dulce Nunes (1929–2020), Brazilian actress and singer-songwriter
- Dulce Pássaro (born 1953), Portuguese engineer and politician
- Dulce Piña (born 1966), Dominican retired judoka
- Dulce Pinzon (born 1974), Mexican artistic photographer
- Dulce Pontes (born 1969), Portuguese singer and songwriter
- Dulce Quental (born 1960), Brazilian singer and composer
- Dulce Quintana (born 1989), Paraguayan footballer
- Dulce Saguisag (1944–2007), Filipina politician
- Dulcé Sloan (born 1983), American standup comedian and actress
- Dulce Téllez (born 1983), Cuban volleyball player

== Dulce Maria ==
- Dulce Maria Alavez (born 2014), American girl missing since 2019
- Dulce María Borrero (1883–1945), Cuban poet and essayist
- Dulce Maria Cardoso (born 1964), Portuguese writer
- Dulce María González (1958–2014), Mexican writer and educator
- Dulce María Loynaz (1902–1997), Cuban poet
- Dulce Maria García Rivas (born 1982), Mexican professional wrestler who uses the ring name Sexy Star
- Dulce María Sauri Riancho (born 1951), Mexican politician
- Dulce María Espinosa Saviñón (born 1985), Mexican actress, songwriter, singer, and author
- Dulce María Serret (1898–1989), Cuban pianist and music teacher
