= Rural Rides =

1830 book by William Cobbett

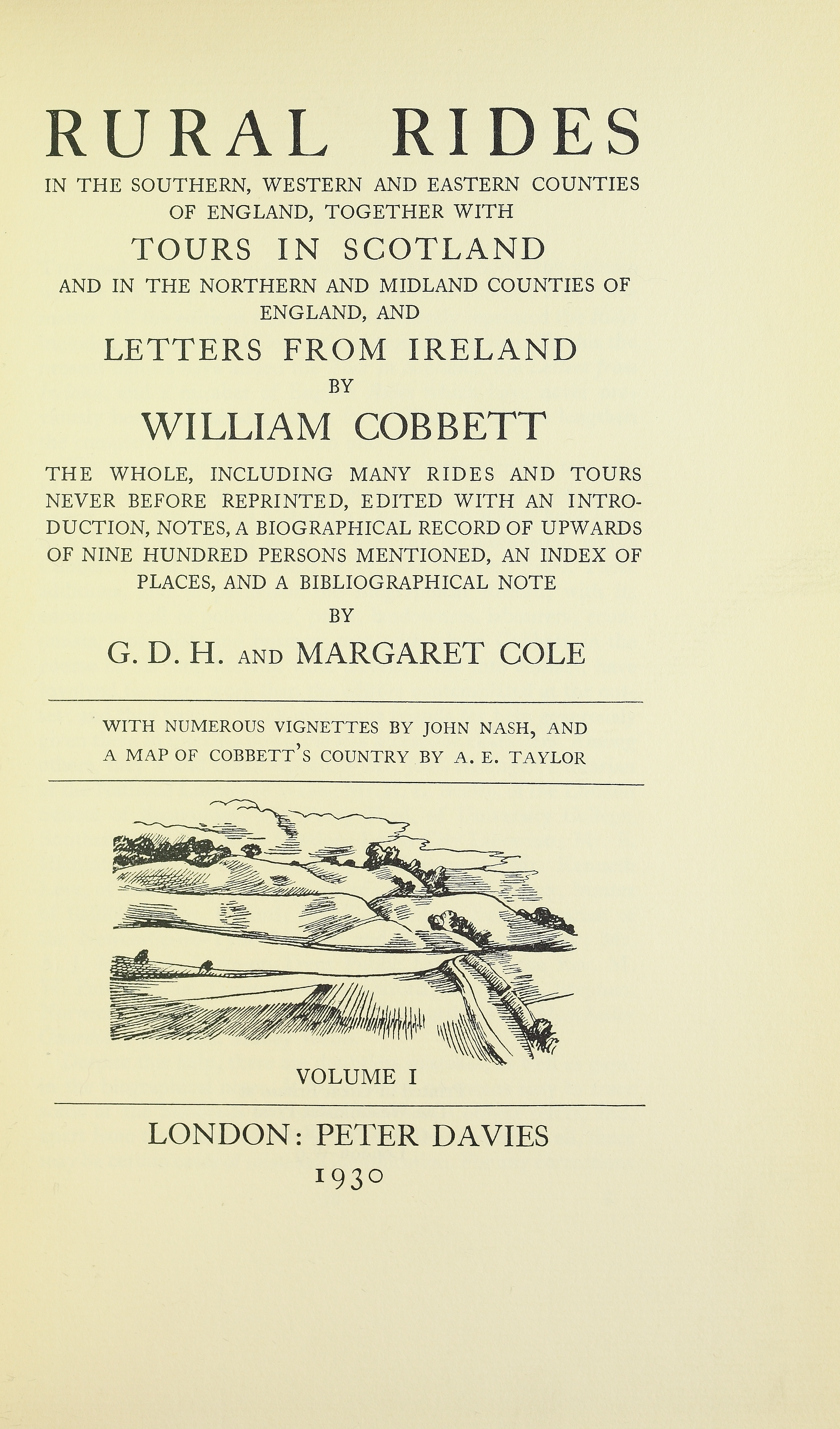
- Author: William Cobbett
- Language: English
- Publisher: The Political Register
- Publication date: Serialised 1822–1826
- Publication place: Great Britain
- English publication date: 1830 in 2 volumes

Rural Rides is the book for which the English journalist, agriculturist and political reformer William Cobbett is best known.

At the time of writing in the early 1820s, Cobbett was a radical anti-Corn Law campaigner, newly returned to England from a spell of self-imposed political exile in the United States.

Cobbett disapproved of proposals for remedies for agricultural distress suggested in Parliament in 1821. He made up his mind to see rural conditions for himself, and to "enforce by actual observation of rural conditions" the statements he had made in answer to the arguments of the landlords before the Parliamentary Agricultural Committee.

He embarked on a series of journeys by horseback through the countryside of Southeast England and the English Midlands. He wrote down what he saw from the points of view both of a farmer and a social reformer. The result documents the early 19th-century countryside and its people, as well as giving free vent to Cobbett's opinions.

He first published his observations in serial form in the Political Register, between 1822 and 1826. Four rides – from 1822, 1823, 1825 and 1826 – were first published in book form in two volumes in 1830. In 1853, his son James published an expanded edition, including rides from 1821, as well as his father's 1830–32 political tours to the Midlands, North and Scotland.

== Editions ==
- Penguin Classics; new edition (27 Sep 2001) ISBN 0-14-043579-4. Introduction and notes by Ian Dyck.
- Constable; abridged hardcover edition (Sep 1982) ISBN 0-09-464060-2. Introduction by E. R. Chamberlain.
- J. M. Dent & Sons; Everyman's Library (1912), reprinted 1924 and 1953, ASIN B00085HPA0. Introduction by Edward Thomas.
- J. M. Dent & Sons; Everyman's Library (1912), reprinted 1957, Introduction by Asa Briggs.
- Rural Rides in the Counties of Surrey, Kent, Sussex, Hampshire.... Original publication by Cobbett, 1830 and 1853.
