= Dulce =

Dulce may refer to:

== Places ==
- Dulce, New Mexico, United States, a census-designated place
  - Dulce Base, in conspiracy theories a secret American military facility near the census-designated place
- Golfo Dulce, Costa Rica
- Dulce River (disambiguation)

== People ==
- Dulce (given name)
- Dulce (footballer) (born 1982), Brazilian footballer Dúlcia Maria Davi
- Dulce (Filipino singer) (born 1961), stage name of Filipino singer and actress Maria Abellare Llamedo-Cruzata
- Dulce (Mexican singer) (1955–2024), Mexican singer and actress Bertha Noeggerath Cárdenas
- Dulce Gardenia (born 1992), stage name of Mexican professional wrestler Javier Márquez Gómez

== Music ==
- Dulce (album), by Sun City Girls, or the title song, 1998
- "Dulce" (song), by Francisca Valenzuela, 2006

== Food and drink ==
- Dulce (wine), a sweet variety of sparkling wine

== See also ==
- Dulce de leche, milk-based syrup
- Pan dulce, Latin American "sweet bread"
- Dolce (disambiguation)
- Dulcie, a feminine given name
- Dulce Maria, a variant of the given name
- Dulse, red algae
