= Cottage Economy =

Book by William Cobbett

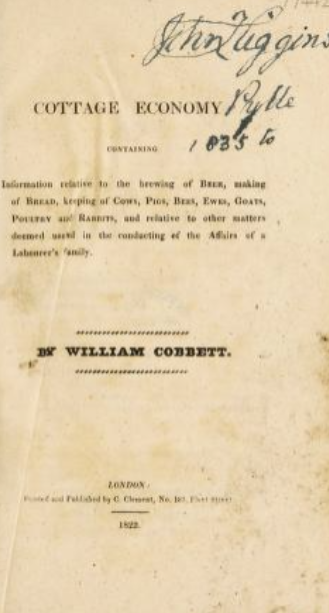
- Title page for Cottage Economy (1822)
- Author: William Cobbett
- Language: English
- Subject: Agriculture, Labour, Poverty, Economics, Politics
- Published: 1822
- Publication place: United Kingdom
- Media type: Print

Cottage Economy is a book by William Cobbett, first published in 1821, which covers many practical instructions such how to bake bread, brew beer, keep livestock and "other matters deemed useful in the conducting of the Affairs of a Labourer's Family" with the aim of aiding the "Labouring Classes" in having a "good living". It is considered to be a timeless guide on matters of self-sufficiency.

There was a copy of Cottage Economy in the book collection of Andrew Jackson Jr., son of U.S. president Andrew Jackson.
