= Dulce River =

Dulce River may refer to:

- Dulce River (Guatemala)
- Dulce River (Argentina)

== Other ==
- Cricovul Dulce River
- Izvorul Dulce River

== See also ==
- Dulce (disambiguation)
