= Dolci =

Dolci may refer to:

- Dolci, an Italian surname:
  - Angelo Dolci (1867-1939), Italian cardinal
  - Carlo Dolci (1616-1686), Italian painter
  - Danilo Dolci (1924-1997), Italian social activist, sociologist, popular educator and poet
  - Sebastiano Dolci (1699-1777), Croatian writer
- Dolci, Croatia, a village near Orahovica
- Plural of dolce, Italian desserts

== See also ==
- Dolce (disambiguation), singular of dolci
