= Joseph William Allen =

English painter

Joseph William Allen RBA (1803 – 29 August 1852) was an English landscape painter and art teacher, who was also active in the founding of the Society of British Artists.

== Life and work ==
Allen was born in Lambeth, London, the son of a schoolmaster, and attended St Paul's School. Later, he worked for a time as an usher at a school in Taunton in Somerset. Discovering a talent for art, he returned to London, determined to become a painter. He initially found employment as an assistant to an art dealer, under whom he acquired a considerable knowledge of the old masters, and the monetary value of their works. He then became a (theatre) scene painter, in association with Charles Tomkins and Clarkson Stanfield, and painted most of the scenery during Lucia Vestris's first tenure of the Olympic Theatre in Drury Lane.

His natural talent, however, was for painting pastoral landscapes, and his work soon attracted admirers and purchasers. The Vale of Clwyd, exhibited in 1847, created a considerable sensation, and was purchased by an Art Union prizeholder for three hundred guineas - Allen repeated it twice in smaller dimensions, for other purchasers. His Leith Hill (1848), was almost equally successful. His subjects consisted chiefly of views in North Wales, Cheshire, Yorkshire, and the midland counties. His first paintings were watercolour but later he switched to oils. Eleven of his pictures were exhibited at the Royal Academy of Arts.

Allen was active in the establishment of the Society of British Artists and became its secretary, his loyalty to the newly formed organisation shown by the fact that he refused to exhibit anywhere else in London apart from its Gallery in Suffolk Street. There is little doubt that his presence heightened the reputation of the society for landscape painting. He was also professor of drawing at the City of London School, from its opening in 1834.

Allen died in 1852. His pupils included Edward John Cobbett.

Three of his paintings were bought for the Royal Collection by Prince Albert, and on his death, his wife and children being left in poverty, Queen Victoria and Prince Albert contributed £25 towards their support. One of his paintings, of Bath from Lyncombe Hill, hangs in the Building of Bath Collection. Two of his watercolours are in the Faringdon Collection (London), part of the Buscot Park collection. Others of his works are held by the Victoria and Albert Museum, the Tate, Eton, and the British Museum.
