= Dolce Vita =

Dolce vita or la dolce vita is Italian for "the sweet life". It may refer to:

== Books ==
- The First Intimate Contact (1998), also known as Dolce Vita, novel by Taiwanese author Pi Zicai

== Film and TV ==
- La Dolce Vita (1960), film directed by Federico Fellini
- Michael Lucas' La Dolce Vita (2006), gay pornographic remake of the 1960 Federico Fellini film
- Immigrants (L.A. Dolce Vita) (2008), Hungarian animated film
- Dolce Vita (TV programme) (2000), TV programme in Hong Kong about lifestyles and entertainment
- Dolce Vita (1995 TV series), a Greek comedy television series
- Totò, Peppino e... la dolce vita (1961), Italian film parodying Fellini's film

== Music ==
=== Albums ===
- La Dolce Vita, soundtrack by Nino Rota of the 1960 Fellini film of the same name
- Dolce vita (1981), album by Spider Murphy Gang
- Dolce Vita (2016), album by Jonas Kaufmann
- La Dolce Vita – Det bästa 1982–2003 (2003), compilation album and single by Swedish pop musician Mauro Scocco
- Dolce Vita (Okean Elzy album) (2010), album by rock band Okean Elzy
- La Dolce Vita (2008), a contemporary jazz album by Warren Hill (musician)
- La Dolce Vita, an unreleased debut album by former Murder Inc. Records artist Vita

=== Songs ===
- "Dolce Vita" (Ryan Paris song), 1983
- "Dolce Vita" (Sophie Ellis-Bextor song), 2025
- "La dolce vita" (After Dark song), 2004
- "La dolce vita" (Fedez song), 2022
- "La Dolce Vita" (2004), a song by Zazie from her album Rodéo
- "La Dolce Vita" (1979), song by Sparks from their album, No. 1 in Heaven
- "La dolce vita", by Anneli Saaristo, Finland's entry in the 1989 Eurovision Song Contest
- "La Dolce Vita", song from In Between (Paul van Dyk album) (2007)
- "Dolce Vita", song by The 69 Eyes (2015)
- "Dolce Vita", song by Ekatarina Velika (1991)

== Enterprises ==
- La Dolce Vita (barge), a hotel barge in Venice
- Orient Express La Dolce Vita, a luxury train service around Italy
- Dolce Vita (1996), perfume by Christian Dior
- Dolce Vita, a 25-floor tower in the Dubai Marina in Dubai

== See also ==
- Dolce far niente, literally "sweetness [of] doing nothing, sweet idleness", an Italian saying
- , which also includes all articles with titles containing "La Dolce Vita"
