= Dulce Soledad Ibarra =

American artist (born 1991)

Dulce Soledad Ibarra (born 1991) is an American multidisciplinary artist, educator, curator, and activist. Ibarra's pronouns are they/them/theirs. They are Latinx, and their work explores ethnicity, identity, class, labor, and the immigrant experience in the United States. Ibarra has worked in sculpture, installation art, performance art, video and new media art, illustration, and textiles. They lives in Los Angeles.

== Biography ==
Dulce Soledad Ibarra was born in 1991, in Chino, California. They are queer, and used the pronouns they/them/theirs.

Ibarra received a Bachelor of Fine Arts degree in 2017 in sculpture from the California State University, Long Beach. They continued her studies at the Roski School of Art and Design at the University of Southern California (USC), and graduated with a Master of Fine Arts degree in 2020.

While attending undergrad they started to explore artistic themes of identity, assimilation, and the relationship of generational trauma found in Latino families. During the COVID-19 pandemic, Ibarra explored the digital art and performance art for their practice. After their time receiving education, Ibarra created a career as a working artist, and curator. Beginning in 2021, they started teaching at Mount San Jacinto College in Riverside County, California.

Ibarra has been recognized for their dedication to smaller spaces and communities.

== Exhibitions ==
- Liberate the Bar! Queer Nightlife, Activism, and Spacemaking (2019), group exhibition, One Gallery, West Hollywood, California
- Madre Myths (2023), solo exhibition, Mount San Jacinto College Art Gallery, San Jacinto, California
- I wanna sleep forever (2024), group exhibition, Coaxial Arts, Los Angeles, California
- Mis/Communication: Language and Power in Contemporary Art (2024), group exhibition, Samuel Dorsky Museum of Art at SUNY New Paltz, New Paltz, New York
