= Dolce (surname) =

Dolce is an Italian-Sicilian surname. Notable people with the name include:

- Christine Dolce (1981–2017), American MySpace Internet celebrity and model
- Domenico Dolce (born 1958), Italian fashion designer
- Joe Dolce (born 1947), American-Australian singer/songwriter
- Lodovico Dolce (1508–1568), Italian humanist of the Renaissance
