= Dulcie Ethel Adunola Oguntoye =

English-born Nigerian jurist (1923–2018)

Chief Dulcie Ethel Adunola Oguntoye OFR (née Dulcie Ethel King; 29 May 1923 – 12 November 2018) was an English-born Nigerian jurist who was the country's second female judge.

== Early and personal life ==
Oguntoye was born at Gravesend, Kent in England. Serving in the Women's Auxiliary Air Force during World War II then enrolling to study law at the Middle Temple Inns of Court. She married Chief David Ojo Abiodun Oguntoye, the first Ijesha lawyer, whom she met during the War while he was also serving in the Royal Air Force, on 16 November 1946. They later moved to Ibadan. He gave her the name "Adunola". He married another five wives after her. They established a law firm, Oguntoye & Oguntoye in 1949. Her husband died in June 1997.

== Career ==
In 1960, Oguntoye renounced her British citizenship in order to serve in the Nigerian judiciary. In 1961, she joined the Western Region Magistracy. In 1967, she became Chief Magistrate in Lagos.

In February 1976, Oguntoye was appointed to the Lagos State High Court, the first woman on the Lagos State bench and the second female judge in Nigeria after Modupe Omo-Eboh. She was transferred to the newly created Oyo State in 1978, and retired from the bench in 1988. In 1978, she was named an Officer of the Order of the Federal Republic by Head of State Olusegun Obasanjo. She was honoured with the title of the Iyalode of the town of Imesi-ile in the Nigerian chieftaincy system.

Oguntoye's autobiography, Your Estranged Faces, was published in 2013. In 2016, the Nigerian Legal Awards honoured her for her contribution to the country's legal profession.
