= Disappearance of Dulce Maria Alavez =

2019 missing child case in New Jersey, United States

Dulce Maria Alavez
- Dulce Maria Alavez's FBI missing poster
- Born: April 25, 2014; Bridgeton, New Jersey, U.S.
- Disappeared: September 16, 2019 (aged 5); Bridgeton City Park, Bridgeton, New Jersey, U.S.
- Status: Missing for 7 years, 1 month and 23 days
- Parent: Noema Alavez Perez

Dulce Maria Alavez (born April 25, 2014 – disappeared September 16, 2019) is an American girl who vanished near Bridgeton City Park in Bridgeton, New Jersey, and is believed to have been abducted. A reward has been offered for finding Alavez.

== Disappearance ==
Location
1 Bridgeton City Park

On September 16, 2019, 5-year-old Dulce Maria Alavez and her brother were playing on the swings, while Alavez's pregnant mother was in her car, 30 yards away. She was playing a scratch-off lottery ticket and helping her younger sister with her homework. It was around 4 pm to 6 pm (ET) when Alavez suddenly vanished from the playground. Alavez's mother went to see where her children were and found Alavez’s brother by himself crying at the swings.

== Search and aftermath ==
Over 30 police officers were part of a search party who looked in the nearby woods, but found nothing. The suspect is described as a light-skinned Hispanic male around 5'8 tall driving a red van. Police have no strong suspects as of June 15, 2023.

Dr. Phil and In Pursuit with John Walsh carried segments about the disappearance.

In February 2021, following leads, a search for Alavez was conducted in Austintown, Ohio.

In 2020 a false claim that Alavez had been located deceased was spread on social media. In 2021, along with the National Center for Missing and Exploited Children releasing two age-progression images of Alavez as a seven-year-old, FBI special agent Daniel Garrabrant said, "The offender that took Dulce was likely there for a period of time. It was a crime of opportunity. They were looking for a child, maybe their age or gender."

Investigators have used artificial intelligence to create images of Alavez as she would appear as she grew older.

In 2025, following a report that Alavez had been found dead in a wooded area, Cumberland County Prosecutor Jennifer Webb-McRae said, "Please be advised that these reports are not confirmed and are untrue. No one has reported finding remains at this time.”

== See also ==
- List of people who disappeared mysteriously (2000–present)
