= Anne Cobbett =

American-born British author and publisher (1795–1877)

- Born: 11 July 1795; Philadelphia, U.S.
- Died: 22 October 1877 (aged 82); Brompton Crescent, Kensington, England
- Occupations: Author; publisher
- Notable work: The English Housekeeper: The Manual of Domestic Management

Anne Cobbett (11 July 1795 – 22 October 1877) was an American-born British writer, known particularly for The English Housekeeper: The Manual of Domestic Management, and a publisher.

== Early life and education ==
Anne Cobbett was born to William and Anne Cobbett (née Reid) on 11 July 1795, in Philadelphia. She was the eldest surviving child in the family. From 1805, Cobbett lived at Botley with her family, initially at Botley House and then Botley Hill.

From 1810 to 1812, Cobbett stayed with her father at Newgate Prison where she lived with her father, who was imprisoned for treasonous libel. There, she learned French and dancing, took dictation for her father's publication, The Register, and learned arithmetic via calculations about the family farm. When she and her father left the prison on 9 July, she was disappointed to find herself excluded from celebrations on their route home due to her sex. She was "rescued" from male company and made to breakfast with the wife of organisers, and then unable to attend a celebration dinner.

== Publishing and politics ==
Cobbett actively aided her father with his work in publishing. Her obituary reported that she was 'the custodian of his papers and his chief aid as amanuensis. A large part of Cobbett's most stirring matter went to the press in Miss Cobbett's handwriting.'

In 1820, Cobbett accompanied her father to celebrate the arrival of Caroline of Brunswick, who had arrived to assert her position as queen. Around this time, the family were struggling financially, and Cobbett remembered that she, her brother John and her father often ate mainly cauliflowers or salad. Pamphlets published by the family in support of the queen helped with their financial difficulties and in November 1820, the family celebrated what they saw as the Queen's victory in court by taking a coach to London to see the lights, ships and crowds. Cobbett personally felt that Caroline's cause was empowering to women.

Cobbett headed the family publishing business for years after her father's death in 1835. She published works from 137 Strand.

Cobbett continued her father's political legacy, publishing an abridged version of her father's political works in weekly editions, and advertising in the Chartist press.

She also had an interest in household management. In 1846, Cobbett published her mother's 'Instructions for Using Meal and Flour of Indian Corn' in a posthumous edition of her father's book Cottage Economy.

Cobbett published The English Housekeeper: The Manual of Domestic Management. Likely first published in the mid to late 1830s, the book was very successful, going into many editions, and being praised for its practical advice, recipes and index. Cobbett's recipes were widely used, reaching America and the South Carolinian household of Emily Wharton Sinkler. Her book included recipes for cleaning products as well as foods such as bubble and squeak and advice on gardening.

She also published French Verbs and Exercises by her sister, Susan.

== Death and legacy ==
Cobbett died aged 82 at Brompton Crescent on 22 October 1877 and was buried in Farnham, where her parents were buried.

Cobbett wrote an Account of the Family, published by the William Cobbett Society in 1999.

Some of Cobbett's letters are held in archives at Trinity College, Cambridge.
