= La Dolce Vita (barge) =

1897 Dutch cargo barge

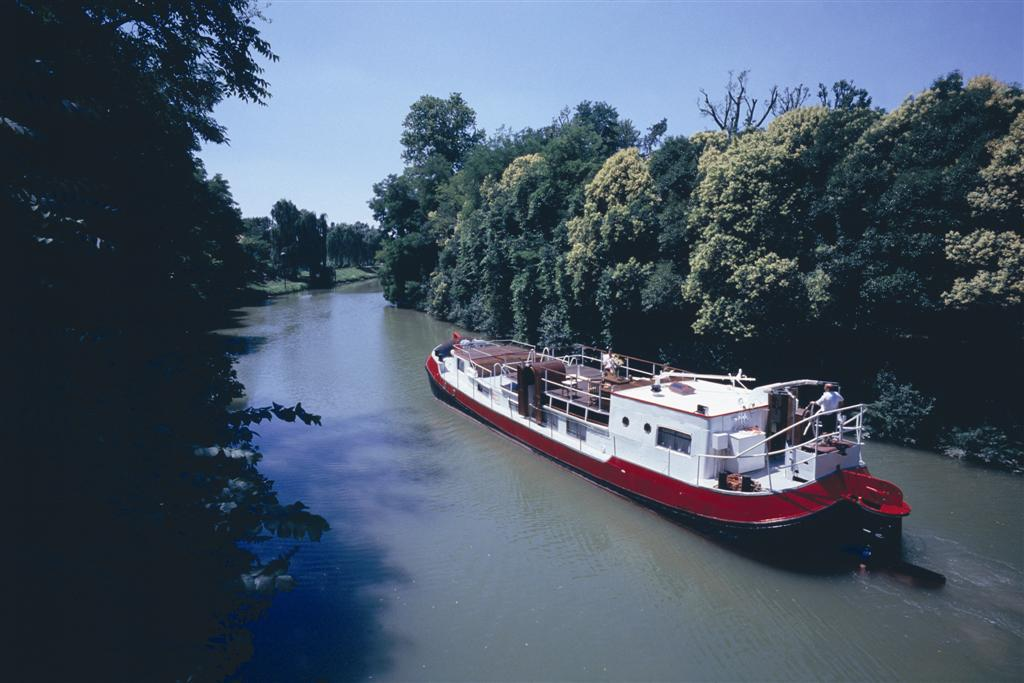
- La Dolce Vita

History

Italy
- Name: La Dolce Vita
- Owner: Giampaolo Friso
- Route: The lagoons surrounding Venice, the Venice Lido beach, and the Brenta River
- Launched: 1897
- Status: In service

General characteristics
- Class & type: Commercial passenger vessel
- Length: 21 m (68 ft 11 in)
- Beam: 4.9 m (16 ft 1 in)
- Decks: 1
- Installed power: 2 generators
- Propulsion: Deutz, 150 hp (110 kW)
- Speed: Maximum 5 knots (9.3 km/h; 5.8 mph)
- Capacity: 6 passengers
- Crew: 3 crew
- Notes: Holds 6,000 L (1,300 imp gal; 1,600 US gal) water; 3,000 L (660 imp gal; 790 US gal) fuel

La Dolce Vita (English: The sweet life) was built in 1897 in Groningen, Netherlands. She originally served as a cargo barge in the Netherlands. She serves as a hotel barge, owned by Giampaolo Friso.

== History ==
The original barge was powered by sail. She was first motorized in the 1950s and in the 1960s was lengthened by 10 m (33 ft) (with square chines). In 1975, she was purchased by Peter Mastenbroeks. She was shortened back to her original length of 23 m (75 ft) and her name was changed to Lobbes. In 1979, she was transformed into a sailing barge. She has worked in the Netherlands, throughout Scandinavia, France, and Italy. She has also sailed under the names of Hoop en Vertrouwen (English: Hope and Confidence), Gerris, and Lobbes.

She was sold in 1983 and continued to be operated as a sailing barge by a French couple. Around 1988, she was sold to a new owner in Venice and converted to a hotel barge in 1990. La Dolce Vita currently has three passenger cabins, allowing her to carry up to six passengers. She also has separate crew quarters which house the crew of three. The crew consists of the captain, tour guide/deck-hand, and chef. The crew is generally Italian with one crewmember who speaks English.

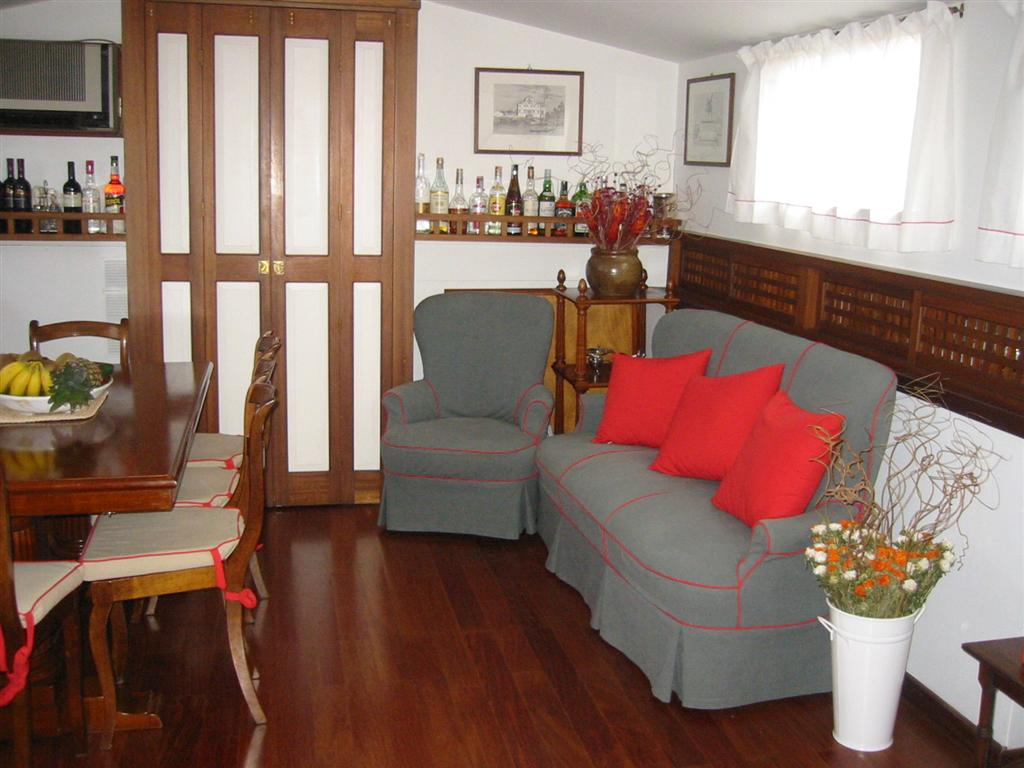

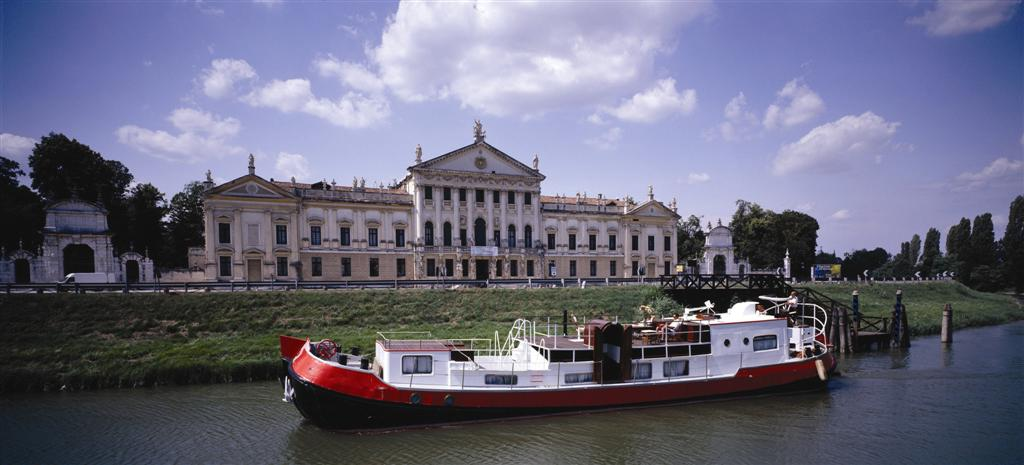

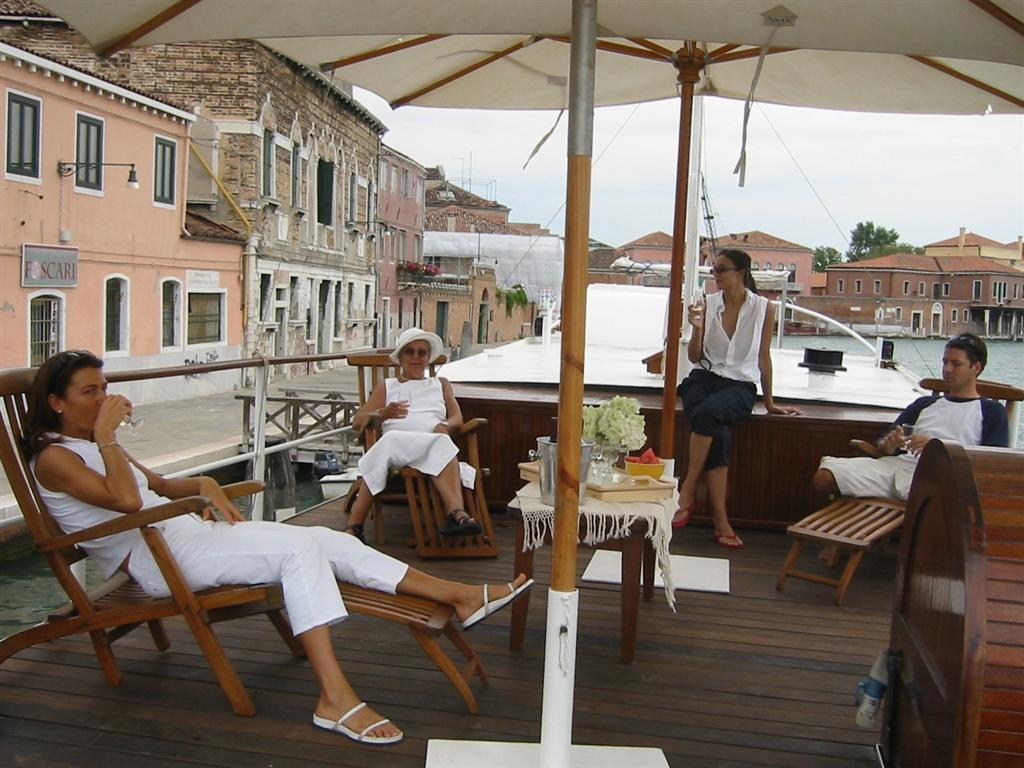
Passengers on deck.
