= Dulce Braga =

Angolan writer

- Born: 16 April 1958 (age 67)
- Occupation: Novelist
- Notable work: Sabor de Maboque

Dulce Braga (born 16 April 1958) is an Angolan author, author of the biographical novel Sabor de Maboque, published in 2009. In the novel, Braga recounts her experiences in 1975, at the beginning of the Angolan Civil War.

At the age of 16, she fled to Brazil with her family because of the war.
