= Ian Dyck =

Canadian historian

Ian Dyck (23 July 1954 – 15 July 2007) was a Canadian historian noted for his work on William Cobbett, an English radical journalist and politician. Dyck contributed Cobbett's biography to the Oxford Dictionary of National Biography.

Dyck was the son of Saskatchewan farmers and achieved BA and MA degrees from the University of Saskatchewan. He was an assistant Professor of History at Simon Fraser University, British Columbia. In 2007 he died of lymphocytic leukemia.

== Works ==
- Citizens of the World: Essays on Thomas Paine (editor) (Christopher Helm Publishers, 1987).
- William Cobbett and Rural Popular Culture (Cambridge University Press, 1992).
- 'Introduction' in William Cobbett, Rural Rides (Penguin Classics, 2005), pp. vii-xxviii.
