= Jesenice (Příbram District) =

- Municipality
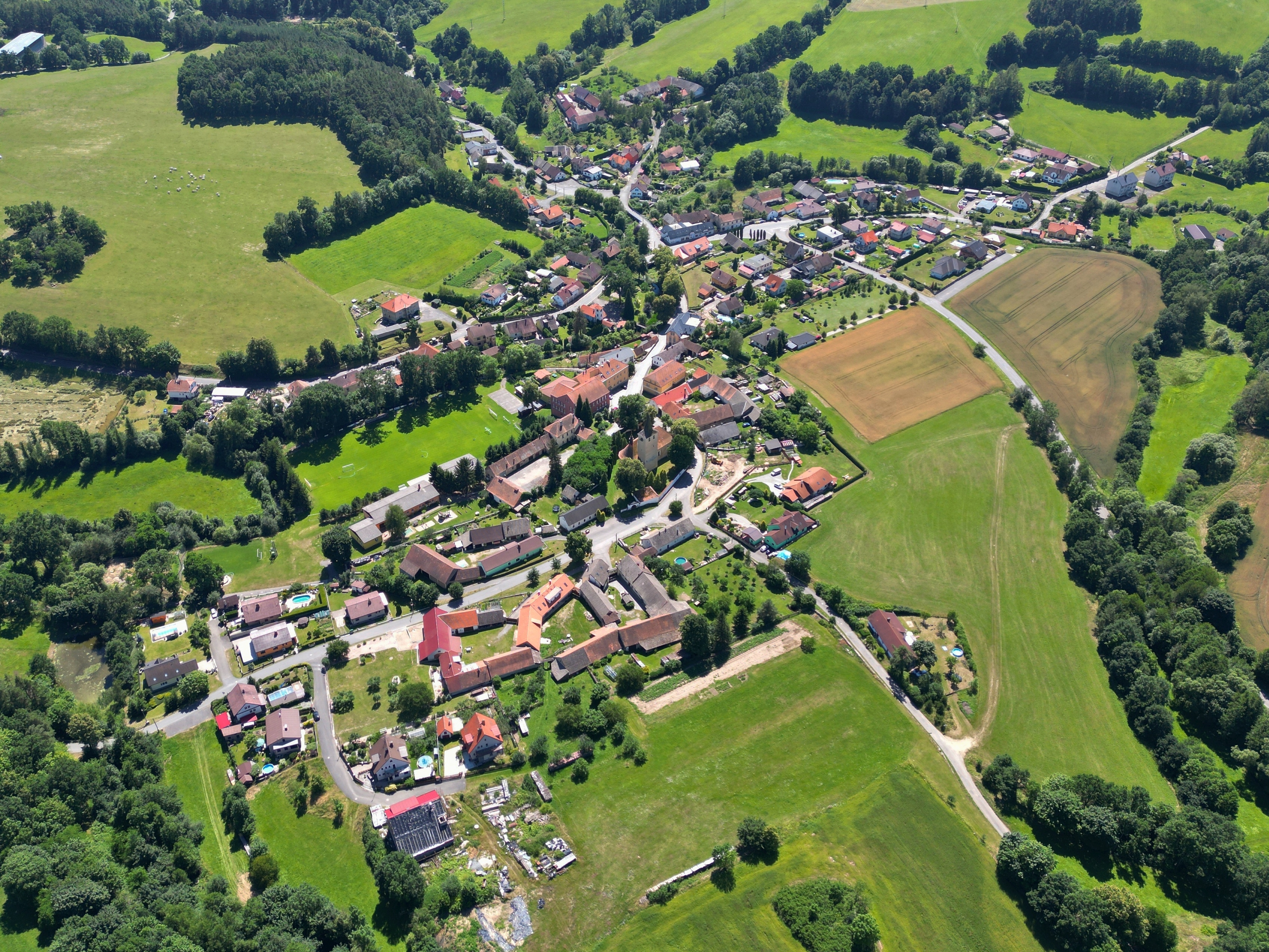
- Aerial view

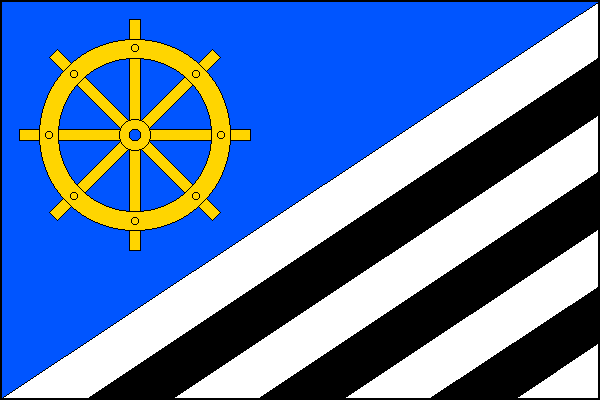
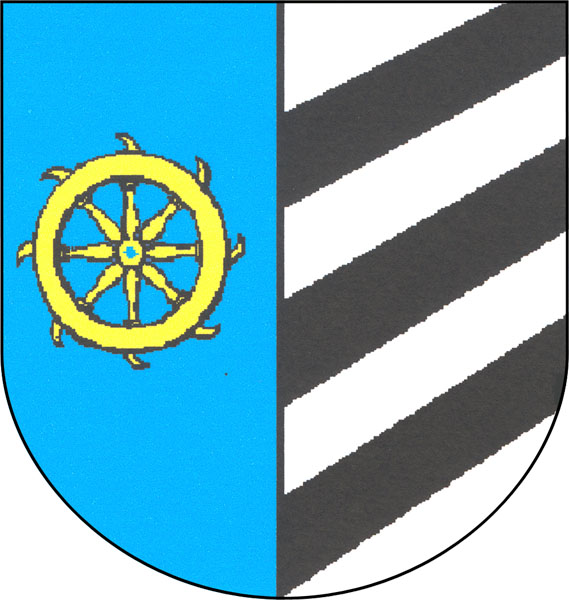
- Flag Coat of arms

- Location in the Czech Republic
- Coordinates: 49°36′28″N 14°28′41″E
- Country: Czech Republic
- Region: Central Bohemian
- District: Příbram
- First mentioned: 1352

Area
  - Total: 12.91 km^{2} (4.98 sq mi)
- Elevation: 373 m (1,224 ft)

Population (2026-01-01)
  - Total: 556
  - Density: 43.1/km^{2} (112/sq mi)
- Time zone: UTC+1 (CET)
  - Summer (DST): UTC+2 (CEST)
- Postal code: 264 01
- Website: www.jesenice-obec.cz

Jesenice is a municipality and village in Příbram District in the Central Bohemian Region of the Czech Republic. It has about 600 inhabitants.

== Administrative division ==
Jesenice consists of nine municipal parts (in brackets population according to the 2021 census):

- Jesenice (241)
- Boudy (54)
- Dobrošovice (59)
- Dolce (4)
- Doublovičky (68)
- Hulín (26)
- Martinice (24)
- Mezné (42)
- Vršovice (9)

== Etymology ==
The name is derived from the adjective jesenná (from jasan, i.e. 'ash') and originally denoted a meadow between ash trees or water flowing between ash trees.

== Geography ==
Jesenice is located about 35 kilometres (22 mi) east of Příbram and 47 km (29 mi) south of Prague. It lies in the Vlašim Uplands. The highest point is at 555 m (1,821 ft) above sea level. The stream Sedlecký potok flows through the municipality.

== History ==
The first written mention of Jesenice is from 1352.

== Demographics ==
Historical population

Year	Pop.	±%
1869	941	—
1880	961	+2.1%
1890	964	+0.3%
1900	888	−7.9%
1910	836	−5.9%

Year	Pop.	±%
1921	794	−5.0%
1930	769	−3.1%
1950	552	−28.2%
1961	615	+11.4%
1970	549	−10.7%

Year	Pop.	±%
1980	512	−6.7%
1991	529	+3.3%
2001	494	−6.6%
2011	528	+6.9%
2021	527	−0.2%

Source: Censuses

== Transport ==
There are no railways or major roads passing through the municipality.

== Sights ==
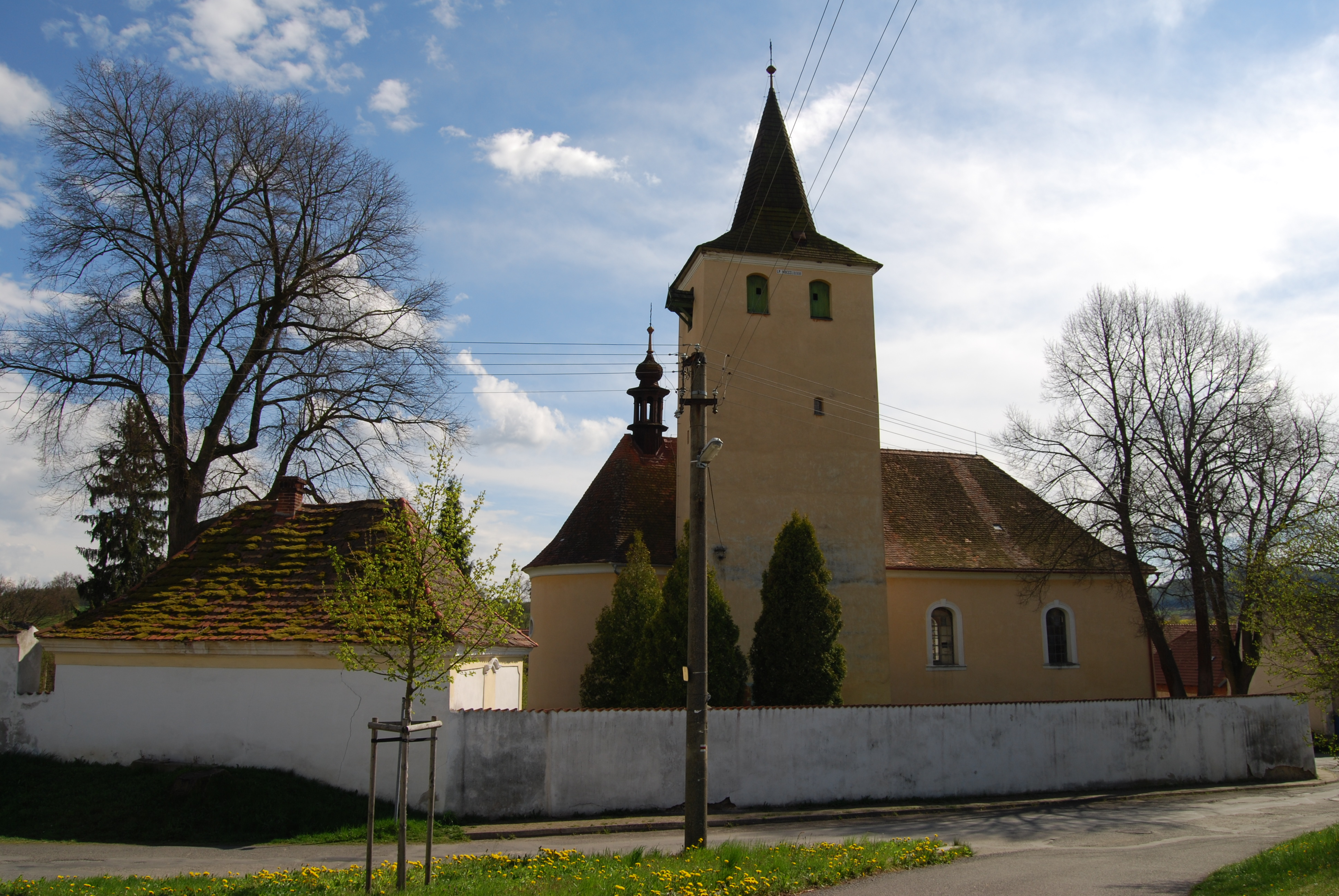
Church of the Holy Trinity

The main landmark of Jesenice is the Church of the Holy Trinity. It was originally an early Gothic church from the second half of the 13th century. In 1799, it was rebuilt in the Baroque style, but the tower and part of the perimeter walls from the original church were preserved.
