= Hilary Dulcie Cobbett =

English painter

Hilary Dulcie Cobbett (19 February 1885 – 26 February 1976) was an English watercolour and oil painter.

== Early life ==
Cobbett was born in Richmond, Surrey, the daughter of William Vines Holt Cobbett, a solicitor, and Kate Cobbett (née Sandilands). She was brought up in Richmond and studied at the Richmond School of Art from 1903 to 1905 and then again from 1924 to 1927.

== Career ==
In a long professional career Cobbett painted extensively in France, and also in Italy, Portugal, Belgium, Holland, and along the coasts of Cornwall, Devon, Sussex and Norfolk. She exhibited at the Royal Academy, Royal Society of British Artists, Royal Institute of Oil Painters, and Royal Institute of Painters in Water Colours. She was a founder member of the Royal Society of Marine Artists in 1939 and became a full member of the Society of Women Artists in 1961.

The art galleries where examples of her work can be seen include Orleans House in Richmond and the National Maritime Museum Cornwall.

== Personal life ==
Cobbett never married and died in Coulsdon, London, aged 91. She was related, by her sister’s marriage to the painter Edward John Cobbett.
