= William Cobbett =

English pamphleteer, farmer and journalist (1763–1835)

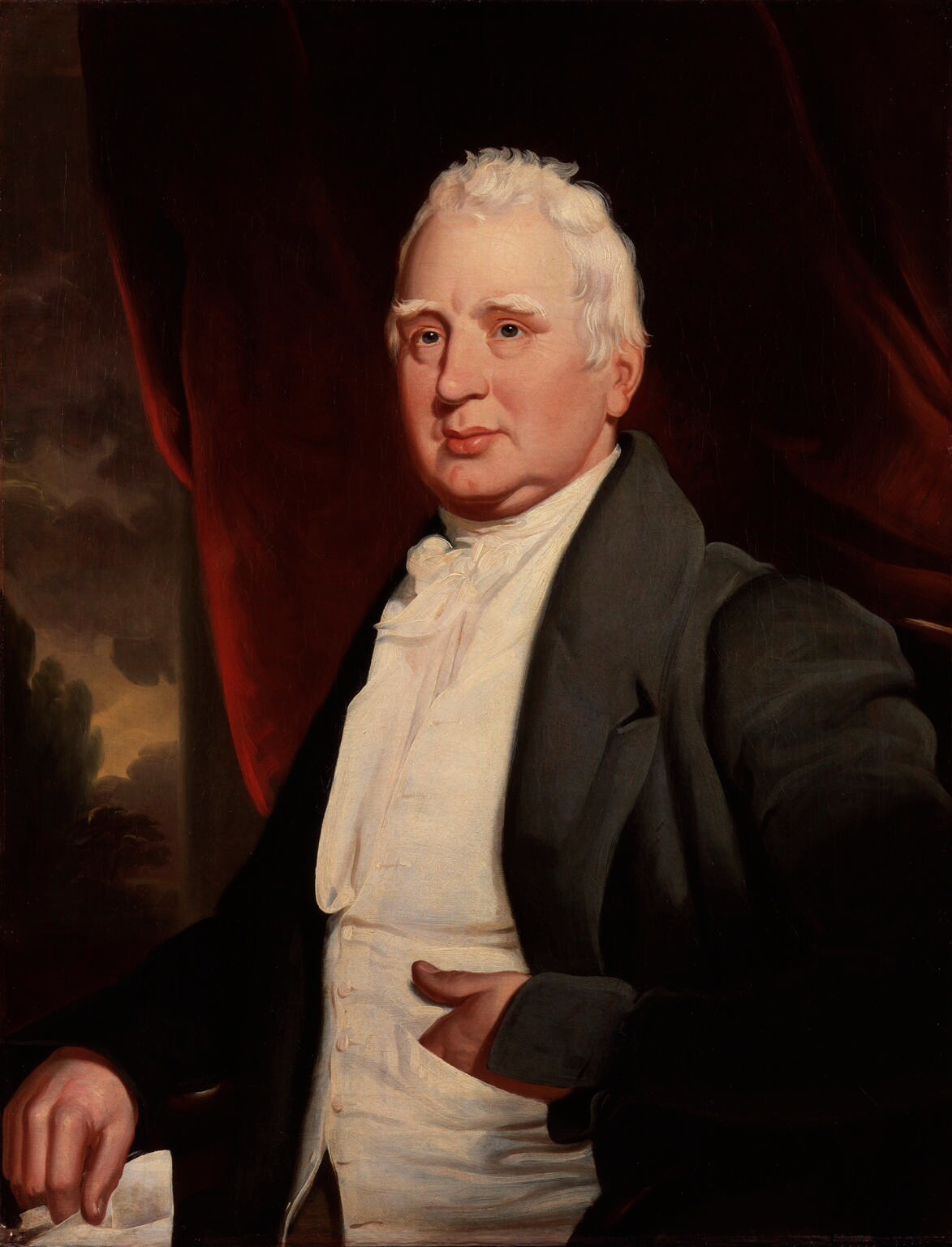
- William Cobbett, portrait in oils possibly by George Cooke, c. 1831 National Portrait Gallery (London)
- Born: 9 March 1763; Farnham, England
- Died: 18 June 1835 (aged 72); Normandy, Surrey, England
- Education: Gray's Inn
- Occupations: Pamphleteer, journalist, soldier
- Children: Anne Cobbett (1795–1877); William (1798–1878); John (1800–1877); James Paul (1803–1881); Eleanor (1805–1900); Susan (1807–1889)
- Writing career
- Notable work: Rural Rides

Member of Parliament for Oldham
- In office 1832–1835
- Succeeded by: John Frederick Lees

Personal details
- Party: Radical

William Cobbett (9 March 1763 – 18 June 1835) was an English pamphleteer, journalist, politician, and farmer born in Farnham, Surrey. He was one of an agrarian faction seeking to reform Parliament, abolish "rotten boroughs", restrain foreign activity, and raise wages, with the goal of easing poverty among farm labourers and small land holders. Cobbett backed lower taxes, saving, reversing commons enclosures and returning to the gold standard. He opposed borough-mongers, sinecurists, bureaucratic "tax-eaters" and stockbrokers. His radicalism furthered the Reform Act 1832 and gained him one of two newly created seats in Parliament for the borough of Oldham. His polemics range from political reform to religion, including Catholic emancipation. His best known book is Rural Rides (1830, in print). He argued against Malthusianism, saying economic betterment could support global population growth.

== Early life (1763–1791) ==
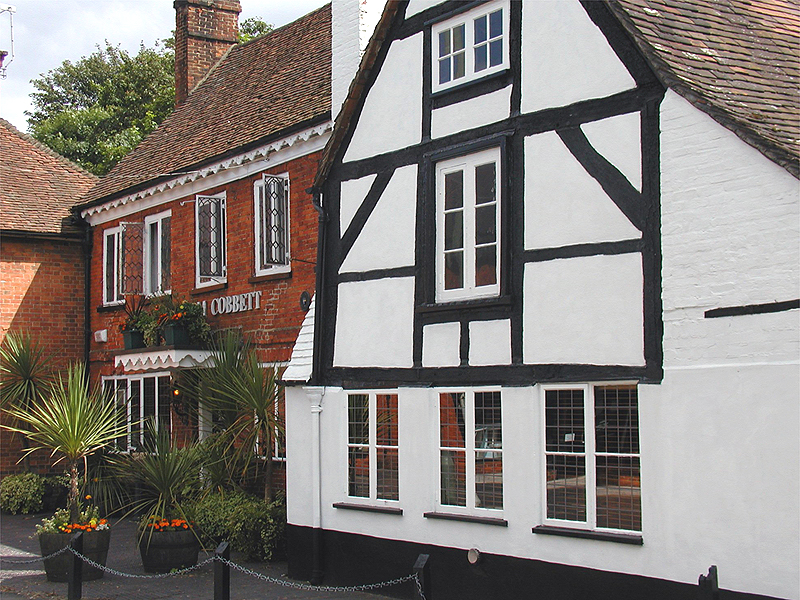
William Cobbett's birthplace

William Cobbett was born in Farnham, Surrey, on 9 March 1763, the third son of George Cobbett, a farmer and publican, and Anne Vincent. He was taught to read and write by his father and he started working from an early age. He later said: "I do not remember a time when I did not earn my living. My first occupation was driving small birds from the turnip seed, and the rooks from the peas." He worked as a farm labourer at Farnham Castle, and also worked briefly as a gardener in the King's garden at Kew. His rural upbringing gave him a lifelong love of gardening and hunting.

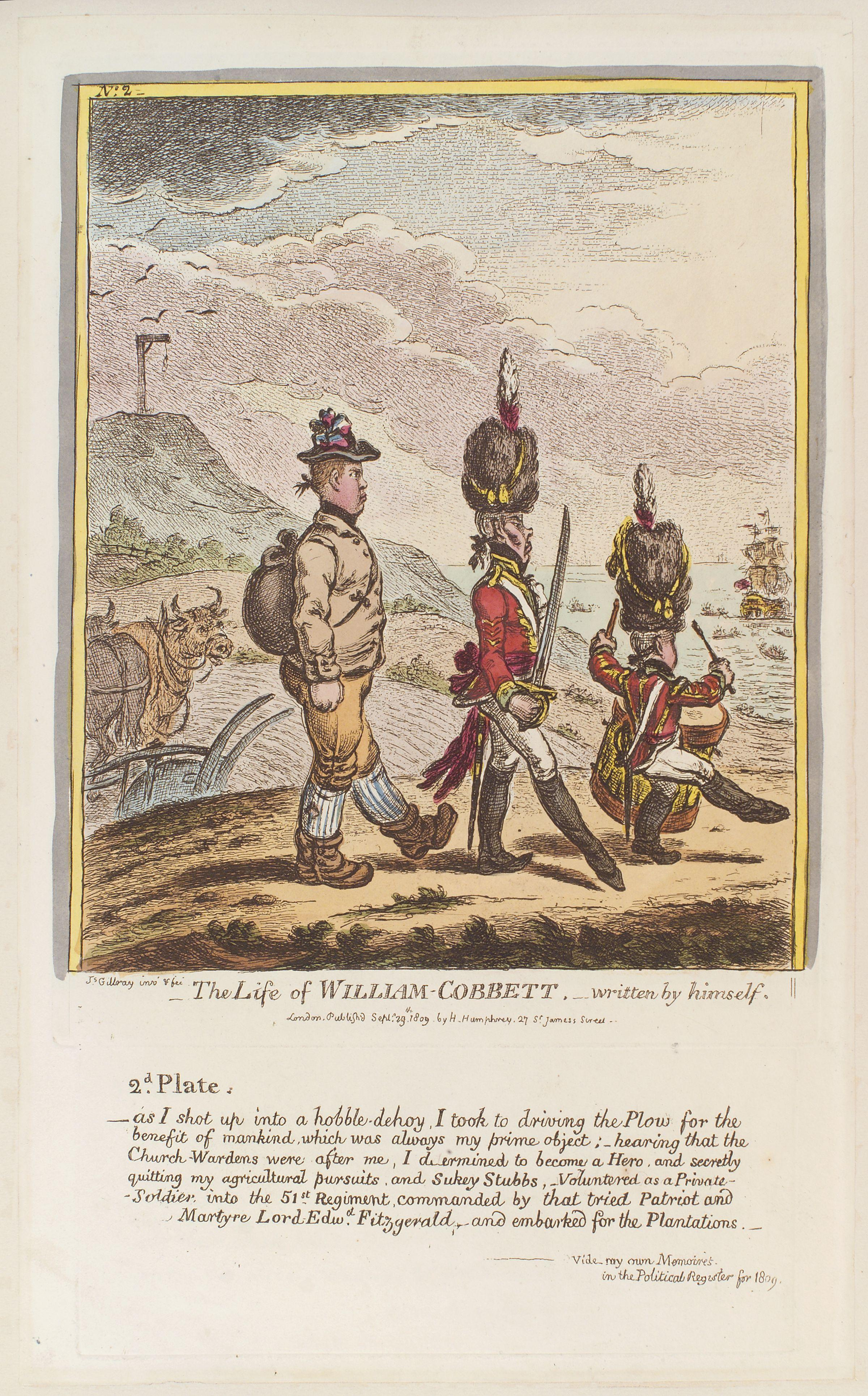
Cartoon of Cobbett enlisting in the army. From the Political Register of 1809. Artist James Gillray.

On 6 May 1783, he took a stage coach to London and spent eight or nine months as a clerk in the employ of a Mr. Holland at Gray's Inn. He joined the 54th (West Norfolk) Regiment of Foot in 1783. In his spare time, he improved his knowledge of English grammar. Between 1785 and 1791, Cobbett was stationed with his regiment in New Brunswick and sailed from Gravesend in Kent to Halifax, Nova Scotia. Cobbett was in Saint John, Fredericton and elsewhere in New Brunswick until September 1791, as he was promoted through the ranks to sergeant major, the most senior rank of non-commissioned officer.

Cobbett returned to Britain with his regiment, landing at Portsmouth on 3 November 1791. He obtained his discharge from the army on 19 December 1791. In Woolwich during February 1792, he married an American-born woman, Anne Reid (1774–1848), whom he had met while stationed at Fort Howe in Saint John. Their children were Anne (1795–1877), William (1798–1878), John (1800–1877), James Paul (1803–1881), Eleanor (1805–1900), and Susan (1807–1889). Their daughter Anne Cobbett was the author of several domestic books including The English Housekeeper: The Manual of Domestic Management.

== Refuge in France and the United States (1792–1800) ==
Cobbett had developed an animosity towards some officers, suspecting them of corruption, and gathered evidence on the matter while in New Brunswick. His charges against them were ignored. He wrote The Soldier's Friend in 1792, in protest against the low pay and harsh treatment of enlisted men in the British army. Sensing that he was about to be indicted in retribution, he fled from Britain to France in March 1792 to avoid imprisonment. Cobbett had intended to stay a year to learn the French language, but due to the French Revolution and French Revolutionary Wars in progress, he sailed for the United States in September 1792.

In the spring of 1793, he settled in Philadelphia, then the provisional capital of the United States. Cobbett initially prospered by teaching English to Frenchmen and translating texts from French to English. He later claimed that he had become a political writer by accident: during an English lesson one of his French students read aloud from a New York newspaper the addresses of welcome that the Democrats had sent to Joseph Priestley upon his arrival in America, along with Priestley's replies. His student applauded the anti-British sentiments that were expressed, and he quarrelled with Cobbett, who then resolved to "write and publish a pamphlet in defence of my country." His Observations on the Emigration of Dr. Priestley, which was published anonymously in 1794, was a violent attack on Priestley.

In 1795, Cobbett wrote A Bone to Gnaw for the Democrats, which attacked the pro-French Democratic Party. He replied to his critics with A Kick for a Bite, which was his first work to be published under the pseudonym "Peter Porcupine"; a reviewer had compared him to a porcupine, which pleased him. He took the side of the Federalists, who were led by Alexander Hamilton, because they were friendlier to Britain than were the pro-French Democrats led by Thomas Jefferson.

In January 1796, he began writing a monthly tract, The Censor. It was discontinued after eight releases, and replaced by Porcupine's Gazette, a daily newspaper which ran from March 1797 until the end of 1799. Talleyrand, at the time a French spy in America, tried but failed to bribe Cobbett to join the French cause.

Cobbett opened a bookstore in Philadelphia in July 1796. Its shop-window displayed a large portrait of George III and its interior featured a huge painting of "Lord Howe's Decisive Victory over the French". This provocative display attracted considerable attention. He reprinted and published much of the extreme loyalist literature then current, including George Chalmers's hostile biography of Thomas Paine, as well as his own version, reproducing Chalmer's work interspersed with contemptuous comments.

After Spain entered into an alliance with France against Britain, Cobbett expressed his anger through further pamphleteering that was highly critical of Spanish King Charles IV, in Porcupine's Gazette. The Spanish foreign minister in Philadelphia asked the United States government to prosecute Cobbett for libel of the Spanish king. Cobbett was arrested on 18 November 1797. He was tried in the State Court of Pennsylvania by Chief Justice Thomas McKean (who was also the Spanish minister's father-in-law). Despite McKean's criticism of Cobbett in his summing up, the grand jury threw out case against him by a one-vote majority.

In the Gazette, he serially denounced Benjamin Franklin Bache, publisher of the Jeffersonian paper, the Aurora. Cobbett suggested that the "stubborn sans culotte" should be treated "as we would a TURK, a JEW, a JACOBIN or a DOG". He directed the same invective against Bache's successor, William Duane and his growing circle of United Irish émigrés, describing them as men "animated by the same infamous principles, and actuated by that same thirst for blood and plunder, which had reduced France to a vast human slaughter-house". In May 1798, he began publishing accounts of a Conspiracy, Formed by the United Irishmen, With the Evident Intention of Aiding the Tyrants of France In Subverting the Government of the United States. Convening in Philadelphia's African Free School, and admitting, together with "all those who have suffered in the cause of freedom", free blacks, the Irish republicans had formed a society dedicated to the proposition (to which each member attested) that "a free form of government, and uncontrouled [sic] opinion on all subjects, [are] the common rights of all the human species". Against the backdrop of America's Quasi War with the French and of the Haitian Revolution (then still under the flag of the French Republic), for Cobbett, this was sufficient proof of an intention to organise slave revolts and "thus involve the whole country in rebellion and bloodshed".

Cobbett also campaigned against physician and abolitionist Benjamin Rush, whose advocacy of bleeding during the yellow fever epidemic may have caused many deaths. Rush won a libel suit against Cobbett. Cobbett never fully paid the $8,000 judgement, but instead fled to New York and during 1800 via Halifax, Nova Scotia, to Falmouth, Cornwall.

The British government was grateful to Cobbett for supporting Britain's interests in America: the Duke of Kent hailed him as "this great British patriot"; the British representative in America, Robert Liston, offered him a "great pecuniary reward" (which he turned down), and the Secretary at War, William Windham, said that Cobbett deserved a statue of gold for the services he had rendered to Britain in America.

== Return to England and The Political Register (1800–1810) ==
Cobbett's American writings were reprinted in Britain, with John Wright acting as his agent. In August 1800, Windham invited Cobbett to dinner with the Prime Minister, William Pitt, and contributors to the Anti-Jacobin, including George Canning. Pitt's government offered Cobbett the editorship of a government newspaper, but he chose to remain independent. His own paper, The Porcupine, bearing the motto "Fear God, Honour the King", started on 30 October 1800, but without success, and he sold his interest in it in 1801. Less than a month later, he started the Political Register, a newspaper that appeared almost every week from January 1802 until 1835, the year of Cobbett's death. Windham and French Laurence had suggested the idea of a weekly newspaper to Cobbett and Windham raised the money to fund it by private subscription.

When the British government signed a preliminary peace agreement with France in October 1801, Cobbett emerged as one of its foremost opponents, and in the pages of The Porcupine and in his Letters to Lord Hawkesbury, he denounced the agreement as humiliating to Britain and advantageous to France. When news of the ratification arrived on 10 October, Cobbett refused to illuminate the windows of his house in celebration and it was attacked by a mob, which smashed all the windows. When the Peace of Amiens was signed in March 1802, Cobbett again refused to illuminate his windows and the Royal Horse Guards had to protect his house from the mob.

War broke out again between Britain and France in May 1803 and Napoleon planned to invade England, assembling the Grande Armée at Boulogne. In June, The Morning Post appealed to all newspapers to print articles for "the purpose of arousing the people to the defence of the country". Cobbett immediately began a pamphlet, Important Considerations for the People of the Kingdom, warning the country of the consequences of a French invasion. Cobbett declined an offer of payment from the government and his pamphlet was published anonymously in July. The Prime Minister, Henry Addington, ordered copies to be sent to every parish in England and it had an immediate effect on public opinion.

Cobbett formed a close friendship with Windham, who became his patron and shared his anti-Jacobinism and his love of rural and athletic sports. The Evangelical movement was campaigning to reform the sports and recreations of the common people, intending to replace bull-baiting, boxing, singlestick, wrestling and racing with Sunday Schools and psalm singing. Cobbett in the Register criticised the Evangelicals' hostility to rural and athletic sports, "which string the nerves and strengthen the frame, which excite an emulation in deeds of hardihood and valour, and which imperceptibly instill honour, generosity, and a love of glory. Men thus formed are pupils unfit for the puritanical school; therefore it was, that the sect were incessantly labouring to eradicate, fibre by fibre, the last poor remains of English manners." Cobbett supported Windham in opposing attempts in the House of Commons to introduce bills against boxing and bull-baiting; he wrote to Windham that the bill "goes to the rearing of puritanism into a system."

Although initially staunchly anti-Jacobin, by 1804 Cobbett was questioning the policies of the Pitt government, especially the immense national debt and profligate use of sinecures, which Cobbett believed were ruining the country and increasing class antagonism.

Cobbett lived in Botley, Hampshire from 1805, farming and raising his family, initially at Botley House near Botley Mills, and then, from 1812, in a smaller house at Botley Hill.

By 1807, he was endorsing reformers such as Francis Burdett and John Cartwright.

Cobbett published the Complete Collection of State Trials between 1804 and 1812 and amassed accounts of parliamentary debates from 1066 onwards, but financial difficulties obliged him to sell his shares in it to T. C. Hansard in 1812. This unofficial record of parliamentary proceedings later became known officially as Hansard.

Cobbett intended to campaign for Parliament in Honiton in 1806, but was persuaded by Thomas Cochrane, 10th Earl of Dundonald to let him campaign in his stead. Both men campaigned together but failed, having refused to bribe voters by "buying" votes. This situation encouraged his opposition to rotten boroughs and belief in parliamentary reform.

== Prison (1810–1812) ==
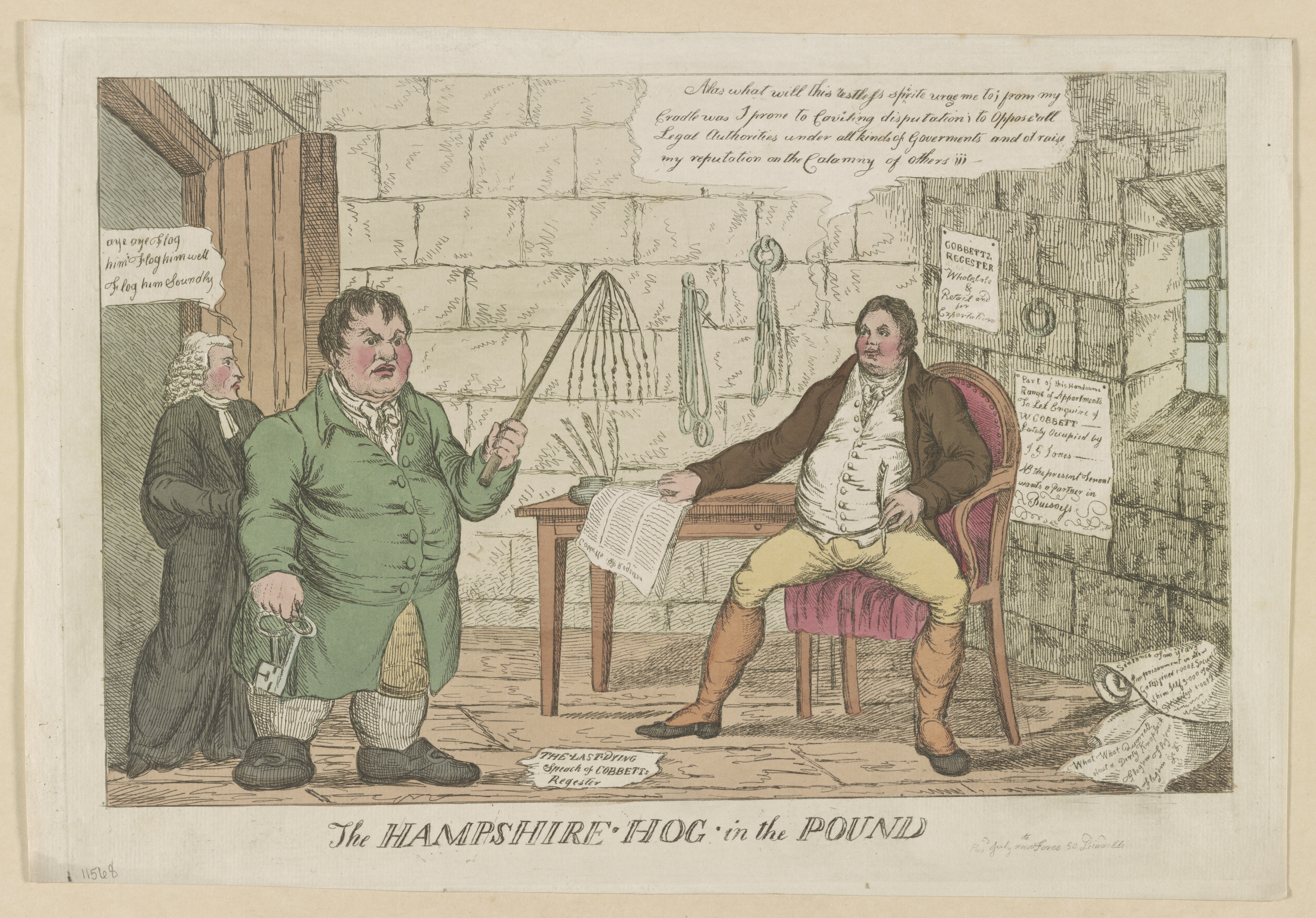
The 'Hampshire hog in the pound'

Cobbett was found guilty of seditious libel on 15 June 1810, after objecting in The Register to the flogging at Ely, Cambridgeshire of local militiamen by Hanoverians. During his two years' incarceration at Newgate Prison, he wrote the pamphlet Paper Against Gold, warning of the dangers of paper money, and many essays and letters. His daughter Anne lived with him in prison. On his release, a dinner in his honour in London was attended by 600 people and directed by Sir Francis Burdett, who like Cobbett was a strong advocate of parliamentary reform.

== "Two-Penny Trash" (1812–1817) ==
By 1815 the tax on newspapers had reached four pence a copy. As few people could afford to pay six or seven pence for a daily newspaper, the tax restricted the circulation of most journals to those with fairly high incomes. Cobbett could sell only about a thousand copies a week. Nonetheless, he began criticising William Wilberforce for endorsing the Corn Laws, for his personal wealth and opposition to bull and bear-baiting, and particularly for his approval of "the fat and lazy and laughing and singing negroes".

In 1816 Cobbett began publishing the Political Register as a pamphlet. It now sold for only two pence and soon had a circulation of 40,000. Critics termed it "two-penny trash", a phrase Cobbett adopted. It became the main newspaper read by the working class. Radical campaigner Samuel Bamford later wrote:

At this time the writings of William Cobbett suddenly became of great authority; they were read on nearly every cottage hearth in the manufacturing districts of South Lancashire, in those of Leicester, Derby, and Nottingham; also in many of the Scottish manufacturing towns. Their influence was speedily visible. He directed his readers to the true cause of their sufferings—misgovernment; and to its proper corrective—parliamentary reform.

This made Cobbett a dangerous man. In 1817, he became aware that the government was planning to arrest him for sedition. With the government intending to suspend habeas corpus, and fearing arrest for his arguably seditious writings, Cobbett again fled to the United States. On Wednesday 27 March 1817, he embarked at Liverpool for New York on the ship Importer, with D. Ogden as master, accompanied by his two eldest sons, William and John.

== Refuge in the United States (1817–1819) ==
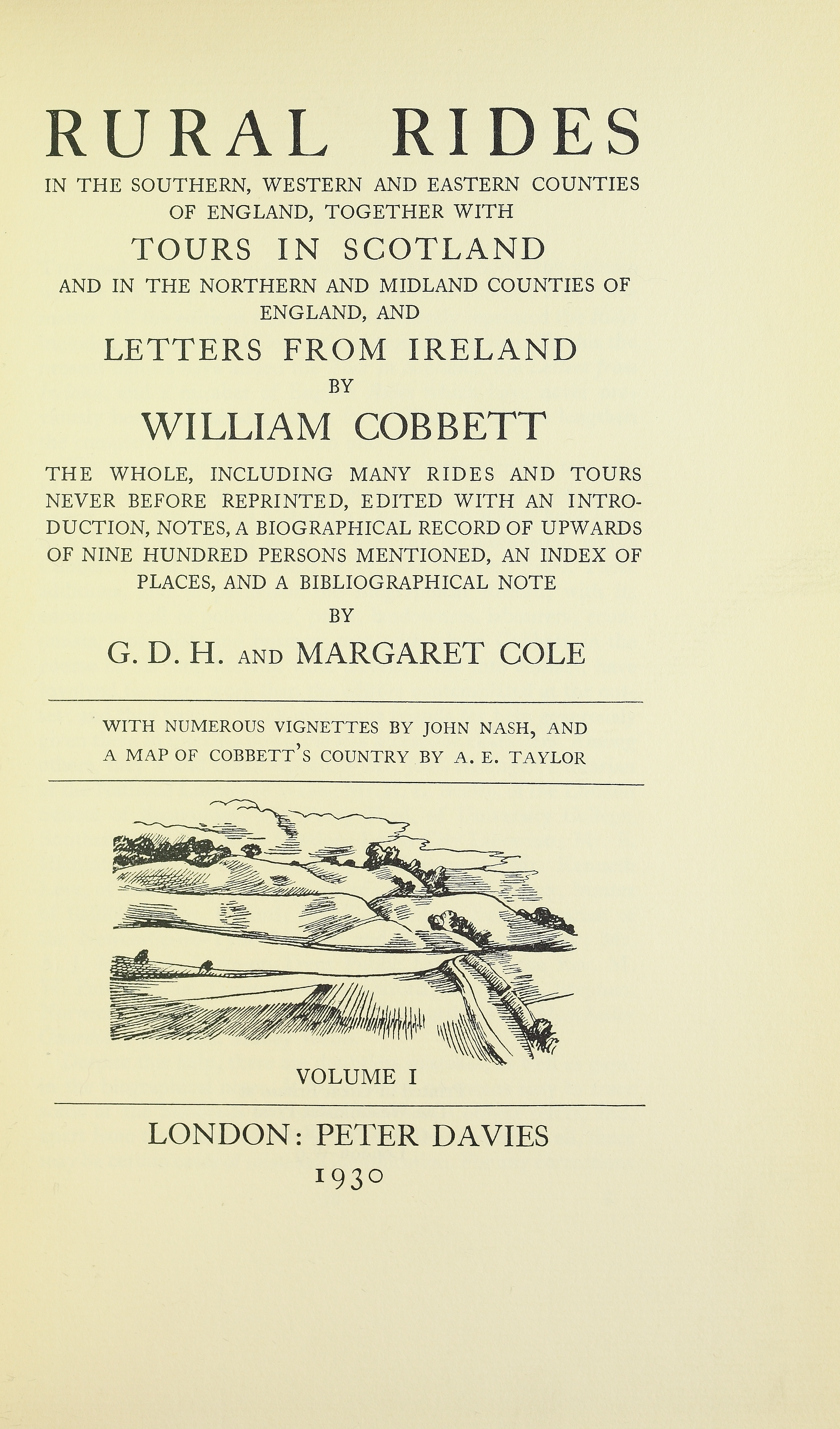
Rural rides in the southern, western and eastern counties of England, 1930.

Cobbett lived for two years on a farm on Long Island, where he wrote Grammar of the English Language. With help from William Benbow, a friend in London, he continued to issue the Political Register. He also wrote The American Gardener (1821), one of the earliest horticultural books published in the United States.

Cobbett observed alcohol-drinking habits in the United States. He stated in 1819, "Americans preserve their gravity and quietness and good-humour even in their drink." He believed it would be "far better for them to be as noisy and quarrelsome as the English drunkards; for then the odiousness of the vice would be more visible, and the vice itself might become less frequent."

A plan to return to England with the remains of the British-American radical pamphleteer and revolutionary Thomas Paine (who had died in 1809) resulted in the ultimate loss of the remains. The plan was to disinter Paine's remains from his New Rochelle, New York farm for a heroic reburial on his native soil, but the bones were still among Cobbett's effects when he died 16 years later. There is no confirmed story of what happened to them after that, although claims to parts of the body have been made down the years, including his skull and right hand.

Cobbett arrived back in Britain at Liverpool by ship in November 1819.

== Later life (1819–1835) ==
Cobbett's arrival came soon after the Peterloo Massacre. He joined with other radicals in attacks on the government and was charged with libel three times in the next couple of years.

Cobbett published on behalf of Caroline of Brunswick in her fight against the Pains and Penalties Bill 1820. His daughter Anne believed that he would have had fewer legal difficulties if he had stopped supporting Queen Caroline, but noted that they gained much needed source of income from supporting her. The family all expected notable rewards following the outcome of the trial being seen to be in Caroline's favour, however her death soon after meant that this did not happen to the expected degree.

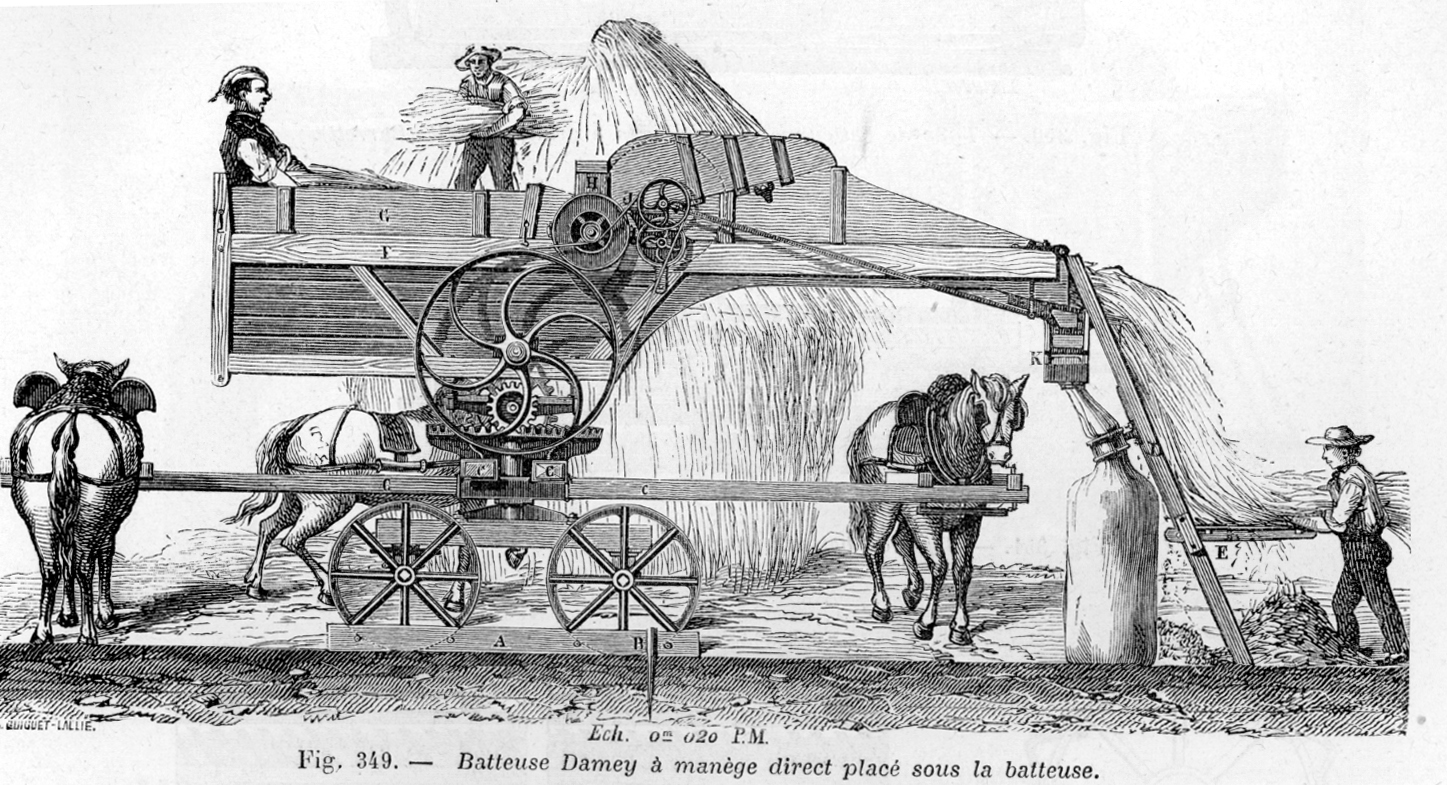
The introduction of horse-powered threshing machines to farms was one of the principal causes of the Swing Riots in 1830.

In 1820, he campaigned for Parliament in Coventry, but finished last in the poll. That year he also founded a plant nursery at Kensington, where he grew many North American trees, such as the black locust (Robinia pseudoacacia), and with his son, a variety of maize he called "Cobbett's corn". This was a dwarf strain found in a French cottage garden, which turned out to grow well in England's shorter summer. To help sell the strain, he issued a book entitled A Treatise on Cobbett's Corn (1828). Meanwhile, he also wrote his popular Cottage Economy (1822), which taught cottagers some skills necessary for self-sufficiency, such as bread-making, beer-brewing and livestock farming.

=== Advocacy for the English poor and working-class ===
Not content to let information be brought to him for his newspaper, Cobbett did his own journalistic work – especially on his repeated theme of the plight of rural Englishmen. He began riding about the country observing events in towns and villages. Rural Rides, a work for which Cobbett is still known, appeared first in serial form in the Political Register from 1822 to 1826, and then in book form in 1830. While writing it, Cobbett also produced The Woodlands (1825), a book on silviculture.

In the first supplement to the Political Register, Cobbett had defended the slave trade as necessary to British commerce. After the Slave Trade Act 1807 prohibited slave trade, Cobbett wrote in the Register that "there is not a reflecting man in the kingdom that cares one straw about it." In the Register for 30 August 1823, Cobbett published his Letter to William Wilberforce, an answer to Wilberforce's Appeal to the Religion, Justice and Humanity of the Inhabitants of the British Empire in Behalf of the Negro Slaves in the West Indies. Here, he attacked Wilberforce's support for the Combination Act, which prohibited trade unions among British workers, and said: "Never have you done one single act, in favour of those labourers, but many and many an act you have done against them." The Letter to Wilberforce was widely distributed in working class areas and gave an impetus to the Combination Act's repeal in 1824.

Cobbett contrasted the Evangelical reformers' campaign for the abolition of black slavery with their support for the "factory slavery" of British workers. He argued that black slaves were better fed, clothed and housed than British workers, and were better treated by their masters. He wrote: "Will not the care, will not the anxiety of a really humane Englishman be directed towards the Whites, instead of towards the Blacks, until, at any rate, the situation of the former be made to be as good as that of the latter?" In 1833, Cobbett voted for the abolition of slavery but in the Register he was still contrasting Parliament's concern for black slaves with their indifference to the sufferings of British "factory slaves".

=== Catholic emancipation ===
Although not a Catholic, Cobbett at this time also advocated the cause of Catholic Emancipation. Between 1824 and 1826, he published his History of the Protestant Reformation, a broadside against the traditional Protestant historical narrative of the reformation, stressing the lengthy and often bloody persecutions of Catholics in Britain and Ireland. Catholics were still forbidden at that time to enter certain professions or become members of Parliament. Although the law was no longer enforced, it was officially still a crime to attend Mass or build a Catholic church. Although Wilberforce also worked and spoke against discrimination against Catholics, Cobbett resumed his strident opposition to the noted reformer, particularly after Wilberforce in 1823 published his Appeal in Behalf of the Negro Slaves in the West Indies. Wilberforce, long suffering from ill health, retired the next year.

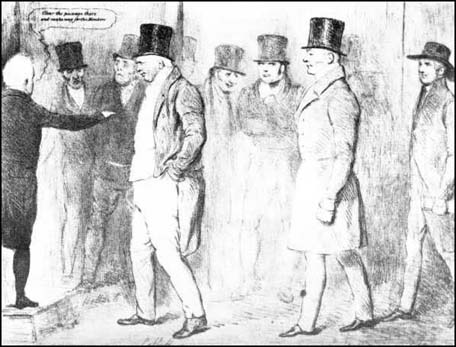
William Cobbett (left foreground), John Gully (middle) and Joseph Pease (right) (the first Quaker elected to Parliament) arriving at Westminster, during March 1833. Sketch by John Doyle.

In 1829, Cobbett published Advice To Young Men, in which he criticised An Essay on the Principle of Population by the Reverend Thomas Robert Malthus. That year he also published The English Gardener, which he later updated and expanded. This book has been compared favourably with other contemporary garden tomes, such as John Claudius Loudon's Encyclopædia of Gardening.

Cobbett continued to publish controversial content in his Weekly Political Register and was charged in July 1831 with seditious libel for a pamphlet entitled Rural War, endorsing the Captain Swing Riots, in which rioters were smashing farm machinery and burning haystacks. Cobbett successfully conducted his own defence.

=== Member of Parliament ===
Cobbett still sought to be elected to the House of Commons. He was defeated in Preston in 1826 and in Manchester in 1832, but after the passage of the Reform Act 1832, Cobbett won the seat of Oldham.

In Parliament, Cobbett concentrated his energies on attacking corruption in government and the 1834 Poor Law. He believed that the poor had a right to a share in the community's wealth and that the Old Poor Law was the last remaining right that English workers possessed, and which set them apart from other countries which had no such provision. Because the New Poor Law deprived the people of this right to relief, Cobbett believed that the social contract was broken and that therefore the duty of allegiance was dissolved. A week before his death, he wrote to a friend: "[B]efore the passing of the Poor-Law Bill, I wished to avoid [a] convulsive termination. I now do not wish it to be avoided."

During later life, Thomas Macaulay, a fellow MP, remarked that Cobbett's faculties were impaired by age. From 1831 until his death, Cobbett managed a farm named Ash in the village of Normandy, Surrey, a few miles from his birthplace at Farnham. Cobbett died there after a brief illness in June 1835 and was buried in the churchyard of St Andrew's Church, Farnham.

== Parliamentary career ==
During his lifetime Cobbett campaigned for parliament five times, of which four attempts were unsuccessful:

- 1806 Honiton
- 1820 Coventry
- 1826 Preston
- 1832 Manchester

In 1832 he was elected as a member for Oldham.

== Legacy ==
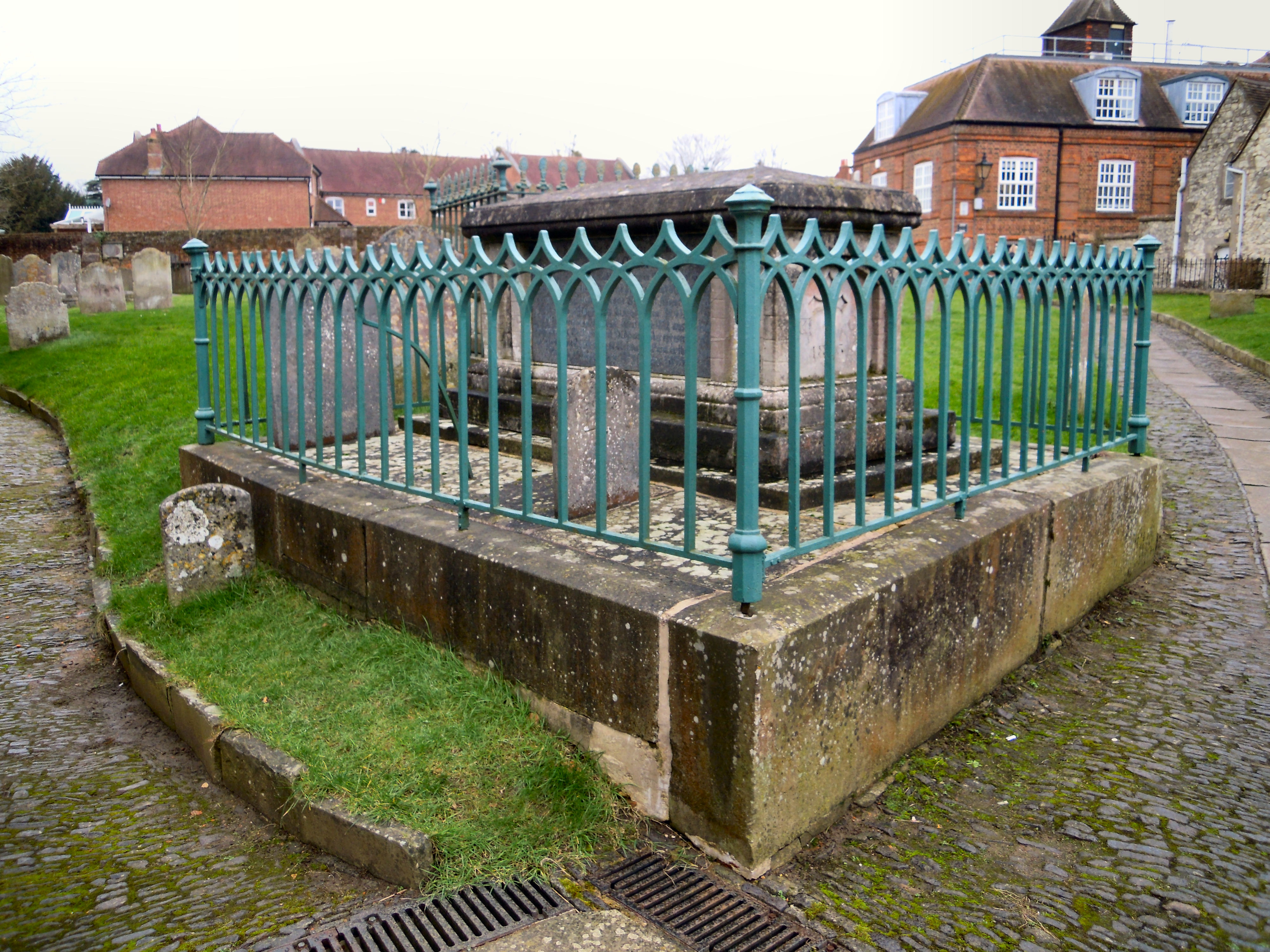
The tomb of William Cobbett in the churchyard of St Andrew's church in Farnham.

Cobbett is considered to have begun as an inherently conservative journalist. He was angered by the corrupt British political establishment, and became increasingly radical and sympathetic to antigovernment and democratic ideals. He provided a panegyric extolling rural England during the Industrial Revolution, which he was not in sympathy with. Cobbett wished England would return to the rural England of the 1760s, in which he had been born.

Unlike fellow radical Thomas Paine, Cobbett was not an internationalist cosmopolitan and did not endorse a republican Britain. He boasted that he was not a "citizen of world.... It is quite enough for me to think about what is best for England, Scotland and Ireland." Possessing a national identity, he often criticised rival countries and warned them that they should not "swagger about and be saucy to England." He said his identification with the Church of England was due in part because it "bears the name of my country." Among historical biographers, Ian Dyck claimed that Cobbett endorsed "the eighteenth-century Country Party platform"; Edward Tangye Lean described him as "an archaic English Tory". G. K. Chesterton argued that Cobbett "really cared about the English people. He was conservative because he cared for their past, and liberal because he cared for their future."

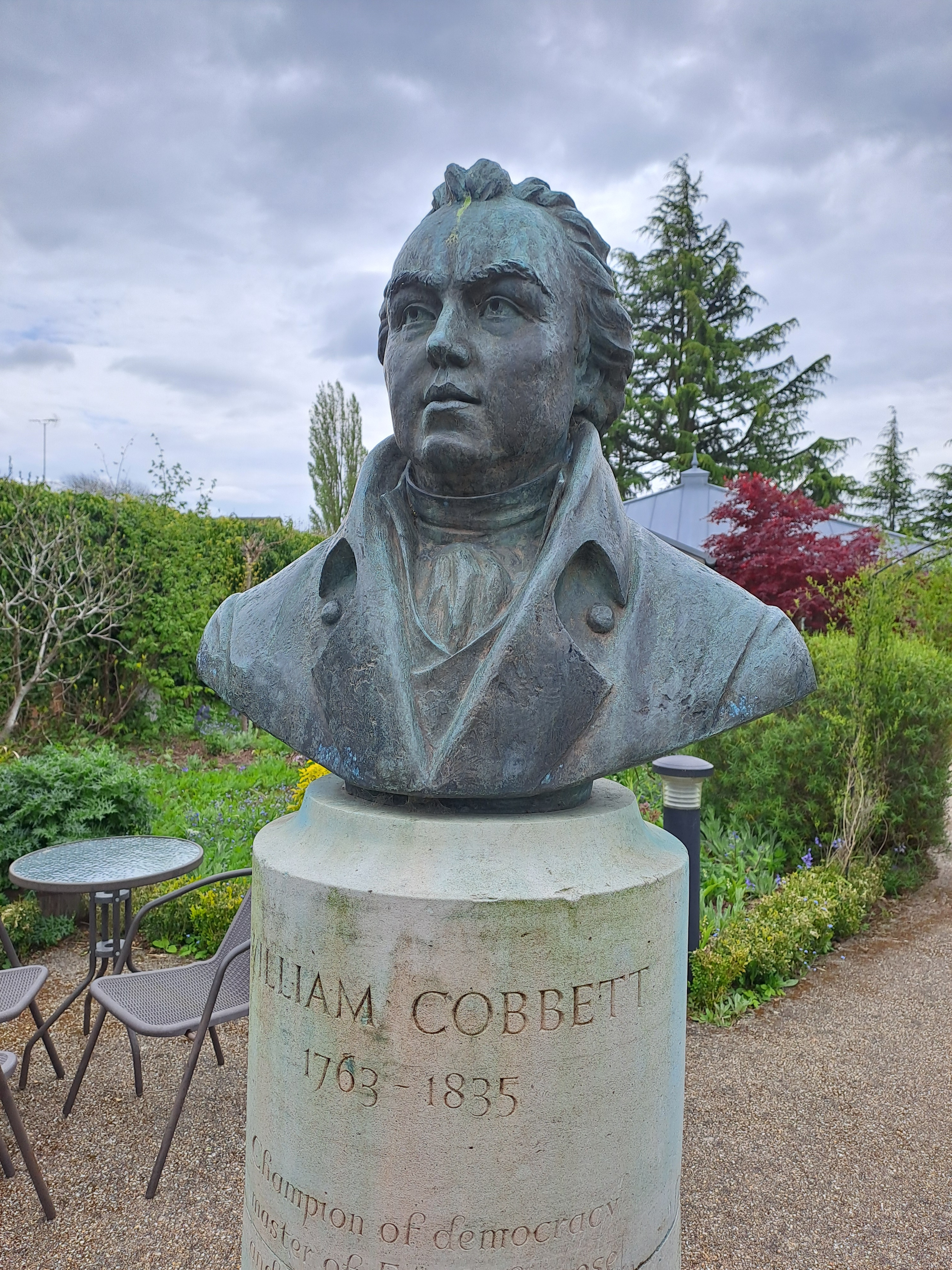
Bust of William Cobbett, Farnham Museum garden

His writing style was parodied by Horace and James Smith in their collection, Rejected Addresses (1812).

Cobbett has been praised by thinkers of various political persuasions, such as Matthew Arnold, Karl Marx, G. K. Chesterton, A. J. P. Taylor, Raymond Williams, E. P. Thompson and Michael Foot.

A story by Cobbett issued in 1807 popularized the term "red herring", to mean a distraction from an important issue.

Cobbett's sons were trained as barristers and founded a partnership in Manchester named Cobbetts in his honour. The firm dissolved in 2013. His second son John Morgan Cobbett (1800–1877) followed him into politics and like his father became MP for Oldham.

Cobbett's birthplace, a public house in Farnham once named The Jolly Farmer, has been renamed The William Cobbett. The Brooklyn-based history band Piñataland performed a song about William Cobbett's quest to rebury Thomas Paine entitled "An American Man". An equestrian statue of Cobbett was being planned for a site in Farnham in 2009, which already has the William Cobbett Primary School named in his honour. There is a modern block of flats named William Cobbett House on Scarsdale Place, close to his former garden nursery in Kensington.

After Cobbett's death, Benjamin Tilly, who had served Cobbett as companion, secretary and factotum, initiated the Cobbett Club. Members sent petitions to Parliament demanding radical reform and produced radical pamphlets and leaflets to keep Cobbett's politics alive. Some of these are still available in libraries. The William Cobbett Society, based in Farnham, produces a yearly edition of 'Cobbett's New Register', and celebrates Cobbett's life, works and spirit in various activities, including an annual Rural Ride and lecture.

== Works ==
- A Bone to Gnaw for the Democrats, Philadelphia, 1795, as "Peter Porcupine", reprinted at London in 1797
- Cobbett's Parliamentary History of England from the Norman conquest in 1066 to the Year 1803, from Which Last-Mentioned Epoch It Is Continued Downwards in the Work Entitled "Cobbett's Parliamentary Debates", vol. I–XXXV, London: T.C. Hansard, 1806–1820
- A Complete Collection of State Trials and Proceedings for High Treason and Other Crimes and Misdemeanors from the Earliest Period to the Year 1783, vol. I, II, III, IV, V, VI, VII, VIII, IX, X, XI, XII, XIII, XIV, XV, XVI, XVII, XVIII, XIX, XX, & XXI, London: T.C. Hansard, 1816, with Thomas Bayly Howell
- A Grammar of the English Language, New York, 1818
- A Year's Residence in the United States of America London. 1818-19 [1828]
- Cottage Economy, C. Clement, 1822
- Rural Rides, 1822
- The Woodlands, 1825
- The Housekeeper's Magazine and Family Economist, London: Knight & Lacey, 1826
- Elements of the Roman History in English and French from the Foundation of Rome to the Battle of Actium, Selected from the Best Authors, Ancient and Modern, with a Series of Questions at the End of Each Chapter for the Use of Schools and Young Persons in General, London: Mills, Jowett, & Mills, 1828, with Juan Enrique Sievrac
- The Poor Man's Friend, or, Essays on the Rights and Duties of the Poor (PDF), 1829, archived from the original (PDF) on 19 January 2012
- Emigrant's Guide: In Ten Letters, Addressed to the Tax-Payers of England, London 1829
- Rural Rides in the Counties, Cobbett, 1830
- Cobbett's Tour in Scotland and in the four Northern Vounties in England, Cobbett, 1833
- The Life of Andrew Jackson, President of the United States, New York: Harper & Bros, 1834
- Advice to Young Men, and (Incidentally) to Young Women, in the Middle and Higher Ranks of Life
- A History of the Protestant Reformation in England and Ireland
- List of Abbeys, Priories, Nunneries, Hospitals, and Other Religious Foundations in England and Wales and in Ireland Confiscated, Seized on, or Alienated by the Protestant "Reformation" Sovereigns and Parliaments, T. Richardson and son, 1868
- Cobbett In Ireland: A Warning to England, London: Lawrence and Wishart, 1984

== See also ==
- Tilford, with an ancient oak tree described by Cobbett

== Notes ==
Parliament of the United Kingdom
| New constituency | Member of Parliament for Oldham; 1832–1835; With: John Fielden | Succeeded by John Fielden and John Frederick Lees |
