= Dulcie Foo Fat =

British-born Canadian landscape painter (born 1946)

- Born: Dulcie Dixon; 1946 (age 79–80); London, England
- Education: University of Reading; University of Calgary
- Known for: Painter
- Spouse: France Foo Fat

Dulcie Foo Fat (born 1946) is a British-born Canadian landscape painter, based in Calgary, Alberta.

Foo Fat is known for her large representational paintings made from her photographs of the microscopic landscape of the forest floor, particularly in the Rocky Mountains, or of the bottoms of tidal pools, that reconcile abstract expressionism and magic realism. They suggest, without stating it, the fragility of the environment.

== Life ==
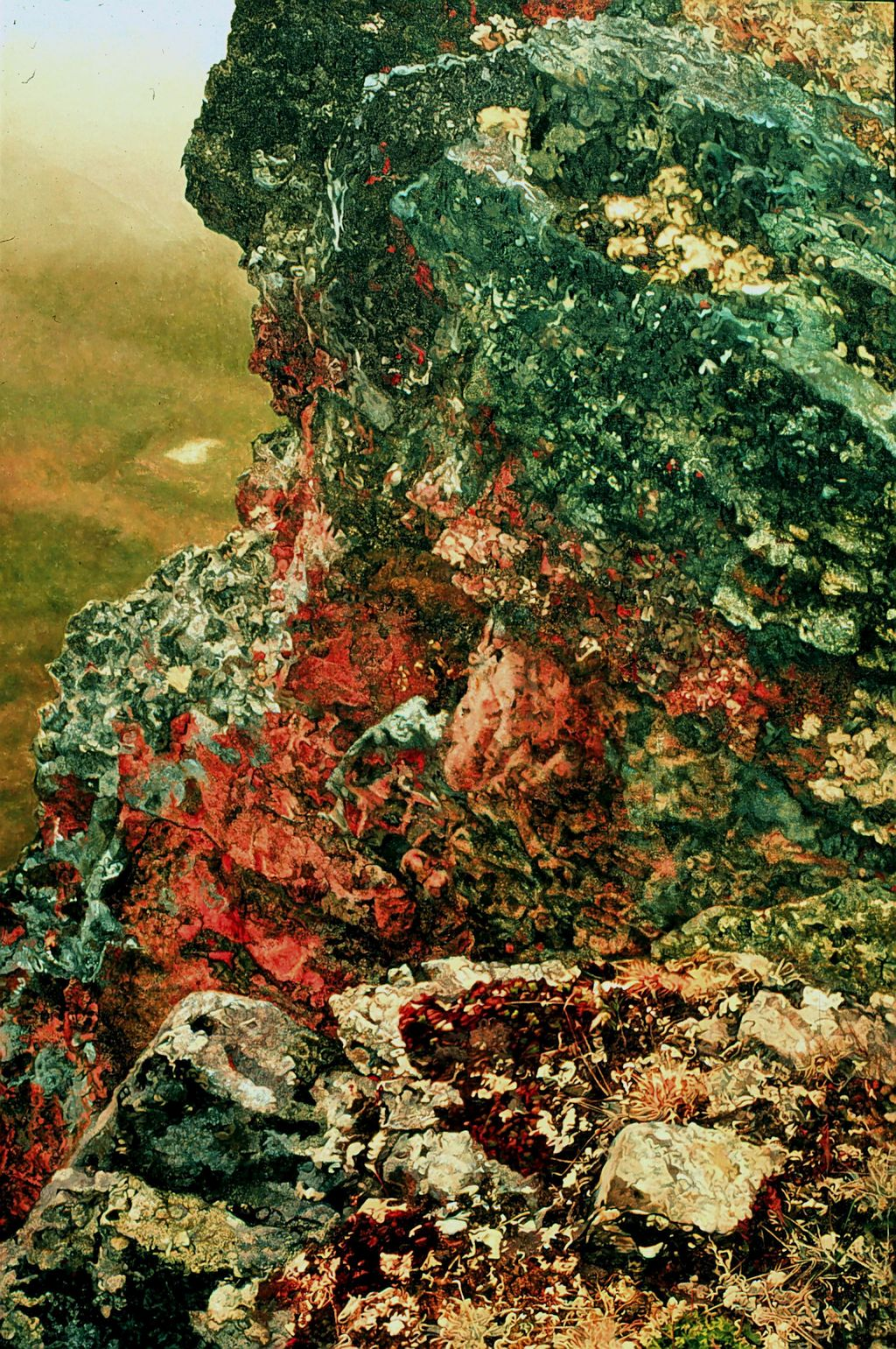
Engesiak no.1 (1991). Oil on canvas. 63" X 42".

Born Dulcie Dixon in London, England, Foo Fat earned a teaching certificate and bachelor's degree from University of Reading in 1969. She met and married France Foo Fat in London, and the couple immigrated to Canada in 1970. Four years later, Foo Fat earned a Master of Arts degree from the University of Calgary.

Her husband France died in 2018. The couple had four daughters.

== Career ==
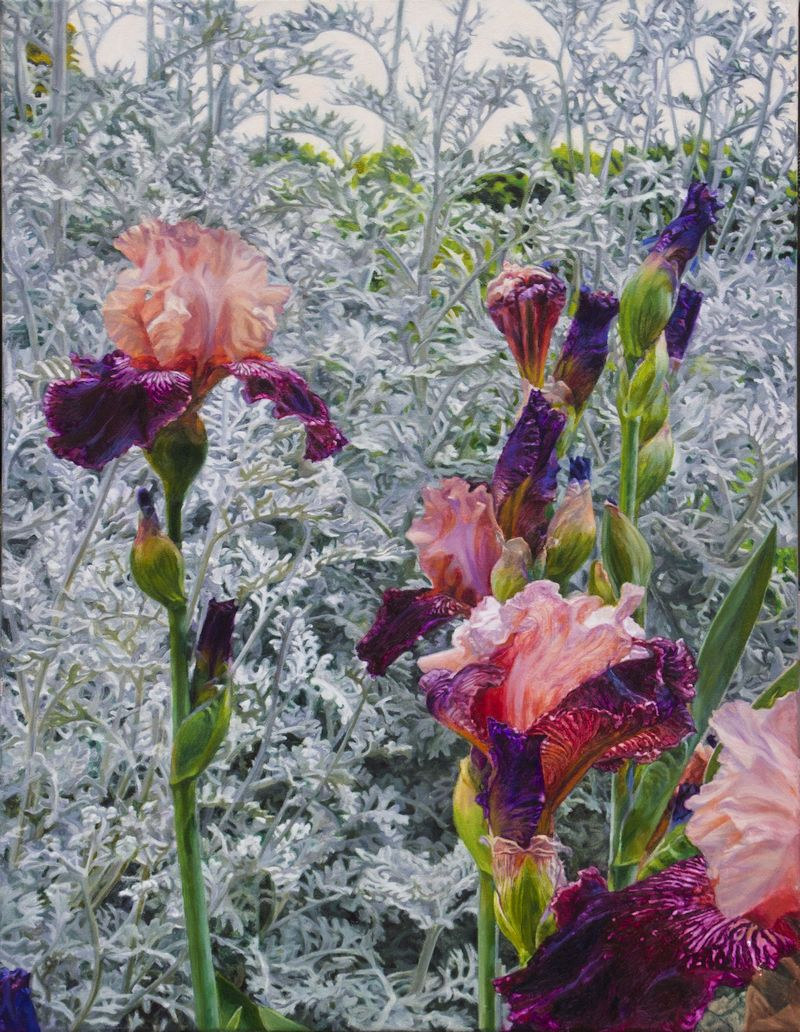
Irises in the Generalife Gardens (2017). Oil on canvas. 30” X 22”.

Foo Fat has earned recognition for her photorealistic paintings. She is primarily known for her close-up paintings of landscapes, including forest floors and tidal pools. Her style has been called "abstract realism" because the scale of her paintings lends an abstract quality to her work.

In 1987, Monique Westra curated a survey exhibition for the Whyte Museum in Banff, Dance with Minutiae: the Paintings of Dulcie Foo Fat. The show, Foo Fat's first solo exhibition in a public gallery, was favourably reviewed.

The Glenbow Museum, Calgary; McMichael Canadian Art Collection, Kleinburg; the Mendel Art Gallery, Saskatoon; University of Lethbridge Art Gallery; the University of Calgary; the Alberta Foundation for the Arts; and the Whyte Museum in Banff are among public institutions holding examples of Foo Fat's work.
