= Dolce (Plzeň-South District) =

- Municipality
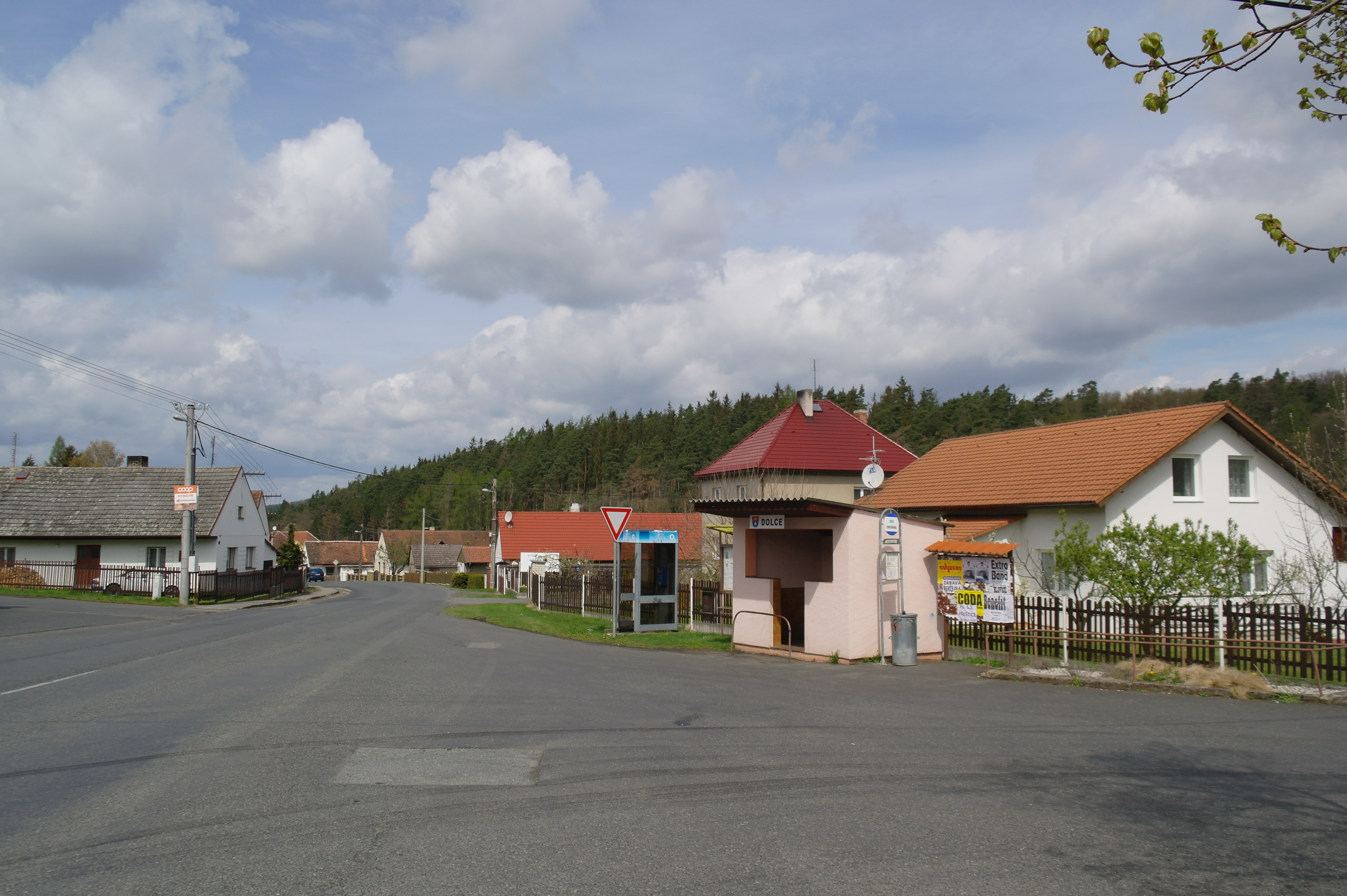
- Centre of Dolce

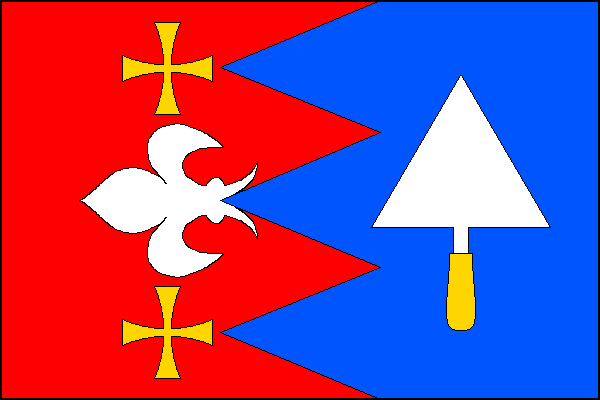
- Flag Coat of arms

- Location in the Czech Republic
- Coordinates: 49°33′11″N 13°23′36″E
- Country: Czech Republic
- Region: Plzeň
- District: Plzeň-South
- First mentioned: 1379

Area
  - Total: 5.99 km^{2} (2.31 sq mi)
- Elevation: 452 m (1,483 ft)

Population (2026-01-01)
  - Total: 300
  - Density: 50/km^{2} (130/sq mi)
- Time zone: UTC+1 (CET)
  - Summer (DST): UTC+2 (CEST)
- Postal code: 334 01
- Website: www.obec-dolce.cz

Dolce is a municipality and village in Plzeň-South District in the Plzeň Region of the Czech Republic. It has about 300 inhabitants.

Dolce lies approximately 22 kilometres (14 mi) south of Plzeň and 95 km (59 mi) south-west of Prague.

== Demographics ==
Historical population
Year	Pop.	±%
1869	365	—
1880	361	−1.1%
1890	378	+4.7%
1900	399	+5.6%
1910	373	−6.5%
1921	403	+8.0%
1930	442	+9.7%
1950	355	−19.7%
1961	380	+7.0%
1970	346	−8.9%
1980	279	−19.4%
1991	262	−6.1%
2001	268	+2.3%
2011	280	+4.5%
2021	287	+2.5%
Source: Censuses
