= Political Register =

Weekly London-based newspaper

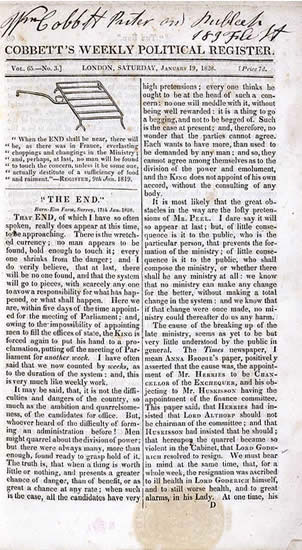
Title page of the January 19, 1828 edition of Political Register

The Cobbett's Weekly Political Register, commonly known as the Political Register, was a weekly London-based newspaper founded by William Cobbett in 1802. It published continuously until Cobbett's death in 1836.

== History ==
Originally propounding Tory views, and costing a shilling, Cobbett changed his editorial line to embrace radicalism, such as advocating widening the suffrage. It had a large circulation for the time of 6,000 copies.

The government was alarmed by its radicalism and tried to prevent mass circulation by adding stamp duty on all newspapers, putting them out of reach of all but the wealthiest. From November 1816, Cobbett also published the Register in a cheap 2d. pamphlet, which kept political comment but evaded stamp duty by excising news. The price of the paper gave it the nickname "Two-Penny Trash;" nevertheless, it soon gained a circulation of 40,000.

Cobbett began publishing Parliamentary Debates as a supplement to his Political Register in 1802. At the time it was illegal to report the proceeding of Parliament, only its ultimate decisions. He eventually extended his reportage back in time with the Parliamentary History. Cobbett's reports were printed by Thomas Curson Hansard from 1809. In 1812, with his business suffering, Cobbett sold the Debates section to Hansard.

Historical copies of Cobbett's Weekly Political Register, dating back to 1802, are available to search and view in digitised form at The British Newspaper Archive.
