= Edward John Cobbett =

English painter (1815–1899)

Edward John Cobbett R.B.A.
- Born: 1815; Marylebone, London, England
- Died: 11 October 1899, age 84; Winchmore Hill, North London
- Known for: Landscape painting, flower painting, rustic scenes, child portraiture

Edward John Cobbett (1815–1899) was an English watercolour and oil painter.

== Background ==
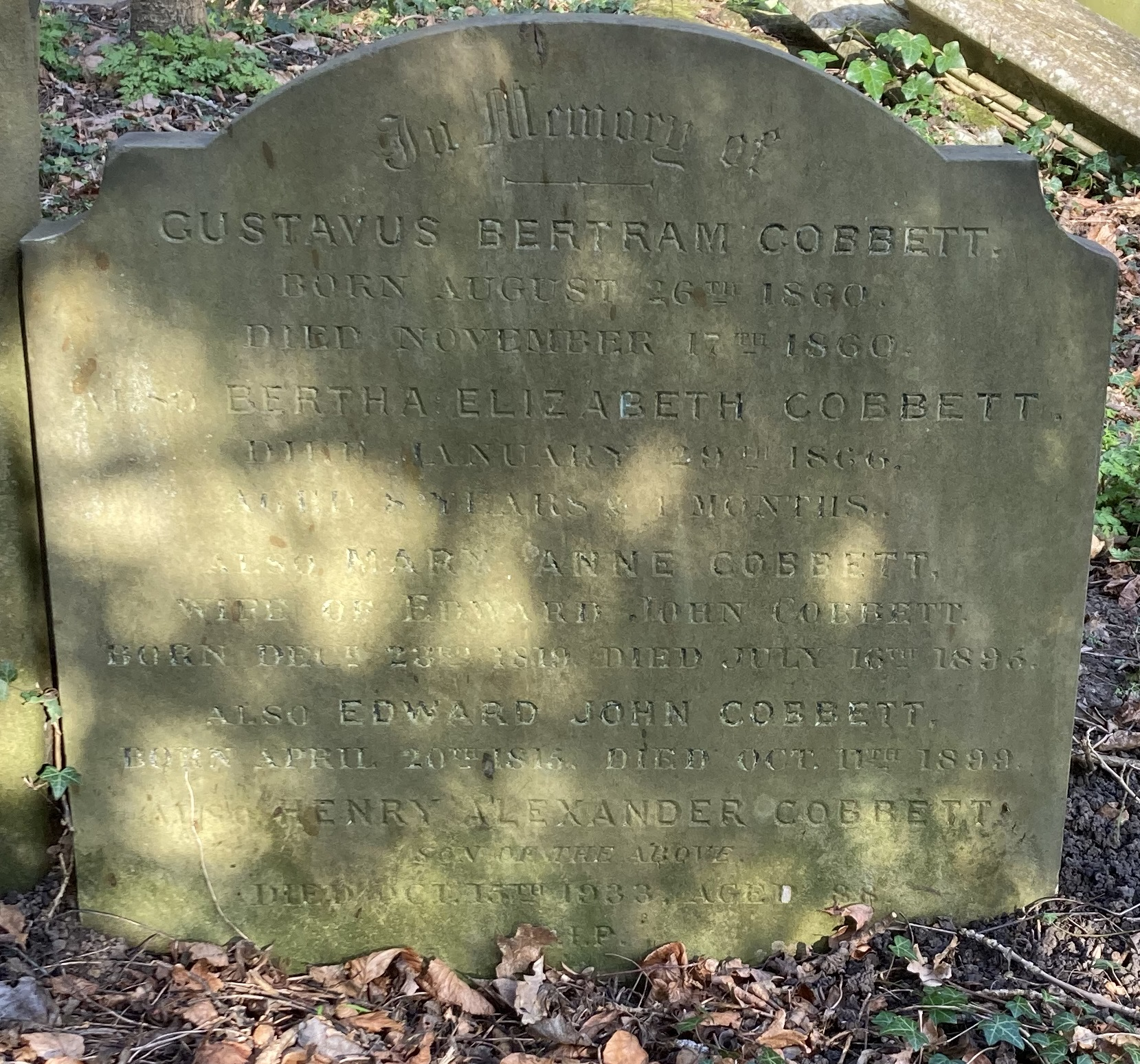
Grave of Edward John Cobbett in Highgate Cemetery

Cobbett was born in Marylebone, London, in 1815. (Note: England Census 1871, RG10/220, page 43, schedule 67, St Pancras, London) He was a member of the Savage Club in his younger days, "when Bohemianism and exclusiveness were the purport of all its rules". He had a "considerable circle of artistic friends ... he was to the last generation of artistic Bohemians well known". In 1871 and 1881 he was living at 20 Oakley Square, St Pancras, London, with his wife Mary Anne née Haynes and four daughters including Theodosia Mary Ann Cobbett (born 1841), (Note: Births Dec 1841 Cobbett Theodosia Mary Ann St Pancras I 300) Phoebe Maria Cobbett (born 1849), (Note: Births Mar 1849 Cobbett Phoebe Maria Kensington III 375) Edith Haynes Cobbett (born 1856), (Note: Births Mar 1856 Cobbett Edith Haynes St. Pancras 1b 148) and Gertrude Winifred Cobbett (born 1862). (Note: Births Dec 1862 Cobbett Gertrude Winifred Pancras 1b 96) He described himself as an "artist, figure and landscape". (Note: England Census 1881, RG11/197 page 26, St Pancras)

His daughter Gertrude Winifred married Gerald Aubrey Goodman in 1885.

Cobbet moved to Surrey, retired in 1885, and died aged 84 at Avondale, Winchmore Hill, North London on 11 October 1899. He is buried in a family grave on the western side of Highgate Cemetery.

== Training and career ==
Cobbett was originally a wood carver, and at the time of his death in 1899, some of his carving could still be seen in the choir of York Minster. However when he was twenty years old he became a painter.

Cobbet was a pupil of Joseph William Allen. "He quickly made a name for himself as one of the chief exponents of the rustic school of painting which had a great vogue from about the middle of the century to the early 'eighties". He worked in London and Addlestone, Surrey.

== Works ==
Cobbett was known for idyllic rustic scenes and depictions of children.

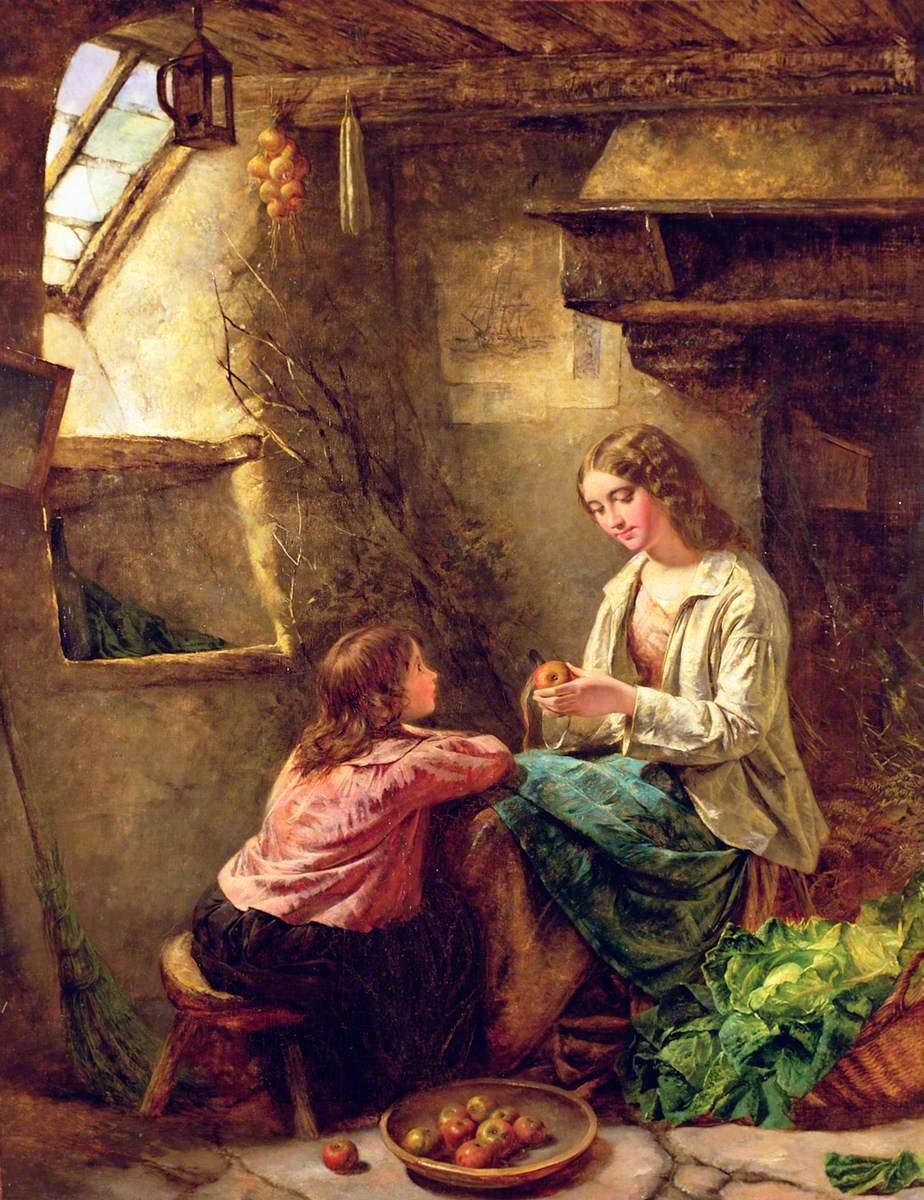
Peeling Apples by Edward John Cobbett

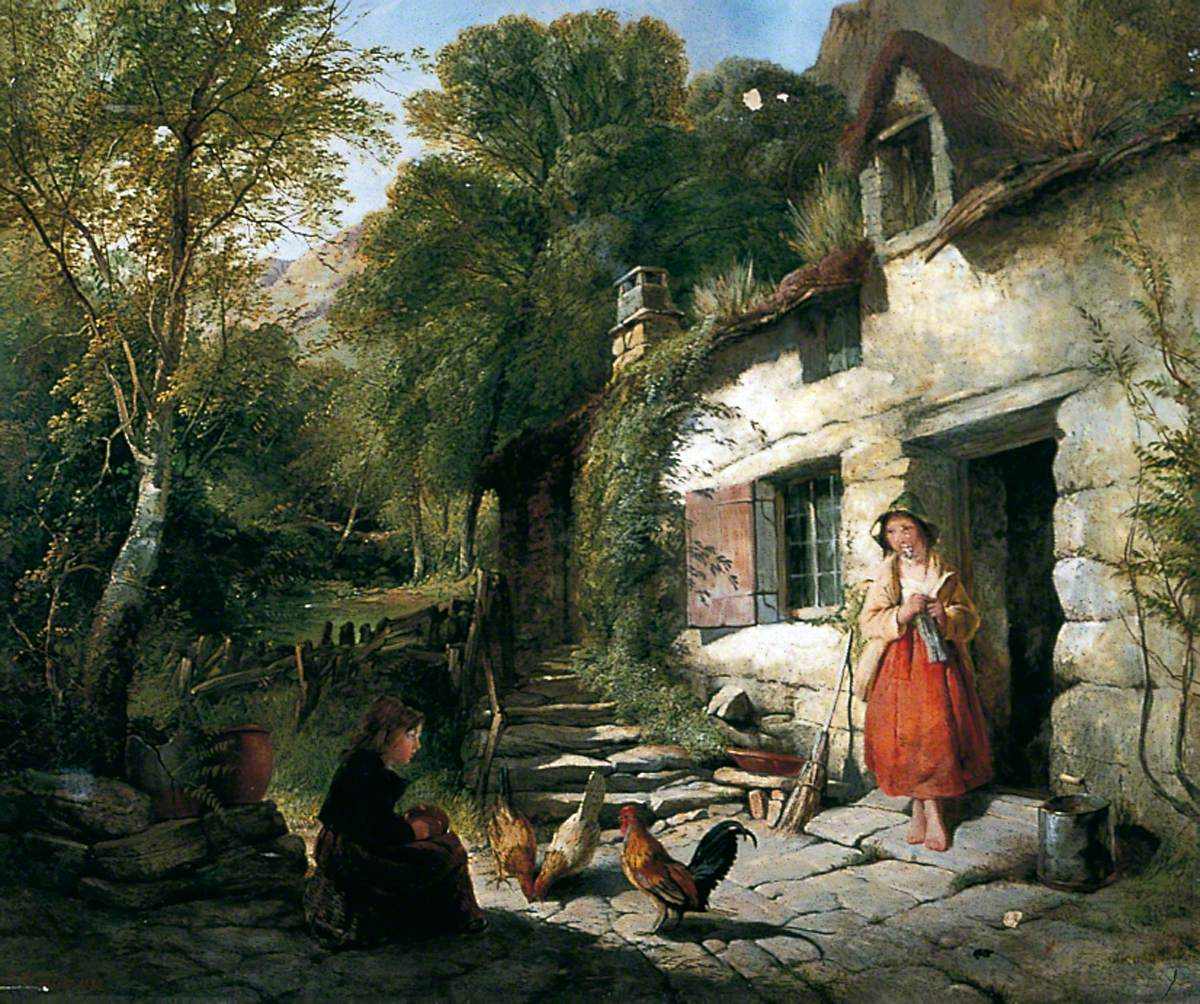
The Cottage by Edward John Cobbett

=== Exhibitions ===
Cobbett exhibited at the British Institution, the Royal Academy from 1833 to 1880 (including "over thirty consecutive years"), the Suffolk Street Gallery and the Society of British Artists, particularly on landscape and flower subjects.

=== Collections ===
- Mercer Art Gallery, Harrogate: Peeling Apples (undated)
