= Lord Simon =

Lord Simon may refer to multiple peerages in the United Kingdom:

== Hereditary peers ==
- Holders of the peerage Viscount Simon
  - John Simon, 1st Viscount Simon (1873–1954)
  - John Gilbert Simon, 2nd Viscount Simon (1902–1993)
  - Jan David Simon, 3rd Viscount Simon (1940–2021)
- Holders of the peerage Baron Simon of Wythenshawe
  - Ernest Simon, 1st Baron Simon of Wythenshawe (1879–1960)
  - Roger Simon, 2nd Baron Simon of Wythenshawe (1913–2002)
  - Matilda Simon, 3rd Baroness Simon of Wythenshawe (born 1955)

== Life peers ==
- David Simon, Baron Simon of Highbury (born 1939)
- Jack Simon, Baron Simon of Glaisdale (1911–2006)
