= Brian Simon =

English educationist and historian (1915–2002)

The Honourable Brian Simon
- Born: 26 March 1915
- Died: 17 January 2002 (aged 86)
- Occupations: Professor, teacher
- Known for: Communist activism, educational activism
- Spouse: Joan Peel (m. 1941)
- Parents: Ernest Simon, 1st Baron Simon of Wythenshawe (father); Shena Simon (mother)
- Relatives: Roger Simon (brother); Matilda Simon (niece); Henry Gustav Simon (grandfather)

Academic background
- Education: Gresham's School; Schule Schloss Salem; Trinity College, Cambridge (BA); Institute of Education, University College London (PGDE); University of Manchester (did not graduate)

Academic work
- Discipline: Education
- Institutions: University of Leicester
- Main interests: Comprehensive education History of education in England

President of the National Union of Students
- In office 1939–1940
- Preceded by: R R S Ward
- Succeeded by: P A H Rivett

President of the British Educational Research Association
- In office 1977–1978
- Preceded by: Jack Wrigley
- Succeeded by: Jim Eggleston

Personal details
- Party: Communist Party of Great Britain
- Other political affiliations: Labour Party

Military service
- Allegiance: United Kingdom
- Branch/service: British Army
- Years of service: 1940–1945
- Unit: Dorsetshire Regiment; Royal Corps of Signals; General Headquarters Liaison Regiment
- Conflict: World War II

Brian Simon (26 March 1915 – 17 January 2002) was an English educationist and historian. A leading member of the Communist Party of Great Britain, his history reflected a Marxian interpretation.

== Background and early life ==
The younger son of Shena and Ernest Darwin Simon, he was the brother of Roger Simon, the solicitor and writer on Gramsci. Their father was granted the hereditary peerage title of Baron Simon of Wythenshawe in 1947 and thus Simon and his brother were entitled to the title of The Honourable from then onwards.

Both Lord and Lady Simon were described in Simon's autobiography as coming from "middle class" families who were "sufficiently affluent". Nevertheless, they were both leading figures in social and educational reforms in Manchester, which had a huge influence on their younger son.

Both of the Simon brothers attended the then newly established independent Gresham's School, Holt, Norfolk, where they were contemporaries of Benjamin Britten, Donald Maclean, and James Klugmann. The younger Simon also spent two terms at Schule Schloss Salem, under the headship of Kurt Hahn. His interest in education was fuelled by his experience at both schools. In 1940, Simon wrote to Joan Peel, his future wife, that at Gresham's most of his creative instincts had been driven out of him or deep underground.

== Universities and military service ==
In 1933, Simon matriculated at Trinity College, Cambridge, where he joined Cambridge University Education Society. This was where he was introduced to a number of radical thinkers in the field of education who were invited guest speakers, including Dora Russell, Maria Montessori, A. S. Neill, and Alfred Adler. He later became president of the society in his final year of studies. As an undergraduate, Simon spent two years studying for Part I of the English tripos before transferring to Economics, which took another two years. He described his choice of subject as "an unusual combination but one which proved useful later".

After Cambridge, in Autumn 1937, Simon went to the University College London's Institute of Education to train as a teacher. His lecturers included Joseph Lauwerys and Reinhold Schairer. His interest in history of education was partly influenced by Sir Fred Clarke, who was director of the Institute at the time. As part of the teaching diploma, he completed placements at a senior school in Islington for boys aged between 11 and 14 years as well as at the City of London School, where he taught English, and social studies at sixth form.

=== Political involvements ===
In 1935, Simon joined the Communist Party of Great Britain after being recruited by Klugmann, who he had known from school, as well as John Cornford. He was also involved with the student Marxist Study Group.

In addition to the Communist Party, Simon was also a member of the University Labour Federation and thus automatically a member of the Labour Party. In 1937, he was appointed as assistant secretary to the party's newly formed education advisory committee, where he worked alongside secretary Barbara Drake, chairman Morgan Jones, MPs James Chuter Ede, Reginald Sorensen, Hastings Lees-Smith, and George Tomlinson, as well as R. H. Tawney. The group was tasked with forming the Labour Party's education policies for a general election due to take place in 1940.

Around the same time as Simon's involvement in Labour's Education Advisory Committee, he was also heavily involved with the National Union of Students (NUS). During his diploma course at the Institute of Education, he was elected as "NUS Secretary", which involved liaising between the Institute and the NUS. By the end of his training year, in 1938, he was elected as Vice-President of the NUS, going on to become President of the organisation in 1939. Through his role at the NUS, he travelled to many international student conferences, one such visit being with Guy Burgess to Moscow in the summer of 1939. His work at the NUS led to the publication of his first book, A Student’s View of the Universities, which came out in 1943.

=== Military service ===
During the Second World War, Simon served in the Dorsetshire Regiment and the Royal Corps of Signals and was attached to the 'Phantom Regiment' (General Headquarters Liaison Regiment), which took him to many places and led to a lifelong friendship with the actor David Niven. Others who served with Simon in the Phantom Regiment included his former Cambridge lecturer Michael Oakeshott, Jakie and Michael Astor, future Tory MP Hugh Fraser, and actor Hugh Williams.

== Teaching and lecturing career ==
After the war, Simon returned to Manchester and began his teaching career at the age of 30, seven years after completing his diploma. He worked at primary schools in Wythenshawe and central Manchester, followed by a secondary modern school on Varna Street in Openshaw. In 1947, he was appointed as a master at the selective Salford Grammar School, where he taught mainly English for three years. At the school, he produced a play that cast a young Albert Finney, who went on to act professionally.

As a teacher at Salford, Simon was struck by the academic success of pupils who had transferred over from non-selective schools, which at time surpassed the attainment of pupils who had passed the original eleven-plus exam to gain entry to the school. This led to his curiosity around and scepticism towards psychometric and intelligence testing, which inspired him to enrol at Manchester University's School of Education to study for a Master of Education. However, he did not eventually complete this qualification.

In 1950, Simon applied for a post as a Lecturer in Education at the University of Leicester and was accepted following an interview with Professor Frederick Attenborough. He would remain at the university for 30 years, becoming reader in 1964, and professor in 1966, retiring as an emeritus professor in 1980. Among his students at Leicester was the historian David Reeder. His interests in intelligence testing continued at Leicester and led to a study on this topic, later published in his 1953 book, Intelligence Testing and the Comprehensive School. This work earned the respect from even reviewers for publications that were usually pro-selective education.

Simon collaborated with his wife Joan in many professional endeavours, including the establishment of the History of Education Society in 1967 and the International Standing Conference for the History of Education in 1980, serving as the inaugural President of the latter.

In 1958, with his colleagues Robin Pedley and Jack Walton, Simon was a cofounder of the independent academic journal FORUM as a platform to promote comprehensive education. He would remain on the journal's editorial board until 1989. He also served as President of the British Educational Research Association (BERA) from 1977 to 1978.

=== Reputation and reception ===
Simon emerged as a major figure in the world of education, writing on the history and politics of education and advocating a national system of comprehensive schools. He received an honorary Doctor of Letters degree from University of Warwick on 15 July 1998 and the oration from Robin Alexander at the ceremony recognised "his unswerving commitment to the causes of social justice and human perfectibility" as the principle underpinning Simon's work both as a campaigner and a scholar.

At the same time, Simon also faced attacks and criticisms due to his advocacy for comprehensive education. According to Anne Corbett's obituary in The Guardian, those who opposed comprehensive schools painted Simon as "an upper-class intellectual who misunderstood the needs of the working-class child". His membership of the Communist Party, for whom he was a spokesman, was another factor that drew criticisms towards Simon, particularly during the 1950s and 1960s. Another obituary, published in the History Workshop Journal, noted that his continued employment at the University of Leicester led to "a McCarthyite public debate about the promotion of Communists within British universities". Nevertheless, he was supported by his vice-chancellor Charles Wilson, who wrote to the editor of The Times, William Haley, to condemn articles that called for Simon's dismissal due to his election to an executive position of the Communist Party.

== Personal life and death ==
On 12 February 1941 Brian Simon married Joan Peel (1915–2005), who was working as an assistant editor of the Times Educational Supplement at the time. She was the daughter of Home Peel, a civil servant in the India Office and a descendant of former Prime Minister, Sir Robert Peel. They had two sons, Alan (1943–1991) and Martin (born in 1944). Both of the Simon children attended the Gateway Grammar School for Boys in Leicester, which was known at the time for being progressive in accepting pupils who had failed the eleven-plus.

Simon died from lung cancer on 17 January 2002 at his home. He was survived by his wife and their younger son, Martin.

=== Legacy ===
Following his death, Simon's personal papers are donated to the Archives at the Institute of Education, University of London, where he had trained as a teacher. The British Educational Research Association created the Brian Simon Educational Research Fellowship in his honour, financed by a donation from his estate.

On 28 September 2002, a memorial lecture in honour of both Brian Simon and Caroline Benn, his colleague who had died two years earlier, took place at the Institute of Education. The lecture, entitled, Comprehensive Schools Then, Now and in the Future: is it time to draw a line in the sand and create a new ideal?, was delivered by Tim Brighouse.

In 2023, UCL Press published an open-access biography titled Brian Simon and the Struggle for Education.

== Publications ==
During his career, Simon wrote 35 books in addition to several pamphlets and journal articles. Of note was the Studies in the History of Education series, which consisted of four volumes:

1. The two nations and the educational structure, 1780–1870 (first published in 1960 under the title Studies in the History of Education, 1780–1870 and retitled in 1974)
2. Education and the Labour Movement, 1870–1920 (first published in 1965)
3. The Politics of Educational Reform, 1920–1940 (first published in 1874)
4. Education and the social order, 1940–1990 (first published in 1991)

Other titles written by Simon include:

- A Student's View of the Universities (Longmans, Green and Co., 1943)
- Intelligence Testing and the Comprehensive School (Lawrence & Wishart, 1953)
- The Common Secondary School (1955)
- Education in Leicester, 1540-1940: A regional study (Leicester University Press, 1968)
- With Caroline Benn – Halfway There: Report on the British Comprehensive School Reform (McGraw Hill, 1970)
- Intelligence, Psychology, and Education: A Marxist critique (1971)
- Does Education Matter? (Lawrence & Wishart, 1985) - ISBN 0-85315-635-2
- Bending the Rules: The Baker "reform" of education (Lawrence & Wishart, 1988) - ISBN 0-85315-693-X
- What Future for Education (Lawrence & Wishart, 1992)
- With Clyde Chitty – SOS: Save Our Schools (Lawrence & Wishart, 1993) - ISBN 0-85315-782-0
- The state and educational change: Essays in the history of education and pedagogy (Lawrence & Wishart, 1994) - ISBN 0-85315-806-1
- A Life in Education (1998) - ISBN 0-85315-8665
