= Joan Simon =

British historian

- Born: Joan Home Peel; 1915
- Died: August 15, 2005 (aged 89–90)
- Occupation: Writer; translator
- Education: Roedean School
- Genre: History; biography
- Subject: Education
- Notable works: Educational psychology in the U.S.S.R. (1963); The social origins of English education (1970)
- Spouse: Brian Simon (m. 1941; died 2002)
- Children: 2
- Relatives: Alfred Emmott, 1st Baron Emmott (grandfather); Mary Emmott (grandmother)

Joan Simon (née Peel, 1915–15 August 2005) was an English historian, specializing in education, the wife and close collaborator of the educationist and historian Brian Simon.

== Early life and background ==
Joan Home Peel was born in 1915, daughter of the Honourable Mary Gwendolen and Captain Home Peel. Her mother was the elder daughter of Alfred Emmott, the first and last Baron Emmott, and his wife Mary Gertrude. Her father was a direct descendant of the 19th-century prime minister, Robert Peel. He was killed in action in 1918 during World War I. Both her mother and maternal grandmother served, separately, as president of the National Council of Women of Great Britain.

Joan Peel, as she was then known, was educated at Roedean School, where her mother had also attended, from 1925 to 1932. She never attended university.

== Adulthood ==
After leaving school, Simon worked at a Montessori School in East London before joining the Times Educational Supplement as an editorial assistant. She was offered the job after writing to Harold Dent, the editor, that the publication "was not radical enough for her tastes".

She met her future husband Brian Simon while he was studying at Trinity College, Cambridge. They married in 1941, and had two sons, Alan and Martin.

They entered into a close partnership in their work, which continued until Brian's death in January 2002. In their introduction to Rethinking radical education: Essays in honour of Brian Simon, Brian's colleagues Ali Rattansi and David Reeder wrote that Joan "shared his educational and political interests throughout as well as being a significant educational historian in her own right". It was said of Brian that " his partnership with Joan Simon cannot be extracted from Brian’s work as a whole".

In the 1950s, she and her husband Brian investigated, described and publicized the views of A. R. Luria and L. S. Vygotskii, founders of cultural-historical psychology in the then Soviet Union. In the Autumn of 1958 Brian was one of the founders of FORUM, a journal devoted to educational issues. She published articles in FORUM in 1964 and 1965 describing developments in comprehensive education in Bradford, Sheffield, Liverpool and Manchester. In 1973 the magazine published a pamphlet written by Joan titled Indictment of Margaret Thatcher, Secretary of State 1970–1973. In 1986 she published a biography of her mother in law, Shena Simon, who had been active in education reform in England in the 1930s and 1940s.

Joan Simon continued to work until a few months before her death in August 2005.

In 2007 the journal History of Education posthumously published her last article: An 'energetic and controversial' historian of education yesterday and today: A. F. Leach (1851–1915).

== Bibliography ==
- Simon, Brian; Simon, Joan, eds. (1963). Educational psychology in the U.S.S.R.. Translated by Joan Simon. Routledge and Kegan Paul.
- Simon, Joan (1970). The social origins of English education. Routledge. ISBN 978-0-7100-6946-7.
- Simon, Joan (1979). Education and Society in Tudor England. Cambridge University Press. ISBN 978-0-521-29679-3.
- Simon, Joan (1986). Shena Simon: Feminist and Educationist. Privately printed.
