= Lady Simon =

Lady Simon may refer to:

- Rachel Simon, Lady Simon (1823–1899), British author
- Kathleen Simon, Viscountess Simon (1869–1955), Anglo-Irish activist
- Shena Simon, Baroness Simon of Wythenshawe (1883–1972), British politician and feminist
- Matilda Simon, 3rd Baroness Simon of Wythenshawe (born 1955), British academic
