= Wornington Road School =

Coordinates: 51.52268°N 0.20824°W

Wornington Road School refers to buildings that have been used for a variety of purposes since 1874 in North Kensington, London.

== History ==
The first recorded school on Wornington Road was known as the Wornington Road Board School established in March 1874. The building was divided into a Boys, a Girls and an Infants school. A little later a school for the blind was added. The Infants’ School was the largest in London finding places for 813 children in ten classrooms.

The building was an imposing one, reflecting the new emphasis on education, but its location adjacent to the railway with steam trains thundering past every few minutes was a hindrance. A reference in Sentimental Education: Schooling, Popular Culture and the Regulation of Liberty by James Donald, '... in the board school Robson designed in Wornington Rd 1874'. Edward Robert Robson architect and author of the highly influential ‘School Architecture’ in 1876. He then became architect at the LCC (presumably London County Council).

The building was demolished in 1936 by The London County Council to be replaced by Wornington Road Elementary School with better facilities including a library and a gymnasium with changing rooms and showers. During WWII the school buildings became an emergency centre for the Auxiliary Fire Service. Classrooms were turned into dormitories for the firefighters and the school medical room became a Watch Room from which emergency calls were taken and fire engines dispatched to deal with the effects of the blitz in the nearby streets. Smaller school house on south corner of the site also rebuilt around 1936, LCC Architects' Department. Signed off by G.P. Wheeler.

After the war The Florence Gladstone School, which educated girls between 11 and 15, used the Wornington Road building from 1951. Then from 1958 it was the turn of the Isaac Newton Boys’ Upper School. The Wornington Road Infants’ School was still in the premises in the 1950s. When it closed the Ainsworth Nursery moved in but moved again in 1977 to the ground floor of Trellick Tower. The Isaac Newton boys moved out when their school joined with Holland Park Comprehensive in 1983.

Alan Johnson the MP has written extensively about his life in the area and attending the school.

== Changes ==
Significant changes in the local community were reflected in the ongoing use of the building, Adult Education had expanded during the seventies under the Inner London Education Authority (ILEA) and as the number of primary school pupils dropped due classrooms at Wornington Road were increasingly used for evening and day classes for adults. By 1972 there were four orchestras and two choirs, special English and Maths classes for ‘people newly arrived in England who speak no English or wish to improve their English‘. 'Fresh Start' courses were provided for adults who had missed out on basic skills and ‘mature students’ were supported via a pioneering Return to Study course to prepare for university entrance. Caroline Benn, wife of the MP, has described her role as a lecturer in this department at the college. The building hosted the Muslim Cultural Heritage Centre from 1992 until the move to purpose built premises in Acklam Road in 1998.

== College ==
Wornington Road ultimately became the hub of Kensington and Chelsea College with many thousands of students attending a wide range of vocational courses. Established in its present form in 1993 when finance became available from the Further Education Funding Council, the Kensington and Chelsea College now runs many part-time courses, some Wornington students go on to higher education, while others retrain to acquire skills needed in a changing employment market. In 2013 this campus renamed from Wornington Centre to Kensington Centre.
