= Matilda Simon, 3rd Baroness Simon of Wythenshawe =

British peer (born 1955)

The Right Honourable The Baroness Simon of Wythenshawe CEng MIMechE
- Preceded by: Roger Simon, 2nd Baron Simon of Wythenshawe

Personal details
- Born: 10 April 1955 (age 71)
- Spouse: Sally Mitchell (m. 1987; died 2014)
- Children: 2
- Parents: Roger Simon, 2nd Baron Simon of Wythenshawe (father); Anthea Daphne May (mother)
- Occupations: academic, engineer, politician, woodworker
- Political party: Green Party of England and Wales

Academic background
- Education: St Paul's School, London; University of Oxford (BA; University of Manchester (PhD)

Academic work
- Discipline: Engineering
- Sub-discipline: Mechanical Engineering
- Institutions: Manchester Metropolitan University; Sheffield Hallam University
- Main interests: Sustainable engineering

Matilda Simon, 3rd Baroness Simon of Wythenshawe (born 10 April 1955) is a British peeress, retired academic, woodworker, and Green Party member. In 2002 she succeeded her father as the Baron Simon of Wythenshawe. In 2015 she came out as a transgender woman. Her claim to the barony, following her gender transition, was accepted by the Lord Chancellor in 2022, so she became the first transgender peer of the realm.

== Early life, family, and education ==
Lady Simon was born in 1955, the second child of The Honourable Roger Simon and Anthea Daphne Simon. She was assigned male at birth. Her father was a solicitor, political activist, and left-wing journalist who served as secretary of the Labour Research Department. In 1960, her father inherited the Simon barony of Wythenshawe upon the death of his father, Ernest Simon, 1st Baron Simon of Wythenshawe, who was elevated to the peerage in 1947 by George VI. Her grandmother, Shena Simon, Lady Simon of Wythenshawe, was a feminist educationalist and politician and the eponym of the Shena Simon Campus of The Manchester College. Matilda Simon's great-grandfather was the Prussian engineer Henry Gustav Simon. Simon and her elder sister Margaret later wrote the foreword to a book about their grandparents and the extended Simon family, The Simons of Manchester: How one family shaped a city and a nation.

Simon was educated at St Paul's School, London, before attending Balliol College, Oxford between 1973 and 1977. At Oxford, she earned a first class degree in Engineering and won the Lubbock Prize for Engineering undergraduates. She was also a member of her college's Junior Common Room committee. In 2020, she wrote that she was "oddly proud of having been one of the first women at Balliol, even though nobody was aware of it."

Simon moved to University of Manchester's Engineering Department in 1979 and in 1983 earned a Doctor of Philosophy degree.

== Career ==
Before starting her academic career at Manchester, Simon worked from 1977 to 1979 in the nuclear power industry.

From 1983 to 1998, she worked as a senior lecturer in mechanical engineering at Manchester Metropolitan University. Between 1988 and 1990, she also lectured at University of Zimbabwe. She was registered as a chartered engineer and as a member of the Institution of Mechanical Engineers in 1991. From 1998 to 2011, she worked as a principal lecturer at Sheffield Hallam University.

Some time before 2020, she retired from lecturing to work as a woodworker and furniture maker, making use of local hardwood. She has said that she uses her "engineering skills and research background in sustainable design" in her current line of work.

In March 2014, she and her partner founded Rollins Wood, a 7-acre community woodland in Marple Bridge, planting 1,200 trees the following year.

=== Politics ===
Simon joined the Green Party of England and Wales around the year of 2016. She stood as a Green candidate in the 2026 Stockport Metropolitan Borough Council election. Contesting for a seat in the Bredbury Green & Romiley ward, she came third with 475 votes (10.3%) and was not elected; the seat was eventually won by the Liberal Democrat candidate.

== Peerage ==
As Lady Simon was assigned male at birth, later coming out as a transgender woman in 2015, she inherited the Simon barony of Wythenshawe in 2002 after the death of her father, which only passes to the heirs male of the body of the first Baron. Her claim to the peerage was approved by the Lord Chancellor, Dominic Raab, in 2022 after she had changed her gender identity. According to the Gender Recognition Act 2004, a person changing gender does not affect the descent of any peerage or dignity or title of honour. In 2022, she successfully applied to be added to the "Register of Hereditary Peers", the list of "eligible hereditary peers who have indicated their wish to stand in by-elections for the House". However, she appeared to have been removed from that list around May 2023.

The Daily Telegraph suggested she could stand in the by-election for the House of Lords in 2023 to replace Lucius Cary, 15th Viscount Falkland, but she did not do so. (Cary had been elected to the House as a Liberal Democrat in 1999, but switched to Crossbencher in 2011. By convention, he would be replaced by a Liberal Democrat, but peers from any party were allowed to stand for the by-election.) Had she succeeded Lord Falkland, she would have been the first transgender woman to join the House of Lords as one of the ninety-two hereditary peers. She would have become the first woman with a hereditary peerage to sit in the House of Lords since the retirement of Margaret of Mar, 31st Countess of Mar and the second transgender person in Parliament, after Katie Wallis.

Most British peerages (including the Simon barony) can only be inherited by men under the system of agnatic primogeniture. No female hereditary peers have entered the House of Lords through the by-election process yet, since no woman has ever stood as a candidate for a by-election. Conservative politician Anne Jenkin, Baroness Jenkin of Kennington, and Charlotte Carew Pole both called into question the validity of Lady Simon's peerage, since she is only able to hold the peerage due to being assigned male at birth. Carew Pole discussed Lady Simon's situation with The Daily Telegraph, saying, "Lady Matilda, Baron of Wythenshawe, has helped highlight several issues around inheritance and gender laws, where we now find ourselves in the absurd position of a younger son inheriting a title but identifying as a woman to stand in the hereditary peers by-elections, so keeping her new identity of a woman and the rights of a man to inherit." Carew Pole went on to question challenge the validity of Lady Simon's title, as she is not the eldest child of the 2nd Baron Simon of Wythenshawe and therefore, as she is also a woman, the title should go to her elder sister, The Hon. Margaret Simon. However, Margaret Simon could not have succeeded to the barony even if Matilda had been born female, as the barony can only be inherited by "heirs male of the body"; it would have passed to a male-line cousin of Margaret and Matilda instead.

== Personal life ==
According to her entry in Who's Who, Simon was married to Sally Mitchell from 1987 until her death in 2014; she has two daughters. She has volunteered with the British charity Diversity Role Models.

Peerage of the United Kingdom
Preceded by Roger Simon	Baron Simon of Wythenshawe; 2002–present	Incumbent
