= 1911 Oldham by-election =

UK parliamentary by-election

The 1911 Oldham by-election was a Parliamentary by-election held on 13 November 1911. The constituency returned two Members of Parliament (MP) to the House of Commons of the United Kingdom, elected by the first past the post voting system.

== Vacancy ==
Alfred Emmott had been Liberal MP for dual member Oldham since gaining a seat from the Conservatives in 1899. He was appointed Under-Secretary of State for the Colonies by H. H. Asquith and the following month he was raised to the peerage as Baron Emmott, of Oldham in the County Palatine of Lancaster.

== Electoral history ==
This was the result at the previous General Election;

General election December 1910: Oldham
Party	Candidate	Votes	%	±%
Liberal	Alfred Emmott	17,108	28.1	−1.9
Liberal	Andrew William Barton	16,941	27.9	−1.5
Conservative	Arthur Edward Wrigley	13,440	22.1	+1.1
Conservative	Edmund Bartley-Denniss	13,281	21.9	+2.3
Majority		3,501	5.8	−2.6
Turnout		60,770	86.8	−5.0
Liberal hold		Swing	-1.5	
Liberal hold		Swing	-1.3	

== Candidates ==
The Liberal candidate chosen to defend the seat was Arthur Stanley. He had been Liberal MP for Eddisbury, Cheshire until losing to the Conservastives in January 1910. He had lost there again in December 1910. His sister, Venetia Stanley, was a close correspondent of the Prime Minister and leader of the Liberal party, H. H. Asquith.

The Conservative candidate was Edmund Bartley-Denniss who had stood here in December 1910. His only connection with the area was that his father-in-law had recently been Mayor of Oldham.

The Labour party, who had never previously stood a candidate here, intervened in the contest, choosing William Cornforth Robinson as their candidate. He was General Secretary of the Amalgamated Association of Beamers, Twisters and Drawers and President of the United Textile Factory Workers Association. His candidature was significant given the large number of textile workers resident in the constituency. Since 1906, most dual member constituencies in industrialised towns had seen one Liberal and one Labour candidate run in harness against two Unionists. Oldham had been an exception to this with two Liberals running. The Labour Party national leadership were therefore keen to see this practice extended to Oldham and were happy to back the locally chosen Labour candidate.

== Campaign ==
Polling Day was set for 13 November.

== Result ==
The Conservatives gained the seat. The Labour intervention had proved crucial in denying the Liberal victory.

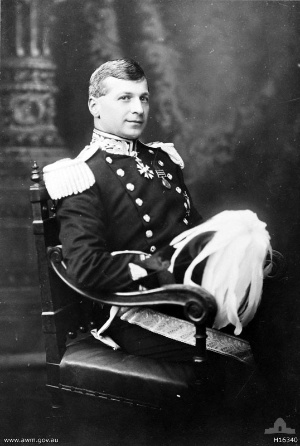
Arthur Stanley

Oldham by-election, 1911
Party	Candidate	Votes	%	±%
Conservative	Edmund Bartley-Denniss	12,255	40.4	−3.6
Liberal	Arthur Stanley	10,623	35.0	−21.0
Labour	William C. Robinson	7,448	24.6	New
Majority		1,632	5.4	N/A
Turnout		30,326	85.1	−1.7
Conservative gain from Liberal		Swing	+8.7	

== Aftermath ==
A General Election was due to take place by the end of 1915. By the autumn of 1914, the following candidates had been adopted to contest that election. (Due to the outbreak of war, the election never took place.) Despite Labour finishing third, their candidate had done well enough to support a claim to run in tandem with a Liberal in future, which is why only one Liberal candidate was in place. Robinson was fortunate enough to have his candidacy sponsored by the UTFWA.

- Liberal Party = Andrew William Barton
- Labour Party = William C. Robinson
- Unionist Party = Edmund Bartley-Denniss

General election 14 December 1918: Oldham
Party	Candidate	Votes	%	±%
Unionist	*Edmund Bartley-Denniss	26,586	34.4	
Liberal	*Andrew William Barton	26,254	33.9	
Labour	William C. Robinson	15,178	19.6	
Liberal	Walter Rea	9,323	12.1	
Majority		11,076	14.3	
Turnout		77,341		
Unionist hold		Swing		
Liberal hold		Swing		

- Barton and Denniss were the endorsed candidates of the Coalition Government.
