= Jewkes =

Jewkes is a surname. Notable people with the surname include:

- John Jewkes, multiple people
- Rachel Jewkes, South African scientist
