= Alfred Emmott, 1st Baron Emmott =

British politician

The Right Honourable The Lord Emmott GCMG GBE PC
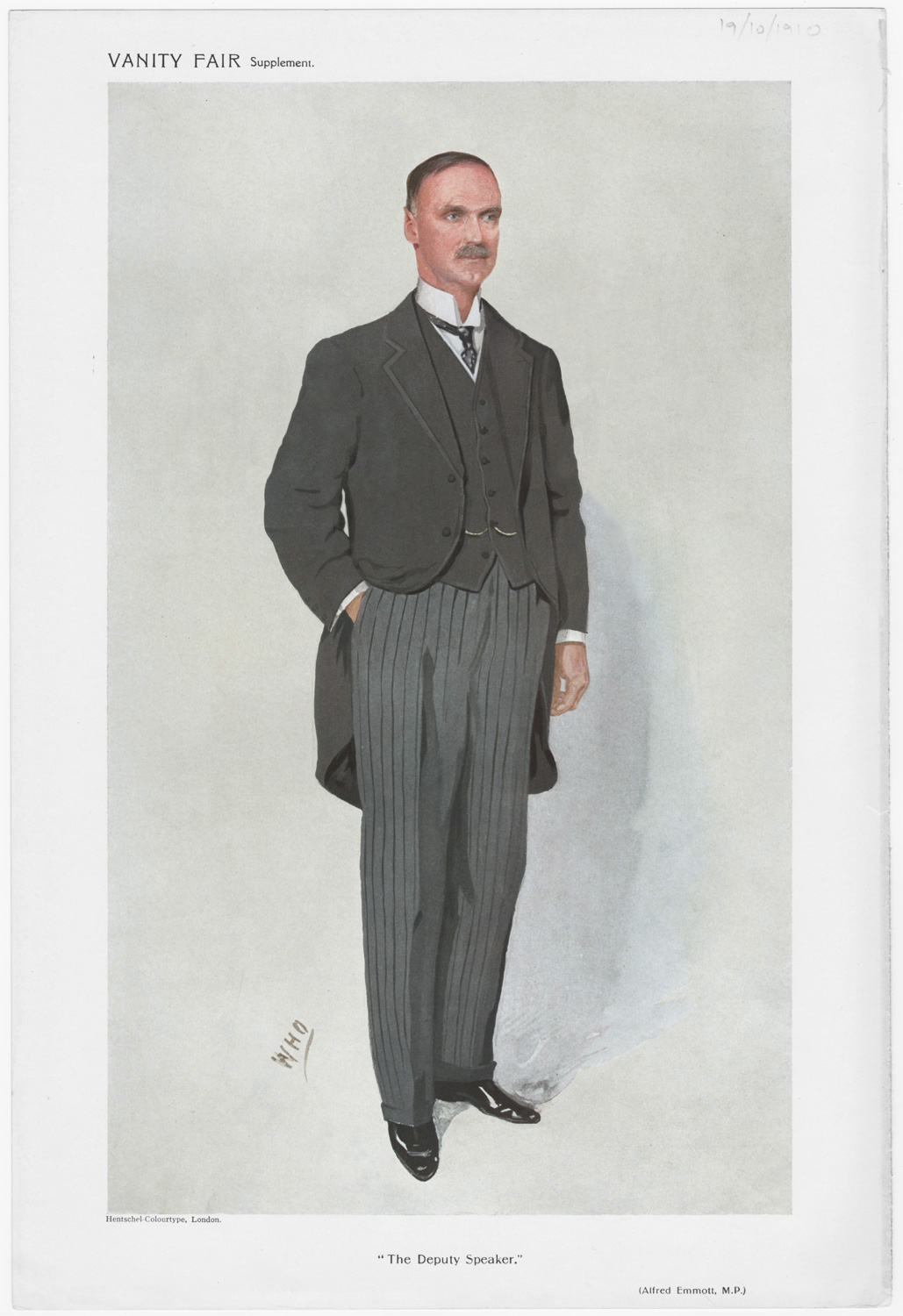
- "The Deputy Speaker" as depicted in Vanity Fair, 19 October 1910

Deputy Speaker of the House of Commons Chairman of Ways and Means
- In office 1906–1911
- Monarchs: Edward VII; George V
- Preceded by: Sir John Grant Lawson, 1st Baronet
- Succeeded by: John Henry Whitley

Under-Secretary of State for the Colonies
- In office 23 October 1911 – 6 August 1914
- Monarch: George V
- Prime Minister: H. H. Asquith
- Preceded by: The Lord Lucas of Crudwell
- Succeeded by: The Lord Islington

First Commissioner of Works
- In office 6 August 1914 – 25 May 1915
- Monarch: George V
- Prime Minister: H. H. Asquith
- Preceded by: The Earl Beauchamp
- Succeeded by: Lewis Vernon Harcourt

Personal details
- Born: 8 May 1858
- Died: 13 December 1926 (aged 68) London
- Party: Liberal
- Spouse: Mary Lees
- Education: University of London

Alfred Emmott, 1st Baron Emmott (8 May 1858 – 13 December 1926) was a British businessman and Liberal Party politician.

== Background and education ==
The eldest surviving son of Thomas Emmott, of Brookfield, Oldham, he was educated at a Friends' School in Kendal, Westmorland and at Grove House School in Tottenham before studying for a BA at the University of London. Afterwards, he became a partner in Emmott and Walshall, cotton spinners, of Oldham.

== Political career ==
In 1881, Emmott was elected as a Liberal to Oldham Municipal Borough Council, where he would serve as a councillor for twelve years. He was the mayor of the town between 1891 and 1892. In a by-election in 1899, he was elected Liberal member of parliament for Oldham, a seat he held until 1911. It was a two-member seat, and Winston Churchill, who started his political career there, was the other member from 1900 to 1906.

Emmott served as Chairman of Ways and Means (Deputy Speaker of the House of Commons) from 1906 to 1911 and was sworn of the Privy Council in 1908. In October 1911, he was appointed Under-Secretary of State for the Colonies by H. H. Asquith and the following month he was raised to the peerage as Baron Emmott, of Oldham in the County Palatine of Lancaster. He remained at the Colonial Office until 1914 and was then a member of Asquith's cabinet as First Commissioner of Works between 1914 and 1915.

Emmott was also Director of the War Trade Department between 1915 and 1919, chaired the Royal Commission on Decimal Coinage between 1918 and 1920 and was President of the Royal Statistical Society between 1922 and 1924. He was a churchman, but his education at the Friends' School and his ancestry led him to sympathize with nonconformists. He was appointed a Knight Grand Cross of the Order of St Michael and St George (GCMG) in 1914 and a Knight Grand Cross of the Order of the British Empire (GBE) in 1917.

In his approach to politics, Emmott was a strong supporter of the government's social reforms. This was arguably reflected in 1910 when Emmott, in response to Conservative critics who attacked the Liberals as "socialistic", retorted that "so far as we have gone in the direction of Socialism, so-called, whether it be in regard to free and compulsory education, whether it be in regard to old age pensions, or in respect of any other reform, we have not diminished, but rather added to the liberty of the individual."

== Family ==
Lord Emmott married Mary Gertrude, a daughter of J. W. Lees, in 1887. Lady Emmott was educated at Queen's College, London and was a member of many philanthropic and civic associations, serving at one point as President of the National Council of Women of Great Britain. Lady and Lord Emmott had two daughters, Mary Gwendolen (later known as Mrs Home Peel), born in 1888 and Dorothy (later known as Mrs Christopher Barlow), born in 1890. Through their elder daughter, Lord Emmett is grandfather to the historian and author Joan Simon.

In December 1926, aged 67, Lord Emmott died very suddenly of angina pectoris at his home in London, on a day when he was engaged to speak at a Liberal Party rally. The barony became extinct on his death, as he had no son.

== Arms ==
Coat of arms of Alfred Emmott, 1st Baron Emmott
Crest In front of a demi-bull Sable armed Or semee of annulets and gorged with a collar gemel Argant and holding between the legs a plate three escallops reversed Or. Escutcheon Per pale Azure and Sable on a fess Argent cotised Or between three plates each charged with a bull’s head cabossed of the first as many annulets of the second. Supporters On either side a bull reguardant Argent semee of roses and collared Gules Motto Tiens La Vraie (Hold to the Truth)

Parliament of the United Kingdom
Preceded by Robert Ascroft; James Francis Oswald	Member of Parliament for Oldham; 1899–1911; With: Walter Runciman 1899–1900; Winston Churchill 1900–1906; John Albert Bright 1906–1910; William Barton 1910–1911	Succeeded by Edmund Bartley-Denniss; William Barton
Preceded by Sir John Lawson, Bt	Chairman of Ways and Means; 1906–1911	Succeeded by John Henry Whitley
Political offices
Preceded by The Lord Lucas of Crudwell	Under-Secretary of State for the Colonies; 1911–1914	Succeeded by The Lord Islington
Preceded by The Earl Beauchamp	First Commissioner of Works; 1914–1915	Succeeded by Lewis Harcourt
Peerage of the United Kingdom
New creation	Baron Emmott; 1911–1926	Extinct
