= Manchester College of Arts and Technology =

Former network of art schools in Manchester, England

- Manchester, Greater Manchester; England, United Kingdom

Information
- Type: Further Education and Higher Education
- Closed: August 2008
- Local authority: Manchester City Council
- Principal: Peter Tavernor
- Gender: Mixed
- Merger: Merged with City College Manchester in August 2008
- Successor: The Manchester College
- Website: web.archive.org/web/20080724114051/http://www.mancat.ac.uk:80/

Manchester College of Arts and Technology (or for short MANCAT) is a former network of further and higher education campuses in the city of Manchester, England specialising in courses in the Arts and Technology, however courses in many other fields were also offered. MANCAT was merged with the City College Manchester in August 2008, forming The Manchester College, which is now the largest college in Europe, according to the TMC website. Over 500 courses were offered at all levels and the college was one of the largest in the Greater Manchester area, with sites at Openshaw, Moston and other locations. MANCAT had around 45,000 students, making it alone one of the largest further education colleges in the United Kingdom.

== History ==
MANCAT was formed in the early 1990s through the merger of North Manchester Community College and Central Manchester College of Technology. Initially there were seven colleges in the 1980s, the merger reduced this number to four by 1986. Since that time it had steadily grown through the acquisitions of other buildings, colleges and sites, including the former Ellen Wilkinson High School in Ardwick in 2000. The first principal was Nye Rowlands, formerly of Central Manchester College, and the First President of the Student Union was Phil McHugh, formerly of North Manchester Community College.

The college merged with City College Manchester to create an 80,000 student 'supercollege' known as The Manchester College in August 2008. The principal of MANCAT Peter Tavernor was appointed as head of The Manchester College.
