= John Jewkes =

John Jewkes may refer to:

- John Jewkes (MP) (1683–1743), English Member of Parliament for Aldborough
- John Jewkes (economist) (1902–1988), English classical liberal economist
