= Eva Hubback =

English feminist (1886–1949)

Eva Marian Hubback (13 April 1886 – 15 July 1949) was an English feminist and an early advocate of birth control and eugenics.

== Early life ==
Eva Marian Spielmann was born on 13 April 1886, daughter of Sir Meyer Spielmann (1856–1936). Sir Meyer was one of the three surviving sons of the eight children of banker Adam Spielmann (1812–1869), who had emigrated from Schokken (now Skoki), near Posen (now Poznań) with his own two brothers. Eva was therefore the niece of the civil engineer turned art-connoisseur Sir Isidore Spielmann (1854–1925) as well as the renowned art-critic Marion Spielmann (1856–1936) and his wife, the children's author Mabel Spielmann (1862–1938). Through them she was related to the great dynasties of Montagu/Samuel and of Sebag-Montefiore.

She was educated at Saint Felix School, Southwold, Suffolk and Newnham College, Cambridge, graduating in 1908 with first class honours in the Economics tripos. In February 1911 she married Francis William Hubback (1884–1917). They had three children, Diana, Rachel and David, before her husband died in February 1917 of wounds received in action during World War I. She was director of economic studies at Newnham and Girton from 1916 to 1917.

== Career ==
Hubback became involved in the women's suffrage movement, campaigning with Eleanor Rathbone. From 1918 to 1927 she was Parliamentary Secretary, and later President of the National Union for Equal Citizenship, which successfully campaigned for reforms to the laws affecting the rights of women and children. She became Principal of Morley College for Working Men and Women in 1927, succeeding Barbara Wootton. In 1929 she joined the Eugenics Society, becoming a Fellow in 1931, member of the council in 1932 and member of the executive committee in 1934. She assisted in establishing the Townswomen's Guild in 1930. Eva Hubback, Shena Simon and Ernest Simon co-founded the Association for Education in Citizenship in 1933. She became secretary of this association, and chairman of the Family Endowment Society.

From 1946 to 1948, Hubback represented Kensington North on the London County Council, elected on the Labour Party platform. She died on 15 July 1949.

== Legacy ==
Hubback's daughter Diana Hopkinson would become a memoirist, best known for her autobiography The Incense Tree. While an autobiography, the book serves as a key work on the life of conservative anti-Nazi campaigner and conspirator Adam von Trott, with whom she may have engaged in a love affair. Hopkinson also authored a biography of her mother.

All three of Hubback’s children were interviewed as part of the historian Brian Harrison’s Suffrage Interviews project, titled Oral evidence on the suffragette and suffragist movements: the Brian Harrison interviews. Her son, David, and daughter, Rachel, were interviewed together in February 1976. They recalled the influence of her Cambridge education, her activities in the Second World War and her interest in education for citizenship and population, two of the topics she published on in the 1940s. Hopkinson was interviewed twice, in February 1976 and October 1984, talking about Hubback’s writing, politics and work as well as the influence of her Jewish identity.

Hubback’s sister, the occupational psychologist Winifred Raphael, was interviewed about her sister in March 1976. She talks about Hubback’s education, family life, work and politics, including Hubback’s marriage outside the family’s Jewish faith, and the impact of this on the wider family.

In March 1976 Harrison conducted an interview with Erna Nelki who became secretary to Hubback as a refugee seeking work during the Second World War. She talks about her work at Hubback’s home in Hampstead, as well as working with Marjorie Sprince Stephens, also secretary to Hubback, and interviewed by Harrison in May 1976. The interviews give further insight into Hubback’s personality, public life and interest in education. In January 1977 Harrison interviewed the politician, Peggy Jay, who Hubback had contact with when Jay became a member of the Royal Commission on population. Hubback published 2 books on population in the 1940s, Population facts and policies in 1945, and The population of Britain in 1947.

== Bibliography ==
- Kenneth M. Lindsay, Stanley Baldwin of Bewdley (earl.), Eva M. Hubback, Ernest Darwin Simon (sir.) (1939). Education for citizenship in elementary schools: issued by the Association for education in citizenship. [Forewords by the Earl Baldwin of Bewdley and Kenneth M. Lindsay. Preface by E. D. Simon and Eva M. Hubback.] Oxford University press.
- Ernest Darwin Simon, Eva M. Hubback (1935). Training for citizenship. Assoc. for Education in Citizenship.
- Eva M. Hubback (1945). Population facts and policies. Pub. for British Social Hygiene Council by G. Allen & Unwin.
- Eleanor Florence Rathbone, Eva M. Hubback (1943). Family allowances: ... with an epilogue by Lord Beveridge and a new chapter on The family allowances movement 1924–1947, by Eva M. Hubback. Allen and Unwin.
- Eva Marian Spielman Hubback (1947). The population of Britain. Penguin Books.
