= John Albert Bright =

British politician

John Albert Bright

John Albert Bright (1848 – 11 November 1924) was an English industrialist and Liberal Unionist and Liberal politician.

== Family and education ==
J A Bright was the eldest son of the Liberal reformer, orator and statesman, John Bright. His family were steeped in Radical and reforming politics. His father’s brother, Jacob Bright was Liberal MP for different seats in Manchester between 1867 and 1895. His aunt was Priscilla Bright McLaren (1815–1906) a dedicated campaigner for women’s rights and the wife of Duncan McLaren the Liberal MP for Edinburgh from 1865 to 1881. His brother, William Leatham Bright (1851–1910), was Liberal MP for Stoke-on-Trent from 1885 to 1890.

As a prominent member of the Religious Society of Friends (Quakers), John Bright employed Lydia Rous as a teacher for his children. In time he sent his son to the Quaker Grove House School, in Tottenham, London. John Albert later attended University College, London, where he won a prize for experimental physics and gained his B.Sc in 1867. In 1883, he married Edith Eckersley Shawcross, the daughter of W T Shawcross from Rochdale. They had one son and a daughter.

== Career ==
John Albert had no desire to follow in his father’s footsteps and pursue a Parliamentary career, although he did share his Liberal politics and spoke at public meetings, often in support of his father. Instead, he went into the family cotton-spinning and manufacturing business and lived largely outside his father’s shadow.

He did have a public life of his own however. He was a Justice of the Peace for Lancashire and for the Borough of Rochdale where he also served on the School Board and the Town Council.

In November 1890, he chaired a meeting in Rochdale's Duckworth's Hotel, where the Rochdale Photographic Society was founded, and he became the President for the next 12 years.

== Politics ==
In 1889 however, his father’s death plunged him into the world of Parliamentary politics. Bright’s death left a vacancy in the House of Commons constituency of Birmingham Central. At the time the alliance of Liberal Unionists and Conservatives in Birmingham was delicate. The Tories wished to nominate their own candidate to fight the by-election in Birmingham Central and the Liberal Unionists, led by the charismatic Joseph Chamberlain had no desire to cede the seat to them. The Conservatives, distrusting Chamberlain’s former radicalism, immediately put forward Lord Randolph Churchill as the putative candidate but Chamberlain cleverly prevailed on Bright to step into his father’s shoes. The Birmingham Conservatives and Lord Randolph Churchill came under pressure from the party’s Chief Whip at Westminster Aretas Akers-Douglas and from Arthur Balfour, who was closely associated with Churchill. With great reluctance the Tories accepted that Bright should be the Unionist candidate, although some local Conservatives were so indignant they resigned their party posts. Bright easily won the by-election, held on 15 April 1889, against the Gladstonian Liberal William Phipson Beale by 5,621 votes to 2,561, a majority of 3,060 or 37.4% of the total poll. This election was described by the biographer of John Bright as the Liberal Unionists’ first great victory. Bright held Birmingham Central until the 1895 general election when he stood down probably under pressure from Chamberlain who felt he had not come up to his desired standards.

Later, Bright left the Liberal Unionists, perhaps smarting from Chamberlain’s attitude towards him, and reverted to his father’s original creed of Liberalism. He was Liberal candidate at Montgomery Boroughs in the 1900 general election, narrowly failing to gain the seat, losing by just 169 votes. However he was elected as Member of Parliament for Oldham at the 1906 election standing on a platform in opposition to the tariff reform programme of his old Liberal Unionist chief, Joseph Chamberlain. He retired from politics at the general election of January 1910.

Like his father, Bright held strongly pacifist views. He presided at a meeting held in Manchester in September 1899 to protest the policy which was leading to the Boer War. In their assessment of Bright’s contribution to Parliamentary affairs, The Times reported that he was a useful but inconspicuous member, doing good work in committee, especially in shaping such measures as the Children Act 1908.

== Death ==
Bright died aged 76 on 11 November 1924 at his home in Rochdale.

Parliament of the United Kingdom
| Preceded by John Bright | Member of Parliament for Birmingham Central; 1889 – 1895 | Succeeded by Sir Ebenezer Parkes |
| Preceded by Winston Churchill and Alfred Emmott | Member of Parliament for Oldham; 1906 – Jan. 1910; With: Alfred Emmott | Succeeded by Alfred Emmott and William Barton |
