= Edmund Bartley-Denniss =

British politician

- Bartley-Denniss in 1919
- Born: 9 April 1854
- Died: 20 March 1931 (aged 76)
- Education: Christ's Hospital, Hertford College, Oxford
- Occupations: Barrister and Conservative Party Member of Parliament
- Father: Edmund Pinnock Denniss

Sir Edmund Robert Bartley Bartley-Denniss KC (born Denniss, 9 April 1854 – 20 March 1931) was an English barrister, prominent Freemason and Conservative Party Member of Parliament in the United Kingdom. He was also a pioneer of the sport of cycling in Britain.

He was elected Member of Parliament (MP) for Oldham at the Oldham by-election in 1911, and held the seat until he stood down at the 1922 general election. He was knighted in April 1922, having changed his surname by deed poll on 4 January 1922 from Denniss to Bartley-Denniss. He was appointed King's Counsel on 25 October 1922.

== Family background ==
Edmund Denniss was the eldest son of Edmund Pinnock Denniss, b. Cape of Good Hope (5th son of Lt.Col. George Hamson Denniss (1758–1821) 43rd Light Infantry, and his 2nd wife Harriet Matilda Pickersgill) and Caroline Bartley (1826–1877), da. of General Sir Robert Bartley (1789–1843). George Hamson Denniss was born in Jamaica, one of 12 children of Digby Denniss (d.1779), of Marley Mount, Salt Ponds, St Catherine's, J.P. for Port Royal, and Sarah Sandys. Digby's father was Johnathan Denniss (1700–1736) (or Dennis) a factor of the South Sea Company, later of Kingston, Jamaica, born in the parish of St. Helens, Bishopsgate, London. The family used a crest of a leopard's head erased proper with the armourials of Dennis of Gloucestershire, 3 leopards faces jessant-de-lys a bend engrailled overall, but differenced by omission of the bend. The family is likely to have descended from Sir Gilbert Denys (d.1422), of Siston, Gloucestershire, probably via Thomas Dennis (d.post 1603) of the City of Gloucester, 2nd. son of Sir Walter Denys (1501–1571) of Dyrham, Gloucestershire, whose extensive property holdings in that city (inherited from his wife's uncle Sir Thomas Bell the Elder (1486–1566), thrice mayor of Gloucester) were destroyed during the Civil War.

== Education ==
Edmund was educated at Christ's Hospital, Wren's and Hertford College, Oxford. He was elected Scholar in Natural Science at Sidney Sussex College, Cambridge, and compiled later in life Flora of Middlesex. He was a keen athlete at university, running the 100 yards in 10.25 seconds and being good at 200 yards, fair at 400 yards. He was a pioneer of British cycling, being an original member of the Dark Blue Bicycle Club at Oxford. He also participated in riding, swimming, boxing and fencing.

== Legal career ==
Denniss entered the Middle Temple, and was called to the Bar in 1879, when he joined the Northern Circuit. He was appointed KC on 25 October 1922. He was a Freeman of the City of London, a member of the London Court of Arbitration and of the London Chamber of Commerce and of the Chambers of Commerce of Oldham and Uxbridge.

== Political career ==
=== Local politics ===
Denniss was elected to Hendon Urban District Council, which he later served as chairman. Under his chairmanship a new main drainage system was installed in Hendon, which works he officially opened in presence of William Gladstone, who had taken an interest in the scheme. He was also a member of Middlesex County Council, representing Harrow-on-the-Hill.

=== National politics ===
In 1910 Denniss unsuccessfully stood as a Conservative (Unionist) for election to Parliament for Oldham, Lancashire, probably having been introduced to the constituency by his father-in-law who had served as Mayor of Oldham. However the next year in 1911 he won a remarkable by-election in the same constituency, and took his seat in the House of Commons. He spoke in many debates, especially those concerned with the Lancashire cotton industry. He was a member of the Commercial Committee of the House and of the Inter-Parliamentary Union. At the start of World War I he assisted the Chancellor of the Exchequer with the "Courts (Emergency Powers) Bill", and helped to set up the "Foreign Debts Scheme", which allowed British companies with debts due by enemy nations to obtain compensatory government financing. He retained the seat of Oldham until he stood down at the 1922 general election. He was Treasurer of the Air League of the British Empire, and a member of the Carlton, Conservative, 1900, Cecil, Unionist and Yorick Clubs.

== Freemasonry career ==
Denniss rose to the post of Grand Deacon of England. He was a Vice-President of the Royal Masonic Institution for Boys, a Life Governor of the Royal Masonic Institution for Girls, and the Royal Masonic Benevolent Institution and Vice-President of the Fund of Benevolence of the Grand Lodge of Mark Master Masons.

His career began with his initiation in the Thames Valley Lodge, no.1460, Hampton Court in 1888, where he was installed Master in 1893. He was a Founder, Past Master and Honorary Member of the Willesden Lodge, no.2489(1893); Founder and First Master, subsequently installed a 2nd time, of Herga Lodge, no. 2548, Harrow; Founder and Past Master of the Jubilee Masters Lodge, no.2712,(1898); Founder and First Master and an Honorary Member of the Yorick Lodge, no.2771 (1899); Founder of the Middlesex Masters Lodge, no.3420, Twickenham (1909); Past Master of the Burlington Lodge, no.96, and a Joining Member of the Northern Bar Lodge, no.1610, the Christ's Hospital Lodge, no.2650, the Empire Lodge, no. 2108; and the Abercorn Lodge, no.1549, Stanmore. He was a Consecrating Officer and Honorary Member of the Wembley Lodge, no.2914, Wembley(1902) and the King Alfred Lodge, no.2945, Edmonton (1903). He was an Honorary Member of the Unity Lodge, no.1637, Harrow. In 1896 he was invested as Provincial Grand Warden of Middlesex, and in 1902 was appointed Past Grand Deacon of England.

As a Royal Arch Mason he was exalted in the Royal Middlesex Chapter, no.1194, Hampton Court in 1893 in which he was twice installed as First Principal. He was a Founder and Past First Principal of the Willesden Chapter, no.2489(1895) and a Founder of the Inns of Court Chapter, no.1610(1905). He was a Past Provincial Third Grand Principal of Middlesex, and in 1902 was appointed Past Grand Standard Bearer of England, being promoted to the rank of Past Assistant Grand Sojourner in 1912.

In the Degree of Mark Master Mason he was advanced in the Royal Savoy Lodge, no.355, in which he was installed Master. In 1907 he was invested as Grand Steward of England.

In the Ancient and Accepted Rite (Scottish Rite) he was perfected in the Rose and Lily Rose Croix Chapter, no.97, in which he was installed as Sovereign. In 1909 he was admitted to the Chapter, no.97, in which he was installed as Sovereign. In 1909 he was admitted to the 30th Degree.

In the Allied Masonic Degrees he was a member of the Stewart Council, no 16, London.

== Marriage and Family ==
Denniss married Margaret Ellen Barlow(b. 1859) on 22 August 1877 at St Paul's Church, Kersal, Manchester. She was the da. of George Barlow, JP, Mayor of Oldham. Denniss resided c.1890 at Langton Lodge, Hendon, latterly at Belmont, Uxbridge, Middx., where he died on 20 March 1931. His 1919 photographic portrait by Bassano is in the collection of the National Portrait Gallery, London (NPG x83602). He had 8 children, 3 daughters and 5 sons, 3 of whom were killed in action:

=== 3 Sons Killed in Action ===
- George Barlow Bartley-Denniss(1878–1900) was born in Hendon, Middlesex in November 1878 and educated at Harrow School, where he was a mathematics scholar. He attended the Royal Military Academy, Woolwich and received his commission on 23 March 1898. During the Boer War On 16 September 1899, he sailed for South Africa aboard the Gaul, and the following week as 2nd Lt. joined the 23rd Field Co. Royal Engineers with whom he served during the Siege of Ladysmith which commenced on 2 November 1899. In the early hours of the morning of 6 January 1900, he was with a party of 33 sappers and NCOs of the Royal Engineers, under the command of Lt. Robert Digby-Jones, who were working on gun emplacements on Wagon Hill. They had installed a Navy 12-pounder, and were working on the mountings for a 4.7" gun, which was to have been brought up later in the day. In the pre-dawn darkness, Boer Commandos climbed the southern slopes and attacked both Wagon Hill and Caesar's Camp. During the morning the Imperial Light Horse made several charges in an attempt to clear the Boers from Wagon Hill, but the attempts were unsuccessful and costly. In the early afternoon a party of about 15-20 Boers charged the 4.7" gun emplacement. Lt. Digby-Jones and Trooper Herman Albrecht of the ILH led a counter charge, killing the leading Boer soldiers and halting the enemy advance. As he rallied his men, Lt. Digby-Jones was mortally shot in the throat. George Denniss went to his assistance and was himself shot in the head and killed. Both Digby-Jones and Albrecht were posthumously awarded Victoria Crosses.
- Henry Barlow Bartley-Denniss(1885–1913), Lt. Royal Navy, was granted a naval pension on 16/12/1912 for injuries. and died on 18/1/1913 at Belmont, Uxbridge, Middx.
- Thomas Vivian Bartley-Denniss(1891–1918), educated at Harrow and Sandhurst. As Major, Royal Sussex Regt., he was promoted in France to acting Lt. Col. Royal Berkshire Regt., and died of wounds on 28/8/1918 at the Military Hospital, Denmark Hill, London. His photograph was printed in The Sphere newspaper 28/9/1918.

== Surviving Son ==
Edmund's only surviving son was Lt. Col. Cyril Edmund Bartley-Denniss, DSO,(1883–1955) of the Royal Artillery, a tank specialist, of Eversley, Hants and Barnstaple, Devon. He was author of Index to Penfold's MS Sussex Pedigrees (1930). Cyril's eldest son, born at Barnstaple, Devon, was Col. George Arthur Bartley-Denniss(1916–1976), Royal Artillery, who was taken prisoner of war in World War II, and was approved by the King in 1946 to be "Mentioned in recognition of gallant and distinguished services while Prisoner of War".

== Sources ==
- Representative British Freemasons, published c. 1913–18, author unknown, biog. pp. 150–152.
- www.demornay.co.uk (Denniss family genealogy)
- Brown, Sharon Oddie, Descendants of George Bartley, 2003. (thesilverbowl.com)
- Historical List of MPs
- Debrett's House of Commons & the Judicial Bench, 1922

Parliament of the United Kingdom
Preceded by Alfred Emmott and Andrew Barton	Member of Parliament for Oldham; 1911–1922; With: William Barton	Succeeded by Sir Edward Grigg and William Tout
