= City College Manchester =

Further education college network in Manchester, England

Coordinates: 53°28′37″N 2°14′07″W

- Manchester, Greater Manchester; England

Information
- Type: Further Education and Higher Education
- Closed: August 2008
- Local authority: Manchester City Council
- Principal: Monica Box
- Gender: Mixed
- Merger: Merged with Manchester College of Arts and Technology in August 2008
- Successor: The Manchester College
- Website: ccm.ac.uk

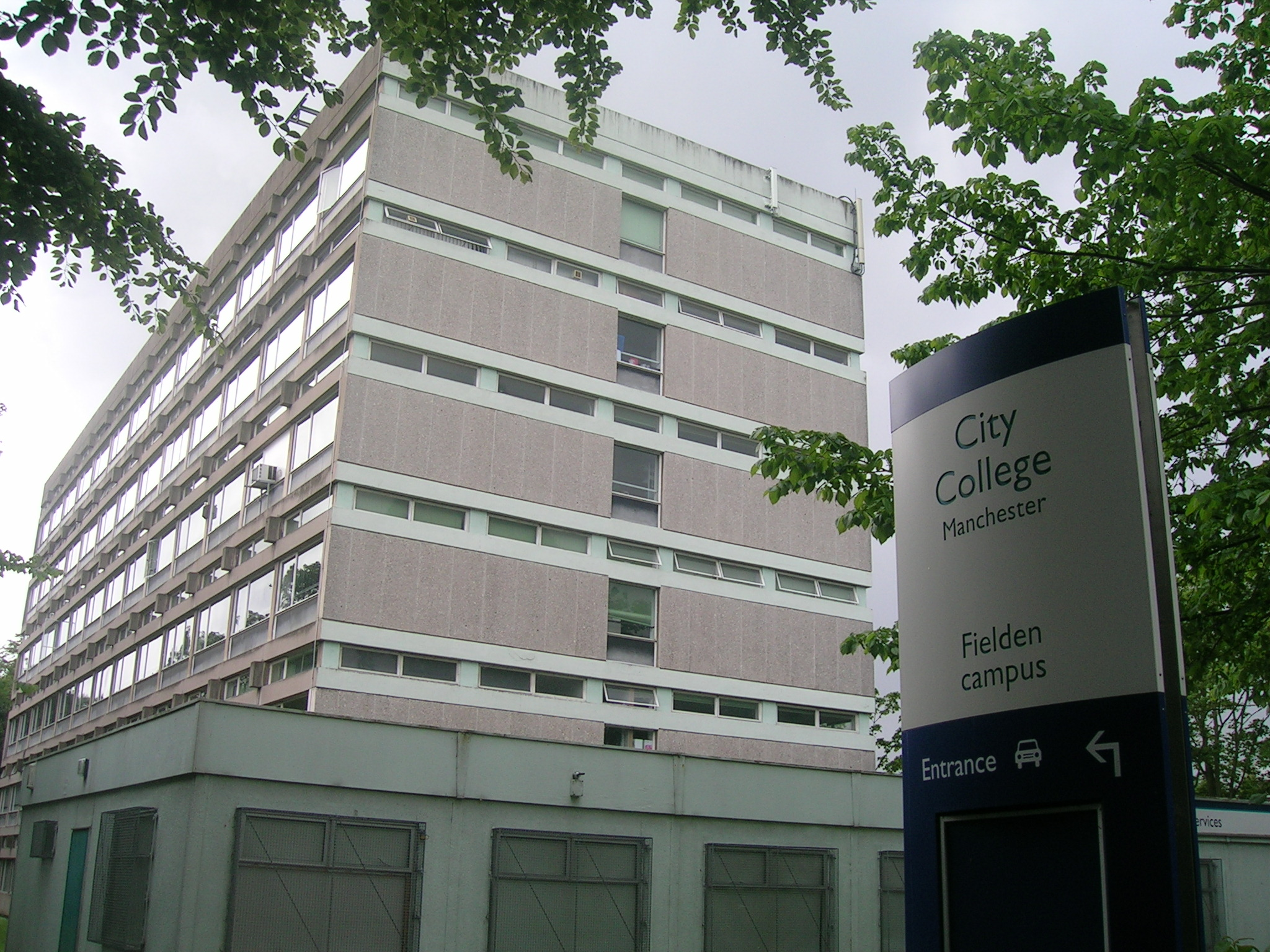
Fielden Campus, Didsbury

City College Manchester was a network of further education campuses in Manchester, England.

== History ==
The network was formed in the late 20th century when institutions in Central Manchester, Fielden Park, Arden and Wythenshawe merged to form City College Manchester. It was the largest provider of "Offender Learning" in the Greater Manchester region.

The college merged with Manchester College of Arts and Technology (MANCAT) to create an 80,000 student 'supercollege' known as The Manchester College in August 2008. The principal of MANCAT Peter Tavernor was appointed as head of The Manchester College.

== Campuses ==
City College had five campuses, the three main ones being Abraham Moss in Crumpsall, Northenden, and City Campus. Business courses were run at the smaller Fielden Campus in West Didsbury, and the college's Arden School of Theatre is in Ardwick. Courses for adults were run at the Wythenshawe Forum. The college had a large International Office in Manchester city centre.

== See also ==
- Shena Simon Campus
