= John Jewkes (economist) =

British economist (1902–1988)

John Jewkes, 1960s

John Jewkes (1902–1988) was a British classical liberal economist. He was Professor of Economic Organisation at Merton College, Oxford.

His main work, Ordeal by Planning, was written in 1946 and argued that the central planning implemented in the United Kingdom during World War II will lead to poverty if it is adopted as a permanent economic system, a thesis quite similar to the one developed by Friedrich Hayek in 1945 in The Road to Serfdom. His line of thought was close to the ordoliberal thesis of Wilhelm Röpke and Walter Eucken.

He is also remembered for his book The Sources of Invention (1958), written with two research assistants, David Sawers and Richard Stillerman. It is based on 50 case studies of 19th century and 20th century technological innovations and is considered a pioneering study in the economics of innovation.

He was president of the Mont Pelerin Society from 1962 to 1964.

== Bibliography ==
- John Jewkes; Allan Winterbottom (1933). An industrial survey of Cumberland and Furness: a study of the social implications of economic dislocation. Manchester University Press.
- John Jewkes; Allan Winterbottom (1933). Juvenile unemployment. G. Allen and Unwin ltd.
- John Jewkes; Edward Mayall Gray (1935). Wages and labour in the Lancashire cotton spinning industry. Manchester University Press.
- Ernest Darwin Simon; Shena Simon, Lady Simon of Wythenshawe; William Alexander Robson; John Jewkes (1937). Moscow in the making. Longmans, Green and co.
- John Jewkes, Sylvia Jewkes (1938). The Juvenile Labour Market. V. Gollancz.
- John Jewkes (1948). Ordeal by planning. Macmillan.
- John Jewkes (1958). The sources of invention. Macmillan.
- John Jewkes (1968). The new ordeal by planning: the experience of the Forties and the Sixties. Macmillan.
- John Jewkes (1978). A return to free market economics?: critical essays on government intervention. Macmillan. ISBN 0-333-23062-0.
