= Roger Simon, 2nd Baron Simon of Wythenshawe =

British solicitor and peer

The Right Honourable The Lord Simon of Wythenshawe

Secretary of the Labour Research Department
- In office 1965–1977

Personal details
- Born: 16 October 1913
- Died: 14 October 2002 (aged 88)
- Party: Labour
- Other political affiliations: Communist Party
- Spouse: Daphne May
- Children: The Hon. Margaret Simon; Matilda Simon, 3rd Baroness Simon of Wythenshawe
- Parent(s): Ernest Simon, 1st Baron Simon of Wythenshawe; Shena Potter
- Education: Gresham's School; Gonville and Caius College, Cambridge
- Profession: solicitor, journalist, activist

Roger Simon, 2nd Baron Simon of Wythenshawe (16 October 1913 – 14 October 2002) was a British solicitor and left wing journalist and political activist. He was one of the founders of the Campaign for Nuclear Disarmament.

The elder son of Ernest, first Lord Simon and Shena, Lady Simon, he inherited the title on his father's death in 1960.

After Gresham's School, Holt, Norfolk, where he was a contemporary of Benjamin Britten, Sir Alan Hodgkin, James Klugmann and Donald Maclean, Simon read economics at Gonville and Caius College, Cambridge. While there he was invited to join the Political Economy Club run by John Maynard Keynes. At one of the club's meetings, Piero Sraffa, a friend of Antonio Gramsci, advised him to read Karl Marx, and Simon later joined the Communist Party, as his brother Brian Simon had done earlier. Simon was influenced in this decision by meeting Emile Burns on the boat to the Soviet Union in 1936 - a trip with his parents.

In 1935, he qualified as a solicitor, and from 1942 to 1945 he served in the Royal Signals. He went for officer training at Catterick, where he met the Marxist Arnold Kettle, later a close friend.

From 1945 to 1946, he taught law at Welbeck Abbey, where soldiers with three years' service could have a month's free education. At Welbeck he met Edmund Penning-Rowsell, another communist who became a lifelong friend and fellow wine enthusiast.

From 1946 to 1958, he worked for Ealing Borough Council as a solicitor. He married Daphne May in 1951 and they had two children. He had a love of walking and often visited the Lake District.

In 1958 he joined the Labour Research Department, becoming secretary from 1965 to 1977 but continued doing work for the organisation until just before his death. He published many pamphlets and articles on economic issues. Within the Communist Party, where he sat on the Economic Committee, he strongly supported the "Eurocommunist" philosophy. He was also on the board of Lawrence and Wishart and encouraged the publication of "Selections from the Prison Notebooks of Antonio Gramsci" in 1971.

His last ten years were devoted to red-green politics.

He was a member of the William Morris Society.

He was succeeded by his daughter, Matilda Simon, as the Baron Simon of Wythenshawe.

== Publications ==
- Local Councils and the Citizen, Stevens & Sons (1948)
- The British State, Lawrence & Wishart (1958) (co-authored, under the pseudonyms James Harvey & Katherine Hood)
- Light on the City, LRD Publications (1962)
- An Introduction To Gramsci's Political Thought (1982)
- William Morris Now - Socialism by Design, Communist Party (1984)
- Introducing Marxism, Communist Party (1986)

Peerage of the United Kingdom
Preceded by Ernest Darwin Simon	Baron Simon of Wythenshawe; 1960–2002	Succeeded by Matilda Simon
