= Mary Emmott =

British political activist

Mary Gertrude Emmott
- Born: Mary Gertrude Lees; 28 April 1866; Waterhead Mill, Lancashire (now Greater Manchester), England
- Died: 16 November 1954 (aged 88)
- Family: Alfred Emmott, 1st Baron Emmott (husband)
- Awards: Queen Elisabeth Medal

Mary Gertrude Emmott, Baroness Emmott of Oldham JP (28 April 1866 – 16 November 1954) was a British political activist.

== Life ==
Emmott was born Mary Gertrude Lees in Waterhead Mill, Oldham, Lancashire (now part of Greater Manchester), and studied at Queen's College, London. She married Alfred Emmott, a local Liberal Party councillor on 5 October 1887; they had two children. She became involved in liberal politics, was a founder member of the local branch of the National Society for the Prevention of Cruelty to Children, and the main founder of a local branch of the National Union of Women Workers (NUWW).

In 1898, Emmott was elected to the Oldham Board of Guardians, becoming its first female member. The following year, Alfred was elected as a Member of Parliament, and the couple relocated to London. There, she became a vice-chair of the national Women's Liberal Federation, served on the executive of the London Society for Women's Suffrage, and chaired the NUWW's Parliamentary and Legislation Committee. In 1911, Alfred was raised to the peerage, Mary thereby becoming Baroness Emmott. She was appointed a Justice of the Peace.

During World War I, Emmott spent her time supporting Belgian refugees and, as a result, received the Queen Elisabeth Medal. At the 1922 United Kingdom general election, she stood for the Oldham seat herself, but took a distant fifth place.

In 1932-33, she served on a Royal Commission investigating the regulation of gambling. She remained active on the committees of many organisations, principally feminist and women's groups, for the remainder of her life, and was serving as the president of the Fawcett Society in 1954, when she died.
