= Caroline Benn =

British educationalist and writer (1926–2000)

- Born: Caroline Middleton DeCamp; 13 October 1926; Cincinnati, Ohio, U.S.
- Died: 22 November 2000 (aged 74); Hammersmith, London, England
- Citizenship: United States; United Kingdom
- Education: Vassar College; University of Cincinnati; Oxford University; University College London
- Known for: Author, educationalist
- Title: Viscountess Stansgate
- Board member of: Inner London Education Authority; Imperial College London; Holland Park School; Socialist Education Association
- Spouse: Tony Benn (m. 1949)
- Children: Stephen; Hilary; Melissa; Joshua
- Relatives: Emily Benn (granddaughter)

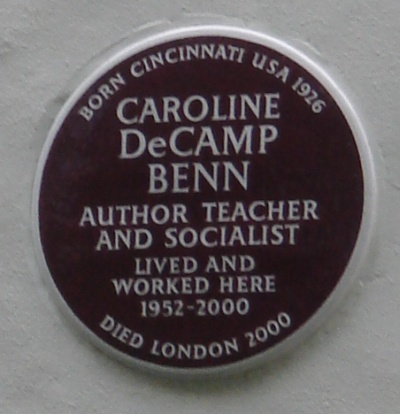
Brown plaque, Holland Park Avenue, London

Caroline Middleton Benn (née DeCamp; 13 October 1926 – 22 November 2000), formerly Viscountess Stansgate, was an American-born British educationalist and writer, and the wife of Labour politician Tony Benn (formerly 2nd Viscount Stansgate).

== Biography ==
Benn was born Caroline Middleton DeCamp on 13 October 1926, in Cincinnati, Ohio, United States, the eldest daughter of Anne Hetherington (née Graydon) and James Milton DeCamp, a Cincinnati lawyer.

Educated at Vassar College (AB, 1946) and the University of Cincinnati (BA, 1948), she travelled to the United Kingdom in 1948 to study at Oxford University and voted for Henry Wallace, the Progressive Party candidate in that year's American Presidential election. She earned an English MA on Jacobean drama (specifically on the masques of Inigo Jones) at University College London in 1951.

She met Tony Benn over tea at Worcester College, Oxford, in 1948, and just nine days later he proposed to her on a park bench in the city. Later, he bought the bench from Oxford City Council and installed it in the garden of their house in Holland Park, London. In June 1999, on their golden wedding anniversary, she put on the red striped dress she had worn that night. The couple had four children: Stephen, Hilary, Melissa, and Joshua, and ten grandchildren.

She devoted her life to comprehensive education and was co-founder of the Campaign for Comprehensive Education. She sent her own children to Holland Park School, one of the first comprehensive schools in the country. In 1970, she co-wrote with Professor Brian Simon the report Halfway There, the definitive study of the progress of comprehensive reform in the UK. This was followed up in 1997 with Thirty Years On, which she wrote together with Professor Clyde Chitty.

As well as writing extensively about education, Benn held a number of other positions: she was a member of the Inner London Education Authority (ILEA) from 1970 to 1977, an ILEA Governor at Imperial College London, a tutor at the Open University, a lecturer at Kensington and Hammersmith Further Education College from 1970 to 1996, a governor of Holland Park School for thirty-five years (serving from 1971 to 1983 as Chair, under the headship of Derek Rushworth), and president of the Socialist Education Association.

Benn played a significant role in her husband's political career, earning popularity among his colleagues, who respected her views, which were often more radical than Benn's. She is personally credited with having suggested the title of the Labour Party manifesto for the 1964 general election. She proposed The New Britain, and it eventually became Let's Go With Labour for the New Britain.

In 1964, she was secretary of the Who Killed Kennedy? Committee set up by Bertrand Russell.

== Death ==
Benn was diagnosed with breast cancer in June 1996, having been unwell for about a year, but fought the illness for several further years. She became increasingly frail during 2000, having developed spinal metastases, and died at Charing Cross Hospital, London, on 22 November 2000, aged 74.

== Tributes ==
Speaking of life with his wife, Tony Benn was reported as saying in 2001:

She was my socialist soulmate. When people went through our rubbish every day, it was harder for her. I could respond in the House, she just had to take it.

A book titled A Tribute to Caroline Benn: Education and Democracy, edited by her daughter Melissa Benn and Clyde Chitty, was published in 2004, featuring essays in celebration of her life and her commitment to working for educational reform, with a diverse range of contributors alongside the editors, including Roy Hattersley, Brian Simon, Geoff Whitty, Chris Searle, in addition to Tony Benn.

== Publications ==
- Comprehensive School Reform and the 1945 Labour Government (1980), History Workshop Journal
- Lion in a Den of Daniels (1962), a novel
- Halfway There: Report on the British Comprehensive School Reform (1970), with Professor Brian Simon
- Higher Education For Everyone (1982)
- Keir Hardie: A Biography (1992)
- Thirty Years On (1997), with Professor Clyde Chitty
