= Shena Simon Campus =

Performing arts and music campus of The Manchester College

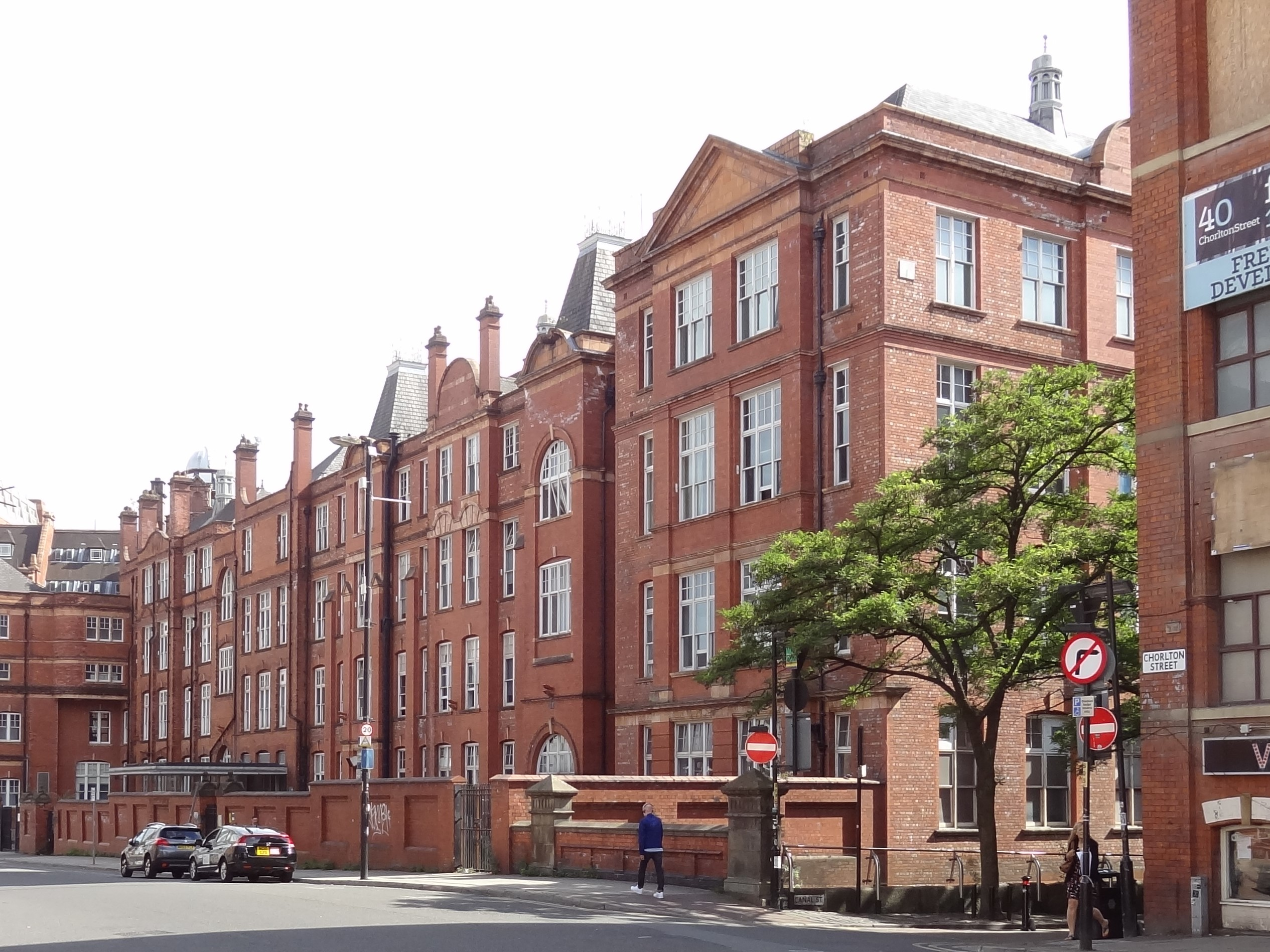
- The building in 2018

- Location within Greater Manchester
- 53°28′38″N 2°14′17″W
- Location: Whitworth Street, Manchester

History
- Built: 1901

Site notes
- Architectural style: French Renaissance style

Listed Building – Grade II
- Designated: 6 June 1994
- Reference no.: 1270607

The Shena Simon Campus, formerly the Central High School and the Shena Simon Sixth Form College, is an educational facility on Whitworth Street, Manchester, England. It is a Grade II listed building.

== History ==
The building was designed by Potts Son and Hennings and was officially opened by the Duke of Devonshire as the Central Higher Grade School in 1901. During the First World War, the building was requisitioned by the War Office to create the 2nd Western General Hospital, a facility for the Royal Army Medical Corps to treat military casualties.

It became the Central High School in 1920, the Central High School for Boys in 1960 and then the Shena Simon Sixth Form College (named after Shena Simon, Baroness Simon of Wythenshawe, the politician, feminist, educationalist and writer) in 1982. It was absorbed into City College Manchester in 2001 and became a campus of The Manchester College in 2008.

In May 2025, the entrepreneur, Oliver Cookson, acquired the building and announced proposals to convert it into a hotel. The Manchester College relocated its educational services from Shena Simon to a new building at the college's City Campus on Great Ducie Street in September 2025.

== Alumni ==
=== Central High School for Girls ===
- Carol Birch, novelist, lecturer and book critic
- Arlene Phillips CBE, choreographer, theatre director and talent scout, known for Strictly Come Dancing
- Vivian Tierney, operatic soprano, married to Canadian operatic tenor Alan Woodrow

== See also ==
- Manchester Central High School for Boys
