= Robin Pedley =

British educationist (1914–1988)

Robin Pedley (11 August 1914 – 20 November 1988) was a British educationist whose publication laid much of the foundations of comprehensive education in the United Kingdom.

== Early life ==
He was born Robert Pedley to Edward Pedley, stonemason, and wife Martha, a postmistress; he was the third of four sons and a daughter. He was raised in Grinton, near Reeth, in the then North Riding of Yorkshire, and went to the local Fremington School. and then Reeth Friends School under head teacher Reginald Place. He was a pupil teacher until the system was abolished in 1928.

Pedley won an Ellerton Scholarship to Durham University, where he graduated with an upper-second in History and Economics in 1935. He gained his teaching certificate the following year, followed by a doctorate in 1939, on the political and economic history of the northern Pennines.

== Career ==
From 1936 to 1938 he was a research fellow at the University of Durham. In 1937 he won the Gladstone Prize for Modern History and, in the same year, the Gibson Prize for Archaeology. From 1938 to 1942 he taught History at Great Ayton Friends' School, a Quaker independent boarding school. During the Second World War he was a conscientious objector. From 1946 to 1947 he taught Education at the College of St Mark & St John in London, now the University of St Mark & St John.

=== University of Leicester ===
From 1947 to 1963 he worked in the Department of Education at the University of Leicester.

At Leicester he began to develop his ideas on comprehensive schools, which he had visited from the early 1950s. By 1963 there were 175 comprehensive schools in England; around 5% of secondary schools. He believed, as did some others later on, that comprehensive schools helped social integration, and helped underprivileged children. He believed the grammar school system led to segregated education. He believed in small schools in intimate communities, and did not like all-through schools from ages 11 to 19. He preferred two stages of secondary schools, from ages 11 to 15, then ages 15 to 19.

=== University of Exeter ===
From 1963 to 1971 he was director of the Institute of Education at the University of Exeter, becoming a professor in 1970.

=== University of Southampton ===
From 1971 to 1975 he was head of the School of Education and dean of the Faculty of Education at the University of Southampton.

== Publications ==
- Comprehensive Schools Today, 1955
- Comprehensive Education: a new approach, 1956
- The Comprehensive School, 1963 (3rd edition, 1978), Pelican Books; his most influential book, greatly popularising the idea of comprehensive schools.
- The Comprehensive School, 1966
- Towards the Comprehensive University, 1977

== Personal life ==
He married in Leicester in 1951 and had two children. In his later life Pedley lived at Brockenhurst, Hampshire. He died aged 74 in Wiltshire.

== See also ==
- Sir Graham Savage, advocate of comprehensive schools in the 1920s
