= William Barton (British politician) =

British politician (1862–1957)

Sir William Barton

Sir Andrew William Barton (5 August 1862 – 9 July 1957) was a British Liberal politician and businessman.

== Family ==
Barton was born on 5 August 1862 near Glasgow, the son of Robert Barton, a mining engineer from Hamilton, South Lanarkshire, and his wife Annie (née Gray). In 1895, he married Jessie Cuthbertson, the daughter of James Boyd a Manchester merchant. They had one daughter. Jessie Barton died in 1915 and Barton married again in 1918. His second wife was Olive Ruth Bryson who had been Matron of the Balmoral Red Cross Hospital in Flanders. They too had one daughter. In religion Barton was a Presbyterian.

== Education ==
Barton was educated at the High School of Glasgow, among whose most notable former pupils were Liberal prime minister Sir Henry Campbell-Bannerman and Conservative prime minister and Liberal Coalition partner, Bonar Law . He later graduated from the University of Glasgow where he specialized in commercial law, political economy and modern languages. Typically for his time, Barton later promoted education and self-improvement by becoming a director of the Manchester Athenaeum, an institution founded in 1835 and devoted to the arts and learning and one of whose founding fathers was Richard Cobden.

== Career ==
After university Barton went into the textile industry in Glasgow where he learned the trade of calico printing and he later established a calico printing business of his own in Manchester.

== Politics ==
=== Into Parliament ===
Barton learned his political trade on Manchester City Council where he was an elected councillor between 1906 and 1909. In 1909 one of the two Members of Parliament for Oldham, J A Bright the son of the great Liberal reformer John Bright decided to stand down at the next election and Barton was selected to replace him as candidate. The next election came in January 1910 and Barton was comfortably elected as Oldham's second Liberal member alongside Alfred Emmott the Deputy Speaker of the House of Commons who had held his seat since a by-election in 1899, when one of the defeated Conservative candidates was Winston Churchill.

Barton had a majority of 5,378 votes over his nearest Conservative rival in January 1910. He held the seat at the December 1910 election with a reduced but still substantial majority of 3,501 with Emmott again winning the other seat.

=== Rupture with Oldham Liberals ===
However, in 1913 Barton had a falling out with his local party in Oldham, although he continued to describe himself as a Liberal and notified the press that he did not intend to stand down as a Member of Parliament. The issue which caused his break with his local Liberal Association erupted in December 1913 when he presided over a meeting in Oldham addressed by Liberal prime minister H H Asquith. In view of the recent arrest of suffragette leader Emmeline Pankhurst there was a high level of security for the meeting, which was one of three events in Lancashire at which Asquith was speaking. The issue which incensed Barton was the refusal of Oldham Liberals, without letting him know in advance, to admit any women to the prime minister's meeting except certain ladies in the platform parties of Lord Sheffield and Alfred Emmott. This included refusing admission to a delegation of Liberal women who had been active in support of Barton and the Liberal Party in the constituency and who had been asked by Barton to attend.

=== Votes for Women ===
The rupture appears to have been over what Barton regarded as a lack of courtesy to him and the women Liberals who worked for him politically rather than on any matter of policy associated with the issue of women's suffrage itself. Barton supported votes for women. In 1911 he is recorded as having voted for woman suffrage in the House of Commons, although he also voted in protest at the growing campaign of so-called organized rowdyism which the suffragettes were waging as likely to hinder the passing of favourable legislation. In 1912 and again in 1914 he was invited to speak at the annual demonstration at the Albert Hall organised by the National Union of Women's Suffrage Societies. At the 1914 meeting Millicent Fawcett moved a resolution condemning Asquith for refusing to meet a delegation of any of the large number of male supporters of women's suffrage who had come to London for the event and this was seconded by Barton who nevertheless told the rally that he thought of himself as a supporter of the prime minister and refused to regard Asquith as 'a hopeless case' on the issue, although he clearly was.

=== Asquith and Lloyd George ===
Barton's relationship with Asquith blew hot and cold over the course of many years. During the First World War, Barton decided to support David Lloyd George after he replaced Asquith as prime minister in 1916. In 1917, Barton was rewarded with a knighthood in the King's Birthday Honours List. At the 1918 general election Barton seems to have received the Coalition Coupon as he stood as a Coalition Liberal in Oldham in that contest. He was elected, as was a Coalition Conservative candidate, against Labour and Asquithian Liberal opposition with a majority of 11,076 votes. Clearly Barton's little local difficulty with his constituency Liberal Association had not been resolved given that they were prepared to put up a Wee Free candidate against him. Barton was not very forgiving as he told a colleague that his Asquithian opponent Walter Rea, a former Junior Lord of the Treasury in the Asquith administration, 'counted for nothing' and that he was all for teaching the local Liberal Association its place. The only thing that mattered in the election was supporting Lloyd George, the hero of the war.

By 1921 however the troubles of a divided Liberal Party were impinging more pressingly on Barton's political consciousness and he was now less firmly in the Lloyd George camp. He was still reluctant to re-commit to Asquith observing: "I am not keen on joining Asquith, who seems to me in misfortune." But by the following year he was more kindly disposed telling the Manchester Guardian that Asquith expressed the "true Liberal position".

In 1922 Barton chose not to defend his Oldham seat at the general election of that year. Instead he stood as Liberal candidate for Manchester Exchange, a safe Unionist seat. He finished a respectable second. He did not stand for parliament again.

== Other appointments ==
Barton was a Justice of the Peace for the County of Lancaster, a Fellow of the Royal Society of Arts and sometime vice-president of the British Cotton Growers Association.

Parliament of the United Kingdom
| Preceded by Alfred Emmott; John Albert Bright | Member of Parliament for Oldham; January 1910–1922; With: Alfred Emmott 1910–1911; Edmund Bartley-Denniss 1911–1922 | Succeeded by Sir Edward Grigg and William Tout |
