= Baron Simon of Wythenshawe =

Barony in the Peerage of the United Kingdom

Baron Simon of Wythenshawe, of Didsbury in the City of Manchester, is a title in the Peerage of the United Kingdom. It was created in 1947 for Ernest Simon, an industrialist and politician, and his heirs male. He had previously served as a member of the Manchester City Council and as Lord Mayor of Manchester and is chiefly remembered for the slum clearances and housing projects he initiated in the city, notably the Wythenshawe estate. Simon also sat as a Liberal Member of Parliament for Manchester Withington, but joined the Labour Party in 1946. As of 2022 the title is held by his granddaughter Matilda Simon, the third Baron, who succeeded her father in 2002 (while still designated male), and came out in 2015 as the first openly transgender peer in the United Kingdom.

== Barons Simon of Wythenshawe (1947) ==
- Ernest Emil Darwin Simon, 1st Baron Simon of Wythenshawe (1879–1960)
- Roger Simon, 2nd Baron Simon of Wythenshawe (1913–2002)
- Matilda Simon, 3rd Baroness Simon of Wythenshawe (b. 1955) alternatively styled Lady Simon of Wythenshawe.

The heir presumptive is the present holder's first cousin once removed Michael Simon (b. 1970).
