= The Manchester College =

Coordinates: 53.473221°N 2.187825°W

Location
- City Campus, 60 Great Ducie St; Manchester, Greater Manchester, M3 1LT; England

Information
- Type: Further Education, higher education
- Motto: "Careers not Courses"
- Established: 2008
- Local authority: Manchester City Council
- Chair of Governors: Dame Ann Limb
- Principal: Rachel Curry
- Staff: 3,158 (LTE Group)
- Gender: Mixed
- Age: 16 to Adult
- Enrolment: 12,588
- Ofsted Report Result: "Good"
- Website: tmc.ac.uk

The Manchester College is the largest further education college in the United Kingdom and the largest single provider of 16–19, adult and higher education in Greater Manchester, with more than 25% of Greater Manchester's learning provision undertaken by the college.

It is currently rated "Good" across all areas by Ofsted and ranked the number one provider of 16–19 and adult education in Greater Manchester.

== History ==
The origins of the college go back to the early 19th century St. John's Sunday school, a pioneering school for workers. By the 1950s this had evolved into St John's and Openshaw Technical College.

Later mergers created the Central College Manchester which became Manchester College of Arts and Technology in Manchester, while institutions in Central Manchester, Fielden Park, Arden and Wythenshawe merged to form City College Manchester.

In 2008 these two combined to form The Manchester College.

In 2018 The Manchester College split its higher education provision, creating UCEN Manchester as an alternative higher education provider. UCEN Manchester delivers its performing arts courses under The Arden brand and also incorporates the Manchester Film School.

The college is part of the LTE Group, the UK's largest social enterprise specialising in education, alongside UCEN Manchester, apprenticeship provider Total People, prison education provider Novus and professional development provider MOL.

In July 2021, The Manchester College was awarded the NNECL Quality Mark for the inclusion and success of care experienced students.

In November 2021, The Manchester College was awarded the Queen's Anniversary Prize in recognition of the positive impact and benefits it delivers to Greater Manchester through education and training, centred on its 'Careers not Courses' ethos, which focuses on linking students' technical education with a future career and ensuring that they acquire all the skills they will require for future employment.

A number of the college's staff have been recognised for their contributions to education. In September 2021, Vice Principal Marie Stock was awarded an MBE for her services to education. In June 2022, Chair of Governors Dame Ann Limb was appointed Dame Commander of the British Empire for services to young people and philanthropy. In December 2023, former Deputy Principal Christine Kenyon was also awarded an MBE for services to further education.

== Courses ==
The Manchester College provides a range of Level 1–4 courses for 16–19-year-olds and via ten Industry Excellence Academies and 19 Centres of Excellence. Courses are co-created and co-delivered with a range of industry partners, with around 4,500 work experience opportunities provided for students per year.

In September 2021, The Manchester College was one of the colleges chosen to offer new T Levels in Construction; Digital; Education & Childcare; and Health & Healthcare Science. The College also now offers T Levels in a further five areas including Finance, Engineering and Manufacturing.

The Manchester College's Centre of Excellence for Adult Education offers adult and professional courses in 20 subject areas, from Entry Level to Level 6.

== Campuses ==
The Manchester College currently has seven campuses across the city, comprising classrooms, lecture theatres and a wide range of practical workshops, performance and rehearsal rooms, along with tutorial and specialist learning spaces.

=== Locations ===
- City Campus Manchester (Opened 2022) Being extended and complete by 2025
- Shena Simon Campus
- Nicholls
- Centre of Excellence for Medical Sciences
- Openshaw
- Harpurhey
- Wythenshawe

In September 2016, LTE Group agreed to consolidate its estate for The Manchester College and UCEN Manchester to seven estates.

Phase One of the Estates Strategy saw a £139m investment into Manchester's education provision, funded by LTE Group, Greater Manchester Combined Authority, Local Enterprise Partnership and Manchester City Council.

This included the construction of a new £93m campus in Manchester city centre, City Campus, next to the Manchester Arena and Manchester Victoria station.

The campus opened its doors to the first students in September 2022, providing Industry Excellence Academies and Centres of Excellence for Computing and Digital; Creative and Digital Media; Hospitality and Catering; Music; and Theatrical and Media Make-up and; Performing Arts and Design, music and Virtual Arts.

Phase One also included the £25m redevelopment of the college's Openshaw campus. Opening in September 2021, the renovated campus includes College's Industry Excellence Academies and Centres of Excellence for Construction and Engineering; Health and Social Care; Childhood Studies and Sport.

The Northenden campus based in Wythenshawe was closed in September 2022 to make way for new housing.

In 2024, the Nicholls campus would become the new setting for Waterloo Road from Series 14 to Series 17.

== Notable alumni ==
- Anna Chell
- Johnny Marr
- Brooke Vincent
- Matt Greenwood
- Theo Graham
- Carlos Mendes Gomes
- Yasmin Finney
