= David Reeder =

British historian (1931-2005)

David A Reeder (5 May 1931 – 1 August 2005) was an English historian who specialised in urban history and the history of education. He was associated with the University of Leicester for more than 50 years, and co-founded the Urban History Group.

Reeder was born in Kingston upon Hull, the son of a railway fireman, and evacuated to Rawcliffe and then York during World War II.

Reeder was educated at Nunthorpe Grammar School and won a scholarship to the University of Durham, where he served as Editor of Palatinate.

== Selected publications ==
- Reeder, David A., ed. (1977). Urban Education in the Nineteenth Century. Taylor & Francis. ISBN 9780850661262.
- Combe, George (1980). Reeder, David A. (ed.). Educating Our Masters: Addresses and Essays. Leicester University Press. ISBN 9780718550363.
- Dyos, H. J. (1982). Cannadine, David; Reeder, David (eds.). Exploring the Urban Past: Essays in Urban History. Cambridge University Press. ISBN 9780521288484.
