= Shena Simon, Baroness Simon of Wythenshawe =

English politician, feminist, educationalist and writer

The Right Honourable The Lady Simon of Wythenshawe
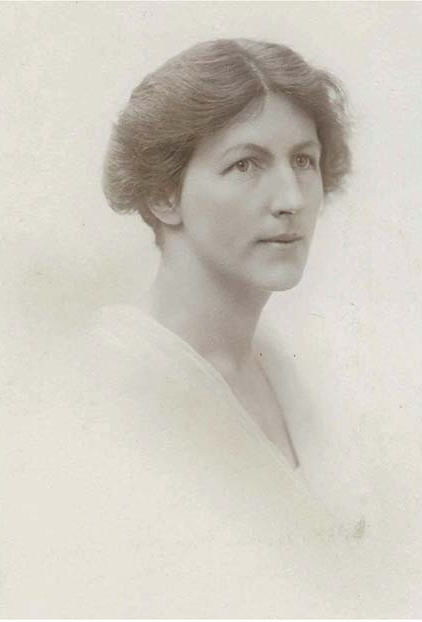
- Shena Simon c.1920

Member of the Manchester City Council
- In office 1924–1933

Lady Mayoress of Manchester
- In office 1921–1922
- Lord Mayor: Ernest Simon

Personal details
- Born: Shena Dorothy Potter; 21 October 1883 Croydon, England
- Died: 17 July 1972 (aged 88) Manchester, England
- Party: Labour
- Spouse: Ernest Simon, 1st Baron Simon of Wythenshawe
- Children: 3, including Roger Simon, 2nd Baron Simon of Wythenshawe and Brian Simon
- Occupation: Politician; feminist; educationalist; writer

Shena Dorothy Simon, Baroness Simon of Wythenshawe (née Potter; 21 October 1883 – 17 July 1972), was an English politician, feminist, educationalist and writer. She was Lady Mayoress of Manchester, during her husband's term as Lord Mayor, from 1921 to 1922. From 1924 to 1933, Lady Simon served on the Manchester City Council. She was the founder of the Women Citizens' Association in Manchester.

== Early years ==
Shena Dorothy Potter was born on 21 October 1883, daughter of John Wilson Potter and Jane Boyd Potter. She had a privileged upbringing in a liberal, upper-middle-class family. Although she studied at Newnham College, Cambridge and then the London School of Economics, she was not granted a formal degree since the University of Cambridge did not grant full membership to women until 1946. She received an Ad eundem degree from Trinity College Dublin as a 'Steamboat lady'.

In 1911 Shena Potter became secretary of a committee for safeguarding women's rights under David Lloyd George's National Insurance Act 1911. She was introduced to Ernest Simon by Sydney and Beatrice Webb, who thought she would make an ideal wife for him. Ernest was the son of Henry Gustav Simon, a wealthy Victorian industrialist. Shena married him in 1912, and they had two sons, Roger and Brian, and a daughter, Antonia.

== Career ==
Simon founded the Women Citizens' Association in Manchester, a local branch of the National Women Citizens' Association. Her husband was Lord Mayor of Manchester from 1921 to 1922. As Lady Mayoress, Simon caused a stir by refusing to attend a function at St Mary's Hospital for Women because there were no women on the Board or among the medical staff. Shena Simon was a member of the Manchester City Council from 1924 to 1933, when she was voted out by the Conservatives. She was a member of the Royal Committee on Licensing in 1929 and a member of the Manchester Estate Council from 1931 to 1933.

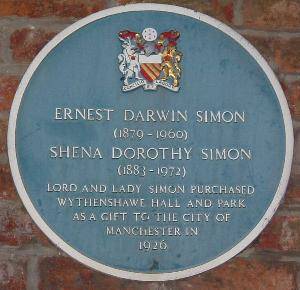
Blue Plaque

In 1926, Shena and Ernest Simon donated the Wythenshawe Park to the city of Manchester for use of the people living on the Wythenshawe estate. She felt that parks were important, and later was to observe that there was a severe shortage of such open space in Manchester. She devoted much energy to planning the Wythenshawe housing estate, but her recommendations were not always practical. For example, she fought for glazing bars in windows since they would make the housing more cottage-like in appearance, although the windows would be harder to clean. She accepted the conventional division of labour between men and women, at least for the working classes, where the woman minded the home.

She became Chairperson of the Education Committee 1932–1933. From 1933 she was actively involved in the Spens Report on secondary education reform, serving as a representative of the Local Education Authorities. On the committee she argued forcefully for abolition of fees in secondary schools, although she could not always get her way. In 1933 Simon, her husband and Eva Marian Hubback co-founded the Association for Education in Citizenship.

Her husband was knighted in 1932. He became chairman of the council of Victoria University of Manchester in 1939, was a sponsor of construction of the Jodrell Bank Observatory, and from 1947 to 1952 was chairman of the BBC. Lady Simon became a member of the Labour Party in 1935, and was appointed to the Departmental Committee on Valuation of Dwelling Houses in 1938. She was Chair of the Further Education Sub-Committee for seven years. In 1946 she became Chair of the Education Advisory Committee of the Workers Educational Associations. In 1964 she was made a freeman of the city. Speaking at that occasion, she said:

"Happiness, a much more fundamental conception than mere enjoyment or pleasure, depends upon the existence of life and liberty, but it cannot be pursued by the individual unless he has had a chance to develop, first as a child, and then as an adult, all his interests and faculties, varied as they are between each member of society. I do not for a moment suggest that we are even yet in sight of that goal, but that it must be our "guiding light" has been my belief for the forty years that I have been a member of the Education Committee".

Shena Simon died on 17 July 1972. The Shena Simon Campus of The Manchester College is named after her.

== Publications ==
Shena Simon was co-author with her husband Ernest Simon, William Alexander Robson and John Jewkes of the 1937 book Moscow in the Making. In 1939 Shena Simon published her book A Hundred Years of City Government, Manchester 1838–1938. She was also the author of several pamphlets on education. For example, in 1944 she published The four freedoms in secondary education. The Fabian Society published her pamphlet on The Education Act, 1944,: Provisions and possibilities in 1945. Her pamphlet Three Schools or One? (1948) called for establishment of multilateral or comprehensive schools.
