= Ernest Simon, 1st Baron Simon of Wythenshawe =

British industrialist, politician and public servant

The Right Honourable The Lord Simon of Wythenshawe
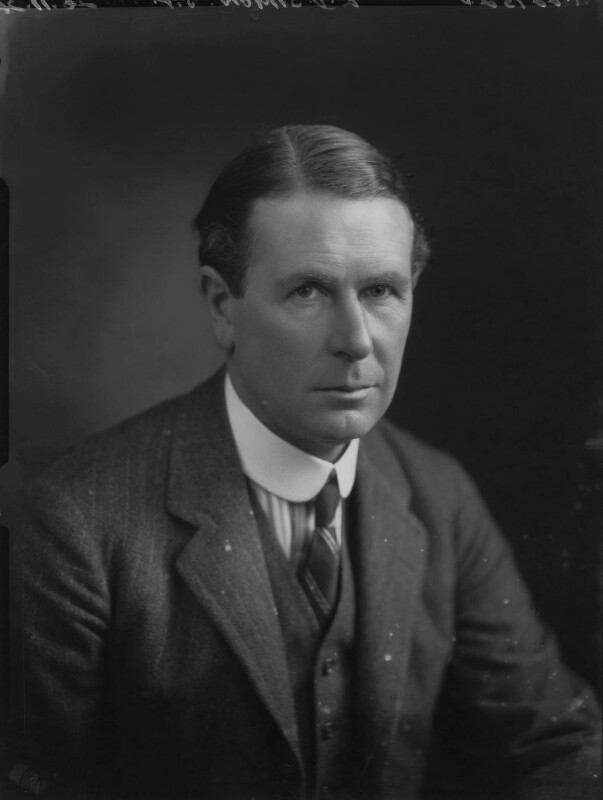

Chairman of the BBC Board of Governors
- In office 1947–1952
- Preceded by: Philip Inman
- Succeeded by: Alexander Cadogan

Lord Mayor of Manchester
- In office 1921–1922

Manchester City Council Member
- In office 1912–1925

Personal details
- Born: Ernest Emil Darwin Simon; 9 October 1879 Didsbury, Manchester, England
- Died: 3 October 1960 (aged 80) Withington, Manchester, England
- Party: Labour (from 1946); Liberal (prior to the 1940s)
- Spouse: Shena Dorothy Potter (m. 1912)
- Children: Roger Simon; Brian Simon
- Education: Pembroke College, Cambridge
- Profession: Industrialist, politician and public servant

Ernest Emil Darwin Simon, 1st Baron Simon of Wythenshawe (9 October 1879 – 3 October 1960) was a British industrialist, politician and public servant. Lord Mayor of Manchester in 1921–1922, he was a member of parliament for two terms between 1923 and 1931 before being elevated to the peerage and serving as the Chairman of the BBC Board of Governors.

== Early life and family ==
Simon was born in Didsbury, Manchester, as the eldest son of Henry Gustav Simon and Emily Stoehr. He was educated at Rugby School and studied mechanical sciences at Pembroke College, Cambridge.

In 1912 he married Shena Dorothy Potter (1883–1972), a noted social reformer. They had three children: Roger, a solicitor and journalist; Brian, an educationalist and historian; and a daughter Antonia (Tony) who died in childhood. C. G. H. Simon was his nephew.

== Engineering ==
After leaving Cambridge on the death of his father, he entered the family's engineering business, Simon Carves, manufacturers of flour milling machinery and coke ovens. He successfully expanded the company into building grain silos, and with the wealth generated by the business pursued outside interests, including politics.

== Political and public life ==
Simon served as a member of Manchester City Council from 1912 to 1925, and as Lord Mayor of Manchester in 1921–1922, still the youngest person to have held the office. He is chiefly remembered for the slum clearances and housing projects he initiated in the city. He purchased Wythenshawe Hall and park from Robert Henry Grenville Tatton in 1926 and donated them to the city; the estate farmland became one on Britain's largest housing estates, Wythenshawe.

Simon sat as a Liberal Member of Parliament for Manchester Withington from 1923 to 1924 and from 1929 to 1931. Appointed a Parliamentary Secretary to the Ministry of Health in August 1931, to remain in office he contested Penryn and Falmouth (he had previously decided not to contest the Withington seat again) in October 1931, however he was unsuccessful. He was knighted in 1932. After the Second World War he again stood for parliament, as an independent candidate for the Combined English Universities seat during the 1946 by-election. He was unsuccessful and later that year joined the Labour Party. In 1947 he was raised to the peerage as Baron Simon of Wythenshawe, of Didsbury in the City of Manchester, and he was appointed chairman of the BBC Board of Governors, a post which he held until 1952.

He was close friends with Sidney and Beatrice Webb, and he contributed £1000 towards their establishment of the New Statesman political newspaper in 1913.

In 1915 He was elected to membership of the Manchester Literary and Philosophical Society. In 1950 described as Lord Simon of Wythenshawe, Broomcroft, Ford Lane, Didsbury, Manchester, 2.

He also had long association with the Victoria University of Manchester; except for a short period, he was a member of the court and council from 1915 until his death, and he served as chairman of the Council between 1941 and 1957.

== Death and legacy ==
Simon died on 3 October 1960 in Withington, Manchester, after suffering a stroke whilst on holiday. His eldest son Roger succeeded to the barony.

Wythenshawe Garden City was incorporated into the City of Manchester in 1931 and rapidly became established as the largest council housing estate in Europe. Today, a blue plaque on Wythenshawe Hall commemorates the Simons' gift of land. A major road through the centre of Wythenshawe is named Simonsway after Ernest and Shena Simon. In Manchester City Centre, the Simon Building om the University of Manchester campus is named after Ernest Simon.

The Simon legacy in Manchester

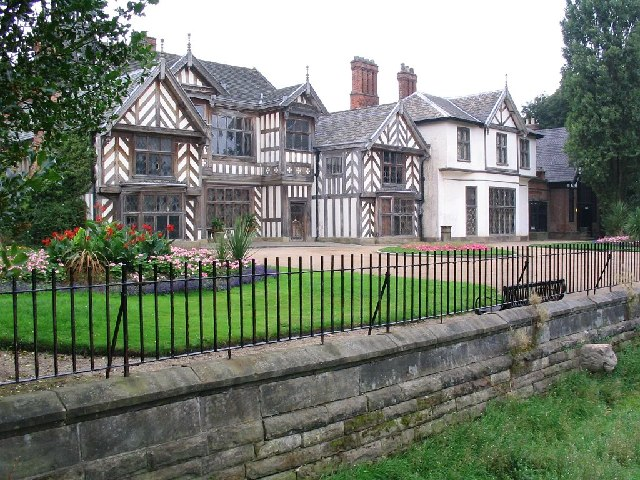
Wythenshawe Hall and Park, donated to the City of Manchester by Lord and Lady Simon in 1926

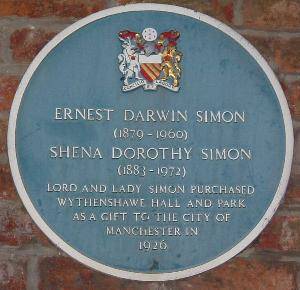
The blue plaque on Wythenshawe Hall commemorating the Simons' gift

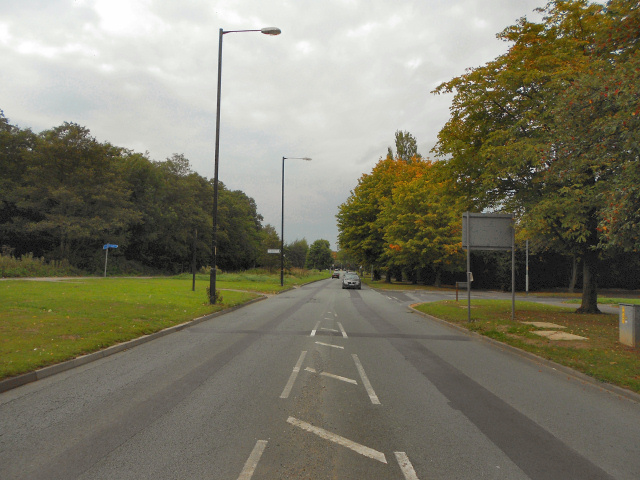
Simonsway in Wythenshawe, named after Lord and Lady Simon

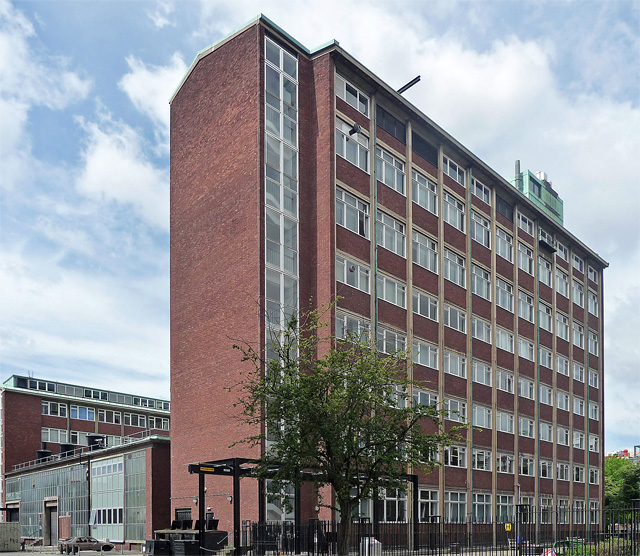
Manchester University Simon Building on Brunswick Street

== Publications ==
- Simon, E. D.; Fitzgerald, Marion (1922). A City Council from Within. London: Longmans.
- Simon, E. D. (1926). A City Council from Within. London: Longmans.
- Simon, E. D. (1933). The Anti-Slum Campaign. London: Longmans.
- Simon, E. D.; Inman, John (1935). The Rebuilding of Manchester. London: Longmans.
- Simon, E. D.; Hubback, Eva (1935). Training for Citizenship. London: Oxford University Press.
- Simon, E. D. (1945). Rebuilding Britain: A Twenty Year Plan. London: Victor Gollancz.
- Simon, E. D. (1953). The BBC from Within. London: Victor Gollancz.

Parliament of the United Kingdom
Preceded by Thomas Watts	Member of Parliament for Manchester Withington; 1923–1924	Succeeded by Thomas Watts
Preceded by Thomas Watts	Member of Parliament for Manchester Withington; 1929–1931	Succeeded by Edward Fleming
Media offices
Preceded by Philip Inman	Chairman of the BBC Board of Governors; 1947–1952	Succeeded by Alexander Cadogan
Peerage of the United Kingdom
New creation	Baron Simon of Wythenshawe; 1947–1960	Succeeded by Roger Simon
