= Parliamentary constituencies in Lancashire =

The ceremonial county of Lancashire (which includes the unitary authorities of Blackburn with Darwen and Blackpool) is divided into sixteen parliamentary constituencies: four borough constituencies and twelve county constituencies. Two seats cross the county boundary - one is shared with Cumbria and one with Merseyside.

== Constituencies ==
† Conservative ‡ Labour The Speaker ±Reform UK ¤Liberal Democrat ¥Green Independent

Constituency (Note: BC denotes borough constituency, CC denotes county constituency.)	Electorate	Majority (Note: The majority is the number of votes the winning candidate receives more than their nearest rival.)	Member of Parliament	Nearest opposition	Map
Blackburn BC	73,263	132	Adnan Hussain (Independent)	Kate Hollern ‡	
Blackpool North and Fleetwood BC	73,339	4,647	Lorraine Beavers ‡	Paul Maynard †	
Blackpool South BC	77,460	6,868	Chris Webb ‡	Mark Butcher ±	
Burnley CC	74,954	3,420	Oliver Ryan ‡	Gordon Birtwistle ¤	
Chorley CC	74,801	20,575	Lindsay Hoyle (The Speaker)	Mark Tebbutt ¥	
Fylde CC	77,100	561	Andrew Snowden †	Tom Calver ‡	
Hyndburn CC	67,147	1,687	Sarah Smith ‡	Sara Britcliffe †	
Lancaster and Wyre CC	74,760	9,253	Cat Smith ‡	Peter Cartridge †	
Morecambe and Lunesdale CC (Note: Cross-county constituency with Cumbria)	76,424	5,815	Lizzi Collinge ‡	David Morris †	
Pendle and Clitheroe CC	78,796	902	Jonathan Hinder ‡	Andrew Stephenson †	
Preston BC	77,400	5,291	Mark Hendrick ‡	Michael Lavalette (Independent)	
Ribble Valley CC	80,484	856	Maya Ellis ‡	Nigel Evans †	
Rossendale and Darwen CC	74,440	5,628	Andy MacNae ‡	Jake Berry †	
South Ribble CC	73,420	6,501	Paul Foster ‡	Katherine Fletcher †	
Southport CC (Note: Cross-county constituency with Merseyside)	73,641	5,789	Patrick Hurley ‡	Damien Moore †	
West Lancashire CC	74,081	8,336	Ashley Dalton ‡	Mike Prendergast †	

== Boundary changes ==
=== 2024 ===
See 2023 review of Westminster constituencies for further details

Former name
1. Blackburn BC
2. Blackpool North and Cleveleys BC
3. Blackpool South BC
4. Burnley BC
5. Chorley CC
6. Fylde CC
7. Hyndburn BC
8. Lancaster and Fleetwood CC
9. Morecambe and Lunesdale CC
10. Pendle BC
11. Preston BC
12. Ribble Valley CC
13. Rossendale and Darwen BC
14. South Ribble CC
15. West Lancashire CC
16. Wyre and Preston North CC
Boundaries 2010–2024

Proposed Revised constituencies in Lancashire

Current name
1. Blackburn BC
2. Blackpool North and Fleetwood BC
3. Blackpool South BC
4. Burnley CC
5. Chorley CC
6. Fylde CC
7. Hyndburn CC
8. Lancaster and Wyre CC
9. Morecambe and Lunesdale CC
10. Pendle and Clitheroe CC
11. Preston BC
12. Ribble Valley CC
13. Rossendale and Darwen CC
14. South Ribble CC
15. Southport CC
16. West Lancashire CC
Boundaries 2024–present

Lancashire 2024–present

For the 2023 review of Westminster constituencies, which redrew the constituency map ahead of the 2024 United Kingdom general election, the Boundary Commission for England opted to combine Lancashire with Cumbria as a sub-region of the North West Region, with the existing seat of Morecambe and Lunesdale extending into southern Cumbria to create a cross-county boundary constituency. Wyre and Preston North was abolished, with its contents being distributed to five neighbouring constituencies. As a consequence, Lancaster and Fleetwood, and Blackpool North and Cleveleys reverted back to the previous names of Lancaster and Wyre, and Blackpool North and Fleetwood respectively. Other proposed changes included the expansion of Pendle to become Pendle and Clitheroe. Four wards in the borough of West Lancashire were incorporated into the Merseyside constituency of Southport.

The following constituencies were proposed:

Containing electoral wards from Blackburn with Darwen

- Blackburn
- Rossendale and Darwen (part)

Containing electoral wards from Blackpool

- Blackpool North and Fleetwood (part)
- Blackpool South

Containing electoral wards from Burnley

- Burnley (part)

Containing electoral wards from Chorley

- Chorley
- South Ribble (part)

Containing electoral wards from Fylde

- Fylde (part)

Containing electoral wards from Hyndburn

- Hyndburn (part)

Containing electoral wards from Lancaster

- Lancaster and Wyre (part)
- Morecambe and Lunsdale (part also in District of South Lakeland in Cumbria)

Containing electoral wards from Pendle

- Burnley (part)
- Pendle and Clitheroe (part)

Containing electoral wards from Preston

- Preston
- Ribble Valley (part)

Containing electoral wards from Ribble Valley

- Pendle and Clitheroe (part)
- Ribble Valley (part)

Containing electoral wards from Rossendale

- Hyndburn (part)
- Rossendale and Darwen (part)

Containing electoral wards from South Ribble

- Ribble Valley (part)
- South Ribble (part)

Containing electoral wards from West Lancashire

- Southport (part also in the Merseyside borough of Sefton)
- West Lancashire

Containing electoral wards from Wyre

- Blackpool North and Fleetwood (part)
- Fylde (part)
- Lancaster and Wyre (part)

=== 2010 ===
Under the fifth periodic review of Westminster constituencies, the Boundary Commission for England decided to increase Lancashire's representation from 15 to 16 constituencies, with the creation of Wyre and Preston North CC. Lancaster and Wyre was reconfigured and became Lancaster and Fleetwood, and Blackpool North and Fleetwood became Blackpool North and Cleveleys. Other changes were made to realign constituency boundaries with the boundaries of current local government wards, and to reduce the electoral disparity between constituencies.

Former name
1. Blackburn BC
2. Blackpool North and Fleetwood BC
3. Blackpool South BC
4. Burnley BC
5. Chorley CC
6. Fylde CC
7. Hyndburn BC
8. Lancaster and Wyre CC
9. Morecambe and Lunesdale CC
10. Pendle BC
11. Preston BC
12. Ribble Valley CC
13. Rossendale and Darwen BC
14. South Ribble CC
15. West Lancashire CC
Boundaries 1997-2010

Parliamentary constituencies in Lancashire

Current name
1. Blackburn BC
2. Blackpool North and Cleveleys BC
3. Blackpool South BC
4. Burnley BC
5. Chorley CC
6. Fylde CC
7. Hyndburn BC
8. Lancaster and Fleetwood CC
9. Morecambe and Lunesdale CC
10. Pendle BC
11. Preston BC
12. Ribble Valley CC
13. Rossendale and Darwen BC
14. South Ribble CC
15. West Lancashire CC
16. Wyre and Preston North CC
Boundaries 2010–2024

Proposed Revised constituencies in Lancashire

== Results history ==
Primary data source: House of Commons research briefing - General election results from 1918 to 2019

=== 2024 ===
The number of votes cast for each political party who fielded candidates in constituencies comprising Lancashire in the 2024 general election were as follows: (Note: Lancashire has two cross-county constituencies. Morecambe and Lunesdale lies predominantly in Lancashire, hence is included in the vote shares below. Southport lies predominantly in Merseyside, hence is excluded from the shares below)

Party	Votes	%	Change from 2019	Seats	Change from 2019
Labour	231,808	36.3%	▼1.5%	13	▲9
Conservative	151,797	23.7%	▼22.5%	1	▼10
Reform	112,124	17.5%	▲15.2%	0	0
Liberal Democrats	38,345	6.0%	▲0.8%	0	0
Greens	35,957	5.6%	▲2.8	0	0
Speaker	25,238	3.9%	▲0.2	1	0
Others	44,000	6.9%	▲5.1%	1	▲1
Total	639,269	100.0		16	

=== Percentage votes ===
Election year	1983	1987	1992	1997	2001	2005	2010	2015	2017	2019	2024
Labour	29.4	34.4	38.9	49.2	46.7	41.4	35.2	37.8	48.2	37.8	36.3
Conservative	48.2	46.3	45.0	34.2	36.4	35.0	38.7	39.3	45.0	46.2	23.7
Reform	-	-	-	-	-	-	-	-	-	2.3	17.5
Liberal Democrat^{1}	21.9	18.9	15.2	12.7	13.3	17.0	18.1	4.8	3.7	5.2	6.0
Green Party	-	*	*	*	*	*	0.6	2.7	1.3	2.8	5.6
UKIP	-	-	-	*	*	*	.8	14.3	1.5	*	*
The Speaker^{2}	-	-	-	-	-	-	-	-	-	3.7	3.9
Other	0.5	0.3	0.9	3.9	3.6	6.5	3.6	1.2	0.3	2.0	6.9

^{1}1983 & 1987 - SDP–Liberal Alliance

^{2}Standing in Chorley, unopposed by the 3 main parties.

* Included in Other

=== Seats ===
Election year	1983	1987	1992	1997	2001	2005	2010	2015	2017	2019	2024
Labour	3	3	7	13	13	12	6	8	8	4	13
Conservative	13	13	9	2	2	3	9	8	8	11	1
The Speaker^{2}	-	-	-	-	-	-	-	-	-	1	1
Independent	-	-	-	-	-	-	-	-	-	-	1
Liberal Democrat^{1}	0	0	0	0	0	0	1	0	0	0	0
The Speaker^{2}	-	-	-	-	-	-	-	-	-	1	1
Total	16	16	16	15	15	15	16	16	16	16	16

^{1}1983 & 1987 - SDP–Liberal Alliance

^{2}Lindsay Hoyle

=== Maps ===
==== 1885-1910 ====
1885

1886

1892

1895

1900

1906

Jan 1910

Dec 1910

==== 1918-1945 ====
1918

1922

1923

1924

1929

1931

1935

1945

==== 1950-1979 ====
1950

1951

1955

1959

1964

1966

1970

Feb 1974

Oct 1974

1979

==== 1983-present ====
1983

1987

1992

1997

2001

2005

2010

2015

2017

2019

==== 2024-present (including two cross-county constituencies) ====
2024

== Historical representation by party ==
A cell marked → (with a different colour background to the preceding cell) indicates that the previous MP continued to sit under a new party name.

=== 1885 to 1918 ===
==== Lancashire area ====
Conservative Labour Liberal Liberal-Labour Liberal Unionist

Constituency	1885	86	1886	86	87	89	90	92	1892	93	95	1895	98	00	1900	00	02	03	04	1906	Jan 10	Dec 10	13	15	17
Accrington	Grafton		Hodge						Leese												Baker				
Barrow-in-Furness	D. Duncan	Caine	→				J. Duncan		Cayzer											C. Duncan					
Blackburn	Peel		Hornby																		Barclay	Norman			
Blackburn	Coddington																			Snowden					
Blackpool	Stanley			Ridley												Worsley-Taylor				Ashley					
Burnley	Rylands		→		Slagg	Balfour				Stanhope					Mitchell					Maddison	Arbuthnot	Morrell			
Chorley	Feilden										Lindsay												Hibbert		
Clitheroe	Kay-Shuttleworth																Shackleton					Smith			
Darwen	Gascoyne-Cecil								Huntington			J. Rutherford									Hindle	Rutherford			
Lancaster	Marton		Williamson									Foster			Helme										
N Lonsdale	Ainslie								Smith			R. Cavendish							→	Haddock					
Ormskirk	Forwood												Stanley												
Preston	Hanbury																	Kerr		Macpherson	Stanley				
Preston	Tomlinson																			Cox	Tobin			Broughton	
Rossendale	S. Cavendish		→					Maden						Mather					Harcourt						Maden

==== Manchester area ====
Conservative Independent Labour Labour Liberal Liberal-Labour Liberal Unionist

Constituency	1885	86	1886	89	90	1892	1895	97	99	00	1900	01	02	04	05	1906	08	Jan 10	Dec 10	11	12	14	15	16	17	18	18
Ashton-under-Lyne	Addison						Whiteley									Scott			Aitken					Stanley			
Bolton	Bridgeman						Harwood														Taylor			Edge			
Bolton	Shepherd-Cross															Gill						Tootill					
Bury	James		→				Kenyon						Toulmin														
Eccles	Egerton				Roby		Leigh-Clare									Pollard											
Gorton	Peacock			Mather			Hatch							→		Hodge											
Heywood	Hoyle					Snape	Kemp							→		Holden		Cawley					Illingworth				
Ince	Blundell-Hollinshead-Blundell					Woods	Blundell-Hollinshead-Blundell									Walsh											
Leigh	Wright						Scott									Brunner		Raffan									
Manchester E	Balfour															Horridge		Sutton									
Manchester N	Hutton		Schwann																								
Manchester NE	Fergusson															Clynes											
Manchester NW	Houldsworth															Churchill	Joynson-Hicks	Kemp			Randles						
Manchester S	Roscoe						Campbell			Peel						Haworth					Glazebrook					Stoker	
Manchester SW	Hamilton		Bright				Galloway									Kelley		Colefax	Needham								
Middleton	Salis-Schwabe	→	T. Fielden			Hopwood	T. Fielden	Duckworth			E. Fielden					Adkins											
Oldham	Hibbert		Lees			Hibbert	Ascroft		Emmott											Denniss							
Oldham	Maclean					Cheetham	Oswald		Runciman		Churchill			→		Bright		Barton									
Prestwich	Buckley		Mowbray				F. Cawley																			O. Cawley	Hopkinson
Radcliffe cum Farnworth	Leake						Mellor				Taylor																
Rochdale	Potter						Royds									Harvey											
Salford North	E. Hardcastle					Holland	Platt-Higgins									Byles									Tillett		
Salford South	Mather		Howorth								Groves					Belloc			Barlow								
Salford West	Armitage		Knowles													Agnew											
Stretford	Agnew		Maclure									Cripps				Nuttall											
Westhoughton	F. Hardcastle					Stanley										Wilson											
Wigan	Powell																	Twist	Neville								

==== Merseyside area ====
Conservative Irish Nationalist Labour Liberal Liberal Unionist

Constituency	1885	1886	86	87	88	92	1892	93	1895	95	97	98	99	1900	02	03	05	1906	07	Jan 10	10	Dec 10	11	15	16	17
Bootle	Sandys																						Bonar Law			
Liverpool Abercromby	Lawrence																	Seely		Chaloner						Stanley
Liverpool E Toxteth	de Worms									Warr					Taylor			→		Hall					Rankin	
Liverpool Everton	Whitley					Willox											Harmood-Banner									
Liverpool Exchange	Baily	Duncan		Neville					Bigham		McArthur							Cherry		Muspratt		Scott				
Liverpool Kirkdale	Baden-Powell											MacIver							McArthur		Kyffin-Taylor			Pennefather		
Liverpool Scotland	O'Connor																									
Liverpool Walton	Gibson				Mattinson		Stock											Smith								
Liverpool W Derby	Hamilton				Cross			Long						Higginbottom		W. Rutherford										
Liverpool W Toxteth	Royden						Houston																			
Newton	Cross		Legh										R. Pilkington					Seddon				Palmer				
St Helens	Seton-Karr																	Glover				Swift				
Southport	G. Pilkington	Curzon										Naylor-Leyland	G. Pilkington	Marshall-Hall				Astbury		Dalrymple-White						
Warrington	Greenall						Pierpont											Crosfield				Smith				
Widnes	Edwards-Moss						Gilliat							Walker												

=== 1918 to 1950 ===
==== Lancashire area ====
Coalition Liberal (1918–1922) / National Liberal (1922–1923) Conservative Constitutionalist Independent Labour Liberal National Labour National Liberal (1931–1968)

Constituency	1918	20	21	1922	1923	24	1924	24	28	1929	29	31	1931	1935	36	38	39	40	41	42	43	1945	46
Accrington	Gray			Buxton	Edwards		→	→		Snowden			Procter									Scott-Elliot	
Barrow-in-Furness	Chadwick			Somerville			Bromley						Walker-Smith									Monslow	
Blackburn	Norman				J. Duckworth					Gill			Elliston									Edwards	
Blackburn	Dean			Henn						Hamilton			Smiles									Castle	
Blackpool North																						Low	
Blackpool / South (1945)	Parkinson			Molloy	Meyler		de Frece						Erskine-Bolst	Robinson									
Burnley	Irving					A. Henderson							Campbell	Burke									
Chorley	Hacking																					Kenyon	
Clitheroe	Davies			Brass																		Randall	
Darwen	Rutherford			Sanderson	Hindle		Sanderson			Samuel				Russell							Prescott		
Fylde	Ashley			Stanley												Lancaster							
Lancaster	Hunter			Singleton	O'Neill		Strickland		Tomlinson	Ramsbotham									Maclean				
Lonsdale	Lowther	→	→	Kennedy	Maden		Lindsay											Fraser					
Nelson and Colne	A. Smith	Graham		Greenwood									Thorp	Silverman									
Ormskirk	Bell			Blundell						Rosbotham		→					King-Hall			→		Wilson	
Preston	Stanley			Hodge			Kennedy			Jowitt	→	→	Moreing					Churchill				Sunderland	Shackleton
Preston	Shaw												Kirkpatrick		Cobb							Segal	
Rossendale	Waddington			Halstead	Waddington					Law			Cross									Walker	

==== Manchester area ====
Coalition Labour Coalition Liberal (1918-22) / National Liberal (1922-23) Conservative Constitutionalist Independent Labour Labour Independent Group Liberal National Government National Liberal (1931-68)

Constituency	1918	19	20	21	22	1922	1923	1924	24	25	28	1929	31	1931	33	1935	37	38	39	40	42	44	1945	45	46	48	49
Ashton-under-Lyne	Stanley		de Frece					Homan			Bellamy		Broadbent			Simpson			Jowitt					Rhodes			
Bolton	Tootill					Russell	Cunliffe					Brothers		Haslam						Cadogan			J. Jones				
Bolton	Edge						Law	Hilton				Law		Entwistle									Lewis				
Bury	Ainsworth															Chorlton							Fletcher				
Eccles	Stevens					Buckle		Bethel				Mort		Potter		Cary							Proctor				
Farnworth	Bagley					Greenall						Rowson		Stones		Rowson		Tomlinson									
Heywood and Radcliffe	Illingworth			Halls		England	→	→	→					Jackson		Porritt				Wootton-Davies			Whittaker		Greenwood		
Ince	Walsh											Macdonald									Brown						
Leigh	Raffan					Twist	Tinker																Boardman				
Manchester Ardwick	Hailwood					Lowth							J. Henderson	Fuller		J. Henderson											
Manchester Blackley	Briggs						Oliver	Briggs				Oliver		Lees-Jones									Diamond				
Manchester Clayton	Hopkinson				Sutton	Flanagan	Sutton							Flanagan		Jagger					Thorneycroft						
Manchester Exchange	Randles					Stockton	Barclay	Fielden								Eckersley				Hewlett			Lever				
Manchester Gorton	Hodge					→	Compton							Bailey		Compton	Benn				Oldfield						
Manchester Hulme	Nall											McElwee		Nall									Lee				
Manchester Moss Side	Hurst						Ackroyd	Hurst								W. Duckworth							Griffiths				
Manchester Platting	Clynes													Chorlton		Clynes							Delargy				
Manchester Rusholme	Stoker	Thorpe					Masterman	Merriman							Radford							Cundiff	Hutchinson				→
Manchester Withington	Carter					Watts	Simon	Watts				Simon		Fleming													
Middleton & Prestwich	Adkins						Stewart-Sandeman													Gates							
Mossley	Hopkinson					→						Gibson		Hopkinson		→							Woods				
Oldham	Barton					Grigg	→			Wiggins		Lang		Crossley		Dodd							Fairhurst				
Oldham	Denniss					Tout		Cooper				Wilson		Kerr									Hale				
Rochdale	Law					Burgess	Muir	Kelly						Jesson		Kelly				Morgan							
Royton	Sugden						Gorman	Davies						Sutcliffe													
Salford North	Tillett							Finburgh				Tillett		Morris									McAdam				
Salford South	Barlow						Toole	Radford				Toole		Stourton									Hardy				
Salford West	Astbury						Haycock	Astbury				Haycock		Astbury		Emery							Royle				
Stretford	T. Robinson						→	→	→			→		Renwick		Crossley			Etherton				Austin				
Westhoughton	Wilson			Davies																							
Wigan	Parkinson																				Foster					Williams	

==== Merseyside area ====
Conservative Irish Nationalist Labour Liberal National Labour

Constituency	1918	19	1922	23	1923	24	1924	29	1929	29	31	1931	33	35	1935	1945	47
Bootle	Royden		Burnie				V. Henderson		Kinley			Crookshank			Errington	Kinley	
Liverpool E Toxteth	Rankin						Jacob	Mond			Buchan-Hepburn						
Liverpool Edge Hill	W. Rutherford			Hayes								H. Rutherford			Critchley	Clitherow	Irvine
Liverpool Everton	Harmood-Banner						Woodcock		Caine		→	Hornby			Kirby		
Liverpool Exchange	Scott								Reynolds				Shute			Braddock	
Liverpool Fairfield	Cohen											Brocklebank				Moody	
Liverpool Kirkdale	Pennefather								Sandham			Rankin				Keenan	
Liverpool Scotland	O'Connor									Logan							
Liverpool Walton	Chilcott								Purbrick							Haworth	
Liverpool Wavertree	Raw		H. Smith		Rathbone		Tinne				Nall-Cain			Cleary	Shaw	Raikes	
Liverpool West Derby	F. Smith	Hall			C. Jones		Allen							Fyfe			
Liverpool West Toxteth	Houston					Gibbins						Wilson		Gibbins			
Newton	Young											Essenhigh			Young		
St Helens	Sexton											Spencer			W. Robinson	Shawcross	
Southport	Dalrymple-White				Brunner		Dalrymple-White					Hudson					
Warrington	H. Smith		Cunningham-Reid		Dukes		Cunningham-Reid		Dukes			Goldie				Porter	
Waterloo	Buckley				Bullock												
Widnes	Walker	A. Henderson	Clayton						Cameron			R. Robinson			Pilkington	Shawcross	

=== 1950 to 1983 ===
==== Lancashire area ====
Conservative Labour

Constituency	1950	51	1951	53	1955	58	1959	62	1964	1966	68	1970	Feb 1974	Oct 1974	79	1979
Blackburn West	Assheton															
Accrington	Hynd									Davidson						
Barrow-in-Furness	Monslow									Booth						
Blackburn East / Blackburn (1955)	Castle															Straw
Blackpool North	Low							Miscampbell								
Blackpool South	Robinson								Blaker							
Burnley	Burke						Jones									
Chorley	Kenyon											Monks	Rodgers			Dover
Clitheroe	Fort						Pearson					Walder			Waddington	
Darwen	Prescott		Fletcher-Cooke													
Fylde North	Stanley									Clegg						
Fylde South	Lancaster											Gardner				
Lancaster	Maclean						Berkeley			Henig		Kellett-Bowman				
Morecambe and Lonsdale	Fraser					de Ferranti			Hall-Davis							Lennox-Boyd
Nelson and Colne	Silverman										Waddington			Hoyle		Lee
Ormskirk	Cross	Salter		Glover								Soref	Kilroy-Silk			
Preston South	Shackleton				Green				Mahon			Green	Thorne			
Preston North	Amery									R. H. Atkins		Holt	R. H. Atkins			R. J. Atkins
Rossendale	Greenwood											Bray		Noble		Trippier

==== Manchester area ====
Conservative Labour Liberal Social Democratic

Constituency	1950	51	1951	52	1955	58	1959	60	61	63	1964	1966	67	68	1970	72	73	Feb 1974	Oct 1974	78	1979	79	81
Manchester Clayton	Thorneycroft																						
Manchester Exchange	Griffiths																Hatton						
Ashton-under-Lyne	Rhodes										Sheldon												
Bolton East	Booth		Bell					E. Taylor			Howarth				Reed			Young					
Bolton West	Lewis		Holt								Oakes				Redmond				Taylor				
Bury and Radcliffe	Fletcher				Bidgood						Ensor				Fidler				White				
Droylsden / Manchester Openshaw (1955)	Woods		W. Williams							Morris													
Eccles	Proctor										Carter-Jones												
Farnworth	Tomlinson			Thornton											Roper								→
Heywood and Royton	Sutcliffe				Leavey						Barnett												
Ince	Brown										McGuire												
Leigh	Boardman																				Cunliffe		
Manchester Ardwick	L. Lever														Kaufman								
Manchester Blackley	Diamond		Johnson								Rose										Eastham		
Manchester Cheetham / Manc Central (74)	H. Lever																					Litherland	
Manchester Gorton	Oldfield				Zilliacus								Marks										
Manchester Moss Side	Horsbrugh						Watts		F. Taylor									Hatton		Morton			
Manchester Withington	Cundiff		Cary															Silvester					
Manchester Wythenshawe	Hill										Morris												
Middleton and Prestwich	Gates		Barlow									Coe			Haselhurst			Callaghan					
Oldham East	Fairhurst		Horobin				Mapp								Lamond								
Oldham West	L. Hale													Campbell	Meacher								
Rochdale	J. Hale		Schofield			McCann										C. Smith							
Salford East	Hardy				Allaun																		
Stretford	Storey											Davies			Churchill								
Salford West	Royle										Orme												
Westhoughton	Davies	Price															Stott						
Wigan	R. Williams					Fitch																	
Constituency	1950	51	1951	52	1955	58	1959	60	61	63	1964	1966	67	68	1970	72	73	Feb 1974	Oct 1974	78	1979	79	81

==== Merseyside area ====
Conservative Labour Liberal Social Democratic

Constituency	1950	1951	52	53	54	1955	57	58	1959	61	64	1964	1966	1970	71	Feb 1974	Oct 1974	79	1979	81
Liverpool Exchange	Braddock													Parry						
Bootle	Kinley					Mahon													Roberts	
Crosby	Bullock			Page																S. Williams
Huyton	Wilson																			
Liverpool Edge Hill	Irvine																	Alton		
Liverpool Garston	Raikes						Bingham						Fortescue			Loyden			Thornton	
Liverpool Kirkdale	Keenan					Pannell						Dunn								→
Liv Scotland / L Sc Exchange (74)	Logan										Alldritt				Marsden	Parry				
Liverpool Toxteth	Bevins											Crawshaw								→
Liverpool Walton	Thompson											Heffer								
Liverpool Wavertree	Tilney															Steen				
Liverpool West Derby	Fyfe				Woollam							Ogden								→
Newton	Lee															Evans				
Southport	Hudson		Fleetwood-Hesketh						Percival											
St Helens	Shawcross							Spriggs												
Warrington	Morgan					Summerskill				T. Williams										Hoyle
Widnes	MacColl														Oakes					

=== 1983 to 2010 ===
Conservative Labour Liberal Democrats

Constituency	1983	1987	91	1992	1997	00	2001	2005
Blackburn	Straw							
Blackpool North / Blackpool N & Fleetwood (1997)	Miscampbell			Elletson	Humble			
Blackpool South	Blaker			Hawkins	Marsden			
Burnley	Pike							Ussher
Chorley	Dover				Hoyle			
Fylde	Gardner	Jack						
Hyndburn	Hargreaves			Pope				
Lancaster / Lancaster & Wyre (1997)	Kellett-Bowman				Dawson			Wallace
Morecambe and Lunesdale	Lennox-Boyd				Smith			
Pendle	Lee			Prentice				
Preston	Thorne	Wise				Hendrick		
Ribble Valley	Waddington		Carr	Evans				
Rossendale and Darwen	Trippier			Anderson				
South Ribble	Atkins				Borrow			
West Lancashire	Hind			Pickthall				
Wyre	Clegg	Mans						

=== 2010 to present ===
Conservative Independent Labour Liberal Democrats Speaker

Constituency	2010	13	14	15	2015	2017	2019	23	24	2024
Blackburn	Straw			→	Hollern					Hussain
Blackpool N & Cleveleys / Blackpool N & Fleetwood ('24)	Maynard									Beavers
Blackpool South	Marsden						Benton	→	Webb	
Burnley	Birtwistle				J. Cooper		Higginbotham			Ryan
Chorley	Hoyle						→			
Fylde	Menzies								→	Snowden
Hyndburn	Jones						Britcliffe			Smith
Lancaster & Fleetwood / Lancaster & Wyre (2024)	Ollerenshaw				Smith					
Morecambe and Lunesdale	Morris									Collinge
Pendle / Pendle and Clitheroe (2024)	Stephenson									Hinder
Preston	Hendrick									
Ribble Valley	Evans	→	→							Ellis
Rossendale and Darwen	Berry									MacNae
South Ribble	Fullbrook				Kennedy		Fletcher			Foster
West Lancashire	R. Cooper							Dalton		
Wyre and Preston North	Wallace									N/A

== See also ==
- Constituencies of the Parliament of the United Kingdom
- Parliamentary constituencies in North West England
