= List of MPs elected in the 1895 United Kingdom general election =

1895–1900 Parliament of the United Kingdom
←	1892–1895 Parliament	1900–1906 Parliament	→
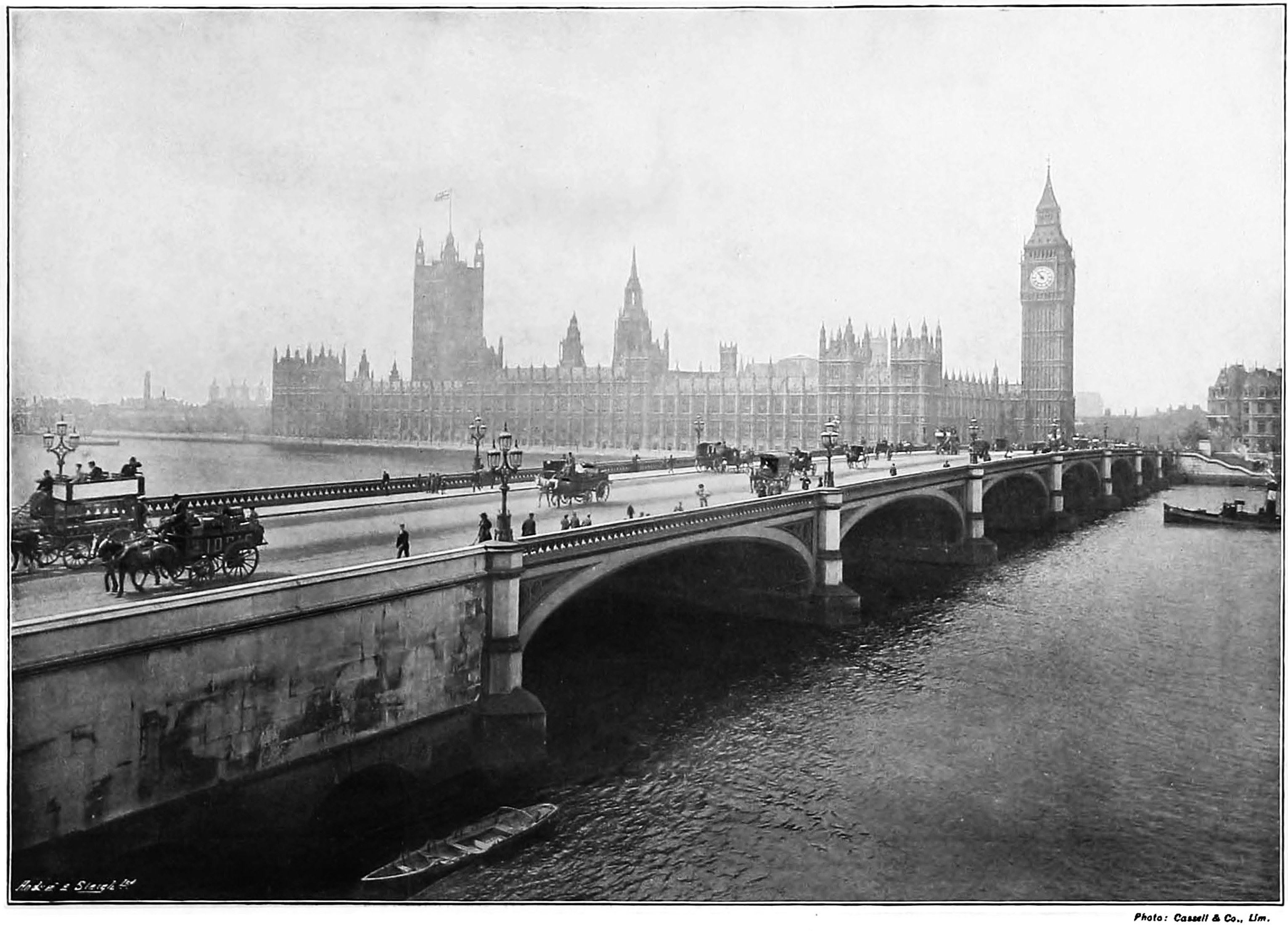
- The Palace of Westminster in 1899

Overview
- Legislative body: Parliament of the United Kingdom
- Jurisdiction: United Kingdom
- Meeting place: Palace of Westminster
- Term: 7 August 1895 – 26 September 1900
- Election: 1895 United Kingdom general election
- Government: Third Salisbury Ministry

House of Commons
- Members: 670
- Speaker: William Court Gully
- Leader: Arthur Balfour
- Prime Minister: Lord Sailsbury
- Leader of the Opposition: Sir Henry Campbell-Bannerman; Sir William Harcourt (until 1898)
- Third-party leader: John Dillon
- Party control: Conservative Party

House of Lords
- Lord Chancellor: Hardinge Giffard, 1st Earl of Halsbury
- Leader: Lord Sailsbury
- Leader of the Opposition: The Earl of Kimberley; The Earl of Rosebery (until 1897)

Crown-in-Parliament Victoria

Sessions
- 1st: 12 August 1895 – 5 September 1895
- 2nd: 11 February 1896 – 14 August 1896
- 3rd: 19 January 1897 – 6 August 1897
- 4th: 8 February 1898 – 12 August 1898
- 5th: 7 February 1899 – 9 August 1899
- 6th: 17 October 1899 – 27 October 1899
- 7th: 30 January 1900 – 8 August 1900

This is a list of members of Parliament (MPs) elected at the 1895 general election, held over several days from 13 July to 7 August 1895.

Party	Seats
Conservative Party	340
Liberal Party	177
Liberal Unionist Party	71
Irish National Federation	70
Irish National League	12

Table of contents:

A B C D E F G H I J K L M N O P Q R S T U V W X Y Z By-elections

== A ==
Constituency	MP	Party
Aberdeen North	William Hunter	Liberal
Aberdeen South	James Bryce	Liberal
Aberdeenshire East	Thomas Buchanan	Liberal
Aberdeenshire West	Robert Farquharson	Liberal
Abingdon	Archie Loyd	Conservative
Accrington	Joseph Leese	Liberal
Altrincham	Coningsby Disraeli	Conservative
Andover	William Wither Bramston Beach	Conservative
Anglesey	Ellis Ellis-Griffith	Liberal
Antrim East	James McCalmont	Conservative
Antrim Mid	Robert Torrens O'Neill	Conservative
Antrim North	Hugh McCalmont	Conservative
Antrim South	William Ellison-Macartney	Conservative
Appleby	Sir Joseph Savory, Bt	Conservative
Arfon	William Jones	Liberal
Argyllshire	Donald Nicol	Conservative
Armagh Mid	Dunbar Barton	Conservative
Armagh North	Edward James Saunderson	Conservative
Armagh South	Edward McHugh	Anti-Parnellite
Ashburton	Charles Seale-Hayne	Liberal
Ashford	Laurence Hardy	Conservative
Ashton-under-Lyne	Herbert Whiteley	Conservative
Aston Manor	George Grice-Hutchinson	Conservative
Aylesbury	Baron Ferdinand de Rothschild	Liberal Unionist
Ayr District of Burghs	Charles Orr-Ewing	Conservative
Ayrshire North	Hon. Thomas Cochrane	Liberal Unionist
Ayrshire South	Sir William Arrol	Liberal Unionist
== B ==
Banbury	Albert Brassey	Conservative
Banffshire	Sir William Wedderburn, Bt	Liberal
Barkston Ash	Robert Gunter	Conservative
Barnard Castle	Sir Joseph Pease, Bt	Liberal
Barnsley	William Compton	Liberal
Barnstaple	Sir Cameron Gull, Bt	Liberal Unionist
Barrow-in-Furness	Charles Cayzer	Conservative
Basingstoke	Arthur Frederick Jeffreys	Conservative
Bassetlaw	Sir Frederick Milner, Bt	Conservative
Bath (Two members)	Wyndham Murray	Conservative
Bath (Two members)	Edmond Wodehouse	Liberal Unionist
Battersea	John Burns	Liberal-Labour
Bedford	Charles Pym	Conservative
Belfast East	Gustav Wilhelm Wolff	Conservative
Belfast North	Sir Edward Harland	Conservative
Belfast South	William Johnston	Conservative
Belfast West	H. O. Arnold-Forster	Liberal Unionist
Bermondsey	Alfred Lafone	Conservative
Berwick-upon-Tweed	Sir Edward Grey, Bt	Liberal
Berwickshire	Harold Tennant	Liberal
Bethnal Green North East	Sir Mancherjee Bhownagree	Conservative
Bethnal Green South West	Edward Pickersgill	Liberal
Bewdley	Alfred Baldwin	Conservative
Biggleswade	Alwyne Compton	Liberal Unionist
Birkenhead	Elliott Lees	Conservative
Birmingham Bordesley	Jesse Collings	Liberal Unionist
Birmingham Central	Ebenezer Parkes	Liberal Unionist
Birmingham East	Sir John Benjamin Stone	Conservative
Birmingham Edgbaston	George Dixon	Liberal Unionist
Birmingham North	William Kenrick	Liberal Unionist
Birmingham South	Joseph Powell-Williams	Liberal Unionist
Birmingham West	Joseph Chamberlain	Liberal Unionist
Birr	Bernard Molloy	Anti-Parnellite
Bishop Auckland	James Mellor Paulton	Liberal
Blackburn (Two members)	Harry Hornby	Conservative
Blackburn (Two members)	William Coddington	Conservative
Blackpool	Sir Matthew White Ridley, Bt	Conservative
Bodmin	Leonard Courtney	Liberal Unionist
Bolton (Two members)	Herbert Shepherd-Cross	Conservative
Bolton (Two members)	George Harwood	Liberal
Bootle	Thomas Sandys	Conservative
Boston	William Garfit	Conservative
Bosworth	Charles McLaren	Liberal
Bow and Bromley	Lionel Holland	Conservative
Bradford Central	James Wanklyn	Liberal Unionist
Bradford East	Henry Byron Reed	Conservative
Bradford West	Ernest Flower	Conservative
Brecknockshire	Charles Morley	Liberal
Brentford	James Bigwood	Conservative
Bridgwater	Edward Stanley	Conservative
Brigg	Harold Reckitt	Liberal
Brighton (Two members)	Gerald Loder	Conservative
Brighton (Two members)	Bruce Vernon-Wentworth	Conservative
Bristol East	Sir William Wills, Bt	Liberal
Bristol North	Lewis Fry	Liberal Unionist
Bristol South	Sir Edward Stock Hill	Conservative
Bristol West	Sir Michael Hicks Beach, Bt	Conservative
Brixton	Marquess of Carmarthen	Conservative
Buckingham	William Carlile	Conservative
Buckrose	Angus Holden	Liberal
Burnley	Hon. Philip Stanhope	Liberal
Burton	Sydney Evershed	Liberal
Bury	James Kenyon	Conservative
Bury St Edmunds	Viscount Chelsea	Conservative
Buteshire	Andrew Murray	Conservative
== C ==
Caithness-shire	Gavin Clark	Liberal
Camberwell North	Philip Dalbiac	Conservative
Camborne	Arthur Strauss	Liberal Unionist
Cambridge	Robert Uniacke-Penrose-Fitzgerald	Conservative
Cambridge University (Two members)	Richard Claverhouse Jebb	Conservative
Cambridge University (Two members)	Sir John Eldon Gorst	Conservative
Canterbury	John Henniker Heaton	Conservative
Cardiff District	James Mackenzie Maclean	Conservative
Cardiganshire	Matthew Vaughan-Davies	Liberal
Carlisle	William Gully	Liberal (Speaker)
County Carlow	John Hammond	Anti-Parnellite
Carmarthen District	Sir John Jenkins	Liberal Unionist
Carmarthenshire East	Abel Thomas	Liberal
Carmarthenshire West	John Morgan	Liberal
Carnarvon	David Lloyd George	Liberal
Cavan East	Samuel Young	Anti-Parnellite
Cavan West	Edmund Vesey Knox	Anti-Parnellite
Chatham	Sir Horatio Davies	Conservative
Chelmsford	Thomas Usborne	Conservative
Chelsea	Charles Whitmore	Conservative
Cheltenham	Francis Russell	Conservative
Chertsey	Charles Harvey Combe	Conservative
Chester	Robert Yerburgh	Conservative
Chester-le-Street	Sir James Joicey, Bt	Liberal
Chesterfield	Thomas Bayley	Liberal
Chesterton	Walter Greene	Conservative
Chichester	Lord Edmund Talbot	Conservative
Chippenham	Sir John Dickson-Poynder, Bt	Conservative
Chorley	Lord Balniel	Conservative
Christchurch	Abel Henry Smith	Conservative
Cirencester	Hon. Benjamin Bathurst	Conservative
Clackmannan and Kinrossshire	John Balfour	Liberal
Clapham	Percy Thornton	Conservative
Clare East	Willie Redmond	Parnellite
Clare West	John Eustace Jameson	Anti-Parnellite
Cleveland	Henry Fell Pease	Liberal
Clitheroe	Sir Ughtred Kay-Shuttleworth, Bt	Liberal
Cockermouth	Sir Wilfrid Lawson, Bt	Liberal
Colchester	Sir Weetman Pearson, Bt	Liberal
Colne Valley	Sir James Kitson, Bt	Liberal
Cork City (Two members)	J. F. X. O'Brien	Irish National Federation
Cork City (Two members)	Maurice Healy	Irish National Federation
County Cork East	Anthony Donelan	Irish National Federation
County Cork Mid	Charles Kearns Deane Tanner	Irish National Federation
County Cork North	James Christopher Flynn	Irish National Federation
County Cork North East	William Abraham	Irish National Federation
County Cork South	Edward Barry	Irish National Federation
County Cork South East	Andrew Commins	Irish National Federation
County Cork West	James Gilhooly	Irish National Federation
Coventry	Charles James Murray	Conservative
Crewe	Hon. Robert Ward	Conservative
Cricklade	Alfred Hopkinson	Liberal Unionist
Croydon	Charles Ritchie	Conservative
== D ==
Darlington	Arthur Pease	Liberal Unionist
Dartford	Sir William Hart Dyke, Bt	Conservative
Darwen	John Rutherford	Conservative
Denbigh Boroughs	William Howell	Conservative
Denbighshire East	Sir George Osborne Morgan, Bt	Liberal
Denbighshire West	John Roberts	Liberal
Deptford	Charles Darling	Conservative
Derby (Two members)	Sir Henry Howe Bemrose	Conservative
Derby (Two members)	Geoffrey Drage	Conservative
Derbyshire Mid	James Alfred Jacoby	Liberal
Derbyshire North East	Thomas Bolton	Liberal
Derbyshire South	John Gretton	Conservative
Derbyshire West	Victor Cavendish	Liberal Unionist
Devizes	Edward Goulding	Conservative
Devonport (Two members)	Hudson Kearley	Liberal
Devonport (Two members)	E. J. C. Morton	Liberal
Dewsbury	Mark Oldroyd	Liberal
Doncaster	Frederick Fison	Conservative
Donegal East	Arthur O'Connor	Anti-Parnellite
Donegal North	Thomas Curran	Anti-Parnellite
Donegal South	J. G. Swift MacNeill	Anti-Parnellite
Donegal West	Timothy Daniel Sullivan	Anti-Parnellite
Dorset East	Hon. Humphrey Sturt	Conservative
Dorset North	John Wingfield-Digby	Conservative
Dorset South	William Brymer	Conservative
Dorset West	Robert Williams	Conservative
Dover	George Wyndham	Conservative
Down East	James Alexander Rentoul	Conservative
Down North	Thomas Waring	Conservative
Down South	Michael McCartan	Anti-Parnellite
Down West	Arthur Hill	Conservative
Droitwich	Richard Martin	Liberal Unionist
County Dublin North	J. J. Clancy	Parnellite
County Dublin South	Hon. Horace Plunkett	Conservative
Dublin College Green	J. E. Kenny	Parnellite
Dublin Harbour	Timothy Harrington	Parnellite
Dublin St Patrick's	William Field	Parnellite
Dublin St Stephen's Green	William Kenny	Liberal Unionist
Dublin University (Two members)	Edward Carson	Conservative
Dublin University (Two members)	David Plunket	Conservative
Dudley	Brooke Robinson	Conservative
Dulwich	John Blundell Maple	Conservative
Dumbartonshire	Alexander Wylie	Conservative
Dumfries District of Burghs	Robert Reid	Liberal
Dumfriesshire	Robinson Souttar	Liberal
Dundee (Two members)	Edmund Robertson	Liberal
Dundee (Two members)	Sir John Leng	Liberal
Durham	Matthew Fowler	Liberal
Durham Mid	John Wilson	Liberal-Labour
Durham North West	Llewellyn Atherley-Jones	Liberal
Durham South East	Sir Henry Havelock-Allan, Bt	Liberal Unionist
== E ==
Ealing	George Hamilton	Conservative
East Grinstead	George Goschen	Conservative
Eastbourne	Edward Field	Conservative
Eccles	Octavius Leigh-Clare	Conservative
Eddisbury	Henry James Tollemache	Conservative
Edinburgh Central	William McEwan	Liberal
Edinburgh East	Robert Wallace	Liberal
Edinburgh South	Robert Cox	Liberal Unionist
Edinburgh West	Lewis McIver	Liberal Unionist
Edinburgh and St Andrews Universities	Charles Pearson	Conservative
Egremont	Hon. Hubert Duncombe	Conservative
Eifion	John Bryn Roberts	Liberal
Elgin District of Burghs	Alexander Asher	Liberal
Elgin and Nairnshires	John Gordon	Conservative
Elland	Thomas Wayman	Liberal
Enfield	Henry Bowles	Conservative
Epping	Mark Lockwood	Conservative
Epsom	Thomas Bucknill	Conservative
Eskdale	Robert Andrew Allison	Liberal
Essex South East	Carne Rasch	Conservative
Evesham	Charles Wigram Long	Conservative
Exeter	Hon. Henry Northcote	Conservative
Eye	Francis Seymour Stevenson	Liberal
== F ==
Falkirk District of Burghs	John Wilson	Liberal Unionist
Fareham	Sir Frederick Fitzwygram	Conservative
Faversham	Frederic Barnes	Conservative
Fermanagh North	Richard Dane	Conservative
Fermanagh South	Jeremiah Jordan	Anti-Parnellite
Fife East	H. H. Asquith	Liberal
Fife West	Augustine Birrell	Liberal
Finsbury Central	William Massey-Mainwaring	Conservative
Finsbury East	Henry Charles Richards	Conservative
Flint District	Herbert Lewis	Liberal
Flintshire	Samuel Smith	Liberal
Forest of Dean	Sir Charles Dilke, Bt	Liberal
Forfarshire	Martin White	Liberal
Frome	Viscount Weymouth	Conservative
Fulham	William Hayes Fisher	Conservative
== G ==
Gainsborough	Emerson Bainbridge	Liberal
Galway Borough	John Pinkerton	Anti-Parnellite
Galway Connemara	William O'Malley	Anti-Parnellite
County Galway East	John Roche	Anti-Parnellite
County Galway North	Denis Kilbride	Anti-Parnellite
County Galway South	David Sheehy	Anti-Parnellite
Gateshead	Sir William Allan	Liberal
Glamorganshire, East	Alfred Thomas	Liberal
Glamorganshire, Mid	Samuel Evans	Liberal
Glamorganshire, South	Windham Wyndham-Quin	Conservative
Glasgow Blackfriars and Hutchesontown	Andrew Provand	Liberal
Glasgow Bridgeton	Sir George Trevelyan, Bt	Liberal
Glasgow Camlachie	Alexander Cross	Liberal Unionist
Glasgow Central	John George Alex Baird	Conservative
Glasgow College	Sir John Stirling-Maxwell, Bt	Conservative
Glasgow St Rollox	Ferdinand Begg	Conservative
Glasgow Tradeston	Archibald Corbett	Liberal Unionist
Glasgow and Aberdeen Universities	James Alexander Campbell	Conservative
Gloucester	Charles James Monk	Liberal Unionist
Gorton	Ernest Hatch	Conservative
Govan	John Wilson	Liberal
Gower District	David Randell	Liberal
Grantham	Henry Lopes	Conservative
Gravesend	James Dampier Palmer	Conservative
Great Grimsby	George Doughty	Liberal
Great Yarmouth	Sir John Colomb	Conservative
Greenock	Sir Thomas Sutherland	Liberal Unionist
Greenwich	Hugh Cecil	Conservative
Guildford	Hon. St John Brodrick	Conservative
== H ==
Hackney Central	Sir Andrew Scoble	Conservative
Hackney North	William Robert Bousfield	Conservative
Hackney South	Thomas Herbert Robertson	Conservative
Haddingtonshire	Richard Haldane	Liberal
Haggerston	John Lowles	Conservative
Halifax (Two members)	Alfred Arnold	Conservative
Halifax (Two members)	William Rawson Shaw	Liberal
Hallamshire	Sir Frederick Mappin, Bt	Liberal
Hammersmith	Walter Tuckfield Goldsworthy	Conservative
Hampstead	Edward Brodie Hoare	Conservative
Handsworth	Sir Henry Meysey-Thompson, Bt	Liberal Unionist
Hanley	William Woodall	Liberal
Harborough	John William Logan	Liberal
Harrow	William Ambrose	Conservative
Hartlepools, The	Sir Thomas Richardson	Liberal Unionist
Harwich	James Round	Conservative
Hastings	William Lucas-Shadwell	Conservative
Hawick District of Burghs	Thomas Shaw	Liberal
Henley	Robert Hodge	Conservative
Hereford	Charles Cooke	Conservative
Hertford	Abel Smith	Conservative
Hexham	Wentworth Beaumont	Liberal
Heywood	George Kemp	Liberal Unionist
High Peak	William Sidebottom	Conservative
Hitchin	George Hudson	Conservative
Holborn	Sir Charles Hall	Conservative
Holderness	George Bethell	Conservative
Holmfirth	Henry Wilson	Liberal
Honiton	Sir John Kennaway, Bt	Conservative
Horncastle	Lord Willoughby de Eresby	Conservative
Hornsey	Henry Stephens	Conservative
Horsham	John Heywood Johnstone	Conservative
Houghton-le-Spring	Robert Cameron	Liberal
Howdenshire	William Wilson-Todd	Conservative
Hoxton	James Stuart	Liberal
Huddersfield	Sir James Woodhouse, Bt	Liberal
Huntingdon	Arthur Smith-Barry	Conservative
Hyde	Joseph Watson Sidebotham	Conservative
Hythe	Sir James Bevan Edwards	Conservative
== I ==
Ilkeston	Sir Walter Foster	Liberal
Ince	Henry Blundell-Hollinshead-Blundell	Conservative
Inverness District of Burghs	Robert Finlay	Liberal Unionist
Inverness-shire	James Evan Bruce Baillie	Conservative
Ipswich (Two members)	Daniel Ford Goddard	Liberal
Ipswich (Two members)	Sir Charles Dalrymple, Bt	Conservative
Isle of Thanet	James Lowther	Conservative
Isle of Wight	Sir Richard Webster	Conservative
Islington East	Benjamin Cohen	Conservative
Islington North	George Trout Bartley	Conservative
Islington South	Sir Albert Rollit	Conservative
Islington West	Thomas Lough	Liberal
== J ==
Jarrow	Sir Charles Palmer, Bt	Liberal
== K ==
Keighley	John Brigg	Liberal
Kendal	Josceline Bagot	Conservative
Kennington	Frederick Cook	Conservative
Kensington North	William Sharpe	Conservative
Kensington South	Sir Algernon Borthwick	Conservative
Kerry East	Michael Davitt	Irish National Federation
Kerry North	Thomas Sexton	Irish National Federation
Kerry South	Denis Kilbride	Irish National Federation
Kerry West	Sir Thomas Esmonde, Bt	Irish National Federation
Kidderminster	Sir Augustus Godson	Conservative
Kildare North	Charles John Engledow	Anti-Parnellite
Kildare South	Matthew Minch	Anti-Parnellite
Kilkenny City	Pat O'Brien	Parnellite
County Kilkenny North	Patrick McDermott	Anti-Parnellite
County Kilkenny South	Samuel Morris	Anti-Parnellite
Kilmarnock Burghs	John McAusland Denny	Conservative
Kincardineshire	John William Crombie	Liberal
King's Lynn	Thomas Gibson Bowles	Conservative
Kingston upon Hull Central	Sir Seymour King	Conservative
Kingston upon Hull East	Joseph Firbank	Conservative
Kingston upon Hull West	Charles Wilson	Liberal
Kingston-upon-Thames	Thomas Skewes-Cox	Conservative
Kingswinford	Alexander Staveley Hill	Conservative
Kirkcaldy District of Burghs	James Dalziel	Liberal
Kirkcudbrightshire	Sir Mark MacTaggart-Stewart, Bt	Conservative
Knutsford	Hon. Alan Egerton	Conservative
== L ==
Lambeth North	Sir Henry Morton Stanley	Liberal Unionist
Lanarkshire Mid	James Caldwell	Liberal
Lanarkshire North East	John Colville	Liberal
Lanarkshire North West	John Goundry Holburn	Liberal
Lanarkshire South	James Hozier	Conservative
Lancaster	William Henry Foster	Conservative
Launceston	Thomas Owen	Liberal
Leeds Central	Gerald Balfour	Conservative
Leeds East	Thomas Leuty	Liberal
Leeds North	William Jackson	Conservative
Leeds South	John Lawson Walton	Liberal
Leeds West	Herbert Gladstone	Liberal
Leek	Charles Bill	Conservative
Leicester (Two members)	Henry Broadhurst	Liberal-Labour
Leicester (Two members)	Walter Hazell	Liberal
Leigh	C. P. Scott	Liberal
Leith District of Burghs	Ronald Munro-Ferguson	Liberal
Leitrim North	P. A. McHugh	Anti-Parnellite
Leitrim South	Jasper Tully	Anti-Parnellite
Leix	Mark MacDonnell	Anti-Parnellite
Leominster	James Rankin	Conservative
Lewes	Sir Henry Fletcher, Bt	Conservative
Lewisham	John Penn	Conservative
Lichfield	Henry Charles Fulford	Liberal
Limehouse	Harry Samuel	Conservative
Limerick City	John Daly	Parnellite
County Limerick East	John Finucane	Anti-Parnellite
County Limerick West	Michael Austin	Anti-Parnellite
Lincoln	Charles Seely	Liberal Unionist
Linlithgowshire	Alexander Ure	Liberal
Liverpool Abercromby	William Lawrence	Conservative
Liverpool East Toxteth	Baron Henry de Worms	Conservative
Liverpool Everton	John A. Willox	Conservative
Liverpool Exchange	John Bigham	Liberal Unionist
Liverpool Kirkdale	Sir George Baden-Powell	Conservative
Liverpool Scotland	T. P. O'Connor	Irish National Federation
Liverpool Walton	James Henry Stock	Conservative
Liverpool West Derby	Walter Long	Conservative
Liverpool West Toxteth	Robert Houston	Conservative
City of London (Two members)	Sir Reginald Hanson, Bt	Conservative
City of London (Two members)	Alban Gibbs	Conservative
London University	Sir John Lubbock, Bt	Liberal Unionist
Londonderry City	Edmund Vesey Knox	Anti-Parnellite
Londonderry North	John Atkinson	Conservative
Londonderry South	Sir Thomas Lea, Bt	Liberal Unionist
Longford North	Justin McCarthy	Anti-Parnellite
Longford South	Edward Blake	Anti-Parnellite
North Lonsdale	Richard Cavendish	Liberal Unionist
Loughborough	Edward Johnson-Ferguson	Liberal
Louth	Robert Perks	Liberal
Louth North	Tim Healy	Irish National Federation
Louth South	Daniel Ambrose	Irish National Federation
Lowestoft	Harry Foster	Conservative
Ludlow	Robert Jasper More	Liberal Unionist
Luton	Thomas Ashton	Liberal
== M ==
Macclesfield	William Bromley-Davenport	Conservative
Maidstone	Sir Frederick Seager Hunt, Bt	Conservative
Maldon	Hon. Charles Hedley Strutt	Conservative
Manchester East	Arthur Balfour	Conservative
Manchester North	Charles Swann	Liberal
Manchester North East	Sir James Fergusson, Bt	Conservative
Manchester North West	Sir William Houldsworth, Bt	Conservative
Manchester South	The Marquess of Lorne	Liberal Unionist
Manchester South West	William Johnson Galloway	Conservative
Mansfield	John Williams	Liberal
Marylebone East	Edmund Boulnois	Conservative
Marylebone West	Sir Horace Farquhar	Liberal Unionist
Mayo East	John Dillon	Irish National Federation
Mayo North	Daniel Crilly	Irish National Federation
Mayo South	Michael Davitt	Irish National Federation
Mayo West	Robert Ambrose	Irish National Federation
Meath North	James Gibney	Irish National Federation
Meath South	John Howard Parnell	Parnellite
Medway	Charles Warde	Conservative
Melton	Edward Manners	Conservative
Merionethshire	T. E. Ellis	Liberal
Merthyr Tydfil (Two members)	D. A. Thomas	Liberal
Merthyr Tydfil (Two members)	William Pritchard Morgan	Liberal
Middlesbrough	Havelock Wilson	Liberal-Labour
Middleton	Thomas Fielden	Conservative
Midlothian	Sir Thomas Gibson-Carmichael, Bt	Liberal
Mile End	Spencer Charrington	Conservative
Monaghan North	Daniel MacAleese	Irish National Federation
Monaghan South	James Daly	Irish National Federation
Monmouth Boroughs	Albert Spicer	Liberal
Monmouthshire North	Reginald McKenna	Liberal
Monmouthshire South	Frederick Courtenay Morgan	Conservative
Monmouthshire West	Sir William Vernon Harcourt	Liberal
Montgomery District	Edward Pryce-Jones	Conservative
Montgomeryshire	Arthur Humphreys-Owen	Liberal
Montrose District of Burghs	John Shiress Will	Liberal
Morley	Alfred Hutton	Liberal
Morpeth	Thomas Burt	Liberal-Labour
== N ==
New Forest	Hon. John Douglas-Scott-Montagu	Conservative
Newark	Harold Finch-Hatton	Conservative
Newbury	William George Mount	Conservative
Newcastle-upon-Tyne (Two members)	Sir Charles Hamond	Conservative
Newcastle-upon-Tyne (Two members)	William Cruddas	Conservative
Newcastle-under-Lyme	William Allen	Liberal
Newington West	Cecil Norton	Liberal
Newmarket	Harry McCalmont	Conservative
Newport	William Kenyon-Slaney	Conservative
Newry	Patrick Carvill	Anti-Parnellite
Newton	Hon. Thomas Legh	Conservative
Norfolk East	Robert John Price	Liberal
Norfolk Mid	Frederick William Wilson	Liberal
Norfolk North	Herbert Cozens-Hardy	Liberal
Norfolk North West	Joseph Arch	Liberal-Labour
Norfolk South	Francis Taylor	Liberal Unionist
Norfolk South West	Thomas Hare	Conservative
Normanton	Benjamin Pickard	Liberal-Labour
Northampton (Two members)	Henry Labouchère	Liberal
Northampton (Two members)	Adolphus Drucker	Conservative
Northamptonshire East	Francis Channing	Liberal
Northamptonshire Mid	James Pender	Conservative
Northamptonshire North	Edward Monckton	Conservative
Northamptonshire South	Hon. Edward Douglas-Pennant	Conservative
Northwich	Sir John Brunner, Bt	Liberal
Norwich (Two members)	Sir Samuel Hoare, Bt	Conservative
Norwich (Two members)	Sir Harry Bullard	Conservative
Norwood	Ernest Tritton	Conservative
Nottingham East	Edward Bond	Conservative
Nottingham South	Lord Henry Cavendish-Bentinck	Conservative
Nottingham West	James Yoxall	Liberal
Nuneaton	Francis Newdegate	Conservative
== O ==
Oldham (Two members)	Robert Ascroft	Conservative
Oldham (Two members)	James Francis Oswald	Conservative
Orkney and Shetland	Sir Leonard Lyell, Bt	Liberal
Ormskirk	Sir Arthur Forwood, Bt	Conservative
Osgoldcross	Sir John Austin	Liberal
Ossory	Eugene Crean	Anti-Parnellite
Oswestry	Stanley Leighton	Conservative
Otley	Marmaduke D'Arcy Wyvill	Conservative
Oxford	The Viscount Valentia	Conservative
Oxford University (Two members)	John Gilbert Talbot	Conservative
Oxford University (Two members)	Sir John Mowbray, Bt	Conservative
== P ==
Paddington North	John Aird	Conservative
Paddington South	Sir George Fardell	Conservative
Paisley	Sir William Dunn, Bt	Liberal
Partick	James Parker Smith	Liberal Unionist
Peckham	Frederick Banbury	Conservative
Peebles and Selkirk	Walter Thorburn	Liberal Unionist
Pembroke and Haverfordwest District	John Laurie	Conservative
Pembrokeshire	William Rees-Davies	Liberal
Penrith	James Lowther	Conservative
Penryn and Falmouth	Frederick John Horniman	Liberal
Perth	Robert Wallace	Liberal
Perthshire Eastern	Sir John Kinloch, Bt	Liberal
Perthshire Western	Sir Donald Currie	Liberal Unionist
Peterborough	Robert Purvis	Liberal Unionist
Petersfield	William Wickham	Conservative
Plymouth (Two members)	Edward Clarke	Conservative
Plymouth (Two members)	Charles Harrison	Liberal
Pontefract	Thomas Nussey	Liberal
Poplar	Sydney Buxton	Liberal
Portsmouth (Two members)	Sir John Baker	Liberal
Portsmouth (Two members)	Walter Clough	Liberal
Preston (Two members)	Robert William Hanbury	Conservative
Preston (Two members)	William Tomlinson	Conservative
Prestwich	Frederick Cawley	Liberal
Pudsey	Briggs Priestley	Liberal
== R ==
Radcliffe-cum-Farnworth	John James Mellor	Conservative
Radnorshire	Powlett Milbank	Conservative
Ramsey	Hon. Ailwyn Fellowes	Conservative
Reading	Charles Townshend Murdoch	Conservative
Reigate	Hon. Henry Cubitt	Conservative
Renfrewshire East	Hugh Shaw-Stewart	Conservative
Renfrewshire West	Charles Renshaw	Conservative
Rhondda District	William Abraham	Liberal-Labour
Richmond	John Hutton	Conservative
Ripon	John Lloyd Wharton	Conservative
Rochdale	Clement Royds	Conservative
Rochester	Viscount Cranborne	Conservative
Romford	Alfred Wigram	Conservative
Roscommon North	James Joseph O'Kelly	Parnellite
Roscommon South	Luke Hayden	Parnellite
Ross	Michael Biddulph	Liberal Unionist
Ross and Cromarty	James Galloway Weir	Liberal
Rossendale	John Maden	Liberal
Rotherham	Sir Arthur Dyke Acland, Bt	Liberal
Rotherhithe	John Macdona	Conservative
Roxburghshire	The Earl of Dalkeith	Conservative
Rugby	Hon. Richard Verney	Conservative
Rushcliffe	John Ellis	Liberal
Rutland	George Finch	Conservative
Rye	Arthur Montagu Brookfield	Conservative
== S ==
Saffron Walden	Charles Gold	Liberal
St Albans	Hon. Vicary Gibbs	Conservative
St Andrews District of Burghs	Henry Torrens Anstruther	Liberal Unionist
St Augustine's	Aretas Akers-Douglas	Conservative
St Austell	William Alexander McArthur	Liberal
St George, Hanover Square	George Goschen	Conservative
St George, Tower Hamlets	Harry Marks	Conservative
St Helens	Henry Seton-Karr	Conservative
St Ives	Thomas Bedford Bolitho	Liberal Unionist
St Pancras East	Robert Webster	Conservative
St Pancras North	Edward Moon	Conservative
St Pancras South	Julian Goldsmid	Liberal Unionist
St Pancras West	Harry Graham	Conservative
Salford North	Frederick Platt-Higgins	Conservative
Salford South	Sir Henry Hoyle Howorth	Conservative
Salford West	Lees Knowles	Conservative
Salisbury	Edward Hulse	Conservative
Scarborough	Joseph Compton-Rickett	Liberal
Sevenoaks	Henry Forster	Conservative
Sheffield Attercliffe	J. Batty Langley	Liberal
Sheffield Brightside	A. J. Mundella	Liberal
Sheffield Central	Sir Howard Vincent	Conservative
Sheffield Ecclesall	Sir Ellis Ashmead-Bartlett	Conservative
Sheffield Hallam	Charles Stuart-Wortley	Conservative
Shipley	Sir Fortescue Flannery	Liberal Unionist
Shrewsbury	Henry Greene	Conservative
Skipton	Walter Morrison	Liberal Unionist
Sleaford	Henry Chaplin	Conservative
Sligo North	Bernard Collery	Anti-Parnellite
Sligo South	Thomas Curran	Anti-Parnellite
Somerset Eastern	Henry Hobhouse	Liberal Unionist
Somerset Northern	Evan Henry Llewellyn	Conservative
Somerset Southern	Edward Strachey	Liberal
South Molton	George Lambert	Liberal
South Shields	William Robson	Liberal
Southampton (Two members)	Sir John Simeon, Bt	Liberal Unionist
Southampton (Two members)	Tankerville Chamberlayne	Conservative
Southport	Hon. George Curzon	Conservative
Southwark West	Richard Causton	Liberal
Sowerby	John William Mellor	Liberal
Spalding	Harry Pollock	Liberal Unionist
Spen Valley	Thomas Whittaker	Liberal
Stafford	Charles Shaw	Liberal
Staffordshire North West	James Heath	Conservative
Staffordshire West	Hamar Alfred Bass	Liberal Unionist
Stalybridge	Tom Harrop Sidebottom	Conservative
Stamford	William Younger	Conservative
Stepney	Frederick Wootton Isaacson	Conservative
Stirling District of Burghs	Sir Henry Campbell-Bannerman	Liberal
Stirlingshire	James McKillop	Conservative
Stockport (Two members)	George Whiteley	Conservative
Stockport (Two members)	Beresford Melville	Conservative
Stockton-on-Tees	Jonathan Samuel	Liberal
Stoke-on-Trent	Douglas Coghill	Liberal Unionist
Stowmarket	Ian Malcolm	Conservative
Strand	Hon. Frederick Smith	Conservative
Stratford-on Avon	Victor Milward	Conservative
Stretford	John Maclure	Conservative
Stroud	Charles Cripps	Conservative
Sudbury	William Quilter	Liberal Unionist
Sunderland (Two members)	Theodore Doxford	Conservative
Sunderland (Two members)	Sir Edward Gourley	Liberal
Sutherlandshire	John MacLeod	Liberal
Swansea District	David Brynmor Jones	Liberal
Swansea Town	Sir John Dillwyn-Llewelyn, Bt	Conservative
== T ==
Tamworth	Philip Muntz	Conservative
Taunton	Alfred Welby	Conservative
Tavistock	Hugh Luttrell	Liberal
Tewkesbury	Sir John Dorington, Bt	Conservative
Thirsk and Malton	John Grant Lawson	Conservative
Thornbury	Charles Colston	Conservative
Tipperary East	Thomas Condon	Anti-Parnellite
Tipperary Mid	James Francis Hogan	Anti-Parnellite
Tipperary North	Patrick Joseph O'Brien	Anti-Parnellite
Tipperary South	Francis Mandeville	Anti-Parnellite
Tiverton	Sir William Walrond, Bt	Conservative
Torquay	Arthur Philpotts	Conservative
Totnes	Francis Bingham Mildmay	Liberal Unionist
Tottenham	Joseph Howard	Conservative
Truro	Edwin Durning-Lawrence	Liberal Unionist
Tullamore	Joseph Francis Fox	Anti-Parnellite
Tunbridge	Arthur Griffith-Boscawen	Conservative
Tynemouth	Richard Donkin	Conservative
Tyneside	Jack Pease	Liberal
Tyrone East	Patrick Doogan	Anti-Parnellite
Tyrone Mid	George Murnaghan	Anti-Parnellite
Tyrone North	Charles Hemphill	Liberal
Tyrone South	Thomas Russell	Liberal Unionist
== U ==
Uxbridge	Sir Frederick Dixon-Hartland, Bt	Conservative
== W ==
Wakefield	Viscount Milton	Liberal Unionist
Walsall	Sydney Gedge	Conservative
Walthamstow	Edmund Widdrington Byrne	Conservative
Walworth	James Bailey	Conservative
Wandsworth	Henry Kimber	Conservative
Wansbeck	Charles Fenwick	Liberal-Labour
Warrington	Robert Pierpoint	Conservative
Warwick and Leamington	Hon. Alfred Lyttelton	Liberal Unionist
Waterford City	John Redmond	Parnellite
Waterford East	Patrick Power	Anti-Parnellite
Waterford West	Alfred Webb	Irish National Federation
Watford	Frederick Halsey	Conservative
Wednesbury	Walford Davis Green	Conservative
Wellington (Salop)	Alexander Brown	Liberal Unionist
Wellington (Somerset)	Sir Alexander Fuller-Acland-Hood, Bt	Conservative
Wells	Hon. Hylton Jolliffe	Conservative
West Bromwich	Ernest Spencer	Conservative
West Ham North	Ernest Gray	Conservative
West Ham South	George Banes	Conservative
Westbury	Richard Chaloner	Conservative
Westhoughton	Edward Stanley	Conservative
Westmeath North	James Tuite	Irish National Federation
Westmeath South	Donal Sullivan	Irish National Federation
Westminster	William Burdett-Coutts	Conservative
Wexford North	Thomas Joseph Healy	Anti-Parnellite
Wexford South	Peter Ffrench	Anti-Parnellite
Whitby	Ernest Beckett	Conservative
Whitechapel	Sir Samuel Montagu, Bt	Liberal
Whitehaven	Augustus Helder	Conservative
Wick District of Burghs	Sir John Pender	Liberal Unionist
Wicklow East	William Joseph Corbet	Parnellite
Wicklow West	James O'Connor	Anti-Parnellite
Widnes	John Saunders Gilliat	Conservative
Wigan	Sir Francis Powell, Bt	Conservative
Wigtownshire	Sir Herbert Maxwell, Bt	Conservative
Wilton	Viscount Folkestone	Conservative
Wimbledon	Cosmo Bonsor	Conservative
Winchester	William Myers	Conservative
Windsor	Francis Barry	Conservative
Wirral	Edward Cotton-Jodrell	Conservative
Wisbech	Charles Tyrrell Giles	Conservative
Wokingham	Sir George Russell, Bt	Conservative
Wolverhampton East	Sir Henry Fowler	Liberal
Wolverhampton South	Charles Pelham Villiers	Liberal Unionist
Wolverhampton West	Alfred Hickman	Conservative
Woodbridge	E. G. Pretyman	Conservative
Woodstock	George Herbert Morrell	Conservative
Woolwich	Edwin Hughes	Conservative
Worcester	George Allsopp	Conservative
Worcestershire East	Austen Chamberlain	Liberal Unionist
Worcestershire North	John William Wilson	Liberal Unionist
Wycombe	Viscount Curzon	Conservative
== Y ==
York (Two members)	John Butcher	Conservative
York (Two members)	Frank Lockwood	Liberal

== By-elections ==
=== 1895 ===
- 22 August: Cavan West - J. P. Farrell, Anti-Parnellite, replacing Edmund Francis Vesey Knox
- 31 August: Inverness Burghs - Sir Robert Finlay QC, Liberal, replacing Gilbert Beith
- 5 September: Kerry South - Thomas Joseph Farrell, Anti-Parnellite, replacing
- 11 September: Limerick - Francis Arthur O'Keefe, Anti-Parnellite, replacing
- 12 September: Waterford West - James John O'Shee, Anti-Parnellite, replacing
- 28 November: Kensington South - The Earl Percy, Conservative, replacing
- 29 November: Liverpool East Toxteth - Augustus Frederick Warr, Conservative, replacing
- 6 December: Dublin University - Rt Hon William Lecky, Unionist, replacing David Plunket, Irish Unionist

=== 1896 ===
- 22 January: Belfast North - Sir James Horner Haslett, Ulster Unionist, replacing Edward Harland, Ulster Unionist
- 28 January: St Pancras South - Capt Herbert Jessel, Unionist, replacing
- 30 January: Brixton - Hon Evelyn Hubbard, Conservative, replacing Marquess of Carmarthen
- 21 February: Wycombe - Viscount Curzon, Conservative, replacing
- 22 February: Southampton - Sir Francis Evans KCMG, Liberal, replacing
- 26 February: Lichfield - Courtenay Warner, Liberal, replacing
- 19 March: Louth South - Richard McGhee (Irish National Federation) replacing Dr Daniel Ambrose (Irish National Federation) who died 17 December 1895
- 27 March: Kerry East - The Hon James Burke Roche (Irish National Federation) replacing Michael Davitt (Irish National Federation) who had been elected for two seats and chose to sit for Mayo South
- 6 April: Dublin College Green - James Laurence Carew, Parnellite, replacing J. E. Kenny Parnellite
- 24 April: Kerry North - Michael Joseph Flavin (Irish National Federation) replacing Thomas Sexton (Irish National Federation) who had resigned
- 1 May: Aberdeen North- Duncan Pirie, Liberal replacing William Hunter, Liberal
- 12 May: Edinburgh & St Andrews Universities - Sir William Overend Priestley, Conservative, replacing
- 2 June: Wick Burghs - Thomas Hedderwick, Liberal, replacing Sir John Pender
- 2 June: Frome - John Barlow, Liberal, replacing
- 10 November: Bradford East - Capt Hon Ronald Greville, Conservative, replacing Henry Byron Reed

=== 1897 ===
- 12 January: Cleveland - Alfred Pease, Liberal, replacing Henry Fell Pease
- 30 January: Forfarshire - Capt John Sinclair, Liberal, replacing Martin White
- 1 February: Romford - Louis Sinclair, Conservative, replacing Alfred Wigram
- 3 February: Walthamstow - Sam Woods, Liberal (Lib-Lab), replacing Edmund Widdrington Byrne
- 15 February: Glasgow Bridgeton - Sir Charles Cameron Bt, Liberal replacing Sir George Trevelyan, Liberal
- 18 February: Chertsey - Henry Leigh-Bennett, Conservative, replacing Charles Harvey Combe
- 3 March: Halifax - Alfred Billson, Liberal, replacing William Rawson Shaw
- 8 June: Petersfield - William Graham Nicholson, Conservative, replacing William Wickham
- 15 July: Roscommon South - John Patrick Hayden, Parnellite, replacing Luke Hayden
- 6 August: Sheffield Brightside - Frederick Maddison, Liberal, replacing A. J. Mundella
- 28 September: Denbighshire East - Samuel Moss, Liberal, replacing George Osborne Morgan
- 28 October: Barnsley - Joseph Walton, Liberal, replacing William Compton, Liberal
- 4 November: Middleton - Ald James Duckworth, Liberal, replacing Thomas Fielden
- 10 November: Liverpool Exchange - Charles McArthur, Unionist, replacing John Bigham

=== 1898 ===
- 12 January: Plymouth - Sigismund Mendl, Liberal, replacing
- 13 January: York - Rear Adm Lord Charles Beresford CB, Conservative, replacing
- 21 January: Mid Armagh - Dunbar Barton QC, Conservative, reelected
- 21 January: Dublin St Stephen's Green - James Campbell QC, Conservative, replacing
- 3 February: Marylebone West - Sir Samuel E. Scott Bt, Conservative, replacing
- 3 February: Wolverhampton South - John Lloyd Gibbons, Unionist, replacing Charles Pelham Villiers
- 15 February: Pembrokeshire - John Wynford Philipps, Liberal, replacing
- 15 February: Edgbaston - Francis William Lowe, Conservative, replacing
- 24 February: Cricklade - Edmund Fitzmaurice, Liberal, replacing Alfred Hopkinson
- 9 March: Stepney - W. C. Steadman, Liberal (Lib-Lab), replacing
- 26 March: Maidstone - Fiennes Cornwallis, Conservative, replacing
- 30 March: Wokingham - Comm Oliver Young RN, Conservative, replacing
- 10 May: Newark - Viscount Newark, Conservative, replacing
- 10 May: Staffordshire West - Alexander Henderson, Unionist, replacing
- 12 May: Norfolk South - Arthur W. Soames, Liberal, replacing
- 22 June: Hertford - Evelyn Cecil, Conservative, replacing
- 13 July: Gravesend - John H Dudley Ryder, Conservative, replacing
- 18 July: Down West - Capt Arthur Hill, Conservative, replacing
- 25 July: Reading - George William Palmer, Liberal, replacing
- 2 August: Great Grimsby - George Doughty, Unionist, replacing
- 3 August: Launceston - J Fletcher Moulton QC, Liberal, replacing
- 7 September: Down North - John Blakiston-Houston, Conservative, replacing
- 17 September: Darlington - Herbert Pike Pease, Unionist, replacing
- 20 October: Ormskirk - Hon Arthur Stanley, Conservative, replacing Arthur Bower Forwood
- 1 November: North Fermanagh - Edward Mervyn Archdale, Conservative, replacing Richard Dane
- 9 December: Liverpool Kirkdale - David MacIver, Conservative, replacing

=== 1899 ===
- 6 January: Aylesbury - Hon Lionel Walter Rothschild, Unionist, replacing Baron Ferdinand de Rothschild
- 16 January: Newton - Lt Col Richard Pilkington, Conservative, replacing
- 23 January: Epsom - William Keswick, Conservative, replacing
- 14 February: Birmingham North - John Throgmorton Middlemore, Unionist, replacing William Kenrick
- 16 February: Londonderry - Count Arthur Moore, Anti-Parnellite, replacing Edmund Vesey Knox
- 21 February: Lanarkshire North West - Charles Mackinnon Douglas, Liberal, replacing John Goundry Holburn
- 23 February: Rotherham - William Henry Holland, Liberal, replacing
- 25 February: Antrim North - William Moore, Unionist, replacing Hugh McCalmont
- March: Hythe - Sir Edward Albert Sassoon Bt, Conservative, replacing
- 8 March: Elland - Charles Philips Trevelyan, Liberal, replacing
- 16 March: Norfolk North - Sir William Brampton Gurdon KCMG, Liberal, replacing Herbert Cozens-Hardy (appointed to bench)
- 5 April: Harrow - Irwin Cox, Conservative, replacing William Ambrose
- 2 May: Merionethshire - Prof Owen Morgan Edwards, Liberal, replacing
- 11 May: Oxford University - Sir William Reynell Anson Bt, Unionist, replacing
- 30 May: Southport - Sir George Augustus Pilkington, Liberal, replacing
- 20 June: Edinburgh South - Arthur Dewar, Liberal, replacing Robert Cox
- 23 June: Edinburgh East - George McCrae, Liberal, replacing Robert Wallace
- 5 July: Osgoldcross - Sir John Austin Bt, Liberal, replacing
- 6 July: Oldham - Alfred Emmott and Walter Runciman, Liberal, replacing Robert Ascroft and James Francis Oswald
- 12 July: St Pancras East - Thomas Wrightson, Conservative, replacing
- 27 October: Bow and Bromley - Walter Murray Guthrie, Conservative, replacing Lionel Holland
- 6 November: Exeter - Sir Edgar Vincent KCMG, Conservative, replacing
- 1899: Clackmannan and Kinross-shires- Eugene Wason, replacing John Balfour, Liberal
- 1899: Wells -
- 1899: Mayo South -

incomplete for 1899 and 1900

== Sources ==
Whitaker's Almanac 1900

== See also ==
- List of parliaments of the United Kingdom
- UK general election, 1895
