= Fylde North =

UK Parliament constituency (1950–1983)

Coordinates: 53.918°N 2.939°W

- Former county constituency for the House of Commons
- Fylde North in Lancashire, showing boundaries used from 1974–1983
- County: Lancashire
- Major settlements: Fleetwood, Poulton-le-Fylde, Preesall, Thornton Cleveleys and the Garstang Rural District

1950–1983
- Created from: Fylde and Lancaster
- Replaced by: Wyre and Lancaster

Fylde North was a constituency which returned one Member of Parliament (MP) to the House of Commons of the Parliament of the United Kingdom from 1950, until it was abolished for the 1983 general election.

== Boundaries ==
The constituency was established in 1950, with the split of the Fylde constituency. It covered the borough of Fleetwood, the urban districts of Poulton-le-Fylde, Preesall and Thornton Cleveleys and the Garstang Rural District.

It was largely replaced by the new seat of Wyre, although Garstang was added to Lancaster instead.

== Members of Parliament ==
Election	Member	Party
1950	Richard Stanley	Conservative
1966	Sir Walter Clegg	Conservative
1983	constituency abolished: see Wyre	

== Elections ==
=== Elections in the 1950s ===
General election 1950: Fylde North
Party	Candidate	Votes	%
Conservative	Richard Stanley	23,538	60.85
Labour	Philip Henry Couldry	10,515	27.18
Liberal	John Wilcock Robinson	4,631	11.97
Majority		13,023	33.67
Turnout		38,684	82.76
Conservative win (new seat)			

General election 1951: Fylde North
Party	Candidate	Votes	%	±%
Conservative	Richard Stanley	25,419	69.26	
Labour	John B Morris	11,284	30.74	
Majority		14,135	38.52	
Turnout		36,703	77.58	
Conservative hold		Swing		

General election 1955: Fylde North
Party	Candidate	Votes	%	±%
Conservative	Richard Stanley	23,812	72.24	
Labour	Leslie Spriggs	9,152	27.76	
Majority		14,660	44.48	
Turnout		32,964	68.56	
Conservative hold		Swing		

General election 1959: Fylde North
Party	Candidate	Votes	%	±%
Conservative	Richard Stanley	27,045	70.52	
Labour	John Myerscough	11,307	29.48	
Majority		15,738	41.04	
Turnout		38,352	71.20	
Conservative hold		Swing		

=== Elections in the 1960s ===
General election 1964: Fylde North
Party	Candidate	Votes	%	±%
Conservative	Richard Stanley	27,801	65.29	
Labour	Ronald G Truman	14,777	34.71	
Majority		13,024	30.58	
Turnout		42,578	72.16	
Conservative hold		Swing		

General election 1966: Fylde North
Party	Candidate	Votes	%	±%
Conservative	Walter Clegg	24,217	53.64	
Labour	Keith Bell	14,045	31.11	
Liberal	James Rafton Smallwood	6,058	13.42	New
Coalition Unity	Peter Lowe	826	1.83	New
Majority		10,172	22.53	
Turnout		45,146	73.38	
Conservative hold		Swing		

=== Elections in the 1970s ===
General election 1970: Fylde North
Party	Candidate	Votes	%	±%
Conservative	Walter Clegg	33,667	68.9	+15.3
Labour	Raymond W. Hill	15,235	31.2	+0.1
Majority		18,432	37.7	+15.2
Turnout		48,902	68.3	−5.1
Conservative hold		Swing	+7.6	

General election February 1974: Fylde North
Party	Candidate	Votes	%	±%
Conservative	Walter Clegg	36,577	68.4	−0.5
Labour	David Hunter Sparks	16,919	31.6	+0.4
Majority		19,658	36.8	−0.9
Turnout		53,496	72.1	+2.8
Conservative hold		Swing	−0.4	

General election October 1974: Fylde North
Party	Candidate	Votes	%	±%
Conservative	Walter Clegg	29,661	55.5	−12.9
Labour	Humphry Berkeley	12,522	23.4	−10.2
Liberal	Antony Perry	11,254	21.1	New
Majority		17,139	32.1	−4.7
Turnout		53,437	71.4	−0.7
Conservative hold		Swing	−1.4	

General election 1979: Fylde North
Party	Candidate	Votes	%	±%
Conservative	Walter Clegg	35,366	60.1	+4.6
Labour	Roland Fox	14,376	24.4	+1.0
Liberal	Peter Herbert	8,630	14.7	−6.4
National Front	Kenneth Hugh Warbarton	481	0.8	New
Majority		20,990	35.7	+3.6
Turnout		58,853	75.3	+3.9
Conservative hold		Swing	+1.8	
