= Michael Meacher =

British politician (1939–2015)

The Right Honourable Michael Meacher
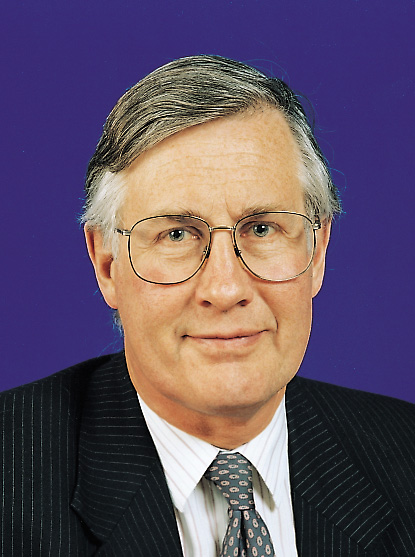
- Official portrait, c. 1997–1999

Minister of State for the Environment
- In office 2 May 1997 – 13 June 2003
- Prime Minister: Tony Blair
- Preceded by: John Gummer
- Succeeded by: Elliot Morley

Parliamentary Under-Secretary of State for Trade
- In office 5 April 1976 – 4 May 1979
- Prime Minister: James Callaghan
- Preceded by: Stanley Clinton Davis
- Succeeded by: Norman Tebbit

Parliamentary Under-Secretary of State for Health and Social Security
- In office 12 June 1975 – 5 April 1976
- Prime Minister: Harold Wilson
- Preceded by: Alec Jones
- Succeeded by: Eric Deakins

Parliamentary Under-Secretary of State for Industry
- In office 7 March 1974 – 12 June 1975
- Prime Minister: Harold Wilson
- Preceded by: Peter Emery
- Succeeded by: Gerald Kaufman
Shadow Cabinet portfolios 1983–1997
Shadow Secretary of State
1989–1992	Social Security
1987–1989	Employment
1983–1987	Health and Social Services
1993–1994	Chancellor of the Duchy of Lancaster
1994–1995	Transport
Shadow Minister
1992–1993	Overseas Development
1993–1994	Citizen's Charter
1996–1997	Environmental Protection

Member of Parliament for Oldham West and Royton Oldham West (1970–1997)
- In office 18 June 1970 – 20 October 2015
- Preceded by: Bruce Campbell
- Succeeded by: Jim McMahon

Personal details
- Born: Michael Hugh Meacher; 4 November 1939 Hemel Hempstead, England
- Died: 20 October 2015 (aged 75) Tooting, London, England
- Party: Labour
- Spouses: Molly Reid (m. 1962; div. 1987) Lucianne Sawyer (m. 1988)
- Children: 4
- Education: New College, Oxford; London School of Economics

Michael Hugh Meacher (4 November 1939 – 20 October 2015) was a British politician who served as a government minister under Harold Wilson, James Callaghan and Tony Blair. A member of the Labour Party, he was Member of Parliament (MP) for Oldham West and Royton, previously Oldham West, from 1970 until his death in 2015.

Before entering politics, Meacher was a lecturer in social administration at the University of Essex and the University of York.

== Early life and education ==
Meacher was born in Hemel Hempstead in Hertfordshire on 4 November 1939, into a family with links to brewing and agriculture. He was the only child of (George) Hubert Meacher and his wife Doris (née Foxell). His father worked in finance, before a breakdown saw him return to the family farm. With the family having little money, his mother took in lodgers and worked for a local doctor; she had aspirations for Michael to become an Anglican priest. Hubert Meacher's first cousin was the judge Clement Bailhache.

Meacher was educated at Berkhamsted School, at the time an all-boys independent school, to which he won a scholarship. He then studied at New College, Oxford where he graduated with a first-class honours degree in classics and divinity, and at the London School of Economics, where he gained a Diploma in Social Administration.

== Life and career ==
Meacher became a researcher and lecturer in social administration at the Essex and York universities and wrote a book about elderly people's treatment in mental hospitals. He was the Labour Party candidate for Colchester at the 1966 general election, and fought the 1968 Oldham West by-election following the resignation of Labour MP Leslie Hale but lost to Conservative candidate Bruce Campbell.

=== In Parliament ===
==== Junior minister and Shadow Cabinet ====
Meacher was first elected to Parliament in 1970 for Oldham West, reversing his previous defeat, and served as a junior minister under Harold Wilson and James Callaghan (Parliamentary Under-Secretary for Industry, 1974–75; Parliamentary Under-Secretary for Health and Social Security, 1975–79).

During Labour's time in opposition, he was in the Shadow cabinet for fourteen years, and concurrently lectured at the LSE. He was seen as a figure on the left and an ally of Tony Benn, and stood as the left's candidate against Roy Hattersley in the 1983 deputy leadership election.

==== Blair Ministry ====
Meacher was an elected member of the Shadow Cabinet from 1983 to 1997, but Tony Blair refused to appoint him to the Cabinet, and instead made him Minister of State for the Environment, first at the Department of the Environment, Transport and the Regions (1997–2001), then at the renamed Department for Environment, Food and Rural Affairs (2001–2003).

Despite Blair's hostility, Meacher gained a reputation for being a politician who was on top of a complex brief and was one of the longest serving ministers in the same job in the Labour Government, from 1997 to 2003. He was criticised for hypocrisy when he condemned second home owners; according to the BBC and Channel 4's The Mark Thomas Comedy Product, he and his wife owned more than five homes themselves.

==== Political activities after 2003 ====
Meacher was sacked in June 2003, and replaced by Elliot Morley. He subsequently attacked the Labour government on a number of issues, particularly over genetically modified food and the 2003 Iraq War, though in the run-up to the invasion he had accepted reports by the intelligence services and government, saying that Iraq had chemical weapons.

Meacher claimed that a supposed absence of prevention by United States authorities of the September 11 attacks was "suspicious" and "offered an extremely convenient pretext" for subsequent military action in Afghanistan and Iraq. This was seen as giving "credence to conspiracy theories" as claimed by The Guardian. Meacher also wrote a foreword for David Ray Griffin's book The New Pearl Harbor.

In May 2005, Meacher introduced an early day motion on climate change, which called upon the government to commit to yearly CO_{2} emission reductions of 3%.

In June 2006 various articles appeared in the British media claiming Meacher would stand as a stalking horse against Tony Blair in order to initiate a leadership contest; others suggested, especially after Gordon Brown came out in support of the Trident missile programme and nuclear energy, that Meacher would challenge Brown from the left.

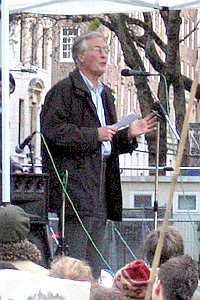
Meacher in 2005

On 23 September 2006, Meacher became the sixth Labour MP to start a blog. Meacher also wrote articles for ePolitix.com, which included criticism of Blair and Brown for perceived right-wing policies, including privatisation. He also called for a more conciliatory policy in the Middle East, attempts to tackle income inequality, and a greater commitment to reducing energy use.

On 22 February 2007, Meacher declared that he would be standing, challenging Brown and John McDonnell. However, on 14 May, after talks with McDonnell, he announced he would stand aside in order to back McDonnell as the "candidate of the left".

In December 2013, Meacher attacked the firm Atos and its Work Capability Assessments of disabled people carried out on behalf of the Department for Work and Pensions, in a sustained campaign documented through his blog. Meacher was one of 36 Labour MPs to nominate Jeremy Corbyn as a candidate in the leadership election of 2015.

== Leadership bid ==
On 22 February 2007, Meacher declared his intention to stand for the leadership of the Labour Party. The decisions of both Meacher and John McDonnell to run for the leadership were controversial with many accusing Meacher of trying to split the nominations and keep McDonnell off the ballot paper, although neither candidate was thought to have any chance of winning the contest.

On 21 April 2007, The Guardian claimed that Meacher had the support of no more than three MPs and that his campaign was "virtually dead in the water".

On 27 April 2007, it was reported that Meacher had reached an agreement with McDonnell that upon the day Blair announced his resignation, whichever of the two had fewer nominations would step aside and allow the other to challenge Gordon Brown. On 14 May 2007, Meacher agreed to stand aside to allow McDonnell to be the sole leadership candidate of the left. Subsequent articles reported that Meacher had 21 declarations of support while McDonnell had 24. In the Labour Party's leadership nomination process, McDonnell received nominations from 29 MPs.

== Outside Parliament ==
Meacher appeared as himself in one episode of the BBC drama serial Edge of Darkness (1985).

In June 1988, Meacher lost a libel action against journalist Alan Watkins, who had written an article in November 1984 that included the remark that Meacher "likes to claim that he is the son of an agricultural labourer" despite the fact that his father had trained as an accountant.

Meacher was a member of Political Leaders for 9/11 Truth, which petitioned President Obama for an independent investigation into the September 11 attacks not led by "individuals closely aligned with, or even employed by, the Bush-Cheney administration."

Meacher was a member of the Fabian Society.

== Personal life ==
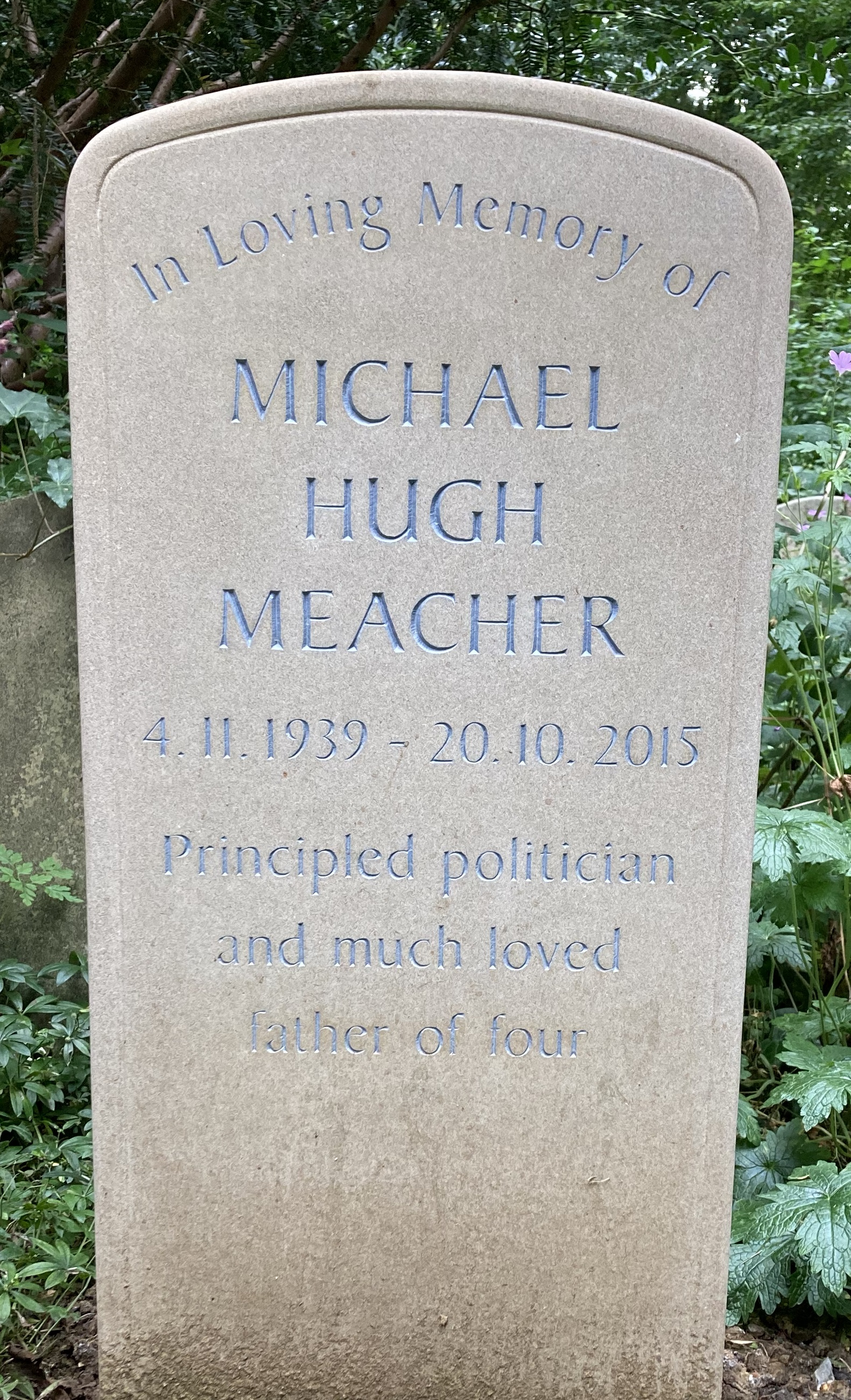
Grave of Michael Meacher in Highgate Cemetery

Meacher married Molly Reid in 1962; they had four children and divorced in 1987. The following year, he married Lucianne Sawyer. In January 2001, he faced claims of political hypocrisy, when it was revealed that he and Lucianne owned at least nine buy to let properties as investments.

Meacher died from lung cancer at St George's Hospital in London on 20 October 2015, at the age of 75, and was buried on the western side of Highgate Cemetery.

Parliament of the United Kingdom
Preceded by Bruce Campbell	Member of Parliament for Oldham West and Royton; Oldham West (1970–1997); 1970–2015	Succeeded by Jim McMahon
Political offices
Preceded by John Gummer	Minister of State for the Environment; 1997–2003	Succeeded by Elliot Morley
