= 1899 Oldham by-election =

UK parliamentary by-election

- 6 July 1899

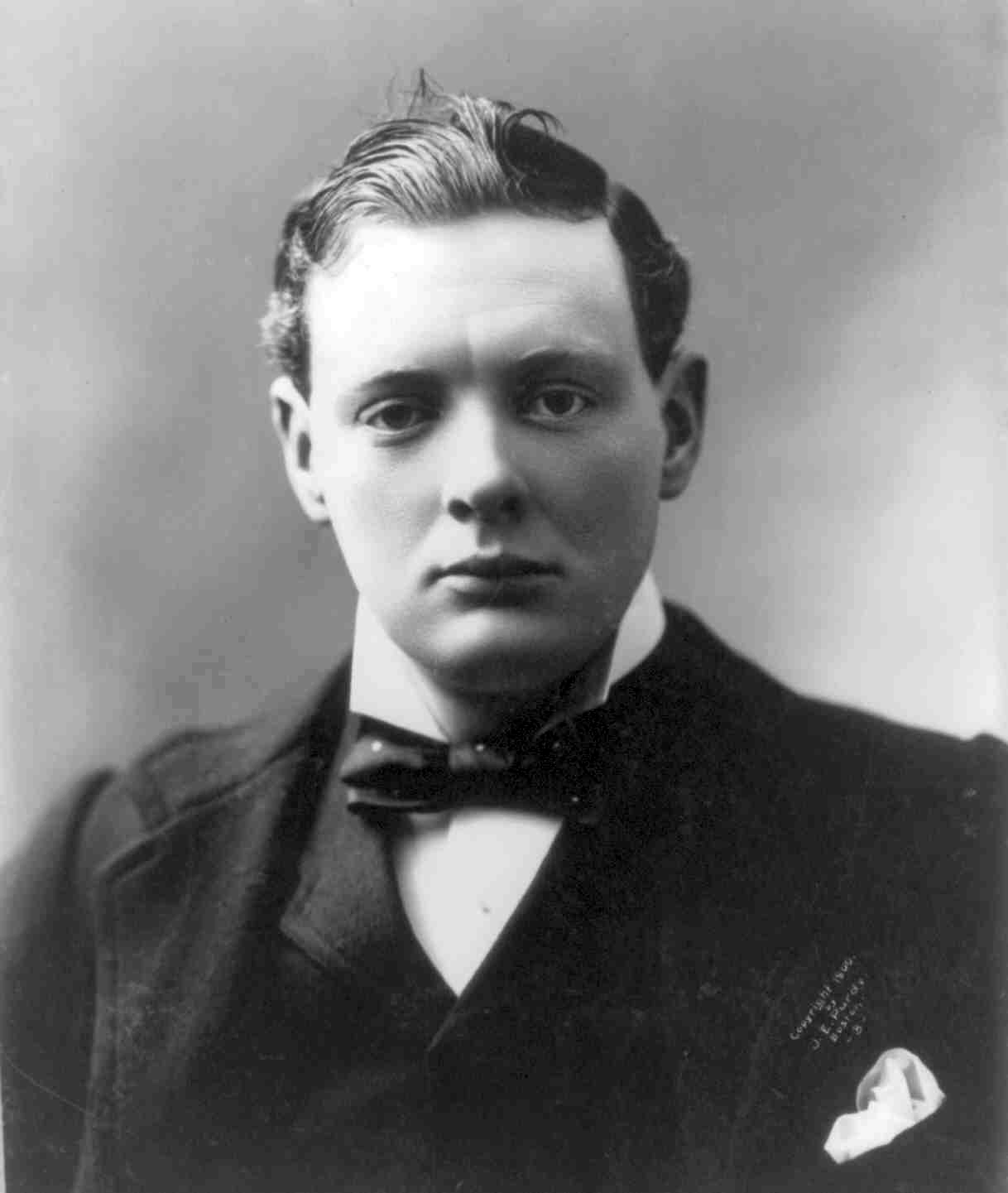

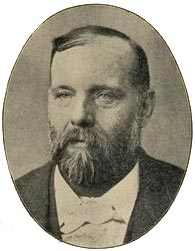
Nominee	Alfred Emmott	Walter Runciman	Winston Churchill
Party	Liberal	Liberal	Conservative
Popular vote	12,976	12,770	11,477
Percentage	26.7%	26.2%	23.6%
Nominee	James Mawdsley
Party	Conservative
Popular vote	11,449
Percentage	23.5%
MP before election
Robert Ascroft
James Francis Oswald
Conservative
Elected MP
Alfred Emmott
Walter Runciman
Liberal

The 1899 Oldham by-election occurred in the summer of that year, and involved a by-election to fill both seats in the two-member Oldham Parliamentary borough. The block voting method allowed each elector to vote for two candidates.

The election resulted in the Liberal Party winning both seats from the Conservatives who had previously held them, but the election is notable mainly for being the first to be fought by future Conservative Prime Minister, Winston Churchill.

== Background ==
At the beginning of 1899, the two members of parliament for Oldham were Robert Ascroft and James Oswald. However, Oswald had been chronically ill for many months and had been absent from his Parliamentary duties and his constituency. He had indicated that he would not seek re-election and left a resignation note with the Conservative Party and instructed them to use it if they thought it to be expedient. Ascroft was an active in Parliament but was struck down with pneumonia at his home in Croydon on 12 June, becoming partially unconscious. Over the next few days, his condition did not improve, and by 18 June there was said to be "very little hope". He died on the afternoon of 19 June.

Ascroft's sudden death created an opportunity for the Conservative Party to use Oswald's resignation note and hold a double by-election, but the party delayed the decision until Ascroft's funeral, on 23 June. It was later observed that Ascroft had been very popular in the town but failed to maintain a group of election campaign workers, presumably in the hope that his personal support would be enough. The forcing of a by-election therefore surprised Oldham Conservatives.

Nevertheless, on 26 June, Oswald's resignation note was sent in and so he was appointed Steward of the Manor of Northstead as a way of resigning his seat.

== Candidates ==
Before his illness, Ascroft had already met with Churchill at the House of Commons to ask him to replace Oswald and run as the second candidate at the next election. The date of a joint follow-up meeting in Oldham had been fixed for some time when Churchill noticed in the newspapers that Ascroft had died. The Conservative Party officers met in Oldham on the evening of 23 June as arranged to hear from Churchill and unanimously adopted him as the party's candidate for the single by-election to replace Ascroft. The meeting then decided to leave the question of a second candidate to another meeting on the following night. Churchill was known principally as the son of Lord Randolph Churchill, a senior Conservative politician who had died four years earlier. Although only 24, the young Churchill had begun a journalistic career as a war correspondent with the Morning Post. According to one observer, society then knew Churchill as "a brilliant and irrepressible talker".

The second Conservative candidate turned out to be James Mawdsley, who was secretary of the Amalgamated Association of Operative Cotton Spinners, an unusual case of a Conservative who was an active trade unionist. The choice of Mawdsley as Conservative candidate had been kept secret and surprised several Conservatives, who were not in the very small meeting at which the candidates were adopted. There was some discussion of which of the two very different Conservative candidates, the aristocrat or the labour representative, would be more popular in Oldham.

Only one name was initially put forward for the Liberal Party selection, that of Alfred Emmott; however, by the time the selection meeting took place on the evening of Monday 26 June it was clear that there would be a double vacancy and so he was adopted together with Walter Runciman. Emmott had been a member of Oldham Corporation for nearly 20 years and was the town's mayor in 1891 to 1892. He had been invited but declined the offer of the Liberal candidacy in 1886. Runciman was the 28-year-old son of Walter Runciman, 1st Baron Runciman, a shipping magnate.

== Campaign ==
The writ for a new election for both seats was moved in the House of Commons by the Conservative chief whip William Walrond on Tuesday 27 June. Polling day was set for Thursday 6 July.

As the previous election had been close, the by-election campaign was an intense one in which the candidates addressed meetings "at breakfast time, during the dinner hour, and in the evening". One of the main campaign issues was the Clerical Tithes Bill, which the Conservative-dominated government was promoting, which would give additional help to Church of England clergy and to Church schools. Oldham included many Nonconformists who were opposed to the Bill. When the issue of the Bill was raised, the Liberal candidates opposed it, arguing that Parliament was not the place to discuss matters of faith. Churchill initially supported it on the basis that legislation was needed to maintain law and order.

A Protestant delegation representing several organisations was pleased with the pledge to support the Bill and strongly endorsed Churchill and Mawdsley. However, when Churchill, who later admitted that he knew nothing of the issue, found out how unpopular the Bill was, he declared in a speech three days before polling day that he would have voted against it, in accordance with the wishes of his constituents.

Churchill made a campaigning visit to Hollinwood, then known as a strongly anti-Conservative area, as his father had done in previous elections. His appearance prompted a heckler to declare, "Eh, lad, thou art a chip of t'owd block". On 3 July, the two Conservative candidates received a delegation on women's suffrage, to which Churchill declared himself opposed, as it would lessen the respect for women "which all men very rightly have". Mawdsley, however, declared his support.

The presence of trade unionist Mawdsley as a Conservative candidate caused some degree of protest. The Royton branch of his union passed, 107 to 54, a motion protesting at his candidature, and Mawdsley was asked why he had not come forward as a Labour candidate when he was invited to in 1895. Mawdsley replied that there had been a decision to run two candidates: one being Liberal-Labour and the other (himself) a Conservative-Labour candidate. He further said that he would support a Liberal-Labour candidate. The Independent Labour Party, despite not standing a candidate, held a meeting, calling on working men to free themselves from both established parties.

It was reported that the Conservatives accepted Mawdsley as a candidate on the assumption that if elected, he would be allowed to express his own views on trade union issues.

== Result ==
On polling day, the Conservatives were said to have been outnumbered by Liberals in the number of carriages conveying voters to the polls, by 130 to 90. Lady Randolph Churchill turned up in a striking blue dress and sunshade. Churchill himself tried to obtain a motor car from Coventry to bring voters to the polls, but it broke down at Stafford and never arrived. Polling closed at 8 pm.

Shortly after 11 pm the result was announced from the town hall:

By-election 1899: Oldham (2 seats)
Party	Candidate	Votes	%	±%
Liberal	Alfred Emmott	12,976	26.7	+2.1
Liberal	Walter Runciman	12,770	26.2	+2.0
Conservative	Winston Churchill	11,477	23.6	−2.6
Conservative	James Mawdsley	11,449	23.5	−1.5
Majority		1,527	3.2	N/A
Majority		1,410	2.6	N/A
Turnout		48,722	86.2	−1.3
Liberal gain from Conservative		Swing	+2.4	
Liberal gain from Conservative		Swing	+1.8	

== Aftermath ==
The loss of both seats caused some recriminations in Conservative circles. Henry Howorth, in a letter to The Times, took it as an object lesson that "playing at pitch and toss" with Conservative principles would not lead to a victory and that it was better that the party went into opposition than "surrender to every Socialistic demand".

Churchill had impressed as an election candidate, being described as "working like a Trojan". However, the correspondent for The Times felt that his speeches concentrated more on good phrases than on good arguments and that his popularity was superficial.

== See also ==
- 1925 Oldham by-election
