= 1968 Oldham West by-election =

UK parliamentary by-election

The 1968 Oldham West by-election for the British House of Commons seat of Oldham West took place on 13 June 1968, at a time when the Labour government of Harold Wilson was deeply unpopular. The election was caused by the resignation of Labour Member of Parliament (MP) Charles Leslie Hale for reasons of ill health. Hale had been an MP in the town since the 1945 general election.

This election took place in a two-year period during which Labour lost ten seats in by-elections, never with a swing of less than ten percent against them. Oldham West was convincingly gained for the Conservatives with a 17.7% swing by Bruce Campbell with a majority of 3,311 over the Labour candidate Michael Meacher. Meacher, a future minister both under Wilson and in the Blair government, would go on to recover the seat from Campbell in the 1970 general election: 1968-1970 was the only time in the post-World War II era that this division of Oldham was not represented by Labour. The Liberal Party, contesting the seat for the first time since 1951, finished in fourth place, while a creditable third place was gained by the former Liberal and celebrated novelist John Creasey.

Creasey two years previously had formed his own party of national unity, the short-lived All Party Alliance. He was joined on the campaign trail by the well-known actor Robert Beatty, and made effective use of local newspapers to promote his campaign. This was the third in a series of by-elections which he fought, and though his best result to date, it was to be his last. He stated after the election that he intended to stand in the constituency again in the next general election; however in 1970 he announced that he would not be doing so.

== Result ==
Oldham West by-election, 1968
Party	Candidate	Votes	%	±%
Conservative	Bruce Campbell	11,904	46.5	+7.7
Labour	Michael Meacher	8,593	33.6	−27.6
All Party Alliance	John Creasey	3,389	13.2	New
Liberal	David Green	1,707	6.7	New
Majority		3,311	12.9	N/A
Turnout		25,593		
Conservative gain from Labour		Swing	+17.7	
