= Hamilton Kerr =

British Conservative Party politician and journalist (1903–1974)

Sir Hamilton Kerr, Bt

Member of Parliament for Cambridge
- In office 1950–1966
- Preceded by: Arthur Symonds
- Succeeded by: Robert Davies

Member of Parliament for Oldham
- In office 1931–1945 Serving with Anthony Crossley (1931–1935); John Dodd (1935–1945)
- Preceded by: James Wilson; Gordon Lang
- Succeeded by: Leslie Hale; Frank Fairhurst

Personal details
- Born: Hamilton William Kerr; 1 August 1903
- Died: 24 December 1974 (aged 71)
- Political party: Conservative
- Relations: Charles Greville, 3rd Baron Greville (stepfather)
- Parent(s): Henry S. Kerr; Olive Grace Kerr
- Education: Eton College
- Alma mater: Balliol College, Oxford

Sir Hamilton William Kerr, 1st Baronet (1 August 1903 – 26 December 1974) was a British Conservative Party politician and journalist.

== Early life ==
Kerr was born on 1 August 1903. He was second son born to Americans Olive (née Grace) Kerr and banker Henry Scanlan Kerr of Long Island. After his father's death, his mother remarried to Charles Greville, shortly thereafter the 3rd Baron Greville. His older brother was Henry Grace Kerr, who was killed in France during World War I. His paternal grandparents were William Henry Kerr and Harriet Ellen (née Scanlan) Kerr. His mother was a niece of Michael P. Grace and Mayor William Russell Grace, founder of W. R. Grace and Company.

He was educated at Eton and Balliol College, Oxford.

== Career ==
After his graduation from Oxford, he then took up a career in journalism and worked on the Daily Mail and the Daily Telegraph.

At the 1931 general election, he was elected as the Member of Parliament for the Oldham constituency in Lancashire. He held the seat until losing it to Labour at the 1945 general election. In the 1930s, Kerr served as Parliamentary Private Secretary to Alfred Duff Cooper, starting in 1933 when Cooper was Financial Secretary to the War Office. During the Second World War, he served in a balloon squadron in the Royal Air Force and briefly held office as Parliamentary Secretary to the Ministry of Health in the 1945 caretaker government.

At the 1950 general election, he was returned to the House of Commons as the MP for Cambridge, holding that seat until his retirement at the 1966 general election. In 1954, Kerr was appointed Parliamentary Private Secretary to the future Prime Minister Harold Macmillan.

Kerr was made a Baronet, of Cambridge in the County of Cambridge, in 1957. The title became extinct upon his death in 1974.

== Legacy ==
The Hamilton Kerr Institute was established in 1976 in the riverside property given to Cambridge University for the Fitzwilliam Museum and endowed by Sir Hamilton Kerr. The HKI provides art conservation services and training.

Parliament of the United Kingdom
Preceded by James Wilson; Gordon Lang	Member of Parliament for Oldham; 1931–1945; With: Anthony Crossley, to 1935; John Dodd, (1935–1945)	Succeeded by Leslie Hale; Frank Fairhurst
Preceded by Arthur Symonds	Member of Parliament for Cambridge; 1950–1966	Succeeded by Robert Davies
Baronetage of the United Kingdom
New creation	Baronet (of Cambridge); 1957–1974	Extinct
