= Frank Fairhurst =

British politician (1892–1953)

Frank Fairhurst (1892 – 30 August 1953) was a British Labour Party politician.

Fairhurst was the Member of Parliament (MP) for Oldham from 1945 to 1950 and for Oldham East from 1950 to 1951.

Fairhurst also served as the president of National Association of Power Loom Overlookers, and as president of the Wigan Textile Trades Federation. He served on Wigan Town Council until his death.

Parliament of the United Kingdom
Preceded by John Dodd and Hamilton Kerr	Member of Parliament for Oldham; 1945–1950; With: Leslie Hale	Constituency abolished
New constituency	Member of Parliament for Oldham East; 1950–1951	Succeeded by Ian Horobin
