= John Dodd (Liberal politician) =

British politician

Sir John Samuel Dodd (13 October 1904 – 3 September 1973) was a British Liberal, then Liberal National politician.

He was educated at Uppingham, at Rouen, and at Christ's College, Cambridge University. In 1937 he married Margaret McDougall. He was an engineer. He was a director of the family business, William Dodd & Sons, textile machinists of Oldham. He was also a director of the Sun Cotton Mill at Oldham. He served for three years as a member of Oldham Town Council. He was Honorary Secretary for the Association of British Chamber of Commerce. He was also a Member of the Grand Council of the Federation of British Industries.

At the 1929 General Election he was a Liberal candidate for the dual-member constituency of Oldham. He finished fourth, behind the two successful Labour candidates and the Conservative candidate, but ahead of his Liberal running-mate.

He did not contest the 1931 General Election when the Oldham Conservatives decided to run two candidates and the Oldham Liberals chose not to contest the elections.

When the Liberal party split in 1931, Dodd joined the Liberal National, a group that aligned themselves with the Conservatives.

At the 1935 General Election the Oldham Conservatives, who were nominally defending both seats, decided to support Dodd, standing as a Liberal National, in tandem with one Conservative candidate. Dodd was elected, finishing second behind his Conservative running mate and ahead of two Labour and one Liberal candidate.

During the Second World War he was a Major in the 47th Royal Tank Regiment. Major Dodd was also Tank Production Advisor to the Ministry of Supply.

At the 1945 General Election the electoral arrangement between Dodd, standing again as a Liberal National and the Oldham Conservatives continued. However, this time Oldham Liberals ran two candidates, as did the Labour party. Dodd lost his seat, finishing fourth as Labour took both Oldham seats.

Parliament of the United Kingdom
Preceded by Anthony Crossley; Hamilton Kerr	Member of Parliament for Oldham; 1935 – 1945; With: Hamilton Kerr, 1935–1945	Succeeded by Leslie Hale; Frank Fairhurst

== Sources ==
- Who's Who of British Members of Parliament
