= Keith Mans =

British politician

Member of Parliament for Wyre
- In office 11 June 1987 – 8 April 1997
- Preceded by: Walter Clegg
- Succeeded by: constituency abolished

Personal details
- Born: 10 February 1946 (age 80)
- Party: Conservative
- Spouse: Rosalie McCann (m. 1972)
- Children: 3
- Education: RAF College Cranwell; Open University
- Military career
- Allegiance: United Kingdom
- Branch: Air Force; RAF Reserve
- Service years: 1964-2005

Keith Douglas Rowland Mans, AE FRAeS (born 10 February 1946) is a British Conservative Party politician.

Mans was Member of Parliament (MP) for Wyre from the 1987 general election until the seat was abolished by boundary changes for the 1997 general election. He stood in the new Lancaster and Wyre seat, but lost to Labour's Hilton Dawson.

== Early life and career ==
Mans was born the son of Major-General Rowland Spencer Noel Mans, CBE and Veeo Mans. He was educated at Berkhamsted School, the RAF College Cranwell and the Open University. He spent twelve years in the RAF, flying Vulcans and Canberras and 28 years flying with the RAF Reserve. Mans was a pilot in the RAF from 1964 to 1977 (Flight Lieutenant) and in the RAF Reserve from 1977 to 2005.

Before entering Parliament, Mans worked for the John Lewis Partnership, where he was a Retail Manager from 1978 to 1987.

== In Parliament ==
Mans was elected to Parliament in 1987. Whilst there, he founded and was the first Chairman of both the Parliamentary Environment Group and the Parliamentary Aerospace Group. He was also a member of the Environment Select Committee and the Defence Select Committee. Mans was Parliamentary Private Secretary to the Secretary of State for Health from 1991 to 1995, and Chairman of the Conservative Defence Committee in 1996.

== After Parliament ==
In 1998, following his election defeat, he took up an appointment as Chief Executive of the Royal Aeronautical Society, a post he held until 2009. While at the Royal Aeronautical Society, he was also Vice-Chairman of the Air League and Chairman of the Air Travel "Greener by Design" Initiative. Mans is now the Chairman of the Council of the Air League.

He has been the County Councillor for Lyndhurst on Hampshire County Council since 2009. From 2013 to 2019, he was the Deputy Leader of the Council, becoming Leader in 2019.

== Personal life ==
In 1972, Mans married Rosalie Mary McCann. They have a son and two daughters. In Who's Who, he lists his recreations as "flying". Mans is a member of the Royal Air Force Club.

Parliament of the United Kingdom
Preceded by Walter Clegg	Member of Parliament for Wyre; 1987–1997	Succeeded by (constituency abolished)
