= Richard Stanley (politician) =

British politician

The Honourable Richard Stanley

Member of Parliament for Fylde North
- In office 1950–1966
- Preceded by: Constituency established
- Succeeded by: Sir Walter Clegg

Personal details
- Born: 29 January 1920
- Died: 15 November 1983 (aged 63)
- Party: Conservative
- Spouse(s): Susan Aubrey-Fletcherr (m. 1965; died 1976) Mary Tylor (m. 1976)
- Parent: Edward Stanley (father)

The Hon. Richard Oliver Stanley (29 January 1920 – 15 November 1983) was a British Conservative Party Member of Parliament.

== Early life ==
Stanley attended Ludgrove School.

== Political career ==
Stanley represented Fylde North from 1950 general election until he stood down in 1966. He was from a powerful family, and was related to several Victorian prime ministers (Derby, Salisbury, Rosebery, and Balfour) and various other statesmen (the 15th, 16th, and 17th Earls of Derby, Clarendon, Hartington and Oliver Stanley). His father, Lord Stanley, had represented Fylde from 1922 to 1938. His successor was Sir Walter Clegg.

== Personal ==
Stanley was married twice, first from 1965 to 1976 (her death) to Susan Aubrey-Fletcher, daughter of Sir John Aubrey-Fletcher, 7th Baronet. He was married secondly after 1976 to Mary Tylor. He died childless.

Parliament of the United Kingdom
New constituency	Member of Parliament for Fylde North; 1950–1966	Succeeded by Sir Walter Clegg
