= Joshua Milne Cheetham =

British politician (1835–1902)

Member of Parliament for Oldham
- In office 1892–1895

Personal details
- Born: 22 May 1835 Shaw and Crompton, Greater Manchester, England
- Died: 27 November 1902 Eyford Park, Gloucestershire, England
- Party: Liberal
- Spouse: Sarah Crompton (m. 1862)

Joshua Milne Cheetham, JP, MP (22 May 1835 – 27 November 1902) was a British Member of Parliament.

== Biography ==
Cheetham was born in 1835 to James and Alice (née Greenwood) Cheetham of Crough House, Shaw and Crompton. Prior to his election to parliament, he ran the family firm James Cheetham and Sons, cotton manufacturers, in Oldham, and was Chairman of the Oldham Joint Stock Bank and a justice of the peace for Lancashire.

After contesting Oldham constituency unsuccessfully in 1886, he again took part in the July 1892 general election and was elected to the House of Commons for the Oldham constituency. He was a Liberal, and favoured Home Rule for Ireland and the Gladstonian programme in general. He sat in the House of Commons until his retirement in 1895.

Cheetham married in 1862 Sarah Crompton, daughter of Abram Crompton.

He died of pneumonia at his home at Eyford Park, Gloucestershire, age 67.

== See also ==
- List of MPs elected in the 1892 United Kingdom general election

Parliament of the United Kingdom
Preceded by James Mackenzie Maclean; Elliott Lees	Member of Parliament for Oldham; 1892–1895; With: J. T. Hibbert	Succeeded by Robert Ascroft; James Francis Oswald
