= Wyre (constituency) =

UK Parliament constituency (1983–1997)

Coordinates: 53.985°N 2.763°W

- Former county constituency for the House of Commons
- County: Lancashire

1983–1997
- Seats: One
- Created from: Fylde North
- Replaced by: Lancaster and Wyre

Wyre was a parliamentary constituency in the Wyre district of Lancashire. It returned one Member of Parliament (MP) to the House of Commons of the Parliament of the United Kingdom from 1983 until it was abolished for the 1997 general election. It was then partially replaced by the new constituency of Lancaster and Wyre.

== Boundaries ==
The Borough of Wyre wards of Bailey, Bourne, Breck, Carleton, Cleveleys Park, Hambleton, Hardhorn, High Cross, Jubilee, Mount, Norcross, Park, Pharos, Preesall, Rossall, Staina, Tithebarn, Victoria, and Warren.

== Members of Parliament ==
| Election | Member | Party |
|---|---|---|
| 1983 | Sir Walter Clegg | Conservative |
| 1987 | Keith Mans | Conservative |
| 1997 | constituency abolished | |

== Elections ==
=== Elections in the 1980s ===
General election 1983: Wyre
| Party | Candidate | Votes | % | ±% |
|---|---|---|---|---|
| Conservative | Walter Clegg | 26,559 | 56.4 | |
| SDP | Iain Murdoch | 11,748 | 25.0 | |
| Labour | William Goldsmith | 8,743 | 18.6 | |
| Majority | | 14,811 | 31.4 | |
| Turnout | | 47,050 | 71.4 | |
| Conservative win (new seat) | | | | |

General election 1987: Wyre
| Party | Candidate | Votes | % | ±% |
|---|---|---|---|---|
| Conservative | Keith Mans | 26,800 | 53.1 | −3.3 |
| SDP | Iain Murdoch | 12,139 | 24.0 | −1.0 |
| Labour | Paul Ainscough | 10,725 | 21.2 | +2.6 |
| Green | Arthur Brown | 874 | 1.7 | New |
| Majority | | 14,661 | 29.1 | −2.3 |
| Turnout | | 50,538 | 75.4 | +4.0 |
| Conservative hold | | Swing | −1.2 | |

=== Elections in the 1990s ===
General election 1992: Wyre
| Party | Candidate | Votes | % | ±% |
|---|---|---|---|---|
| Conservative | Keith Mans | 29,449 | 54.6 | +1.5 |
| Labour | David Borrow | 17,785 | 33.0 | +11.8 |
| Liberal Democrats | John Ault | 6,420 | 11.9 | −12.1 |
| Natural Law | Roger Perry | 260 | 0.5 | New |
| Majority | | 11,664 | 21.6 | −7.5 |
| Turnout | | 53,914 | 79.5 | +4.1 |
| Conservative hold | | Swing | −5.1 | |

== See also ==
- List of parliamentary constituencies in Lancashire
