= Oldham West =

Parliamentary constituency in the United Kingdom, 1950–1997

- Former borough constituency for the House of Commons
- Oldham West in Greater Manchester, showing boundaries used from 1983–1997

1950–1997
- Seats: one
- Created from: Oldham
- Replaced by: Oldham West and Royton; Ashton-under-Lyne

Oldham West was a parliamentary constituency centred on the town of Oldham in the north-west of Greater Manchester. It returned one Member of Parliament (MP) to the House of Commons of the Parliament of the United Kingdom.

The constituency was created for the 1950 general election, and abolished for the 1997 general election.

== Boundaries ==
Oldham West in Lancashire, boundaries used 1974–1983

1950–1983: The County Borough of Oldham wards of Coldhurst, Hartford, Hollinwood, Werneth, and Westwood, and the Urban District of Chadderton.

1983–1997: The Metropolitan Borough of Oldham wards of Chadderton Central, Chadderton North, Chadderton South, Failsworth East, Failsworth West, Hollinwood, and Werneth.

== Members of Parliament ==
| Election | Member | Party | Notes |
|---|---|---|---|
| 1950 | Leslie Hale | Labour | Previously MP for Oldham from 1945. Resigned May 1968 |
| 1968 by-election | Bruce Campbell | Conservative | |
| 1970 | Michael Meacher | Labour | Subsequently, MP for Oldham West and Royton |
| 1997 | constituency abolished | | |

== Elections ==
=== Elections in the 1950s ===
General election 1950: Oldham West
| Party | Candidate | Votes | % | ±% |
|---|---|---|---|---|
| Labour | Leslie Hale | 22,533 | 47.6 | |
| Conservative | Ian Horobin | 17,740 | 37.5 | |
| Liberal | James Taylor Middleton | 6,635 | 14.0 | |
| Communist | W. Mawdsley | 438 | 0.9 | |
| Majority | | 4,793 | 10.1 | |
| Turnout | | 47,346 | 85.1 | |
| Labour win (new seat) | | | | |

General election 1951: Oldham West
| Party | Candidate | Votes | % | ±% |
|---|---|---|---|---|
| Labour | Leslie Hale | 23,712 | 50.4 | +2.8 |
| Conservative | John Grigg | 19,517 | 41.5 | +4.0 |
| Liberal | Philip Fothergill | 3,823 | 8.1 | −5.9 |
| Majority | | 4,195 | 8.9 | −1.2 |
| Turnout | | 47,052 | 84.8 | −0.3 |
| Labour hold | | Swing | | |

General election 1955: Oldham West
| Party | Candidate | Votes | % | ±% |
|---|---|---|---|---|
| Labour | Leslie Hale | 23,164 | 54.6 | +4.2 |
| Conservative | John Grigg | 19,265 | 45.4 | +3.9 |
| Majority | | 3,899 | 9.2 | +0.3 |
| Turnout | | 42,429 | 78.1 | −7.7 |
| Labour hold | | Swing | | |

General election 1959: Oldham West
| Party | Candidate | Votes | % | ±% |
|---|---|---|---|---|
| Labour | Leslie Hale | 22,624 | 55.0 | +0.4 |
| Conservative | John Sutcliffe | 18,505 | 45.0 | −0.4 |
| Majority | | 4,119 | 10.0 | +0.8 |
| Turnout | | 41,129 | 79.3 | +1.2 |
| Labour hold | | Swing | | |

=== Elections in the 1960s ===
General election 1964: Oldham West
| Party | Candidate | Votes | % | ±% |
|---|---|---|---|---|
| Labour | Leslie Hale | 21,588 | 58.8 | +3.8 |
| Conservative | William Arthur Bromley-Davenport | 15,152 | 41.2 | −3.8 |
| Majority | | 6,436 | 17.6 | +7.6 |
| Turnout | | 36,740 | 75.1 | −4.2 |
| Labour hold | | Swing | | |

General election 1966: Oldham West
| Party | Candidate | Votes | % | ±% |
|---|---|---|---|---|
| Labour | Leslie Hale | 20,648 | 61.2 | +2.4 |
| Conservative | Bruce Campbell | 13,076 | 38.8 | −2.4 |
| Majority | | 7,572 | 22.4 | +4.8 |
| Turnout | | 33,724 | 72.4 | −2.7 |
| Labour hold | | Swing | | |

1968 Oldham West by-election
| Party | Candidate | Votes | % | ±% |
|---|---|---|---|---|
| Conservative | Bruce Campbell | 11,904 | 46.5 | +7.7 |
| Labour | Michael Meacher | 8,593 | 33.6 | −27.6 |
| All Party Alliance | John Creasey | 3,389 | 13.2 | New |
| Liberal | David Green | 1,707 | 6.7 | New |
| Majority | | 3,311 | 12.9 | N/A |
| Turnout | | 25,593 | | |
| Conservative gain from Labour | | Swing | +17.7 | |

=== Elections in the 1970s ===
General election 1970: Oldham West
| Party | Candidate | Votes | % | ±% |
|---|---|---|---|---|
| Labour | Michael Meacher | 16,062 | 48.1 | −13.1 |
| Conservative | Bruce Campbell | 14,387 | 43.1 | +4.3 |
| Liberal | Brian Lomax | 2,944 | 8.8 | New |
| Majority | | 1,675 | 5.0 | −17.4 |
| Turnout | | 33,393 | 67.0 | −5.4 |
| Labour hold | | Swing | | |

General election February 1974: Oldham West
| Party | Candidate | Votes | % | ±% |
|---|---|---|---|---|
| Labour | Michael Meacher | 17,933 | 48.4 | +0.3 |
| Conservative | David Trippier | 11,628 | 31.4 | −11.7 |
| Liberal | Anthony Limont | 7,505 | 20.3 | +11.5 |
| Majority | | 6,305 | 17.0 | +12.0 |
| Turnout | | 37,066 | 77.8 | +10.8 |
| Labour hold | | Swing | | |

General election October 1974: Oldham West
| Party | Candidate | Votes | % | ±% |
|---|---|---|---|---|
| Labour | Michael Meacher | 18,444 | 53.2 | +4.8 |
| Conservative | David Trippier | 10,407 | 30.0 | −1.4 |
| Liberal | K. Stocks | 5,838 | 16.8 | −3.5 |
| Majority | | 8,037 | 23.2 | +6.2 |
| Turnout | | 34,689 | 72.2 | −5.6 |
| Labour hold | | Swing | +3.1 | |

General election 1979: Oldham West
| Party | Candidate | Votes | % | ±% |
|---|---|---|---|---|
| Labour | Michael Meacher | 17,802 | 52.4 | −0.8 |
| Conservative | J. Smith | 12,025 | 35.4 | +5.4 |
| Liberal | K. Stocks | 3,604 | 10.6 | −6.2 |
| National Front | G. Halliwell | 515 | 1.5 | New |
| Majority | | 5,777 | 17.0 | −6.2 |
| Turnout | | 33,946 | 72.6 | +0.4 |
| Labour hold | | Swing | | |

=== Elections in the 1980s ===
General election 1983: Oldham West
| Party | Candidate | Votes | % | ±% |
|---|---|---|---|---|
| Labour | Michael Meacher | 17,690 | 44.1 | −8.3 |
| Conservative | David Dickinson | 14,510 | 36.2 | +0.8 |
| Liberal | Rodney A. M. Smith | 7,745 | 19.3 | +8.7 |
| Independent | James Street | 180 | 0.5 | New |
| Majority | | 3,180 | 7.9 | −9.1 |
| Turnout | | 40,125 | 69.9 | −2.7 |
| Labour hold | | Swing | | |

General election 1987: Oldham West
| Party | Candidate | Votes | % | ±% |
|---|---|---|---|---|
| Labour | Michael Meacher | 20,291 | 49.4 | +5.3 |
| Conservative | Joan Jacobs | 14,324 | 34.9 | −1.3 |
| Liberal | Mary Mason | 6,478 | 15.8 | −3.5 |
| Majority | | 5,967 | 14.5 | +6.6 |
| Turnout | | 41,093 | 71.9 | +2.0 |
| Labour hold | | Swing | | |

=== Elections in the 1990s ===
General election 1992: Oldham West
| Party | Candidate | Votes | % | ±% |
|---|---|---|---|---|
| Labour | Michael Meacher | 21,580 | 52.8 | +3.4 |
| Conservative | Jonathan Gillen | 13,247 | 32.4 | −2.5 |
| Liberal Democrats | John D. Smith | 5,525 | 13.5 | −2.3 |
| Natural Law | Sheila Dalling | 551 | 1.3 | New |
| Majority | | 8,333 | 20.4 | +5.9 |
| Turnout | | 40,903 | 75.6 | +3.7 |
| Labour hold | | Swing | +2.9 | |
