= Leslie Hale, Baron Hale =

British politician (1902–1985)

The Right Honourable The Lord Hale
- Born: Charles Leslie Hale; 13 July 1902
- Died: 9 May 1985 (aged 82)

Charles Leslie Hale, Baron Hale (13 July 1902 – 9 May 1985) was a British Liberal Party then Labour Party politician.

== Background ==
Hale was the son of Benjamin George Hale, a managing director. He went to the Ashby Grammar School and trained to be a solicitor in Leicester. Thereafter Hale practised first in his hometown Coalville, later in Nuneaton and finally in London.

== Career ==
Hale joined Leicestershire County Council in 1925, aged twenty-three. Four years later he contested Nottingham South unsuccessfully for the Liberal Party. Hale entered the British House of Commons as a Labour member in 1945, having been elected as one of the MPs in of the two-member constituency of Oldham. He represented this constituency until 1950, when it was abolished and split into two divisions. Hale was subsequently returned to Parliament for Oldham West, a seat he held for eighteen years until 1968, when he resigned for health reasons. On 24 April 1972, he was created a life peer with the title Baron Hale of Oldham.

Hale acted as the solicitor for the Spiritualists National Union, and spoke in Parliament for the repeal of the Witchcraft Act 1735 in favour of the Fraudulent Mediums Act.

== Family ==
In 1926 Hale married Dorothy Ann Latham; the couple had a son as well a daughter. He died in 1985.

== Works ==
- Thirty Who Were Tried; (1955)
- John Philpot Curran; (1958)
- Blood on the Scales; (1960)
- Hanged in Error; (1961)
- Hanging in the Balance; (1962)

== Notes ==
Parliament of the United Kingdom
Preceded by John Dodd; Hamilton Kerr	Member of Parliament for Oldham; 1945 – 1950; With: Frank Fairhurst	Constituency abolished
New constituency	Member of Parliament for Oldham West; 1950 – 1968	Succeeded by Bruce Campbell
