= James Francis Oswald =

British politician (1838–1908)

Oswald in 1895.

James Francis Oswald (1838–14 September 1908) was a British politician. He was elected as a Conservative Member of Parliament for Oldham in 1895, resigning in 1899 by becoming Steward of the Manor of Northstead.

Parliament of the United Kingdom
Preceded by J. T. Hibbert and Joshua Milne Cheetham	Member of Parliament for Oldham; 1895–1899; With: Robert Ascroft	Succeeded by Walter Runciman and Alfred Emmott
