= Ernest Hatch =

British Conservative turned Liberal MP (1859–1927)

- Hatch in 1895

Member of Parliament for Manchester Gorton
- In office 1895–1906

Personal details
- Born: 12 April 1859
- Died: 17 August 1927 (aged 68)
- Party: Conservative (1895-1904); Liberal (after 1904)
- Spouse: Lady Constance Blanche Godolphin Osborne

Sir Ernest Frederic George Hatch, 1st Baronet, KBE (12 April 1859 – 17 August 1927) was a British politician.

== Early life ==
He was the son of John William Hatch of London and Matilda Augusta Snell of Callington, Cornwall. Following a private education, he went into business as a wine merchant, and in 1894 established Hatch, Mansfield and Company, working with James Mansfield, who became managing director.

== Political career ==
Hatch was an unsuccessful Conservative parliamentary candidate for the Gorton Division of Lancashire at a by-election in 1889 and at the succeeding general election in 1892. On his third attempt, in the 1895 election, he was elected as Gorton's MP.

Hatch remained as Conservative member for Gorton until 1904, when his disagreement with Joseph Chamberlain over free trade led to him crossing the floor to the Liberal Party. At the next general election in 1906 he had little support from Liberal activists for his candidature, and accordingly withdrew.

In 1908 he was created a baronet, "of Portland Place, in the Metropolitan Borough of St Marylebone". He was appointed chairman and treasurer of University College Hospital, London

Escutcheon of the Hatch baronets of Portland Place

== First World War ==
During the First World War he chaired the Government Commission on Belgian Refugees, and was made a commander of the Belgian Order of the Crown. He was also Chairman of Council of the Beyond Seas Association for Reception of Officers and Relatives from beyond the seas, and for this he was appointed Knight Commander of the Order of the British Empire (KBE) in the 1920 New Year Honours.

== Personal life ==
Ernest Hatch married Lady Constance Blanche Godolphin Osborne in 1900 (daughter of George Osborne, 9th Duke of Leeds). They had one daughter, and the baronetcy became extinct on Sir Ernest's death in 1927.

== Footnotes ==
Parliament of the United Kingdom
Preceded by Sir William Mather	Member of Parliament for Gorton; 1895 – 1906	Succeeded by John Hodge
Baronetage of the United Kingdom
New creation	Baronet (of Portland Place, London); 1908–1927	Extinct
Preceded by Barker baronets	Hatch baronets of Portland Place; 2 December 1908	Succeeded by Clouston baronets
