= Walter Clegg =

British politician (1920–1994)

Sir Walter Clegg

Comptroller of the Household
- In office 1973–1974
- Preceded by: Bernard Weatherill
- Succeeded by: Joseph Harper

Vice-Chamberlain of the Household
- In office 1972–1973
- Preceded by: Bernard Weatherill
- Succeeded by: Paul Hawkins

Member of Parliament for Wyre Fylde North (1966-1983)
- In office 31 March 1966 – 18 May 1987
- Preceded by: Richard Stanley
- Succeeded by: Keith Mans

Personal details
- Born: 18 April 1920 Bury, Lancashire, England
- Died: 15 April 1994 (aged 73) Fleetwood, Lancashire, England
- Party: Conservative
- Spouse: Elise Hargreaves (m. 1951–1993, her death)
- Education: Manchester University
- Occupation: Member of Parliament

Sir Walter Clegg (18 April 1920 – 15 April 1994) was a British Conservative politician.

Clegg contested Ince in 1959 and was elected member of parliament for North Fylde in 1966. He became a Lord of the Treasury in 1970 and was successively Vice-Chamberlain of the Household in 1972 and Comptroller of the Household from 1973 to 1974. He was MP for Wyre from 1983 until his retirement in 1987.

== Personal life ==
Clegg was born on 18 April 1920 in Bury, Lancashire, the son of a weaver.

He was educated at Bury Grammar School, Blackpool's Arnold School and University of Manchester Law School. He became a solicitor in 1947, having qualified by a correspondence course conducted from a German prisoner-of-war camp during World War II while serving in the Royal Artillery. He later became a partner in the firm of Ingham, Clegg and Crowther, on North Albert Street in Fleetwood, Lancashire.

In 1951, Clegg began 42 years of marriage to Elise Hargreaves, who was working as a reporter at Blackpool's Evening Gazette. She was assigned to cover the proceedings at the local Magistrate's Court, where her future husband was defending a client.

In 1955 he was elected as a Lancashire County Councillor, serving until 1961.

Clegg was knighted in 1980.

In 1984, the Irish Republican Army bombed Brighton's Grand Hotel. Along with several other people, Clegg, whose bedroom was directly above the explosion, was badly hurt, and spent the majority of his later life in a wheelchair.

Until his wife's death in 1993, they lived together at Beech House on Raikes Road in Thornton, Lancashire.

== Death ==
Clegg died on 15 April 1994 in Fleetwood, aged 73.

Parliament of the United Kingdom
Preceded by Richard Stanley	Member of Parliament for North Fylde; 1966–1983	Succeeded by (constituency abolished)
Preceded by (new constituency)	Member of Parliament for Wyre; 1983–1987	Succeeded by Keith Mans
Political offices
Preceded by Bernard Weatherill	Vice-Chamberlain of the Household; 1972–1973	Succeeded by Paul Hawkins
Preceded by Bernard Weatherill	Comptroller of the Household; 1973–1974	Succeeded by Joseph Harper
