= James Mackenzie Maclean =

British journalist and Conservative politician

The Right Honourable James Mackenzie Maclean
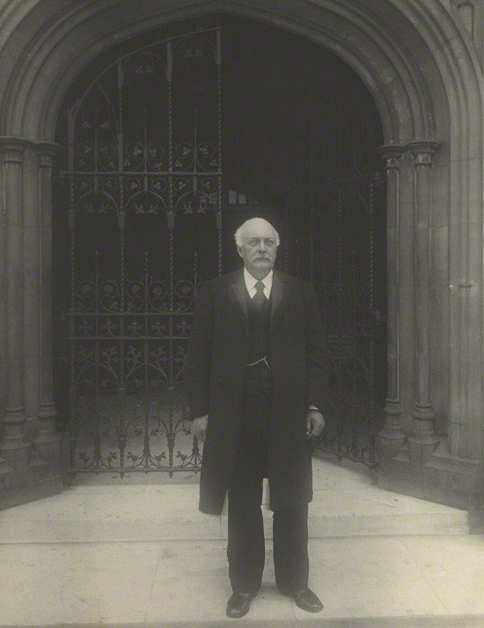

Member of Parliament for Oldham
- In office 1885–1892

Member of Parliament for Cardiff
- In office 1895–1900

Personal details
- Born: 13 August 1835
- Died: 22 April 1906 (aged 70)
- Party: Conservative
- Spouse: Anna Maria Whitehead

James Mackenzie Maclean (13 August 1835 – 22 April 1906) was a British journalist and Conservative politician who sat in the House of Commons between 1885 and 1900.

== History ==
Maclean was the youngest son of Alexander Maclean, of Liberton, Edinburgh and his wife Mary Baigrie, daughter of Mackenzie Baigrie. He went to India where he was a journalist. There, he owned and edited the Bombay Gazette. He was Chairman of the Bombay Town Council and was elected a Fellow of Bombay University. Maclean wrote a Guide to Bombay, in 1875 and various essays about India.

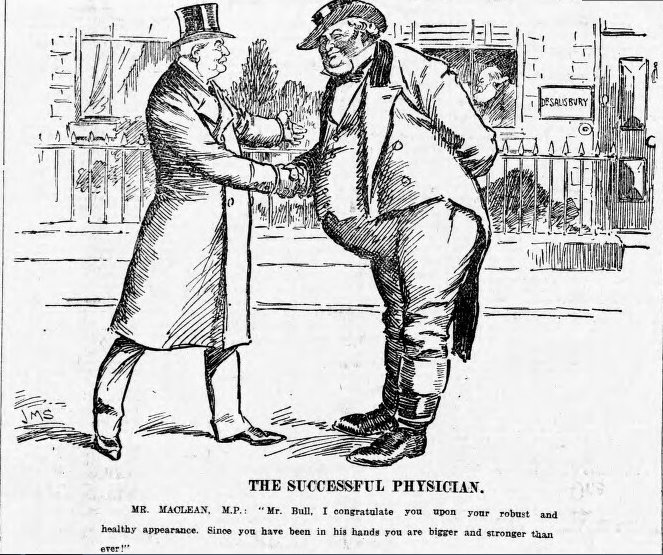
Maclean shown in an 1899 Western Mail cartoon by JM Staniforth

Maclean returned to Britain and stood unsuccessfully for Parliament at Elgin Burghs in 1880. In 1881 he was living at Malabar Villa Chiswick. He became a member of the Royal Society of Arts 1881, and served on its council from 1883 to 1886. He was active in the Society's Indian section and was awarded two silver medals for papers given to the Society. He also contributed to The Leader and was a proprietor of the Western Mail.

Maclean was elected as member of parliament for Oldham in 1885 until 1892. He was elected as Member of Parliament for Cardiff in 1895 until 1900.

Sir Richard Temple wrote "Maclean is undoubtedly a strong man who would have to be reckoned with...No man gives a greater impression of possessing reserve power. He is a man of Imperialistic mind, takes a very British view of everything in Foreign, Eastern, of Colonial affairs, and is much opposed to the Indian Congress and the advanced views of Young India... He has a tall, imposing figure, a handsome head and face and a fine voice." Sir George Birdwood wrote of Maclean in the Society of Arts Journal for 1901, that he was "the ablest publicist we ever had in India".

Mackenzie married Anna Maria Whitehead, daughter of Phillip Whitehead in 1867. Maclean died in 1906 and was buried at Old Chiswick Cemetery in London.

== Publications ==
- Mackenzie Maclean, James (1876). A Guide to Bombay: Historical, Statistical and Descriptive. Bombay Gazette Steam Press.
- Recollections of Westminster and India -1901
- Free trade with India: India's place in an imperial federation by James Mackenzie Maclean - 1904

Parliament of the United Kingdom
Preceded by J. T. Hibbert; Edward Stanley	Member of Parliament for Oldham; 1885–1892; With: J. T. Hibbert 1885–1886; Elliott Lees 1886–1892	Succeeded by J. T. Hibbert; Joshua Milne Cheetham
Preceded by Sir Edward Reed	Member of Parliament for Cardiff; 1895–1900	Succeeded by Sir Edward Reed
