= Bruce Campbell (barrister) =

New Zealand-born British lawyer, judge and politician

Campbell in 1968.

Keith Bruce Campbell QC (25 October 1916 – 1990) was a British circuit judge. As a barrister, he had earlier practised in family law, and during a brief Parliamentary career he also concentrated on family law issues. His term in office as a judge ended in scandal and enforced removal from office.

== Early life ==
Campbell was born in Christchurch, New Zealand and attended Christchurch Technical College and Canterbury University. He moved to London in the late 1930s to undertake postgraduate training at the University of London. In 1941 he was commissioned into the Royal Army Service Corps; he served in North Africa and Italy.

== Legal career ==
On demobilisation Campbell was called to the bar at the Inner Temple. He practised in family law, principally on the Northern circuit, and served on the Bar Council from 1956 to 1960 and from 1965 to 1970. He was appointed Queen's Counsel in 1964.

== By-election candidate ==
An active member of the Conservative Party, Campbell fought the seat of Manchester Gorton at the 1955 general election. He fought Oldham West in the 1966 election, and when the sitting Labour MP Leslie Hale announced his retirement due to ill health, Campbell was a natural choice for the local Conservative Association. The constituency's 1968 by-election campaign took place at a time when the Labour government of Harold Wilson was unpopular and Campbell criticised the government for cutting back on the motorway programmes and for their incomes policy. Many senior Conservatives travelled to Oldham to support Campbell, as a victory was thought possible.

== Parliament ==
In the by-election on 13 June 1968, Campbell gained a 17.7% swing and won the seat with a majority of 3,311. His maiden speech on 1 November concentrated on the problem of housing in his constituency. He was successful in the ballot for Private Members' Bills later that month and introduced a Bill to award state pensions to some widows who did not qualify due to insufficient National Insurance contributions. Campbell attacked divorce reform for allowing men to take advantage of their own wrong; he supported the idea of consensual divorce without the need to prove fault.

== Judicial career ==
Campbell lost his seat at the 1970 general election by 1,675 votes, and returned to the Bar where he had practiced occasionally while a Member of Parliament. He was elected a Master of the Bench of the Inner Temple in that year, and two years later was appointed a Recorder of the Crown Court. In January 1976, Campbell's sentence of a 31-year-old mother of a two-month-old baby to six months' imprisonment was criticised by the mother's MP Robert Kilroy-Silk. Campbell became a Circuit Judge later that year.

== Smuggling scandal ==
In 1983, Campbell's motor cruiser Papyrus was detained at Ramsgate by HM Customs & Excise, who removed 10 cases of whisky, 9,460 cigarettes and 500 grams of tobacco on which duty had not been paid. Campbell and the yacht's joint owner (a secondhand car dealer) were prosecuted for evading excise duty; when initially questioned Campbell claimed he had not brought the goods into the country and that they were only for his personal use. He later admitted that the goods had been bought in Guernsey. On 29 November he pleaded guilty and was fined £2,000; On 5 December 1983 the Lord Chancellor Lord Hailsham removed him from office for misbehaviour, an unprecedented sanction. There was a political row when Hailsham allowed Campbell to keep his judge's pension.

He died in Canterbury, Kent in 1990 aged 75.

Campbell's older son Andrew followed the legal profession and has been a Circuit Judge since 2004. Campbell's younger son Richard is the British actor Richard Campbell.
