= Elliott Lees =

British politician

Lees in 1895.

Lieutenant-Colonel Sir Elliott Lees, 1st Baronet, DSO (23 October 1860 – 16 October 1908), was a British Conservative Party politician.

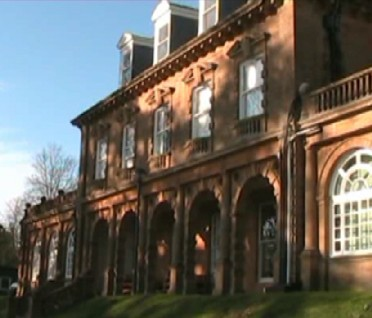
South Lytchett Manors South Face

Lees was educated at Eton and Christ Church, Oxford.

Lees was elected to the House of Commons for Oldham in 1886, a seat he held until 1892, and later represented Birkenhead from 1894 to 1906.

In 1897 he was created a Baronet, of South Lytchett Manor in Lytchett Minster in the County of Dorset.

Lees was an officer in the Dorsetshire Yeomanry. He volunteered for active service during the Second Boer War, and on 24 February 1900 was appointed a captain of the 26th (Dorsetshire) Company serving in the 7th Battalion, Imperial Yeomanry, which left England for South Africa on the SS Manchester Merchant in early March. He was mentioned in despatches and awarded the Distinguished Service Order (DSO) in November 1900. After his return to the United Kingdom he was appointed a supernumerary major of the regiment in January 1902.

Lees married Florence Keith, daughter of Patrick Keith, in 1882. He died in October 1908, aged 47, and was succeeded in the baronetcy by his eldest son Thomas. Lady Lees died in 1917.

== Notes ==
Parliament of the United Kingdom
Preceded by J. T. Hibbert; James Mackenzie Maclean	Member of Parliament for Oldham; 1886–1892; With: James Mackenzie Maclean	Succeeded by Joshua Milne Cheetham; Sir J. T. Hibbert
Preceded by Viscount Bury	Member of Parliament for Birkenhead; 1894–1906	Succeeded by Henry Vivian
Baronetage of the United Kingdom
New creation	Baronet (of South Lytchett Heath Manor); 1897–1908	Succeeded by Thomas Evans Keith Lees
