= Robert Ascroft =

Ascroft in 1895.

Robert Ascroft, JP. MP, (1847 – 19 June 1899) was a prominent Lancashire solicitor and an English politician.

Ascroft was educated at Lancaster Royal Grammar School, before becoming a solicitor in 1869.

He entered the House of Commons on 13 July 1895 and was one of the two Members of Parliament for Oldham between 1895 until his death, as a member of the Conservative Party. He was known as the "Workers' Friend" and after his death, a public subscription enabled a statue of him to be erected in Alexandra Park, Oldham.

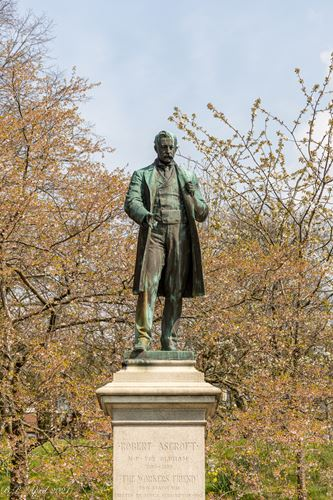
Statue of Robert Ascroft MP at Alexandra Park

Robert Ascroft is mentioned in Chapter XVII of Sir Winston Churchill's book 'My Early Life'. In the seventeenth chapter, entitled 'Oldham', Mr Churchill recalls the day where Mr Ascroft, MP for Oldham, talked to him about running the constituency together. Oldham was a two-member constituency and evidently, Mr Ascroft believed the young Winston -a war hero and celebrity- was ripe for the job.

Parliament of the United Kingdom
Preceded by Joshua Milne Cheetham and J. T. Hibbert	Member of Parliament for Oldham; 1895–1899; With: James Francis Oswald	Succeeded by Alfred Emmott and Walter Runciman
