= Nall =

Nall may refer to:

== People ==
- Anita Nall (born 1976), American swimmer
- Charles Nall-Cain (disambiguation), 1st and 3rd Baron Brocket
- Craig Nall (born 1979), American football player
- Fred Nall Hollis (born 1948), American artist known as "Nall"
- Gus Nall (1919–1995), American painter
- Joseph Nall (1887–1958), 1st Nall baronet
- Loretta Nall (born 20th century), founder of US Marijuana Party
- Rashaan Nall (born 1980), American writer, director etc.
- Ronald Nall-Cain (1904–1967), 2nd Baron Brocket
- Ryan Nall (born 1995), American football player
- Nall baronets

== Places ==
- Nall River, river in Balochistan, Pakistan
