= Chorlton (ward) =

Electoral division of Manchester, England

- Ward
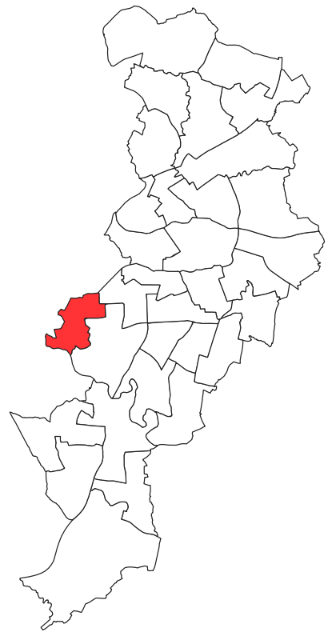
- Chorlton ward (2018) within Manchester

- Coat of arms
- Interactive map of Chorlton
- Country: United Kingdom
- Constituent country: England
- Region: North West England
- County: Greater Manchester
- Metropolitan borough: Manchester
- Created: November 1904
- Named for: Chorlton-cum-Hardy

Government
  - Type: Unicameral
  - Body: Manchester City Council
- UK Parliamentary Constituency: Manchester Rusholme, Manchester Withington

Chorlton, formerly Chorlton-cum-Hardy, is an electoral division of Manchester City Council which has been represented since 1904. It covers the greater part of the suburb of Chorlton-cum-Hardy.

== Overview ==
Chorlton-cum-Hardy ward was created in 1904, as a result of the Manchester Extension Scheme 1904, which transferred the urban districts of Moss Side and Withington to the Manchester corporation. Initially, the ward's boundaries corresponded with those of the Chorlton-cum-Hardy and Whalley Range wards of the former Withington Urban District, these boundaries were not affected by a city-wide boundary revision in 1919. In 1950, that part of the ward to the east of Egerton Road North was transferred to the new Alexandra Park ward. After a further boundary revision in 1971, its name was shortened to Chorlton and its eastern boundary became the disused Manchester South District Railway, these boundaries were left unchanged by another city-wide boundary revision in 1982. In 2004, that part of the ward to the south of Wilbraham Road and to the east of Barlow Moor Road was transferred to the new Chorlton Park ward. The ward's boundaries were left largely unchanged at the latest revision in 2018.

From its creation until 1918, the ward formed part of the Stretford Parliamentary constituency. From 1918 until 1950, it was part of the Manchester Withington Parliamentary constituency. From 1950 until 1983, it was part of the Manchester Moss Side Parliamentary constituency. Since 1983, most of the ward has returned to the Manchester Withington Parliamentary Constituency; however, as of 2024, that part of the ward to the east of Egerton Road North forms part of the Manchester Rusholme Parliamentary Constituency.

== Councillors ==
| Election | Councillor | Councillor | Councillor |
|---|---|---|---|
| 1904 | J. Turner (Con) | E. Farrar (Ind) | H. Kemp (Lib) |
| 1905 | J. Turner (Con) | E. Farrar (Ind) | H. Kemp (Lib) |
| 1906 | J. Turner (Con) | E. Farrar (Ind) | H. Kemp (Lib) |
| 190 | J. Turner (Con) | E. Farrar (Ind) | H. Kemp (Lib) |
| 1908 | J. Turner (Con) | E. Farrar (Ind) | H. Kemp (Lib) |
| 1909 | J. Turner (Con) | E. Farrar (Ind) | H. Kemp (Lib) |
| March 1910 | J. Turner (Con) | A. Thomson (Lib) | H. Kemp (Lib) |
| 1910 | J. Turner (Con) | A. Thomson (Lib) | H. Kemp (Lib) |
| November 1910 | J. Turner (Con) | G. Howarth (Lib) | H. Kemp (Lib) |
| 1911 | J. Turner (Con) | G. Howarth (Lib) | J. Redford (Ind) |
| 1912 | J. Turner (Con) | J. C. Booth (Con) | J. Redford (Ind) |
| 1913 | J. Turner (Con) | J. C. Booth (Con) | J. Redford (Ind) |
| 1914 | J. Turner (Con) | J. C. Booth (Con) | J. Redford (Ind) |
| 1919 | J. Turner (Con) | W. E. Davies (Lib) | J. Redford (Lib) |
| February 1920 | J. W. G. Coombs (Con) | W. E. Davies (Lib) | J. Redford (Lib) |
| June 1920 | S. T. Rowe (Con) | W. E. Davies (Lib) | J. Redford (Lib) |
| 1920 | S. T. Rowe (Con) | W. E. Davies (Lib) | J. Redford (Lib) |
| 1921 | S. T. Rowe (Con) | W. E. Davies (Lib) | J. Lees-Jones (Con) |
| 1922 | S. T. Rowe (Con) | W. E. Davies (Lib) | J. Lees-Jones (Con) |
| 1923 | S. T. Rowe (Con) | W. E. Davies (Lib) | J. Lees-Jones (Con) |
| 1924 | S. T. Rowe (Con) | W. E. Davies (Lib) | S. D. Simon (Lib) |
| 1925 | S. T. Rowe (Con) | W. T. Burrows (Con) | S. D. Simon (Lib) |
| 1926 | J. W. Maitland (Lib) | W. T. Burrows (Con) | S. D. Simon (Lib) |
| 1927 | J. W. Maitland (Lib) | W. T. Burrows (Con) | S. D. Simon (Lib) |
| 1928 | J. W. Maitland (Lib) | W. T. Burrows (Con) | S. D. Simon (Lib) |
| December 1928 | J. W. Maitland (Lib) | W. Somerville (Con) | S. D. Simon (Lib) |
| 1929 | J. W. Maitland (Lib) | W. Somerville (Con) | S. D. Simon (Lib) |
| 1930 | J. W. Maitland (Lib) | W. Somerville (Con) | S. D. Simon (Lib) |
| 1931 | J. W. Maitland (Lib) | W. Somerville (Con) | S. D. Simon (Lib) |
| 1932 | J. W. Maitland (Lib) | W. Somerville (Con) | S. D. Simon (Lib) |
| 1933 | J. W. Maitland (Lib) | W. Somerville (Con) | J. Watts (Con) |
| 1934 | J. W. Maitland (Lib) | W. Somerville (Con) | J. Watts (Con) |
| 1935 | N. Beith (Con) | W. Somerville (Con) | J. Watts (Con) |
| 1936 | N. Beith (Con) | W. Somerville (Con) | J. Watts (Con) |
| 1937 | N. Beith (Con) | W. Somerville (Con) | J. Watts (Con) |
| 1938 | H. Strange (Con) | W. Somerville (Con) | J. Watts (Con) |
| 1945 | R. Turley (Con) | W. Somerville (Con) | M. S. Whittaker (Con) |
| 1946 | R. Turley (Con) | W. Somerville (Con) | M. S. Whittaker (Con) |
| 1947 | R. Turley (Con) | W. Somerville (Con) | M. S. Whittaker (Con) |
| March 1949 | R. Turley (Con) | G. W. G. Fitzsimons (Con) | M. S. Whittaker (Con) |
| 1949 | R. Turley (Con) | G. W. G. Fitzsimons (Con) | M. S. Whittaker (Con) |
| November 1949 | A. Wood (Con) | G. W. G. Fitzsimons (Con) | M. S. Whittaker (Con) |
| 1950 | A. Wood (Con) | G. W. G. Fitzsimons (Con) | M. S. Whittaker (Con) |
| 1951 | A. Wood (Con) | G. W. G. Fitzsimons (Con) | M. S. Whittaker (Con) |
| 1952 | A. Wood (Con) | G. W. G. Fitzsimons (Con) | M. S. Whittaker (Con) |
| 1953 | A. Wood (Con) | G. W. G. Fitzsimons (Con) | M. S. Whittaker (Con) |
| 1954 | S. Ralphs (Con) | G. W. G. Fitzsimons (Con) | M. S. Whittaker (Con) |
| 1955 | S. Ralphs (Con) | G. W. G. Fitzsimons (Con) | M. S. Whittaker (Con) |
| 1956 | S. Ralphs (Con) | G. W. G. Fitzsimons (Con) | M. S. Whittaker (Con) |
| 1957 | S. Ralphs (Con) | G. W. G. Fitzsimons (Con) | M. S. Whittaker (Con) |
| 1958 | S. Ralphs (Con) | G. W. G. Fitzsimons (Con) | M. S. Whittaker (Con) |
| 1959 | S. Ralphs (Con) | G. W. G. Fitzsimons (Con) | M. S. Whittaker (Con) |
| 1960 | S. Ralphs (Con) | G. W. G. Fitzsimons (Con) | M. S. Whittaker (Con) |
| 1961 | S. Ralphs (Con) | G. W. G. Fitzsimons (Con) | M. S. Whittaker (Con) |
| 1962 | S. Ralphs (Con) | G. W. G. Fitzsimons (Con) | M. S. Whittaker (Con) |
| 1963 | S. Ralphs (Con) | G. W. G. Fitzsimons (Con) | M. S. Whittaker (Con) |
| 1964 | S. Ralphs (Con) | G. W. G. Fitzsimons (Con) | L. Sanders (Con) |
| 1965 | S. Ralphs (Con) | G. W. G. Fitzsimons (Con) | L. Sanders (Con) |
| June 1965 | M. A. Vince (Con) | G. W. G. Fitzsimons (Con) | L. Sanders (Con) |
| 1966 | M. A. Vince (Con) | G. W. G. Fitzsimons (Con) | L. Sanders (Con) |
| March 1967 | M. A. Vince (Con) | A. D. Ashley (Con) | L. Sanders (Con) |
| 1967 | M. A. Vince (Con) | A. D. Ashley (Con) | L. Sanders (Con) |
| 1968 | M. A. Vince (Con) | A. D. Ashley (Con) | L. Sanders (Con) |
| 1969 | M. A. Vince (Con) | A. D. Ashley (Con) | L. Sanders (Con) |
| 1970 | M. A. Vince (Con) | A. D. Ashley (Con) | L. Sanders (Con) |
| 1971 | L. Sanders (Con) | M. A. Vince (Con) | M. Delavan (Con) |
| 1972 | L. Sanders (Con) | M. A. Vince (Con) | M. Delavan (Con) |
| 1973 | L. Sanders (Con) | M. A. Vince (Con) | A. D. Ashley (Con) |
| 1975 | L. Sanders (Con) | M. A. Vince (Con) | C. Franks (Con) |
| 1976 | L. Sanders (Con) | M. A. Vince (Con) | C. Franks (Con) |
| 1978 | L. Sanders (Con) | M. A. Vince (Con) | C. Franks (Con) |
| 1979 | L. Sanders (Con) | M. A. Vince (Con) | C. Franks (Con) |
| 1980 | L. Sanders (Con) | M. A. Vince (Con) | C. Franks (Con) |
| 1982 | L. Sanders (Con) | M. A. Vince (Con) | C. Franks (Con) |
| 1983 | L. Sanders (Con) | M. A. Vince (Con) | C. Franks (Con) |
| 1984 | L. Sanders (Con) | E. Walker (Con) | M. Davies (Con) |
| 1986 | D. Black (Lab) | E. Walker (Con) | M. Davies (Con) |
| 1987 | D. Black (Lab) | E. Walker (Con) | D. Kielthy (Con) |
| 1988 | D. Black (Lab) | A. Tomlinson (Lab) | D. Kielthy (Con) |
| 1990 | D. Black (Lab) | A. Tomlinson (Lab) | D. Kielthy (Con) |
| 1991 | B. D. Selby (Lab) | A. Tomlinson (Lab) | C. M. Rogers (Lab) |
| 1992 | B. D. Selby (Lab) | M. Langford (Lab) | C. M. Rogers (Lab) |
| April 1993 | B. D. Selby (Lab) | M. Langford (Lab) | G. Betney (Lab) |
| 1994 | B. D. Selby (Lab) | M. Langford (Lab) | G. Betney (Lab) |
| 1995 | B. D. Selby (Lab) | M. Langford (Lab) | V. Stevens (Lab) |
| 1996 | B. D. Selby (Lab) | M. Humphreys (Lab) | V. Stevens (Lab) |
| 1998 | B. D. Selby (Lab) | M. Humphreys (Lab) | V. Stevens (Lab) |
| 1999 | B. D. Selby (Lab) | V. Stevens (Lab) | S. Newman (Lab) |
| 2000 | B. D. Selby (Lab) | V. Stevens (Lab) | S. Newman (Lab) |
| 2002 | B. D. Selby (Lab) | V. Stevens (Lab) | S. Newman (Lab) |
| 2003 | B. D. Selby (Lab) | V. Stevens (Lab) | S. Newman (Lab) |
| 2004 | Sheila Newman (Lab) | Angela Gallagher (Lib Dem) | Val Stevens (Lab) |
| 2006 | Sheila Newman (Lab) | Angela Gallagher (Lib Dem) | Val Stevens (Lab) |
| August 2006 | Sheila Newman (Lab) | Angela Gallagher (Lab) | Val Stevens (Lab) |
| 2007 | Sheila Newman (Lab) | Paul Ankers (Lib Dem) | Val Stevens (Lab) |
| 2008 | Sheila Newman (Lab) | Paul Ankers (Lib Dem) | Val Stevens (Lab) |
| 2010 | Sheila Newman (Lab) | Paul Ankers (Lib Dem) | Victor Chamberlain (Lib Dem) |
| 2011 | Sheila Newman (Lab) | Matthew Strong (Lab) | Victor Chamberlain (Lib Dem) |
| 2012 | Sheila Newman (Lab) | Matthew Strong (Lab) | Victor Chamberlain (Lib Dem) |
| 2014 | Sheila Newman (Lab) | Matthew Strong (Lab) | John Hacking (Lab) |
| 2015 | Sheila Newman (Lab) | Matthew Strong (Lab) | John Hacking (Lab) |
| 2016 | Sheila Newman (Lab) | Matthew Strong (Lab) | John Hacking (Lab) |
| 2018 | John Hacking (Lab) | Eve Holt (Lab) | Matthew Strong (Lab) |
| 2019 | John Hacking (Lab) | Eve Holt (Lab) | Matthew Strong (Lab) |
| 2021 | John Hacking (Lab) | Eve Holt (Lab) | Matthew Strong (Lab) |
| November 2021 | John Hacking (Lab) | Eve Holt (Lab) | Mathew Benham (Lab) |
| 2022 | John Hacking (Lab) | Eve Holt (Lab) | Mathew Benham (Lab) |
| 2023 | John Hacking (Lab) | Eve Holt (Lab) | Mathew Benham (Lab) |
| 2024 | John Hacking (Lab) | Tina Kirwin-McGinley (Lab) | Mathew Benham (Lab) |
| 2026 | Chantal Kerr-Sheppard (Grn) | Tina Kirwin-McGinley (Lab) | Mathew Benham (Lab) |

== Elections ==
=== Elections in 1900s ===
==== November 1904 ====
1904 (3 vacancies)
| Party | Candidate | Votes | % | ±% |
|---|---|---|---|---|
| Conservative | J. Turner | 994 | 61.5 | |
| Independent | E. Farrar | 873 | 54.1 | |
| Liberal | H. Kemp | 816 | 50.5 | |
| Liberal | R. B. Barningham | 749 | 46.4 | |
| Conservative | T. Wilson | 721 | 44.6 | |
| Liberal | H. Pilcher | 690 | 42.7 | |
| Majority | | 67 | 4.1 | |
| Turnout | | 1,615 | | |
| Conservative win (new seat) | | | | |
| Independent win (new seat) | | | | |
| Liberal win (new seat) | | | | |

==== November 1905 ====
1905
| Party | Candidate | Votes | % | ±% |
|---|---|---|---|---|
| Liberal | H. Kemp* | 878 | 51.9 | +1.4 |
| Conservative | T. Wilson | 813 | 48.1 | −13.4 |
| Majority | | 65 | 3.8 | −0.3 |
| Turnout | | 1,691 | | |
| Liberal hold | | Swing | | |

==== November 1905 ====
1905
| Party | Candidate | Votes | % | ±% |
|---|---|---|---|---|
| Liberal | H. Kemp* | 878 | 51.9 | +1.4 |
| Conservative | T. Wilson | 813 | 48.1 | −13.4 |
| Majority | | 65 | 3.8 | −0.3 |
| Turnout | | 1,691 | | |
| Liberal hold | | Swing | | |

==== November 1906 ====
1906
| Party | Candidate | Votes | % | ±% |
|---|---|---|---|---|
| Independent | E. Farrar* | uncontested | | |
| Independent hold | | Swing | | |

==== November 1907 ====
1907
| Party | Candidate | Votes | % | ±% |
|---|---|---|---|---|
| Conservative | J. Turner* | 1,243 | 60.6 | N/A |
| Liberal | A. Thomson | 807 | 39.4 | N/A |
| Majority | | 436 | 21.2 | N/A |
| Turnout | | 2,050 | | |
| Conservative hold | | Swing | | |

==== November 1908 ====
1908
| Party | Candidate | Votes | % | ±% |
|---|---|---|---|---|
| Liberal | H. Kemp* | uncontested | | |
| Liberal hold | | Swing | | |

==== November 1909 ====
1909
| Party | Candidate | Votes | % | ±% |
|---|---|---|---|---|
| Independent | E. Farrar* | uncontested | | |
| Independent hold | | Swing | | |

=== Elections in 1910s ===
==== March 1910 (by-election) ====
By-election: 8 March 1910
| Party | Candidate | Votes | % | ±% |
|---|---|---|---|---|
| Liberal | A. Thomson | 1,001 | 53.0 | N/A |
| Conservative | T. J. Bushell | 887 | 47.0 | N/A |
| Majority | | 114 | 6.0 | N/A |
| Turnout | | 1,888 | | |
| Liberal gain from Independent | | Swing | | |

==== November 1910 ====
1910
| Party | Candidate | Votes | % | ±% |
|---|---|---|---|---|
| Conservative | J. Turner* | uncontested | | |
| Conservative hold | | Swing | | |

==== November 1910 (by-election) ====
By-election: 21 November 1910
| Party | Candidate | Votes | % | ±% |
|---|---|---|---|---|
| Liberal | G. Howarth* | 1,206 | 67.1 | N/A |
| Independent | W. Stanway | 591 | 32.9 | N/A |
| Majority | | 615 | 34.2 | N/A |
| Turnout | | 1,797 | | |
| Liberal hold | | Swing | | |

==== November 1911 ====
1911
| Party | Candidate | Votes | % | ±% |
|---|---|---|---|---|
| Independent | J. Redford* | 1,504 | 60.2 | N/A |
| Conservative | P. Macbeth | 996 | 39.8 | N/A |
| Majority | | 508 | 20.4 | N/A |
| Turnout | | 2,500 | | |
| Independent hold | | Swing | | |

==== November 1912 ====
1912
| Party | Candidate | Votes | % | ±% |
|---|---|---|---|---|
| Conservative | J. C. Booth | 1,407 | 50.4 | +10.6 |
| Liberal | G. Howarth* | 1,383 | 49.6 | N/A |
| Majority | | 24 | 0.8 | |
| Turnout | | 2,790 | | |
| Conservative gain from Liberal | | Swing | | |

==== November 1913 ====
1913
| Party | Candidate | Votes | % | ±% |
|---|---|---|---|---|
| Conservative | J. Turner* | uncontested | | |
| Conservative hold | | Swing | | |

==== November 1914 ====
1914
| Party | Candidate | Votes | % | ±% |
|---|---|---|---|---|
| Independent | J. Redford* | uncontested | | |
| Independent hold | | Swing | | |

==== November 1919 ====
1919 (new boundaries)
| Party | Candidate | Votes | % | ±% |
|---|---|---|---|---|
| Liberal | W. E. Davies | 3,414 | 67.0 | |
| Conservative | J. C. Booth* | 1,685 | 33.0 | |
| Majority | | 1,729 | 33.9 | |
| Turnout | | 5,099 | 37.3 | |
| Liberal gain from Conservative | | Swing | | |

=== Elections in 1920s ===
==== February 1920 (by-election) ====
By-election: 21 February 1920
| Party | Candidate | Votes | % | ±% |
|---|---|---|---|---|
| Conservative | J. W. G. Coombs | 2,119 | 50.8 | +17.8 |
| Liberal | J. H. Dawson | 2,049 | 49.2 | −17.8 |
| Majority | | 70 | 1.6 | |
| Turnout | | 4,168 | 30.5 | −6.8 |
| Conservative hold | | Swing | | |

==== June 1920 (by-election) ====
By-election: 15 June 1920
| Party | Candidate | Votes | % | ±% |
|---|---|---|---|---|
| Conservative | S. T. Rowe | 2,992 | 60.4 | +9.6 |
| Liberal | J. H. Dawson | 1,965 | 39.6 | −9.6 |
| Majority | | 1,027 | 20.8 | +19.2 |
| Turnout | | 4,957 | 36.3 | +5.8 |
| Conservative hold | | Swing | | |

==== November 1920 ====
1920
| Party | Candidate | Votes | % | ±% |
|---|---|---|---|---|
| Conservative | S. T. Rowe* | uncontested | | |
| Conservative hold | | Swing | | |

==== November 1921 ====
1921
| Party | Candidate | Votes | % | ±% |
|---|---|---|---|---|
| Conservative | J. Lees-Jones | 3,526 | 56.3 | N/A |
| Liberal | J. Redford* | 2,742 | 43.7 | N/A |
| Majority | | 784 | 12.6 | N/A |
| Turnout | | 6,268 | 48.7 | N/A |
| Conservative gain from Liberal | | Swing | | |

==== November 1922 ====
1922
| Party | Candidate | Votes | % | ±% |
|---|---|---|---|---|
| Liberal | W. E. Davies* | 3,500 | 53.1 | +9.4 |
| Conservative | A. E. Bowen | 3,086 | 46.9 | −9.4 |
| Majority | | 414 | 6.2 | |
| Turnout | | 6,586 | 48.4 | −0.3 |
| Liberal hold | | Swing | | |

==== November 1923 ====
1923
| Party | Candidate | Votes | % | ±% |
|---|---|---|---|---|
| Conservative | S. T. Rowe* | 4,537 | 51.2 | +4.3 |
| Liberal | S. D. Simon | 4,321 | 48.8 | −4.3 |
| Majority | | 216 | 2.4 | |
| Turnout | | 8,858 | | |
| Conservative hold | | Swing | | |

==== November 1924 ====
1924
| Party | Candidate | Votes | % | ±% |
|---|---|---|---|---|
| Liberal | S. D. Simon | 5,113 | 53.0 | +4.2 |
| Conservative | J. Lees-Jones* | 4,534 | 47.0 | −4.2 |
| Majority | | 579 | 6.0 | |
| Turnout | | 9,647 | | |
| Liberal gain from Conservative | | Swing | | |

==== November 1925 ====
1925
| Party | Candidate | Votes | % | ±% |
|---|---|---|---|---|
| Conservative | W. T. Burrows | 4,888 | 51.9 | +4.9 |
| Liberal | W. E. Davies* | 4,308 | 45.7 | −7.3 |
| Residents | N. E. Walker | 224 | 2.4 | N/A |
| Majority | | 580 | 6.2 | |
| Turnout | | 9,420 | 58.3 | |
| Conservative gain from Liberal | | Swing | | |

==== November 1926 ====
1926
| Party | Candidate | Votes | % | ±% |
|---|---|---|---|---|
| Liberal | J. W. Maitland | 3,783 | 51.0 | +4.3 |
| Conservative | W. Somerville | 3,640 | 49.0 | −2.9 |
| Majority | | 143 | 2.0 | |
| Turnout | | 7,423 | 42.6 | −15.7 |
| Liberal gain from Conservative | | Swing | | |

==== November 1927 ====
1927
| Party | Candidate | Votes | % | ±% |
|---|---|---|---|---|
| Liberal | S. D. Simon* | 5,978 | 61.3 | +10.3 |
| Conservative | C. A. Toyn | 3,649 | 37.4 | −11.6 |
| Independent | H. Green | 130 | 1.3 | N/A |
| Majority | | 2,329 | 23.9 | +21.9 |
| Turnout | | 9,757 | 53.2 | +10.6 |
| Liberal hold | | Swing | | |

==== November 1928 ====
1928
| Party | Candidate | Votes | % | ±% |
|---|---|---|---|---|
| Conservative | W. T. Burrows* | 4,788 | 46.7 | +9.3 |
| Liberal | S. F. Wicks | 3,955 | 38.6 | −22.7 |
| Labour | A. McIlwrick | 1,457 | 14.2 | N/A |
| Residents | N. E. Walker | 51 | 0.5 | N/A |
| Majority | | 833 | 8.1 | |
| Turnout | | 10,251 | 54.0 | +0.8 |
| Conservative hold | | Swing | | |

==== December 1928 (by-election) ====
By-election: 20 December 1928
| Party | Candidate | Votes | % | ±% |
|---|---|---|---|---|
| Conservative | W. Somerville | 2,840 | 51.5 | +4.8 |
| Liberal | S. Pilling | 1,985 | 36.0 | −2.6 |
| Labour | A. McIlwrick | 684 | 12.4 | −1.8 |
| Residents | A. R. Edwards | 10 | 0.1 | −0.4 |
| Majority | | 855 | 15.5 | +7.4 |
| Turnout | | 5,519 | 29.1 | −24.9 |
| Conservative hold | | Swing | | |

==== November 1929 ====
1929
| Party | Candidate | Votes | % | ±% |
|---|---|---|---|---|
| Liberal | J. W. Maitland* | 3,711 | 52.8 | +14.2 |
| Conservative | J. Lees-Jones | 3,321 | 47.2 | +0.5 |
| Majority | | 390 | 5.6 | |
| Turnout | | 7,032 | 34.4 | −19.6 |
| Liberal hold | | Swing | | |

=== Elections in 1930s ===
==== November 1930 ====
1930
| Party | Candidate | Votes | % | ±% |
|---|---|---|---|---|
| Liberal | S. D. Simon* | 6,286 | 87.5 | +34.7 |
| Labour | E. Topham | 840 | 11.7 | N/A |
| Residents | A. M. Edwards | 61 | 0.8 | N/A |
| Majority | | 5,446 | 75.8 | +70.2 |
| Turnout | | 7,187 | | |
| Liberal hold | | Swing | | |

==== November 1931 ====
1931
| Party | Candidate | Votes | % | ±% |
|---|---|---|---|---|
| Conservative | W. Somerville* | uncontested | | |
| Conservative hold | | Swing | | |

==== November 1932 ====
1932
| Party | Candidate | Votes | % | ±% |
|---|---|---|---|---|
| Liberal | J. W. Maitland* | 4,544 | 80.8 | N/A |
| Labour | W. Taylor | 1,080 | 19.2 | N/A |
| Majority | | 3,464 | 61.6 | N/A |
| Turnout | | 5,624 | | |
| Liberal hold | | Swing | | |

==== November 1933 ====
1933
| Party | Candidate | Votes | % | ±% |
|---|---|---|---|---|
| Conservative | J. Watts | 5,400 | 55.0 | N/A |
| Liberal | S. D. Simon* | 3,273 | 33.4 | −47.4 |
| Labour | G. Reid | 1,141 | 11.6 | −7.6 |
| Majority | | 2,127 | 21.6 | |
| Turnout | | 9,814 | | |
| Conservative gain from Liberal | | Swing | | |

==== November 1934 ====
1934
| Party | Candidate | Votes | % | ±% |
|---|---|---|---|---|
| Conservative | W. Somerville* | 4,580 | 73.4 | +18.4 |
| Labour | C. Bamber | 1,664 | 26.6 | +15.0 |
| Majority | | 2,916 | 46.8 | +25.2 |
| Turnout | | 6,244 | | |
| Conservative hold | | Swing | | |

==== November 1935 ====
1935
| Party | Candidate | Votes | % | ±% |
|---|---|---|---|---|
| Conservative | N. Beith | 4,533 | 49.2 | −24.2 |
| Liberal | J. W. Maitland* | 3,003 | 32.6 | N/A |
| Labour | J. Cooper | 1,686 | 18.2 | −8.4 |
| Majority | | 1,530 | 16.6 | −30.2 |
| Turnout | | 9,222 | | |
| Conservative gain from Liberal | | Swing | | |

==== November 1936 ====
1936
| Party | Candidate | Votes | % | ±% |
|---|---|---|---|---|
| Conservative | J. Watts* | 6,062 | 79.3 | +30.1 |
| Labour | A. Plummer | 1,580 | 20.7 | +2.5 |
| Majority | | 4,482 | 58.6 | +42.0 |
| Turnout | | 7,642 | | |
| Conservative hold | | Swing | | |

==== November 1937 ====
1937
| Party | Candidate | Votes | % | ±% |
|---|---|---|---|---|
| Conservative | W. Somerville* | 5,776 | 73.8 | −5.5 |
| Labour | F. Beverley | 2,052 | 26.2 | +5.5 |
| Majority | | 3,724 | 47.6 | −11.0 |
| Turnout | | 7,828 | | |
| Conservative hold | | Swing | | |

==== November 1938 ====
1938
| Party | Candidate | Votes | % | ±% |
|---|---|---|---|---|
| Conservative | H. Strange | 5,632 | 74.9 | +1.1 |
| Labour | C. W. Jones | 1,889 | 25.1 | −1.1 |
| Majority | | 3,743 | 49.8 | +2.2 |
| Turnout | | 7,521 | | |
| Conservative hold | | Swing | | |

=== Elections in 1940s ===
==== November 1945 ====
1945 (2 vacancies)
| Party | Candidate | Votes | % | ±% |
|---|---|---|---|---|
| Conservative | M. S. Whittaker* | 6,981 | 66.9 | −8.0 |
| Conservative | R. Turley* | 6,979 | 66.9 | −8.0 |
| Labour | F. Kelsall | 3,453 | 33.1 | +8.0 |
| Labour | W. H. Brightman | 3,280 | 31.4 | +8.0 |
| Majority | | 3,526 | 33.8 | −16.0 |
| Turnout | | 10,434 | 31.6 | |
| Conservative hold | | Swing | | |
| Conservative hold | | Swing | | |

==== November 1946 ====
1946
| Party | Candidate | Votes | % | ±% |
|---|---|---|---|---|
| Conservative | W. Somerville* | 8,225 | 57.5 | −9.4 |
| Labour | A. Harvey | 3,984 | 27.9 | −5.2 |
| Liberal | J. T. Chapman | 2,093 | 14.6 | N/A |
| Majority | | 4,241 | 29.7 | −4.1 |
| Turnout | | 14,302 | | |
| Conservative hold | | Swing | | |

==== November 1947 ====
1947
| Party | Candidate | Votes | % | ±% |
|---|---|---|---|---|
| Conservative | R. Turley* | 12,999 | 65.8 | +8.3 |
| Labour | D. Molloy | 4,633 | 23.5 | −4.4 |
| Liberal | J. T. Chapman | 2,114 | 10.7 | −3.9 |
| Majority | | 8,366 | 42.3 | +12.6 |
| Turnout | | 19,746 | | |
| Conservative hold | | Swing | | |

==== March 1949 (by-election) ====
By-election: 10 March 1949
| Party | Candidate | Votes | % | ±% |
|---|---|---|---|---|
| Conservative | G. W. G. Fitzsimons | 7,036 | 66.1 | +0.3 |
| Labour | W. M. Parkinson | 2,584 | 24.3 | +0.8 |
| Independent Liberal | J. T. Chapman | 1,031 | 9.6 | N/A |
| Majority | | 4,452 | 41.8 | −0.5 |
| Turnout | | 10,651 | | |
| Conservative hold | | Swing | | |

==== May 1949 ====
1949
| Party | Candidate | Votes | % | ±% |
|---|---|---|---|---|
| Conservative | M. S. Whittaker* | 10,552 | 75.0 | +9.2 |
| Labour | W. M. Parkinson | 3,522 | 25.0 | +1.5 |
| Majority | | 7,030 | 50.0 | +7.7 |
| Turnout | | 14,074 | | |
| Conservative hold | | Swing | | |

==== November 1949 (by-election) ====
By-election: 24 November 1949
| Party | Candidate | Votes | % | ±% |
|---|---|---|---|---|
| Conservative | A. Wood | 8,606 | 68.8 | −6.2 |
| Labour | W. M. Parkinson | 2,516 | 20.1 | −4.9 |
| Liberal | J. T. Chapman | 1,386 | 11.1 | N/A |
| Majority | | 6,090 | 48.7 | −1.3 |
| Turnout | | 12,508 | | |
| Conservative hold | | Swing | | |

=== Elections in 1950s ===
==== May 1950 ====
1950 (new boundaries)
| Party | Candidate | Votes | % | ±% |
|---|---|---|---|---|
| Conservative | G. W. G. Fitzsimons* | 5,059 | 78.9 | |
| Labour | L. L. Hanbridge | 1,350 | 21.1 | |
| Majority | | 3,709 | 57.8 | |
| Turnout | | 6,409 | | |
| Conservative hold | | Swing | | |

==== May 1951 ====
1951
| Party | Candidate | Votes | % | ±% |
|---|---|---|---|---|
| Conservative | A. Wood* | 4,965 | 83.0 | +4.1 |
| Labour | C. E. Bedgood | 1,016 | 17.0 | −4.1 |
| Majority | | 3,949 | 66.0 | +8.2 |
| Turnout | | 5,981 | | |
| Conservative hold | | Swing | | |

==== May 1952 ====
1952
| Party | Candidate | Votes | % | ±% |
|---|---|---|---|---|
| Conservative | M. S. Whittaker* | 4,600 | 73.7 | −9.3 |
| Labour | C. E. Bedgood | 1,642 | 26.3 | +9.3 |
| Majority | | 2,958 | 47.4 | −18.6 |
| Turnout | | 6,242 | | |
| Conservative hold | | Swing | | |

==== May 1953 ====
1953
| Party | Candidate | Votes | % | ±% |
|---|---|---|---|---|
| Conservative | G. W. G. Fitzsimons* | 4,471 | 79.3 | +5.6 |
| Labour | C. E. Bedgood | 1,166 | 20.7 | −5.6 |
| Majority | | 3,305 | 58.6 | +11.2 |
| Turnout | | 5,637 | | |
| Conservative hold | | Swing | | |

==== May 1954 ====
1954
| Party | Candidate | Votes | % | ±% |
|---|---|---|---|---|
| Conservative | S. Ralphs | 3,675 | 77.3 | −2.0 |
| Labour | M. E. Morley | 1,079 | 22.7 | +2.0 |
| Majority | | 2,596 | 54.6 | −4.0 |
| Turnout | | 4,754 | | |
| Conservative hold | | Swing | | |

==== May 1955 ====
1955
| Party | Candidate | Votes | % | ±% |
|---|---|---|---|---|
| Conservative | M. Whittaker* | 4,287 | 81.6 | +4.3 |
| Labour | N. Selwyn | 964 | 18.4 | −4.3 |
| Majority | | 3,323 | 63.2 | +8.6 |
| Turnout | | 5,251 | | |
| Conservative hold | | Swing | | |

==== May 1956 ====
1956
| Party | Candidate | Votes | % | ±% |
|---|---|---|---|---|
| Conservative | G. W. G. Fitzsimons* | 3,366 | 83.1 | +1.5 |
| Labour | R. E. Talbot | 683 | 16.9 | −1.5 |
| Majority | | 2,683 | 66.2 | +3.0 |
| Turnout | | 4,049 | | |
| Conservative hold | | Swing | | |

==== May 1957 ====
1957
| Party | Candidate | Votes | % | ±% |
|---|---|---|---|---|
| Conservative | S. Ralphs* | 3,168 | 73.0 | −10.1 |
| Labour | R. P. Greenwood | 1,169 | 27.0 | +10.1 |
| Majority | | 1,999 | 46.0 | −20.2 |
| Turnout | | 4,337 | | |
| Conservative hold | | Swing | | |

==== May 1958 ====
1958
| Party | Candidate | Votes | % | ±% |
|---|---|---|---|---|
| Conservative | M. Whittaker* | 3,283 | 72.0 | −1.0 |
| Labour | R. P. Greenwood | 1,278 | 28.0 | +1.0 |
| Majority | | 2,005 | 44.0 | −2.0 |
| Turnout | | 4,561 | | |
| Conservative hold | | Swing | | |

==== May 1959 ====
1959
| Party | Candidate | Votes | % | ±% |
|---|---|---|---|---|
| Conservative | G. W. G. Fitzsimons* | 3,942 | 77.2 | +5.2 |
| Labour | R. Grills | 1,167 | 22.8 | −5.2 |
| Majority | | 2,775 | 54.4 | +10.4 |
| Turnout | | 5,109 | | |
| Conservative hold | | Swing | | |

=== Elections in 1960s ===
==== May 1960 ====
1960
| Party | Candidate | Votes | % | ±% |
|---|---|---|---|---|
| Conservative | S. Ralphs* | 2,607 | 55.2 | −22.0 |
| Ratepayers | T. A. Harper | 1,623 | 34.4 | N/A |
| Labour | P. Potts | 490 | 10.4 | −12.4 |
| Majority | | 984 | 20.8 | −33.6 |
| Turnout | | 4,720 | | |
| Conservative hold | | Swing | | |

==== May 1961 ====
1961
| Party | Candidate | Votes | % | ±% |
|---|---|---|---|---|
| Conservative | M. Whittaker* | 2,626 | 48.1 | −7.1 |
| Liberal | M. Cheers | 1,267 | 23.2 | N/A |
| Ratepayers | T. A. Harper | 893 | 16.3 | −18.1 |
| Labour | H. P. D. Paget | 677 | 12.4 | +2.0 |
| Majority | | 1,359 | 24.9 | +4.1 |
| Turnout | | 5,463 | | |
| Conservative hold | | Swing | | |

==== May 1962 ====
1962
| Party | Candidate | Votes | % | ±% |
|---|---|---|---|---|
| Conservative | G. W. G. Fitzsimons* | 2,655 | 44.6 | −3.5 |
| Liberal | M. Cheers | 2,108 | 35.4 | +12.2 |
| Labour | H. P. D. Paget | 762 | 12.8 | +0.4 |
| Ratepayers | T. A. Harper | 400 | 6.7 | −9.6 |
| Union Movement | L. J. Hyland | 29 | 0.5 | N/A |
| Majority | | 547 | 9.2 | −15.7 |
| Turnout | | 5,954 | | |
| Conservative hold | | Swing | | |

==== May 1963 ====
1963
| Party | Candidate | Votes | % | ±% |
|---|---|---|---|---|
| Conservative | S. Ralphs* | 2,422 | 38.4 | −6.2 |
| Liberal | M. Cheers | 1,966 | 31.2 | −4.2 |
| Labour | H. P. D. Paget | 1,263 | 20.1 | +7.3 |
| Ratepayers | T. Johnson | 648 | 10.3 | +3.6 |
| Majority | | 456 | 7.2 | −2.0 |
| Turnout | | 6,299 | | |
| Conservative hold | | Swing | | |

==== May 1964 ====
1964
| Party | Candidate | Votes | % | ±% |
|---|---|---|---|---|
| Conservative | L. Sanders | 2,786 | 51.1 | +12.7 |
| Liberal | J. Hartley | 1,414 | 25.9 | −5.3 |
| Labour | J. Moore | 1,254 | 23.0 | +2.9 |
| Majority | | 1,372 | 25.2 | +18.0 |
| Turnout | | 5,454 | | |
| Conservative hold | | Swing | | |

==== May 1965 ====
1965
| Party | Candidate | Votes | % | ±% |
|---|---|---|---|---|
| Conservative | G. W. G. Fitzsimons* | 3,526 | 60.6 | +9.5 |
| Liberal | J. Hartley | 1,148 | 19.8 | −6.1 |
| Labour | R. F. Delahunty | 1,141 | 19.6 | −3.4 |
| Majority | | 2,378 | 40.9 | +15.7 |
| Turnout | | 5,815 | | |
| Conservative hold | | Swing | | |

==== June 1965 (by-election) ====
By-election: 24 June 1965
| Party | Candidate | Votes | % | ±% |
|---|---|---|---|---|
| Conservative | M. A. Vince | 2,371 | 54.4 | −6.2 |
| Liberal | J. Hartley | 1,242 | 28.5 | +8.7 |
| Labour | R. F. Delahunty | 747 | 17.1 | −2.5 |
| Majority | | 1,129 | 25.9 | −15.0 |
| Turnout | | 4,360 | | |
| Conservative hold | | Swing | | |

==== May 1966 ====
1966
| Party | Candidate | Votes | % | ±% |
|---|---|---|---|---|
| Conservative | M. A. Vince* | 2,632 | 63.0 | +2.4 |
| Labour | H. Barrett | 864 | 20.7 | +1.1 |
| Liberal | F. E. Hartley | 685 | 16.3 | −3.2 |
| Majority | | 1,768 | 42.3 | +1.4 |
| Turnout | | 4,181 | | |
| Conservative hold | | Swing | | |

==== March 1967 (by-election) ====
By-election: 9 March 1967
| Party | Candidate | Votes | % | ±% |
|---|---|---|---|---|
| Conservative | A. D. Ashley | 3,111 | 66.1 | +3.1 |
| Liberal | F. E. Hartley | 802 | 17.0 | +0.7 |
| Labour | S. V. Shaw | 794 | 16.9 | −3.8 |
| Majority | | 2,309 | 49.1 | +6.8 |
| Turnout | | 4,707 | | |
| Conservative hold | | Swing | | |

==== May 1967 ====
1967
| Party | Candidate | Votes | % | ±% |
|---|---|---|---|---|
| Conservative | L. Sanders* | 3,248 | 71.4 | +8.4 |
| Labour | S. V. Shaw | 750 | 16.5 | −4.2 |
| Liberal | F. E. Hartley | 548 | 12.1 | −4.2 |
| Majority | | 2,498 | 54.9 | +12.6 |
| Turnout | | 4,546 | | |
| Conservative hold | | Swing | | |

==== May 1968 ====
1968
| Party | Candidate | Votes | % | ±% |
|---|---|---|---|---|
| Conservative | A. D. Ashley* | 3,843 | 86.3 | +14.9 |
| Labour | A. Holland | 609 | 13.7 | −2.8 |
| Majority | | 3,234 | 72.6 | +17.7 |
| Turnout | | 4,452 | | |
| Conservative hold | | Swing | | |

==== May 1969 ====
1969
| Party | Candidate | Votes | % | ±% |
|---|---|---|---|---|
| Conservative | M. A. Vince* | 3,395 | 83.0 | −3.3 |
| Labour | S. C. Silverman | 696 | 17.0 | +3.3 |
| Majority | | 2,699 | 66.0 | −6.6 |
| Turnout | | 4,091 | | |
| Conservative hold | | Swing | | |

=== Elections in 1970s ===
==== May 1970 ====
1970
| Party | Candidate | Votes | % | ±% |
|---|---|---|---|---|
| Conservative | L. Sanders* | 3,497 | 75.5 | −7.5 |
| Labour | B. S. Jeuda | 1,057 | 22.8 | +5.8 |
| Residents | S. Nwagbara | 76 | 1.7 | N/A |
| Majority | | 2,440 | 52.7 | −13.3 |
| Turnout | | 4,630 | | |
| Conservative hold | | Swing | | |

==== May 1971 ====
1971 (3 vacancies; new boundaries)
| Party | Candidate | Votes | % | ±% |
|---|---|---|---|---|
| Conservative | L. Sanders* | 2,747 | 58.9 | |
| Conservative | M. A. Vince* | 2,714 | 58.2 | |
| Conservative | M. Delavan | 2,561 | 54.9 | |
| Labour | R. J. Williamson | 1,933 | 41.5 | |
| Labour | G. H. Yeadon | 1,906 | 40.9 | |
| Labour | J. J. Fanning | 1,900 | 40.7 | |
| Communist | D. J. Heywood | 227 | 4.9 | |
| Majority | | 628 | 13.5 | |
| Turnout | | 4,663 | | |
| Conservative win (new seat) | | | | |
| Conservative win (new seat) | | | | |
| Conservative win (new seat) | | | | |

==== May 1972 ====
1972
| Party | Candidate | Votes | % | ±% |
|---|---|---|---|---|
| Conservative | M. Delavan* | 2,970 | 69.0 | +11.1 |
| Labour | H. M. Gregory | 1,336 | 31.0 | −10.5 |
| Majority | | 1,634 | 38.0 | +24.5 |
| Turnout | | 4,306 | | |
| Conservative hold | | Swing | | |

==== May 1973 ====
1973 (3 vacancies; reorganisation)
| Party | Candidate | Votes | % | ±% |
|---|---|---|---|---|
| Conservative | L. Sanders* | 2,109 | 53.7 | −15.3 |
| Conservative | M. A. Vince* | 2,078 | 52.9 | −16.1 |
| Conservative | A. D. Ashley | 1,842 | 46.9 | −22.1 |
| Liberal | C. H. Hughes | 979 | 24.9 | N/A |
| Liberal | M. Calder | 977 | 24.9 | N/A |
| Liberal | W. S. Kenyon | 974 | 24.8 | N/A |
| Labour | V. Stevens | 878 | 22.4 | −8.6 |
| Labour | G. Collins | 704 | 17.9 | −13.1 |
| Labour | K. Hull | 660 | 16.8 | −14.2 |
| Majority | | 863 | 22.0 | −16.0 |
| Turnout | | 3,926 | | |
| Conservative hold | | Swing | | |
| Conservative hold | | Swing | | |
| Conservative hold | | Swing | | |

==== May 1975 ====
1975
| Party | Candidate | Votes | % | ±% |
|---|---|---|---|---|
| Conservative | C. Franks | 2,655 | 62.1 | +8.9 |
| Labour | A. Smith | 865 | 20.2 | −1.9 |
| Liberal | W. S. Kenyon | 657 | 15.4 | −9.3 |
| National Front | T. A. Golds | 97 | 2.3 | +2.3 |
| Majority | | 1,790 | 41.9 | +13.3 |
| Turnout | | 4,274 | | |
| Conservative hold | | Swing | +5.4 | |

==== May 1976 ====
1976
| Party | Candidate | Votes | % | ±% |
|---|---|---|---|---|
| Conservative | M. Vince* | 3,030 | 64.9 | +2.8 |
| Labour | A. J. Bateman | 1,164 | 24.9 | +4.7 |
| Liberal | H. Wallace | 478 | 10.2 | −5.2 |
| Majority | | 1,866 | 39.9 | −2.0 |
| Turnout | | 4,672 | | |
| Conservative hold | | Swing | -0.9 | |

==== May 1978 ====
1978
| Party | Candidate | Votes | % | ±% |
|---|---|---|---|---|
| Conservative | L. Sanders* | 2,769 | 62.0 | −2.9 |
| Labour | K. Cropper | 1,387 | 31.1 | +6.2 |
| Liberal | J. Commons | 308 | 6.9 | −3.3 |
| Majority | | 1,382 | 31.0 | −8.9 |
| Turnout | | 4,464 | 38.4 | |
| Conservative hold | | Swing | -4.5 | |

==== May 1979 ====
1979
| Party | Candidate | Votes | % | ±% |
|---|---|---|---|---|
| Conservative | C. Franks* | 4,244 | 51.0 | −11.0 |
| Labour | H. Brown | 2,979 | 35.8 | +4.7 |
| Liberal | J. Commons | 1,096 | 13.2 | +6.3 |
| Majority | | 1,265 | 15.2 | −15.8 |
| Turnout | | 8,319 | 75.9 | +37.5 |
| Conservative hold | | Swing | -7.8 | |

=== Elections in 1980s ===
==== May 1980 ====
1980
| Party | Candidate | Votes | % | ±% |
|---|---|---|---|---|
| Conservative | M. Vince* | 2,267 | 47.1 | −3.9 |
| Labour | H. Brown | 2,067 | 43.0 | +7.2 |
| Liberal | J. Commons | 421 | 8.8 | −4.4 |
| Communist | B. E. Struszckak | 54 | 1.1 | +1.1 |
| Majority | | 200 | 4.2 | −11.0 |
| Turnout | | 4,809 | 43.7 | −32.2 |
| Conservative hold | | Swing | +5.5 | |

==== May 1982 ====
1982 (3 vacancies; new boundaries)
| Party | Candidate | Votes | % | ±% |
|---|---|---|---|---|
| Conservative | Leslie Sanders* | 2,326 | 41.9 | |
| Conservative | Maureen Vince* | 2,260 | 40.7 | |
| Conservative | Cecil Franks* | 2,249 | 40.5 | |
| Labour | Michael Ash-Edwards | 1,595 | 28.7 | |
| Labour | Beverley Watson | 1,538 | 27.7 | |
| Labour | Stephen Darroch | 1,478 | 26.6 | |
| Liberal | John Commons | 1,390 | 25.0 | |
| SDP | Mary James | 1,301 | 23.4 | |
| SDP | Michael Palmer | 1,235 | 22.2 | |
| Majority | | 654 | 11.8 | |
| Turnout | | 5,555 | 50.4 | |
| Conservative win (new seat) | | | | |
| Conservative win (new seat) | | | | |
| Conservative win (new seat) | | | | |

==== May 1983 ====
1983
| Party | Candidate | Votes | % | ±% |
|---|---|---|---|---|
| Conservative | Cecil Franks* | 2,547 | 46.8 | +3.0 |
| Labour | Graham Martin | 1,986 | 36.5 | +6.4 |
| Liberal | John Commons | 876 | 16.1 | −10.1 |
| Communist | Michael Waterfield | 36 | 0.7 | +0.7 |
| Majority | | 561 | 10.3 | −3.4 |
| Turnout | | 5,445 | | |
| Conservative hold | | Swing | -1.7 | |

==== May 1984 ====
1984
| Party | Candidate | Votes | % | ±% |
|---|---|---|---|---|
| Conservative | E. Walker | 2,167 | 42.3 | −4.5 |
| Conservative | Margaret Davies | 2,149 | | |
| Labour | W. Courtney | 2,104 | 41.1 | +4.6 |
| Labour | Richard Reddington | 1,906 | | |
| Liberal | John Commons | 752 | 14.7 | −1.4 |
| Liberal | Margaret Boyle | 708 | | |
| Communist | Michael Waterfield | 93 | 1.8 | +1.1 |
| Majority | | 45 | 1.2 | −9.8 |
| Turnout | | 9,879 | | |
| Conservative hold | | Swing | | |
| Conservative hold | | Swing | -4.5 | |

==== May 1986 ====
1986
| Party | Candidate | Votes | % | ±% |
|---|---|---|---|---|
| Labour | D. Black | 2,848 | 48.2 | +7.1 |
| Conservative | J. Kershaw | 2,244 | 38.0 | −4.3 |
| Liberal | W. Paver | 776 | 13.1 | −1.6 |
| Communist | M. Waterfield | 35 | 0.6 | −1.2 |
| Majority | | 604 | 10.2 | |
| Turnout | | 5,903 | | |
| Labour gain from Conservative | | Swing | +5.7 | |

==== May 1987 ====
1987
| Party | Candidate | Votes | % | ±% |
|---|---|---|---|---|
| Conservative | Daniel Kielthy | 2,887 | 44.4 | +6.4 |
| Labour | Philip Openshaw | 2,132 | 32.8 | −15.4 |
| Liberal | Margaret Boyle | 1,287 | 19.8 | +6.7 |
| Green | Marian Daltrop | 200 | 3.1 | +3.1 |
| Majority | | 755 | 11.6 | +1.4 |
| Turnout | | 6,506 | | |
| Conservative hold | | Swing | +10.9 | |

==== May 1988 ====
1988
| Party | Candidate | Votes | % | ±% |
|---|---|---|---|---|
| Labour | A. Tomlinson | 2,693 | 43.5 | +10.7 |
| Conservative | E. Walker* | 2,655 | 42.9 | −1.5 |
| SLD | R. T. Bogg | 467 | 7.6 | −12.2 |
| Green | D. Glazier | 231 | 3.7 | +0.6 |
| Communist | M. Waterfield | 139 | 2.2 | +2.2 |
| Majority | | 38 | 0.6 | −11.0 |
| Turnout | | 6,185 | | |
| Labour gain from Conservative | | Swing | +6.1 | |

=== Elections in 1990s ===
==== May 1990 ====
1990
| Party | Candidate | Votes | % | ±% |
|---|---|---|---|---|
| Labour | D. Black* | 2,897 | 52.2 | +8.7 |
| Conservative | W. I. Bradshaw | 1,728 | 31.1 | −11.8 |
| Green | B. Candeland | 588 | 10.6 | +6.9 |
| Liberal Democrats | H. D. McKay | 339 | 6.1 | −1.5 |
| Majority | | 1,169 | 21.1 | +20.5 |
| Turnout | | 5,552 | | |
| Labour hold | | Swing | +10.2 | |

==== May 1991 ====
1991 (2 vacancies)
| Party | Candidate | Votes | % | ±% |
|---|---|---|---|---|
| Labour | C. M. Rogers | 2,187 | 39.8 | −12.4 |
| Labour | B. D. Selby | 1,979 | | |
| Conservative | J. Bradshaw | 1,829 | 33.3 | +2.2 |
| Conservative | W. I. Bradshaw | 1,816 | | |
| Green | B. A. Candeland | 751 | 13.7 | +3.1 |
| Liberal Democrats | H. D. McKay | 723 | 13.2 | +7.1 |
| Liberal Democrats | J. Redmond | 512 | | |
| Majority | | 150 | 6.5 | −14.6 |
| Turnout | | 5,490 | 48.3 | |
| Labour gain from Conservative | | Swing | | |
| Labour hold | | Swing | -7.3 | |

==== May 1992 ====
1992
| Party | Candidate | Votes | % | ±% |
|---|---|---|---|---|
| Labour | M. Langford | 2,214 | 50.7 | +10.9 |
| Conservative | I. Bradshaw | 1,548 | 35.5 | +2.2 |
| Liberal Democrats | S. Oliver | 310 | 7.1 | −6.1 |
| Green | B. Candeland | 294 | 6.7 | −7.0 |
| Majority | | 666 | 15.3 | +8.8 |
| Turnout | | 4,366 | | |
| Labour hold | | Swing | +4.3 | |

==== April 1993 (by-election) ====
By-election: 29 April 1993
| Party | Candidate | Votes | % | ±% |
|---|---|---|---|---|
| Labour | G. Betney | 2,092 | 48.5 | −2.2 |
| Liberal Democrats | B. Pierce | 1,061 | 24.6 | +17.5 |
| Conservative | F. Roche | 969 | 22.5 | −13.0 |
| Green | M. Steel | 147 | 3.4 | −3.3 |
| Independent Labour | M. Scantlebury | 40 | 0.9 | N/A |
| Majority | | 1,031 | 23.9 | +8.6 |
| Turnout | | 4,309 | | |
| Labour hold | | Swing | | |

==== May 1994 ====
1994
| Party | Candidate | Votes | % | ±% |
|---|---|---|---|---|
| Labour | B. Selby* | 2,722 | 58.9 | +8.2 |
| Conservative | J. Smith | 917 | 19.9 | −15.6 |
| Liberal Democrats | B. Pierce | 643 | 13.9 | +6.8 |
| Green | B. Candeland | 337 | 7.3 | +0.6 |
| Majority | | 1,805 | 39.1 | +23.8 |
| Turnout | | 4,619 | | |
| Labour hold | | Swing | +11.9 | |

==== May 1995 ====
1995
| Party | Candidate | Votes | % | ±% |
|---|---|---|---|---|
| Labour | Valerie Stevens | 2,903 | 67.9 | +9.0 |
| Conservative | Jonathan Smith | 651 | 15.2 | −4.7 |
| Liberal Democrats | Helen Fisher | 440 | 10.3 | −3.6 |
| Green | Brian Candeland | 279 | 6.5 | −0.8 |
| Majority | | 2,252 | 52.7 | +13.6 |
| Turnout | | 4,273 | | |
| Labour hold | | Swing | +6.8 | |

==== May 1996 ====
1996
| Party | Candidate | Votes | % | ±% |
|---|---|---|---|---|
| Labour | Mary Humphreys | 2,796 | 68.1 | +0.2 |
| Conservative | Malcolm Cleall-Hill | 734 | 17.9 | +2.7 |
| Liberal Democrats | Helen Fisher | 309 | 7.5 | −2.8 |
| Green | Brian Candeland | 269 | 6.5 | +0.0 |
| Majority | | 2,062 | 50.2 | −2.5 |
| Turnout | | 4,108 | | |
| Labour hold | | Swing | -1.2 | |

==== May 1998 ====
1998
| Party | Candidate | Votes | % | ±% |
|---|---|---|---|---|
| Labour Co-op | Bernard Selby* | 1,298 | 43.5 | −24.6 |
| Conservative | Malcolm Cleall-Hill | 624 | 20.9 | +3.0 |
| Green | Julian Parry | 404 | 13.5 | +7.0 |
| Liberal Democrats | Cath Hall | 393 | 13.2 | +5.7 |
| Socialist Labour | Evan Pritchard | 267 | 8.9 | +8.9 |
| Majority | | 674 | 22.6 | −27.6 |
| Turnout | | 2,986 | | |
| Labour hold | | Swing | -13.8 | |

==== May 1999 ====
1999 (2 vacancies)
| Party | Candidate | Votes | % | ±% |
|---|---|---|---|---|
| Labour | Sheila Newman | 1,723 | 48.6 | +5.1 |
| Labour | Valerie Stevens* | 1,666 | | |
| Conservative | Malcolm Cleall-Hill | 703 | 19.8 | −1.1 |
| Conservative | Ian Paley | 691 | | |
| Green | Julian Parry | 675 | 19.0 | +5.5 |
| Liberal Democrats | Catherine Hall | 446 | 12.6 | −0.6 |
| Liberal Democrats | Derek Mellor | 355 | | |
| Majority | | 963 | 28.8 | +6.2 |
| Turnout | | 3,547 | 28.4 | |
| Labour hold | | Swing | | |
| Labour hold | | Swing | +3.1 | |

=== Elections in 2000s ===
==== May 2002 ====
2000
| Party | Candidate | Votes | % | ±% |
|---|---|---|---|---|
| Labour Co-op | Valerie Stevens* | 1,505 | 47.5 | −1.1 |
| Conservative | Ian Paley | 656 | 20.7 | +0.9 |
| Green | Anne Power | 536 | 16.9 | −2.1 |
| Liberal Democrats | Antony Bethell | 474 | 14.9 | +2.3 |
| Majority | | 849 | 26.8 | −2.0 |
| Turnout | | 3,171 | 27.0 | −1.4 |
| Labour Co-op hold | | Swing | -1.0 | |

==== May 2002 ====
2002
| Party | Candidate | Votes | % | ±% |
|---|---|---|---|---|
| Labour | Bernard Selby* | 1,716 | 44.7 | −2.8 |
| Liberal Democrats | Antony Bethell | 728 | 19.0 | +4.1 |
| Conservative | Daniel Valentine | 593 | 15.5 | −5.2 |
| Green | Michelle Valentine | 503 | 13.1 | −3.8 |
| Socialist Alliance | Heather Rose | 298 | 7.8 | +7.8 |
| Majority | | 988 | 25.7 | −1.1 |
| Turnout | | 3,838 | 32.0 | +5.0 |
| Labour hold | | Swing | -3.4 | |

==== May 2003 ====
2003
| Party | Candidate | Votes | % | ±% |
|---|---|---|---|---|
| Labour | Sheila Newman* | 1,288 | 39.3 | −5.4 |
| Liberal Democrats | Howard Totty | 770 | 23.5 | +4.5 |
| Conservative | Giles Campbell | 487 | 14.9 | −0.6 |
| Green | Michael Daw | 470 | 14.3 | +1.2 |
| Socialist Alliance | Heather Rose | 263 | 8.0 | +0.2 |
| Majority | | 518 | 15.8 | −9.9 |
| Turnout | | 3,278 | 28.0 | −4.0 |
| Labour hold | | Swing | -4.9 | |

==== June 2004 ====
2004 (3 vacancies; new boundaries)
| Party | Candidate | Votes | % | ±% |
|---|---|---|---|---|
| Labour | Sheila Newman* | 1,635 | 32.9 | N/A |
| Liberal Democrats | Angela Gallagher | 1,620 | 32.6 | N/A |
| Labour | Val Stevens* | 1,602 | | |
| Liberal Democrats | Charles Glover | 1,448 | | |
| Labour | John Hacking | 1,413 | | |
| Liberal Democrats | Rajah Bhatti | 1,385 | | |
| Green | Juliet Lawson | 765 | 15.4 | N/A |
| Green | Michael Daw | 752 | | |
| Green | Jessica Symons | 726 | | |
| Conservative | Malcolm Cleall-Hill | 429 | 8.6 | N/A |
| Conservative | Nicholas Antoniou | 401 | | |
| Respect | Ameen Hadi | 351 | 7.1 | N/A |
| Conservative | Amar Ahmed | 334 | | |
| Socialist Alliance | Daniel Murphy | 162 | 3.2 | N/A |
| Majority | | 154 | 0.3 | N/A |
| Turnout | | 4,962 | 46.9 | N/A |
| Labour win (new seat) | | | | |
| Liberal Democrats win (new seat) | | | | |
| Labour win (new seat) | | | | |

==== May 2006 ====
2006
| Party | Candidate | Votes | % | ±% |
|---|---|---|---|---|
| Labour Co-op | Val Stevens* | 1,828 | 42.0 | +9.0 |
| Liberal Democrats | Charles Leslie Glover | 1,713 | 39.4 | +6.7 |
| Green | Brian Arthur Candeland | 609 | 14.0 | −1.4 |
| Conservative | Amar Rouf Ahmed | 198 | 4.6 | −4.0 |
| Majority | | 115 | 2.6 | +2.3 |
| Turnout | | 4,348 | 43.0 | −3.9 |
| Labour hold | | Swing | +1.1 | |

==== May 2007 ====
2007
| Party | Candidate | Votes | % | ±% |
|---|---|---|---|---|
| Liberal Democrats | Paul Ankers | 1,823 | 41.3 | +1.9 |
| Labour | Angela Gallagher* | 1,781 | 40.4 | −1.6 |
| Green | Brian Candeland | 544 | 12.3 | −1.7 |
| Conservative | Claire McLauchlin | 264 | 6.0 | +1.4 |
| Majority | | 42 | 1.0 | −1.6 |
| Turnout | | 4,412 | 43.3 | +0.3 |
| Liberal Democrats gain from Labour | | Swing | +1.7 | |

==== May 2008 ====
2008
| Party | Candidate | Votes | % | ±% |
|---|---|---|---|---|
| Labour | Sheila Newman* | 2,126 | 45.2 | +4.8 |
| Liberal Democrats | Lianne Williams | 1,867 | 39.7 | −1.6 |
| Green | Brian Candeland | 448 | 9.5 | −2.8 |
| Conservative | David Hopps | 260 | 5.5 | −0.5 |
| Majority | | 259 | 5.5 | +4.5 |
| Turnout | | 4,701 | 46.0 | +2.7 |
| Labour hold | | Swing | +3.2 | |

=== Elections in 2010s ===
==== May 2010 ====
2010
| Party | Candidate | Votes | % | ±% |
|---|---|---|---|---|
| Liberal Democrats | Victor Max Mark Chamberlain | 3,349 | 43.6 | +3.9 |
| Labour | Amina Lone | 2,981 | 38.8 | −6.4 |
| Green | Brian Arthur Candeland | 825 | 10.7 | +1.2 |
| Conservative | Saira Hanif | 522 | 6.8 | +1.3 |
| Majority | | 368 | 4.8 | −0.7 |
| Turnout | | 7,677 | 72.5 | +26.5 |
| Liberal Democrats gain from Labour | | Swing | +5.1 | |

==== May 2011 ====
2011
| Party | Candidate | Votes | % | ±% |
|---|---|---|---|---|
| Labour | Matthew Strong | 2,964 | 53.6 | +13.2 |
| Liberal Democrats | Paul Ankers* | 1,701 | 30.7 | −10.6 |
| Green | Brian Candeland | 647 | 11.7 | −0.6 |
| Conservative | Mohammed Afzal | 223 | 4.0 | −2.0 |
| Majority | | 1,263 | 22.8 | |
| Turnout | | 5,535 | 50.7 | |
| Labour gain from Liberal Democrats | | Swing | | |

==== May 2012 ====
2012
| Party | Candidate | Votes | % | ±% |
|---|---|---|---|---|
| Labour | Sheila Newman* | 2,433 | 56.8 | +11.6 |
| Liberal Democrats | Matt Gallagher | 797 | 18.6 | −21.1 |
| Green | Brian Candeland | 503 | 11.8 | +2.3 |
| TUSC | Mark Krantz | 368 | 8.6 | N/A |
| Conservative | Jonathan Beardmore | 180 | 4.2 | −1.3 |
| Majority | | 1,636 | 38 | |
| Turnout | | 4,281 | 39.19 | |
| Labour hold | | Swing | | |

==== May 2014 ====
2014
| Party | Candidate | Votes | % | ±% |
|---|---|---|---|---|
| Labour Co-op | John Hacking | 2,675 | 54.98 | +16.18 |
| Green | Jake Welsh | 1,002 | 20.60 | +9.90 |
| Liberal Democrats | Peter James Maxon | 739 | 15.19 | −28.41 |
| Conservative | Zachery Husseini | 286 | 5.88 | −0.92 |
| TUSC | Mark Bradley Krantz | 163 | 3.35 | N/A |
| Majority | | 1,673 | 34.4 | |
| Turnout | | 4,865 | 44.34 | |
| Labour gain from Liberal Democrats | | Swing | | |

==== May 2015 ====
2015
| Party | Candidate | Votes | % | ±% |
|---|---|---|---|---|
| Labour | Matt Strong* | 3,991 | 48.5 | −5.1 |
| Liberal Democrats | Matt Gallagher | 1,618 | 19.7 | −11.0 |
| Green | Jake Welsh | 1,610 | 19.5 | +7.8 |
| Conservative | Colm George Lock | 600 | 7.3 | +3.3 |
| Independent | Mary Rosalind Crumpton | 233 | 2.8 | N/A |
| TUSC | Liam Curless | 180 | 2.2 | N/A |
| Majority | | 2,373 | 28.8 | |
| Turnout | | 8,232 | 73.8 | +23.1 |
| Labour hold | | Swing | | |

==== May 2016 ====
2016
| Party | Candidate | Votes | % | ±% |
|---|---|---|---|---|
| Labour | Sheila Newman* | 3,296 | 65.68 | |
| Green | Nigel James Woodcock | 778 | 15.50 | |
| Liberal Democrats | Ludo Tolhurst-Cleaver | 719 | 14.33 | |
| Conservative | Colm George Lock | 225 | 4.48 | |
| Majority | | 2,518 | 50.18 | |
| Turnout | | 5,018 | 47.00 | |
| Labour hold | | Swing | | |

==== May 2018 ====
2018 (3 vacancies; new boundaries)
| Party | Candidate | Votes | % | ±% |
|---|---|---|---|---|
| Labour | John Hacking* | 3,175 | 64.1 | |
| Labour | Eve Holt | 3,165 | 63.9 | |
| Labour | Matt Strong* | 2,974 | 60.0 | |
| Green | Nigel Woodcock | 731 | 14.8 | |
| Green | Mary Crumpton | 728 | 14.7 | |
| Green | Anne Power | 653 | 13.2 | |
| Liberal Democrats | Lizzy Bain | 614 | 12.4 | |
| Liberal Democrats | Joanne Milligan | 507 | 10.2 | |
| Women's Equality | Jo Heathcote | 465 | 9.4 | |
| Liberal Democrats | Rhona Brown | 463 | 9.3 | |
| Conservative | Luke Berry | 301 | 6.1 | |
| Conservative | Luke Costello | 242 | 4.9 | |
| Conservative | John Edwards | 221 | 4.5 | |
| Independent | Michael Elston | 145 | 2.9 | |
| Majority | | | | |
| Turnout | | 4,955 | 46.3 | |
| Labour win (new boundaries) | | | | |
| Labour win (new boundaries) | | | | |
| Labour win (new boundaries) | | | | |

==== May 2019 ====
2019
| Party | Candidate | Votes | % | ±% |
|---|---|---|---|---|
| Labour | Matt Strong* | 2,574 | 57.0 | ▼3.0 |
| Green | Mary Crumpton | 950 | 21.0 | ▲6.3 |
| Liberal Democrats | Lizzy Bain | 575 | 12.7 | ▲0.3 |
| Conservative | Keith Berry | 212 | 4.7 | ▼0.4 |
| Women's Equality | Jo Heathcote | 146 | 3.2 | ▼6.2 |
| Independent | Michael Elston | 59 | 1.3 | ▼1.6 |
| Majority | | 1,624 | 35.7 | ▼9.5 |
| Rejected ballots | | 29 | 0.64 | |
| Turnout | | 4,545 | 43.50 | ▼2.8 |
| Registered electors | | 10,452 | | |
| Labour hold | | Swing | ▼4.65 | |

=== Elections in 2020s ===
==== May 2021 ====
2021
| Party | Candidate | Votes | % | ±% |
|---|---|---|---|---|
| Labour Co-op | Eve Holt* | 3,656 | 68.0 | 3.2 ▲ |
| Green | Mary Crumpton | 917 | 17.1 | 2.4 ▲ |
| Conservative | Kath Fitzgibbon | 368 | 6.8 | 1.5 ▲ |
| Liberal Democrats | Robin Grayson | 291 | 5.4 | 5.6 ▼ |
| Women's Equality | Jo Heathcote | 141 | 2.6 | 0.6 ▼ |
| Majority | | 2739 | 50.9 | |
| Rejected ballots | | 40 | 0.7 | |
| Turnout | | 5,413 | 51.03 | 4.7 ▲ |
| Registered electors | | 10,608 | | |
| Labour Co-op hold | | Swing | 0.4 ▲ | |

==== November 2021 (by-election) ====
By-election: 18 November 2021
| Party | Candidate | Votes | % | ±% |
|---|---|---|---|---|
| Labour | Mathew Benham | 1,581 | 52.1 | 4.9▼ |
| Liberal Democrats | Rosie Hughes | 657 | 21.7 | 8.9▲ |
| Green | Simon Milner-Edwards | 608 | 20.0 | 1.0▼ |
| Conservative | Kathleen Fitzgibbon | 93 | 3.1 | 1.6▼ |
| Women's Equality | Jo Heathcote | 66 | 2.2 | 1.1▼ |
| Independent | Paul Harnett | 27 | 0.9 | n/a |
| Majority | | 924 | 30.5 | 5.2▼ |
| Rejected ballots | | 2 | 0.07 | 0.6▼ |
| Turnout | | 3,032 | 28.1 | 22.9▼ |
| Registered electors | | 10,795 | | |
| Labour hold | | Swing | 6.9▼ | |

==== May 2022 ====
2022
| Party | Candidate | Votes | % | ±% |
|---|---|---|---|---|
| Labour | John Hacking* | 2,817 | 65.5 | 1.4 ▲ |
| Green | Anne Power | 726 | 16.9 | 3.7 ▲ |
| Liberal Democrats | Rosie Hughes | 462 | 10.7 | 1.7 ▼ |
| Conservative | Matthew Roden | 167 | 3.9 | 2.2 ▼ |
| Women's Equality | Jo Heathcote | 119 | 2.8 | 6.6 ▼ |
| Majority | | 2,091 | 48.6 | |
| Rejected ballots | | 13 | | |
| Turnout | | 4,291 | 41.2 | 5.1 ▼ |
| Registered electors | | 10,444 | | |
| Labour hold | | Swing | 1.2 ▼ | |

==== May 2023 ====
2023
| Party | Candidate | Votes | % | ±% |
|---|---|---|---|---|
| Labour | Mathew Benham | 2,901 | 67.1 | 10.1 ▲ |
| Green | Anne Power | 850 | 19.6 | −1.4 ▼ |
| Liberal Democrats | Rhona Brown | 308 | 7.1 | −5.6 ▼ |
| Conservative | Keith Berry | 180 | 4.2 | −0.5 ▼ |
| Independent | Michael Elston | 77 | 1.8 | 0.5 ▲ |
| Majority | | 2,051 | 47.5 | 11.8 ▲ |
| Rejected ballots | | 10 | 0.2 | -0.4 ▼ |
| Turnout | | 4,326 | 42.0 | 4.9 ▲ |
| Registered electors | | 10,296 | | |
| Labour hold | | Swing | 5.8 ▲ | |

==== May 2024 ====
2024
| Party | Candidate | Votes | % | ±% |
|---|---|---|---|---|
| Labour | Tina Kirwin-McGinley | 2,809 | 59.5 | 8.5 ▼ |
| Green | Kate Hughes | 1,360 | 28.8 | 11.7 ▲ |
| Liberal Democrats | Rhona Brown | 343 | 7.3 | 1.9 ▲ |
| Conservative | Festus Fofanah | 159 | 3.4 | 3.4 ▼ |
| Majority | | 1,449 | 30.7 | |
| Rejected ballots | | 51 | 1.1 | |
| Turnout | | 4,722 | 44.9 | |
| Registered electors | | 10,524 | | |
| Labour hold | | Swing | 10.1 ▼ | |

==== May 2026 ====
2026
| Party | Candidate | Votes | % | ±% |
|---|---|---|---|---|
| Green | Chantal Kerr-Sheppard | 2,549 | 45.4 | ▲28.5 |
| Labour | John Hacking* | 2,374 | 42.3 | ▼23.2 |
| Reform | Ian Carter | 295 | 5.3 | New |
| Liberal Democrats | Rhona Brown | 247 | 4.4 | ▼6.3 |
| Conservative | Jorge Garcia de Bustos | 147 | 2.6 | ▼1.3 |
| Majority | | 175 | 3.1 | N/A |
| Turnout | | 5,612 | 52.5 | ▲11.3 |
| Green gain from Labour | | Swing | | |

== See also ==
- Manchester City Council
- Manchester City Council elections
