= 1925 Manchester City Council election =

Local election in Manchester

- 2 November 1925

35 of 140 seats on Manchester City Council 71 seats needed for a majority
	First party	Second party	Third party
Party	Conservative	Labour	Liberal
Last election	16 seats, 43.5%	9 seats, 34.6%	8 seats, 19.6%
Seats before	72	32	31
Seats won	16	12	6
Seats after	74	34	28
Seat change	▲2	▲2	▼3
Popular vote	57,896	49,046	23,473
Percentage	42.0%	35.6%	17.0%
Swing	▼1.5%	▲1.0%	▼2.6%
	Fourth party
Party	Independent
Last election	2 seats, 2.0%
Seats before	5
Seats won	1
Seats after	4
Seat change	▼1
Popular vote	5,011
Percentage	3.6%
Swing	▲1.6%
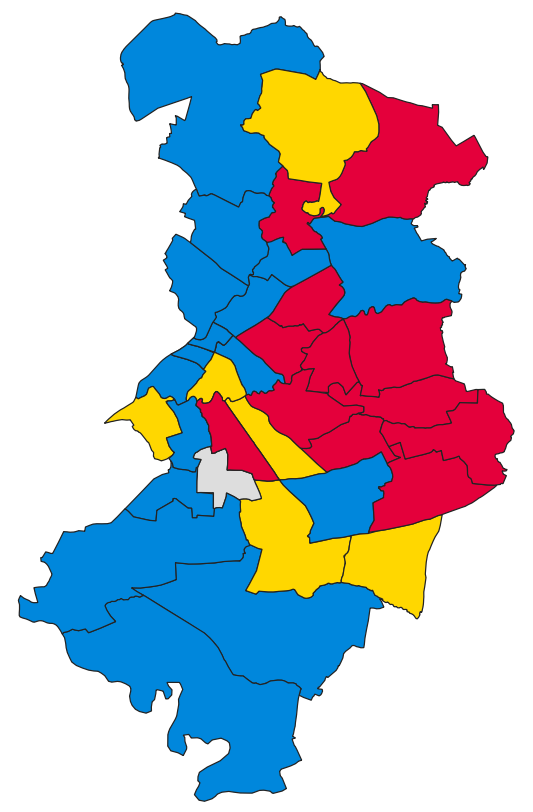
- Map of results of 1925 election
Leader of the Council before election
Conservative
Leader of the Council after election
Conservative

Elections to Manchester City Council were held on Monday, 2 November 1925. One third of the councillors seats were up for election, with each successful candidate to serve a three-year term of office. The Conservative Party retained overall control of the council.

== Election result ==
Party	Votes		Seats			Full Council	
Conservative Party	57,896 (42.0%)	▼1.5	16 (45.7%)	16 / 35	▲2	74 (52.9%)	74 / 140
Labour Party	49,046 (35.6%)	▲1.0	12 (34.3%)	12 / 35	▲2	34 (24.3%)	34 / 140
Liberal Party	23,473 (17.0%)	▼2.6	6 (17.1%)	6 / 35	▼3	28 (20.0%)	28 / 140
Independent	5,011 (3.6%)	▲1.6	1 (2.9%)	1 / 35	▼1	4 (2.3%)	4 / 140
English League for the Taxation of Land Values	1,973 (1.4%)	N/A	0 (0.0%)	0 / 35	N/A	0 (0.0%)	0 / 140
Residents	328 (0.2%)	N/A	0 (0.0%)	0 / 35	N/A	0 (0.0%)	0 / 140

=== Full council ===
↓
34	28	4	74

== Ward results ==
=== All Saints' ===
All Saints'
Party	Candidate	Votes	%	±%
Labour	J. E. Hutchinson*	1,837	50.2	+10.7
Liberal	W. G. Coltart	1,824	49.8	N/A
Majority		13	0.4	
Turnout		3,661	43.9	
Labour hold		Swing		

=== Ardwick ===
Ardwick
Party	Candidate	Votes	%	±%
Labour	H. Weate*	3,401	53.8	+9.0
Conservative	J. Whittle	2,925	46.2	−9.0
Majority		476	7.6	
Turnout		6,326	60.8	
Labour hold		Swing		

=== Beswick ===
Beswick
Party	Candidate	Votes	%	±%
Labour	H. Thorneycroft*	4,754	63.0	N/A
Conservative	J. W. Brownhill	2,792	37.0	N/A
Majority		1,962	26.0	N/A
Turnout		7,546	61.6	N/A
Labour hold		Swing		

=== Blackley ===
Blackley
Party	Candidate	Votes	%	±%
Liberal	W. Bentley*	3,038	65.9	N/A
Labour	F. Gregson	1,570	34.1	+2.3
Majority		1,468	31.8	
Turnout		4,608	51.1	
Liberal hold		Swing		

=== Bradford ===
Bradford
Party	Candidate	Votes	%	±%
Labour	J. W. Sutton*	3,700	59.9	N/A
Conservative	J. G. Kilbourne	2,482	40.1	N/A
Majority		1,218	19.8	N/A
Turnout		6,182	58.2	N/A
Labour hold		Swing		

=== Cheetham ===
Cheetham
Party	Candidate	Votes	%	±%
Conservative	J. C. Kidd*	3,006	64.3	N/A
Labour	J. T. Abbott	1,672	35.7	N/A
Majority		1,334	28.6	N/A
Turnout		4,678	55.0	N/A
Conservative hold		Swing		

=== Chorlton-cum-Hardy ===
Chorlton-cum-Hardy
Party	Candidate	Votes	%	±%
Conservative	W. T. Burrows	4,888	51.9	+4.9
Liberal	W. E. Davies*	4,308	45.7	−7.3
Residents	N. E. Walker	224	2.4	N/A
Majority		580	6.2	
Turnout		9,420	58.3	
Conservative gain from Liberal		Swing		

=== Collegiate Church ===
Collegiate Church
Party	Candidate	Votes	%	±%
Conservative	J. Elliott*	uncontested		
Conservative hold		Swing		

=== Collyhurst ===
Collyhurst
Party	Candidate	Votes	%	±%
Conservative	F. Brine*	3,035	50.2	−1.2
Labour	P. L. Martin	3,013	49.8	+1.2
Majority		22	0.4	−2.4
Turnout		6,048	64.1	
Conservative hold		Swing		

=== Crumpsall ===
Crumpsall
Party	Candidate	Votes	%	±%
Conservative	W. Dennison*	2,278	71.1	N/A
Labour	F. C. Mason	925	28.9	N/A
Majority		1,353	42.2	N/A
Turnout		3,203	57.4	N/A
Conservative hold		Swing		

=== Didsbury ===
Didsbury
Party	Candidate	Votes	%	±%
Conservative	H. Levinstein	2,360	59.5	+22.4
Liberal	J. W. Hampson	1,605	40.5	−22.4
Majority		755	19.0	
Turnout		3,965	63.6	
Conservative gain from Liberal		Swing		

=== Exchange ===
Exchange
Party	Candidate	Votes	%	±%
Conservative	G. L. Hardcastle*	570	63.5	N/A
Liberal	E. Barker	327	36.5	N/A
Majority		243	27.0	N/A
Turnout		897	53.6	N/A
Conservative hold		Swing		

=== Gorton North ===
Gorton North
Party	Candidate	Votes	%	±%
Labour	T. F. Regan	uncontested		
Labour hold		Swing		

=== Gorton South ===
Gorton South
Party	Candidate	Votes	%	±%
Labour	A. Lee*	uncontested		
Labour hold		Swing		

=== Harpurhey ===
Harpurhey
Party	Candidate	Votes	%	±%
Labour	R. Lundy*	3,040	50.4	+5.2
Conservative	E. E. Walsh	2,992	49.6	−5.2
Majority		48	0.8	
Turnout		6,032	61.0	
Labour hold		Swing		

=== Levenshulme ===
Levenshulme
Party	Candidate	Votes	%	±%
Liberal	M. E. Mitchell*	uncontested		
Liberal hold		Swing		

=== Longsight ===
Longsight
Party	Candidate	Votes	%	±%
Conservative	W. Cundiff*	3,783	67.6	+22.0
Co-operative Party	T. Anderson	1,536	27.4	N/A
Independent	M. E. Greenwood	280	5.0	−15.1
Majority		2,247	40.2	+14.7
Turnout		5,599	54.4	
Conservative hold		Swing		

=== Medlock Street ===
Medlock Street
Party	Candidate	Votes	%	±%
Conservative	C. H. S. Redmond*	3,181	58.0	−11.5
Labour	E. Chorlton	2,306	42.0	+11.8
Majority		875	16.0	−23.3
Turnout		5,487	44.7	
Conservative hold		Swing		

=== Miles Platting ===
Miles Platting
Party	Candidate	Votes	%	±%
Labour	D. Taylor	3,939	53.4	+3.5
Conservative	J. Travis*	3,436	46.6	−3.5
Majority		503	6.8	
Turnout		7,375	72.0	
Labour gain from Conservative		Swing		

=== Moss Side East ===
Moss Side East
Party	Candidate	Votes	%	±%
Independent	E. Hales*	2,032	49.0	N/A
Conservative	R. McDowell	2,009	48.5	+1.9
Residents	A. R. Edwards	87	2.1	−0.6
Residents	A. M. Edwards	17	0.4	−2.3
Majority		23	0.5	
Turnout		4,145	50.9	
Independent hold		Swing		

=== Moss Side West ===
Moss Side West
Party	Candidate	Votes	%	±%
Conservative	J. H. Birley*	2,511	56.0	+3.7
English League for the Taxation of Land Values	A. H. Weller	1,973	44.0	N/A
Majority		538	12.0	+7.4
Turnout		4,484	49.9	
Conservative hold		Swing		

=== Moston ===
Moston
Party	Candidate	Votes	%	±%
Labour	W. R. Mellor*	3,028	58.6	+11.7
Liberal	A. Forsyth	2,140	41.4	+22.6
Majority		888	17.2	+4.6
Turnout		5,168	58.4	
Labour hold		Swing		

=== New Cross ===
New Cross
Party	Candidate	Votes	%	±%
Labour	T. M. Larrad	3,223	52.0	−0.4
Conservative	J. Milner*	2,975	48.0	N/A
Majority		248	4.0	−0.8
Turnout		6,198	62.1	
Labour gain from Conservative		Swing		

=== Newton Heath ===
Newton Heath
Party	Candidate	Votes	%	±%
Conservative	H. F. Robinson*	2,905	50.3	N/A
Labour	H. Frankland	2,866	49.7	+11.3
Majority		39	0.6	
Turnout		5,771	62.7	
Conservative hold		Swing		

=== Openshaw ===
Openshaw
Party	Candidate	Votes	%	±%
Labour	J. Toole*	uncontested		
Labour hold		Swing		

=== Oxford ===
Oxford
Party	Candidate	Votes	%	±%
Liberal	R. Noton Barclay*	uncontested		
Liberal hold		Swing		

=== Rusholme ===
Rusholme
Party	Candidate	Votes	%	±%
Liberal	E. F. M. Sutton*	3,187	81.2	N/A
Labour	W. Davis	740	18.8	N/A
Majority		2,447	62.4	N/A
Turnout		3,927	44.7	N/A
Liberal hold		Swing		

=== St. Ann's ===
St. Ann's
Party	Candidate	Votes	%	±%
Conservative	E. Green*	736	63.2	N/A
Liberal	J. G. Haworth	428	36.8	N/A
Majority		308	26.4	N/A
Turnout		1,164	47.6	N/A
Conservative hold		Swing		

=== St. Clement's ===
St. Clement's
Party	Candidate	Votes	%	±%
Conservative	H. D. Judson	1,000	50.6	N/A
Liberal	W. H. Wood	975	49.4	N/A
Majority		25	1.2	N/A
Turnout		1,975	64.3	N/A
Conservative gain from Liberal		Swing		

=== St. George's ===
St. George's
Party	Candidate	Votes	%	±%
Liberal	G. Oddy*	2,530	50.8	+30.0
Labour	J. G. Clapham	2,449	49.2	+9.7
Majority		81	1.6	
Turnout		4,979	42.2	
Liberal hold		Swing		

=== St. John's ===
St. John's
Party	Candidate	Votes	%	±%
Conservative	T. R. Hewlett*	uncontested		
Conservative hold		Swing		

=== St. Luke's ===
St. Luke's
Party	Candidate	Votes	%	±%
Liberal	T. R. Ackroyd*	3,111	55.2	+17.4
Conservative	T. Harrison	2,522	44.8	−17.4
Majority		589	10.4	
Turnout		5,633	53.6	
Liberal hold		Swing		

=== St. Mark's ===
St. Mark's
Party	Candidate	Votes	%	±%
Labour	G. Hall*	4,056	67.8	+5.3
Conservative	E. Filmer	1,925	32.2	+1.4
Majority		2,131	35.6	+3.9
Turnout		5,981	58.3	
Labour hold		Swing		

=== St. Michael's ===
St. Michael's
Party	Candidate	Votes	%	±%
Conservative	G. H. Dale*	1,772	39.5	−2.6
Labour	E. Downey	1,747	39.0	−18.9
Independent	J. Hoy	965	21.5	N/A
Majority		25	0.5	
Turnout		4,484	68.3	
Conservative hold		Swing		

=== Withington ===
Withington
Party	Candidate	Votes	%	±%
Conservative	W. Challoner	1,813	41.9	−8.0
Independent	L. F. Massey*	1,734	40.1	N/A
Labour	W. Johnston	780	18.0	N/A
Majority		79	1.8	
Turnout		4,327	63.2	
Conservative gain from Independent		Swing		

== Aldermanic election ==
=== Aldermanic election, 9 November 1925 ===
At the meeting of the council on 9 November 1925, the terms of office of seventeen aldermen expired.

The following seventeen were elected as aldermen by the council on 9 November 1925 for a term of six years.

Party	Alderman	Ward	Term expires
Liberal	James Bowes*	Miles Platting	1931
Liberal	James Bowie*	St. Clement's	1931
Conservative	Henry Richard Box*	Moss Side East	1931
Conservative	Tom Cook*	Openshaw	1931
Labour	Tom Fox*	Bradford	1931
Liberal	Hermann Goldschmidt*	Collyhurst	1931
Conservative	Walter Harwood*	Didsbury	1931
Conservative	T. H. Hinchcliffe	St. Luke's	1931
Conservative	Edward Holt*	Crumpsall	1931
Conservative	Christopher Hornby*	All Saints'	1931
Labour	William Jackson*	Blackley	1931
Conservative	William Kay*	St. George's	1931
Liberal	Henry Plummer*	Rusholme	1931
Conservative	Frederick Todd*	New Cross	1931
Conservative	John Turner*	Chorlton-cum-Hardy	1931
Conservative	F. J. West*	Beswick	1931
Conservative	Samuel Woollam	Gorton North	1931

== By-elections between 1925 and 1926 ==
=== By-elections, 24 November 1925 ===
Two by-elections were held on 24 November 1925 to fill vacancies that were created by the appointment of aldermen on 9 November 1925.

==== Medlock Street ====
Caused by the election as an alderman of Councillor Samuel Woollam (Conservative, Medlock Street, elected 2 November 1908) on 9 November 1925, following the resignation on 9 November 1925 of Alderman Fred Pogson (Liberal, elected as an alderman by the council on 9 November 1909).

Medlock Street
Party	Candidate	Votes	%	±%
Conservative	S. H. Holden Wood	1,929	41.1	−16.9
Labour	E. Chorlton	1,876	40.0	−2.0
Liberal	W. E. Davies	851	18.1	N/A
Independent	N. E. Walker	37	0.8	N/A
Majority		53	1.1	−14.9
Turnout		4,693		
Conservative hold		Swing		

==== St. Luke's ====
Caused by the election as an alderman of Councillor T. H. Hinchcliffe (Conservative, St. Luke's, elected 2 November 1908) on 9 November 1925, following the death on 20 October 1925 of Alderman William Lane-Scott (Conservative, elected as an alderman by the council on 20 June 1917).

St. Luke's
Party	Candidate	Votes	%	±%
Conservative	T. Harrison	2,120	55.4	+10.6
Liberal	F. Tebb	1,710	44.6	−10.6
Majority		410	10.8	
Turnout		3,830		
Conservative hold		Swing		
