= 1919 Manchester City Council election =

Local election in Manchester

- 1 November 1919

47 of 140 seats on Manchester City Council 71 seats needed for a majority
	First party	Second party	Third party
Party	Conservative	Liberal	Labour
Last election	15 seats, N/A	12 seats, N/A	5 seats, N/A
Seats before	79	37	18
Seats won	12	11	19
Seats after	61	39	34
Seat change	▼18	▲2	▲16
Popular vote	40,127	19,931	42,605
Percentage	33.1%	16.5%	35.2%
Swing	N/A	N/A	N/A
	Fourth party	Fifth party
Party	Independent	Co-operative Party
Last election	3 seats, N/A	did not contest
Seats before	5	0
Seats won	3	2
Seats after	3	2
Seat change	▼2	N/A
Popular vote	9,163	5,451
Percentage	7.6%	4.5%
Swing	N/A	N/A
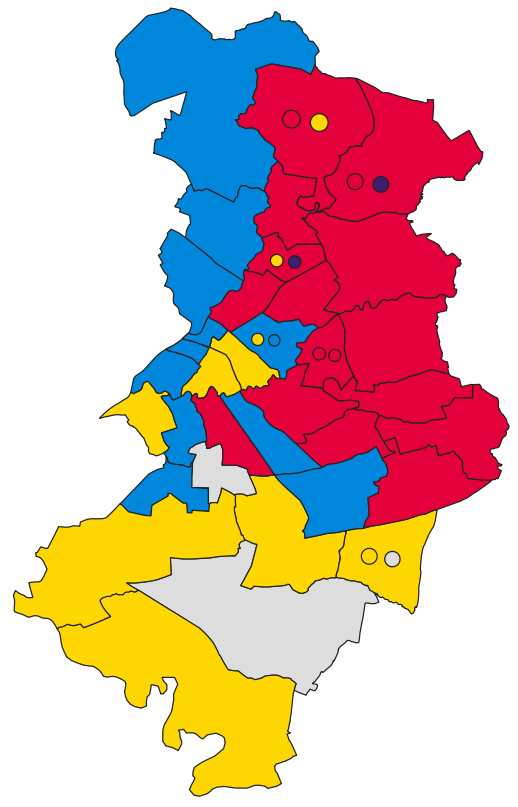
- Map of results of 1919 election
Leader of the Council before election
Conservative
Leader of the Council after election
No overall control

Elections to Manchester City Council were held on Saturday, 1 November 1919. One third of the councillors seats were up for election, with each successful candidate to serve a three-year term of office. The Conservative Party lost overall control of the council. These were the first local elections held in Manchester since the outbreak of the First World War.

== Election result ==
Party	Votes		Seats			Full Council	
Conservative Party	40,127 (33.1%)	N/A	12 (25.5%)	12 / 47	▼18	61 (43.6%)	61 / 140
Liberal Party	19,931 (16.5%)	N/A	11 (23.4%)	11 / 47	▲2	39 (27.9%)	39 / 140
Labour Party	42,605 (35.2%)	N/A	19 (40.4%)	19 / 47	▲16	34 (24.3%)	34 / 140
Independent	9,163 (7.6%)	N/A	3 (6.4%)	3 / 47	▼2	3 (2.1%)	3 / 140
Co-operative Party	5,451 (4.5%)	N/A	2 (4.3%)	2 / 47	N/A	2 (1.4%)	2 / 140
NFDDSS	1,845 (1.5%)	N/A	0 (0.0%)	0 / 35	Steady	1 (0.7%)	1 / 140
Women's Party	1,238 (1.0%)	N/A	0 (0.0%)	0 / 47	N/A	0 (0.0%)	0 / 140
Coalition Labour	719 (0.6%)	N/A	0 (0.0%)	0 / 47	N/A	0 (0.0%)	0 / 140

=== Full council ===
↓
34	2	39	1	3	61

=== Aldermen ===
↓
3	10	22

=== Councillors ===
↓
31	2	29	1	3	39

== Ward results ==
=== All Saints' ===
All Saints'
Party	Candidate	Votes	%	±%
Labour	J. E. Hutchinson	873	53.7	
Independent	H. M. Ross Clyne*	752	46.3	
Majority		121	7.4	
Turnout		1,652	20.6	
Labour gain from Independent		Swing		

=== Ardwick ===
Ardwick
Party	Candidate	Votes	%	±%
Labour	H. Weate	2,355	65.1	
Conservative	J. E. Chapman*	1,264	34.9	
Majority		1,091	30.2	
Turnout		3,619	35.0	
Labour gain from Conservative		Swing		

=== Beswick ===
Beswick (3 vacancies)
Party	Candidate	Votes	%	±%
Labour	M. E. Smith	2,858	63.4	
Labour	P. J. Wall	2,783	61.8	
Labour	W. Robinson	2,772	61.5	
Conservative	T. W. H. Preston*	1,777	39.4	
Conservative	O. R. Whittaker*	1,679	37.3	
Conservative	J. Fiddiham	1,647	36.6	
Majority		995	22.1	
Turnout		4,505	36.3	
Labour win (new seat)				
Labour win (new seat)				
Labour win (new seat)				

=== Blackley ===
Blackley (3 vacancies)
Party	Candidate	Votes	%	±%
Labour	J. D. Canavan	1,767	53.8	
Labour	R. Coppock	1,751	53.3	
Liberal	A. Taylor*	1,180	35.9	
Co-operative Party	W. Holden	1,090	33.2	
Conservative	J. Lees	1,082	32.9	
Conservative	R. H. Morris	1,034	31.5	
Liberal	T. S. Williams*	1,000	30.5	
Conservative	J. W. Howarth	947	28.8	
Majority		90	2.7	
Turnout		3,284	41.9	
Labour win (new seat)				
Labour win (new seat)				
Liberal win (new seat)				

=== Bradford ===
Bradford
Party	Candidate	Votes	%	±%
Labour	J. W. Sutton	2,263	57.1	
Conservative	G. W. Pendlebury*	1,699	42.9	
Majority		569	14.4	
Turnout		3,962	42.0	
Labour gain from Conservative		Swing		

=== Cheetham ===
Cheetham
Party	Candidate	Votes	%	±%
Conservative	C. A. Wood*	uncontested		
Conservative hold		Swing		

=== Chorlton-cum-Hardy ===
Chorlton-cum-Hardy
Party	Candidate	Votes	%	±%
Liberal	W. E. Davies	3,414	67.0	
Conservative	J. C. Booth*	1,685	33.0	
Majority		1,729	33.9	
Turnout		5,099	37.3	
Liberal gain from Conservative		Swing		

=== Collegiate Church ===
Collegiate Church
Party	Candidate	Votes	%	±%
Conservative	J. Elliott*	811	48.9	
Liberal	H. A. Nathan	458	27.6	
Independent	D. Gouldman	391	23.6	
Majority		353	21.3	
Turnout		1,660	48.7	
Conservative hold		Swing		

=== Collyhurst ===
Collyhurst (3 vacancies)
Party	Candidate	Votes	%	±%
Labour	M. Jagger	2,359	89.6	
Liberal	H. Lee	1,593	60.5	
Co-operative Party	A. Park	1,454	55.2	
Conservative	H. E. Storey	1,011	38.4	
Conservative	J. H. Stovell	776	29.5	
Conservative	S. Bloor	706	26.8	
Majority		443	16.8	
Turnout		2,633	29.5	
Labour win (new seat)				
Liberal win (new seat)				
Co-operative Party win (new seat)				

=== Crumpsall ===
Crumpsall
Party	Candidate	Votes	%	±%
Conservative	F. Todd*	uncontested		
Conservative hold		Swing		

=== Didsbury ===
Didsbury
Party	Candidate	Votes	%	±%
Liberal	E. D. Simon*	uncontested		
Liberal hold		Swing		

=== Exchange ===
Exchange
Party	Candidate	Votes	%	±%
Conservative	G. L. Hardcastle*	440	73.1	
Liberal	G. Gill	162	26.9	
Majority		278	46.2	
Turnout		602	27.3	
Conservative hold		Swing		

=== Gorton North ===
Gorton North
Party	Candidate	Votes	%	±%
Labour	J. Compton	2,201	75.4	
Coalition Labour	F. Zanetti	719	24.6	
Majority		1,482	50.8	
Turnout		2,920	30.0	
Labour hold		Swing		

=== Gorton South ===
Gorton South
Party	Candidate	Votes	%	±%
Labour	A. Lee	1,875	54.6	
Independent	T. R. Day*	1,562	45.4	
Majority		313	9.1	
Turnout		3,437	37.1	
Labour gain from Independent		Swing		

=== Harpurhey ===
Harpurhey
Party	Candidate	Votes	%	±%
Labour	R. Lundy	2,401	72.6	
Conservative	T. McRoy*	904	27.4	
Majority		1,497	45.3	
Turnout		3,305	35.0	
Labour gain from Conservative		Swing		

=== Levenshulme ===
Levenshulme (3 vacancies)
Party	Candidate	Votes	%	±%
Liberal	M. E. Mitchell*	2,221	53.2	
Liberal	R. S. Harper*	2,191	52.5	
Independent	J. Harrison*	2,104	50.4	
Labour	L. B. Cox	1,854	44.4	
Co-operative Party	E. C. Arundale	1,432	34.3	
Conservative	L. Dobson*	1,381	33.1	
Conservative	F. Fenn*	1,333	32.0	
Majority		250	6.0	
Turnout		4,172	43.6	
Liberal win (new seat)				
Liberal win (new seat)				
Independent win (new seat)				

=== Longsight ===
Longsight
Party	Candidate	Votes	%	±%
Conservative	W. Cundiff*	1,757	52.0	
Labour	E. J. Hookway	1,625	48.0	
Majority		132	4.0	
Turnout		3,382	39.1	
Conservative hold		Swing		

=== Medlock Street ===
Medlock Street
Party	Candidate	Votes	%	±%
Conservative	C. H. S. Redmond	2,130	61.9	
Labour	C. Beamand	1,310	38.1	
Majority		820	23.8	
Turnout		3,440	30.5	
Conservative hold		Swing		

=== Miles Platting ===
Miles Platting
Party	Candidate	Votes	%	±%
Labour	C. E. Wood	uncontested		
Labour gain from Conservative		Swing		

=== Moss Side East ===
Moss Side East
Party	Candidate	Votes	%	±%
Independent	E. Hales	1,953	68.6	
Conservative	F. W. W. Breakell*	895	31.4	
Majority		1,058	37.2	
Turnout		2,848	37.5	
Independent gain from Conservative		Swing		

=== Moss Side West ===
Moss Side West
Party	Candidate	Votes	%	±%
Conservative	J. H. Birley*	uncontested		
Conservative hold		Swing		

=== Moston ===
Moston (3 vacancies)
Party	Candidate	Votes	%	±%
Labour	W. R. Mellor*	2,714	80.9	
Labour	F. Gregson	2,233	66.6	
Co-operative Party	T. Horrocks	1,475	44.0	
Conservative	J. Bostock	1,122	33.4	
Liberal	G. Ward	1,027	30.6	
Conservative	E. Eady	812	24.2	
Liberal	H. Case	678	20.2	
Majority		353	10.5	
Turnout		3,354	39.0	
Labour win (new seat)				
Labour win (new seat)				
Co-operative Party win (new seat)				

=== New Cross ===
New Cross (3 vacancies)
Party	Candidate	Votes	%	±%
Conservative	A. Taylor*	2,515	80.7	
Liberal	J. Milner	2,102	67.5	
Conservative	J. C. Grime*	2,037	65.4	
Conservative	C. B. Walker*	1,455	46.7	
Women's Party	E. Jones Davies	1,238	39.7	
Majority		582	18.7	
Turnout		3,116	32.8	
Conservative win (new seat)				
Liberal win (new seat)				
Conservative win (new seat)				

=== Newton Heath ===
Newton Heath
Party	Candidate	Votes	%	±%
Labour	P. L. Martin	2,119	64.9	
Conservative	J. Goodwin	1,147	35.1	
Majority		972	29.8	
Turnout		3,266	41.3	
Labour gain from Conservative		Swing		

=== Openshaw ===
Openshaw
Party	Candidate	Votes	%	±%
Labour	J. Toole*	uncontested		
Labour hold		Swing		

=== Oxford ===
Oxford
Party	Candidate	Votes	%	±%
Liberal	R. Noton Barclay*	355	51.7	
Conservative	R. W. Shepherd*	331	48.3	
Majority		24	3.5	
Turnout		686	24.5	
Liberal hold		Swing		

=== Rusholme ===
Rusholme
Party	Candidate	Votes	%	±%
Liberal	E. F. M. Sutton*	1,893	66.5	
Conservative	T. T. Shann	1,074	37.7	
Majority		819	28.8	
Turnout		2,848	35.9	
Liberal hold		Swing		

=== St. Ann's ===
St. Ann's
Party	Candidate	Votes	%	±%
Conservative	J. G. Litton*	uncontested		
Conservative hold		Swing		

=== St. Clement's ===
St. Clement's
Party	Candidate	Votes	%	±%
Liberal	J. H. Helm*	uncontested		
Liberal hold		Swing		

=== St. George's ===
St. George's
Party	Candidate	Votes	%	±%
Liberal	G. Oddy*	1,657	60.5	
Conservative	C. A. Toyn	1,081	39.5	
Majority		576	21.0	
Turnout		2,738	25.6	
Liberal hold		Swing		

=== St. John's ===
St. John's
Party	Candidate	Votes	%	±%
Conservative	T. Foden*	uncontested		
Conservative hold		Swing		

=== St. Luke's ===
St. Luke's
Party	Candidate	Votes	%	±%
Conservative	J. Johnson*	1,854	50.1	
NFDDSS	G. Milner	1,845	49.9	
Majority		9	0.2	
Turnout		3,699	37.4	
Conservative hold		Swing		

=== St. Mark's ===
St. Mark's
Party	Candidate	Votes	%	±%
Labour	G. Hall	2,543	51.4	
Independent	R. Turner*	2,401	48.6	
Majority		142	2.9	
Turnout		4,944	49.7	
Labour gain from Independent		Swing		

=== St. Michael's ===
St. Michael's
Party	Candidate	Votes	%	±%
Labour	T. Ronan	1,949	52.8	
Conservative	T. Boyle*	1,741	47.2	
Majority		208	5.6	
Turnout		3,690	57.7	
Labour gain from Conservative		Swing		

=== Withington ===
Withington
Party	Candidate	Votes	%	±%
Independent	L. F. Massey*	uncontested		
Independent hold		Swing		

== Aldermanic elections ==
=== Aldermanic election, 10 November 1919 ===
At the meeting of the council on 10 November 1919, the terms of office of seventeen aldermen expired.

The following seventeen were elected as aldermen by the council on 10 November 1919 for a term of six years.

Party	Alderman	Ward	Term expires
Liberal	William Birkbeck*	New Cross	1925
Liberal	James Bowes*	Miles Platting	1925
Conservative	Henry Richard Box*	Moss Side East	1925
Conservative	Richard Burtles*	Beswick	1925
Conservative	Tom Cook*	Openshaw	1925
Labour	Tom Fox*	Bradford	1925
Liberal	Hermann Goldschmidt*	Collyhurst	1925
Conservative	Walter Harwood*	Didsbury	1925
Conservative	Edward Holt*	Crumpsall	1925
Conservative	Christopher Hornby*	All Saints'	1925
Labour	William Jackson*	Blackley	1925
Conservative	William Kay*	St. George's	1925
Conservative	William Lane-Scott*	St. Luke's	1925
Conservative	Nathan Meadowcroft*	St. Clement's	1925
Liberal	Fletcher Moss*	Chorlton-cum-Hardy	1925
Liberal	Fred Pogson*	Gorton North	1925
Liberal	Henry Plummer*	Rusholme	1925

=== Aldermanic election, 4 February 1920 ===
Caused by the death on 26 December 1919 of Alderman Fletcher Moss (Liberal, elected as an alderman by the council on 1 December 1909).

In his place, Councillor John Turner (Conservative, Chorlton-cum-Hardy, elected 1 November 1904) was elected as an alderman by the council on 4 February 1920.

Party	Alderman	Ward	Term expires
Conservative	John Turner	Chorlton-cum-Hardy	1925

=== Aldermanic election, 17 March 1920 ===
Caused by the death on 23 February 1920 of Alderman Nathan Meadowcroft (Conservative, elected as an alderman by the council on 4 October 1916).

In his place, Councillor James Bowie (Liberal, Moss Side East, elected 1 November 1904) was elected as an alderman by the council on 17 March 1920.

Party	Alderman	Ward	Term expires
Liberal	James Bowie	St. Clement's	1925

=== Aldermanic election, 6 October 1920 ===
Caused by the death on 9 September 1920 of Alderman Richard Burtles (Conservative, elected as an alderman by the council on 9 November 1909).

In his place, Councillor F. J. West (Conservative, Newton Heath, elected 14 February 1905) was elected as an alderman by the council on 6 October 1920.

Party	Alderman	Ward	Term expires
Conservative	F. J. West	Beswick	1925

== By-elections between 1919 and 1920 ==
=== Ardwick, 24 November 1919 ===
Caused by the resignation of Councillor J. M. McLachlan (Labour, Ardwick, elected 1 November 1911) on 6 November 1919.

Ardwick
Party	Candidate	Votes	%	±%
Labour	R. C. Wallhead	1,683	50.1	−15.0
Conservative	J. E. Chapman	1,678	49.9	+15.0
Majority		5	0.2	−30.0
Turnout		3,361	33.7	−1.3
Labour hold		Swing		

=== Chorlton-cum-Hardy, 21 February 1920 ===
Caused by the election as an alderman of Councillor John Turner (Conservative, Chorlton-cum-Hardy, elected 1 November 1904) on 4 February 1920, following the death on 26 December 1919 of Alderman Fletcher Moss (Independent, elected as an alderman by the council on 18 November 1909).

Chorlton-cum-Hardy
Party	Candidate	Votes	%	±%
Conservative	J. W. G. Coombs	2,119	50.8	+17.8
Liberal	J. H. Dawson	2,049	49.2	−17.8
Majority		70	1.6	
Turnout		4,168	30.5	−6.8
Conservative hold		Swing		

=== Moss Side East, 30 March 1920 ===
Caused by the election as an alderman of Councillor James Bowie (Liberal, Moss Side East, elected 1 November 1904) on 17 March 1920, following the death on 23 February 1920 of Alderman Nathan Meadowcroft (Conservative, elected as an alderman by the council on 4 October 1916).

Moss Side East
Party	Candidate	Votes	%	±%
Independent	C. B. Howie	1,201	62.7	−5.9
Conservative	J. C. Brister	713	37.3	+5.9
Majority		488	25.4	−11.8
Turnout		1,914	25.2	−12.3
Independent gain from Liberal		Swing		

=== Chorlton-cum-Hardy, 15 June 1920 ===
Caused by the death of Councillor John Coombs (Conservative, Chorlton-cum-Hardy, elected 21 February 1920) on 25 May 1920.

Chorlton-cum-Hardy
Party	Candidate	Votes	%	±%
Conservative	S. T. Rowe	2,992	60.4	+9.6
Liberal	J. H. Dawson	1,965	39.6	−9.6
Majority		1,027	20.8	+19.2
Turnout		4,957	36.3	+5.8
Conservative hold		Swing		
