= Philip Oliver (British politician) =

Philip Milner Oliver CBE (20 August 1884 – 12 April 1954) was a British politician who served for two short terms as Member of Parliament for Manchester Blackley.

== Background ==
Oliver was born on 20 August 1884, in Manchester, the son of J. R. Oliver. He was educated at Bowdon College, Manchester Grammar School and Corpus Christi College, Oxford where he received a Bachelor of Arts. He qualified as a Barrister-at-law.

== Career ==
In 1909, Oliver was called to the bar by Lincoln's Inn and practised on the Northern Circuit. In 1914, he was selected as Liberal party prospective parliamentary candidate for the Knutsford division of Cheshire. This was a Unionist seat that the Liberal had only ever won once, in 1906. The outbreak of war postponed the general election. During the war he served as Honorary County Secretary of the East Lancashire Branch of the British Red Cross Society. He was Liberal candidate for the newly created constituency of Manchester Blackley at the 1918 General Election. He expressed support for David Lloyd George and his Coalition Government, as did his Unionist opponent. As a result, the Coalition Government partners agreed not to jointly endorse either candidate. He came third, behind the Labour candidate;

General election 1918: Manchester Blackley Electorate 24,857
Party	Candidate	Votes	%	±%
Unionist	William James Harold Briggs	7,997	54.6	n/a
Labour	Arnold Ernest Townend	3,659	25.0	n/a
Liberal	Philip Milner Oliver	2,986	20.4	n/a
Majority		4,338	29.6	n/a
Turnout			58.9	n/a
Unionist win				

In a special Honours list of 1920 he was made a Commander of the Order of the British Empire (CBE) for his wartime work with the British Red Cross Society, in 1918 he had been made an Officer of the Order (OBE). Oliver served as Honorary Secretary of the Manchester Liberal Federation. Oliver, along with the overwhelming majority of Manchester Liberals decided to oppose the Coalition Government that had become more dominated by Unionists. He was retained as Liberal candidate for the 1922 General Election, at which he overtook the Labour candidate to finish second;

General election 1922: Manchester Blackley Electorate 25,585
Party	Candidate	Votes	%	±%
Unionist	William James Harold Briggs	9,023	43.3	−11.3
Liberal	Philip Milner Oliver	6,219	29.9	+9.5
Labour	Arnold Ernest Townend	5,580	26.8	+1.8
Majority		2,804	13.4	−16.2
Turnout				
Unionist hold		Swing	-10.4	

In 1923, he had published Whatsoever Things, Fugitive Essays on the Foundations of Democracy. When Stanley Baldwin became Unionist Prime Minister in 1923, he decided to call an election to be fought on the issue of his desire to introduce taxes on imports. Manchester was an area which was known to oppose such measures in its support for Free Trade. Both of Manchester's free trade parties, Liberal and Labour, sought electoral co-operation. As a result, no Labour candidate stood at Blackley, helping Oliver to gain the seat;

General election 1923: Manchester Blackley Electorate 25,927
Party	Candidate	Votes	%	±%
Liberal	Philip Milner Oliver	12,235	62.6	+32.7
Unionist	William James Harold Briggs	7,313	37.4	−5.9
Majority		4,922	25.2	38.6
Turnout			75.4	
Liberal gain from Unionist		Swing	+19.3	

By 1924, with a Labour government in office the political climate had changed and Labour fielded a candidate against Oliver at the general election. This helped ensure the Unionist regained the seat;

General election 1924: Manchester Blackley Electorate 26,374
Party	Candidate	Votes	%	±%
Unionist	William James Harold Briggs	9,737	43.2	+10.5
Liberal	Philip Milner Oliver	6,609	29.3	−33.3
Labour	Wilfrid Andrew Burke	6,195	27.5	n/a
Majority		3,128	13.9	43.8
Turnout			85.5	+10.1
Unionist gain from Liberal		Swing	+21.9	

By the time of the 1929 General Election, Oliver and the Manchester Liberals were at the forefront of the party's radical platform, and despite the presence of a Labour candidate, he was able to re-gain his Blackley seat from the Unionist;

General election 1929: Manchester Blackley Electorate 36,590
Party	Candidate	Votes	%	±%
Liberal	Philip Milner Oliver	11,006	36.4	+5.7
Unionist	William James Harold Briggs	10,118	33.5	−9.7
Labour	Wilfrid Andrew Burke	9,091	30.1	+2.6
Majority		888	2.9	15.4
Turnout			82.6	
Liberal gain from Unionist		Swing	+7.7	

In 1931, following the financial crisis that resulted in the Labour government being replaced by an all-party National Government, Oliver supported the leadership of Sir Herbert Samuel, who had led the Liberal party into the National Government. At the following general election, the Conservatives in Manchester chose to split the National Government vote by standing against sitting Liberal MPs. One of the main issues of the election was Free trade v Import tariffs, as had been the case in 1923. However, unlike then, the Labour party in Manchester chose to split the free trade vote and Oliver thus found himself in a three-way contest and lost his seat;

General election 1931: Manchester Blackley Electorate
Party	Candidate	Votes	%	±%
Conservative	John Lees-Jones	15,717	46.4	+12.9
Liberal	Philip Milner Oliver	11,382	33.6	−2.8
Labour	Wilfrid Andrew Burke	6,752	20.0	−10.1
Majority		4,335	12.8	15.7
Turnout		33,851	84.1	+1.5
Conservative gain from Liberal		Swing	+7.8	

In 1933, he was parachuted in to be the Liberal candidate at the 1933 Altrincham by-election. This was a Conservative seat that the Liberals had last won in 1923. At the 1931 General Election the Altrincham Liberals had decided not to split the National Government vote and the Conservative was returned unopposed. Nationally, the Liberals had resigned their offices in the National Government but continued to sit on the government benches. At a difficult time for the party, Oliver was able to retain the party position and share of the vote when compared to the 1929 election figures;

Altrincham by-election, 14th June 1933 Electorate 78,244
Party	Candidate	Votes	%	±%
Conservative	Sir Edward Grigg	25,392	51.2	+0.5
Liberal	Philip Milner Oliver	15,892	32.0	−0.9
Labour	James Hindle Hudson	8,333	16.8	+0.4
Majority		9,500	19.2	
Turnout			63.4	
Conservative hold		Swing	+0.7	

In 1933, he had published Genesis to Geneva, an essay. By 1935, the Liberal party had moved into opposition to the National Government and Oliver fought the election in direct opposition to his Conservative opponent. However, the Labour party again chose to stand, splitting the anti-government vote and allowing the Conservative to win again;

General election 1935: Manchester Blackley Electorate 44,314
Party	Candidate	Votes	%	±%
Conservative	John Lees-Jones	15,355	44.3	−2.1
Liberal	Philip Milner Oliver	9,893	28.6	−5.0
Labour	WE Davies	9,370	27.1	+7.1
Majority		5,462	15.7	+2.9
Turnout		34,618	78.1	
Conservative hold		Swing	+1.4	

In 1936, he was elected to serve on the Liberal Party Council. In 1939, Oliver had been re-selected as Liberal prospective parliamentary candidate for Blackley. A general election was expected to take place sometime in 1939 and there was some support in the Labour party, not to oppose Liberal candidates who were better placed to defeat Conservative candidates. This feeling was in line with Sir Stafford Cripps advocating a Popular Front to defeat the National Government. In 1939, the Blackley Labour party had no candidate in place. Thus Oliver would have been particularly confident of making a return to parliament. However, the outbreak of war postponed the elections until 1945. In 1944, he had published Back to Balfour on the subject of a Jewish state as promised in the Balfour Declaration. In 1945. Oliver was again the Liberal candidate for Blackley, but the political climate had changed and Labour swept to victory both locally and nationally;

General election 1945: Manchester Blackley Electorate 58,437
Party	Candidate	Votes	%	±%
Labour	John Diamond	19,561	44.7	+17.6
Conservative	John Lees-Jones	14,747	33.7	−10.6
Liberal	Philip Milner Oliver	9,480	21.7	−6.9
Majority		4,814	11.0	n/a
Turnout		43,788	74.8	−3.3
Labour gain from Conservative		Swing	+14.1	

Oliver did not stand for parliament again. He died on 12 April 1954, aged 69.

== Sources ==
- Genesis to Geneva
- Whatsoever Things
- Back to Balfour

Parliament of the United Kingdom
Preceded by Harold Briggs	Member of Parliament for Manchester Blackley; 1923–1924	Succeeded by Harold Briggs
Preceded by Harold Briggs	Member of Parliament for Manchester Blackley; 1929–1931	Succeeded by John Lees-Jones
