= Nall baronets =

Baronetcy in the Baronetage of the United Kingdom

The Nall Baronetcy, of Hoveringham Hall in the County of Nottingham, is a title in the Baronetage of the United Kingdom. It was created on 25 January 1954 for Joseph Nall, who had earlier represented Hulme in the House of Commons as a Conservative. The title is held by his grandson (the third Baronet) Edward William Joseph, who succeeded his father in 2001. He married (2004) Helen Fiona; they have one daughter (b 2005) Georgina Philippa Louise.

== Nall baronets, of Hoveringham Hall (1954) ==
- Sir Joseph Nall, 1st Baronet (1887–1958)
- Sir Michael Joseph Nall, 2nd Baronet (1921–2001)
- Sir Edward William Joseph Nall, 3rd Baronet (born 1952).
