= Manchester Blackley =

Parliamentary constituency in the United Kingdom, 1918–2010

Coordinates: 53.510°N 2.202°W

Manchester, Blackley
- Former borough constituency for the House of Commons
- Boundary of Manchester, Blackley in Greater Manchester for the 2005 general election

- Location of Greater Manchester within England
- County: Greater Manchester

1918–2010
- Seats: One
- Created from: Prestwich, Manchester North West and Manchester North
- Replaced by: Blackley and Broughton

Manchester, Blackley /ˈbleɪkli/ was a borough constituency represented in the House of Commons of the Parliament of the United Kingdom located in Northern Greater Manchester which existed from 1918 to 2010. It elected one Member of Parliament (MP) by the first past the post system of election. In boundary changes for the 2010 general election it was replaced by Blackley and Broughton. Today the area is part of Blackley and Middleton South.

== Boundaries ==
Manchester Blackley in Lancashire, boundaries used 1974–1983

1918–1974: The County Borough of Manchester wards of Blackley, Crumpsall, and Moston.

1974–1983: The County Borough of Manchester wards of Blackley, Charlestown, Crumpsall, Lightbowne, and Moston.

1983–2010: The City of Manchester wards of Blackley, Charlestown, Crumpsall, Harpurhey, Lightbowne, and Moston.

This constituency was one of Labour's safest seats, though prior to 1964 it was regarded as a reasonably safe Conservative seat, with the party only gaining the seat once, in their 1945 landslide victory. Located in the North of the city, it included the overspill area of Blackley, the deprived inner-city area of Harpurhey, and the districts of Moston, Crumpsall and Charlestown.

=== Boundary review ===
From 2010 this seat was abolished, and its constituents form one part of the Blackley and Broughton seat with two electoral wards from Salford.

== Members of Parliament ==
Election	Member	Party
1918	Harold Briggs	Conservative
1923	Philip Oliver	Liberal
1924	Harold Briggs	Conservative
1929	Philip Oliver	Liberal
1931	John Lees-Jones	Conservative
1945	Jack Diamond	Labour
1951	Eric Johnson	Conservative
1964	Paul Rose	Labour
1979	Ken Eastham	Labour
1997	Graham Stringer	Labour
2010	constituency abolished: see Blackley and Broughton	

== Elections ==
=== Elections in the 2000s ===
General election 2005: Manchester Blackley
Party	Candidate	Votes	%	±%
Labour	Graham Stringer	17,187	62.3	−6.6
Liberal Democrats	Iain Donaldson	5,160	18.7	+7.3
Conservative	Amar Ahmed	3,690	13.4	−1.0
UKIP	Roger Bullock	1,554	5.6	New
Majority		12,027	43.6	−10.8
Turnout		27,591	45.8	+0.9
Labour hold		Swing	−7.0	

General election 2001: Manchester Blackley
Party	Candidate	Votes	%	±%
Labour	Graham Stringer	18,285	68.9	−1.1
Conservative	Lance Stanbury	3,821	14.4	−0.9
Liberal Democrats	Gary Riding	3,015	11.4	+0.4
Socialist Labour	Kenneth Barr	485	1.8	New
Socialist Alliance	Karren Reissmann	461	1.7	New
Anti-Corruption Forum	Aziz Bhatti	456	1.7	New
Majority		14,464	54.4	−0.4
Turnout		26,523	44.9	−12.3
Labour hold		Swing	−7.0	

=== Elections in the 1990s ===
General election 1997: Manchester Blackley
Party	Candidate	Votes	%	±%
Labour	Graham Stringer	25,042	70.0	+9.8
Conservative	Steve Barclay	5,454	15.3	−12.5
Liberal Democrats	Simon D. Wheale	3,937	11.0	−0.3
Referendum	Paul Stayner	1,323	3.7	New
Majority		19,588	54.8	+22.4
Turnout		35,756	57.2	−12.1
Labour hold		Swing	+11.2	

General election 1992: Manchester Blackley
Party	Candidate	Votes	%	±%
Labour	Ken Eastham	23,031	60.2	+7.8
Conservative	William Hobhouse	10,642	27.8	−1.0
Liberal Democrats	Simon D. Wheale	4,324	11.3	−7.5
Natural Law	Michael P. Kennedy	288	0.8	New
Majority		12,389	32.4	+8.8
Turnout		38,285	69.3	−3.6
Labour hold		Swing	+4.4	

=== Elections in the 1980s ===
General election 1987: Manchester Blackley
Party	Candidate	Votes	%	±%
Labour	Ken Eastham	22,476	52.4	+4.3
Conservative	Krishan Nath	12,354	28.8	−3.8
SDP	Harvey Showman	8,041	18.8	New
Majority		10,122	23.6	+8.2
Turnout		42,871	72.9	+3.2
Labour hold		Swing	+4.1	

General election 1983: Manchester Blackley
Party	Candidate	Votes	%	±%
Labour	Ken Eastham	20,132	48.1	−2.8
Conservative	Peter C.J. Ridgway	13,676	32.6	+0.1
Liberal	John Cookson	8,081	19.3	+5.1
Majority		6,456	15.4	−3.0
Turnout		41,889	69.7	−3.6
Labour hold		Swing	−1.5	

=== Elections in the 1970s ===
General election 1979: Manchester Blackley
Party	Candidate	Votes	%	±%
Labour	Ken Eastham	20,346	50.4	−0.5
Conservative	Arthur Green	15,842	39.2	+3.7
Liberal	James Ashley	3,868	9.6	−4.6
National Front	Nigel Wallace	326	0.8	−1.6
Majority		4,504	11.2	−7.2
Turnout		40,382	76.4	+5.8
Labour hold		Swing	−2.1	

General election October 1974: Manchester Blackley
Party	Candidate	Votes	%	±%
Labour	Paul Rose	19,720	50.9	+4.1
Conservative	A. Lea	12,601	32.5	−1.0
Liberal	D. Jackson	5,517	14.2	−5.5
National Front	Herbert Andrew	914	2.4	New
Majority		7,119	18.4	+5.1
Turnout		38,752	70.6	−5.5
Labour hold		Swing	+3.0	

General election February 1974: Manchester Blackley
Party	Candidate	Votes	%	±%
Labour	Paul Rose	19,369	46.8	−6.4
Conservative	Hugh Roderick Lynn Samuel	13,863	33.5	−13.3
Liberal	Harry Roche	8,155	19.7	New
Majority		5,506	13.3	+6.9
Turnout		41,387	76.1	+6.6
Labour hold		Swing	−3.5	

General election 1970: Manchester Blackley
Party	Candidate	Votes	%	±%
Labour	Paul Rose	21,437	53.2	+0.8
Conservative	Albert Maguire	18,838	46.8	+9.7
Majority		2,599	6.4	−8.9
Turnout		40,275	69.5	−6.0
Labour hold		Swing	−5.5	

=== Elections in the 1960s ===
General election 1966: Manchester Blackley
Party	Candidate	Votes	%	±%
Labour	Paul Rose	21,571	52.4	+10.8
Conservative	David C Stanley	15,271	37.1	−3.8
Liberal	Lawrence Gordon Bayley	4,297	10.5	−5.1
Majority		6,300	15.3	+12.6
Turnout		41,139	75.5	−4.0
Labour hold		Swing	+7.3	

General election 1964: Manchester Blackley
Party	Candidate	Votes	%	±%
Labour	Paul Rose	19,570	43.6	+5.9
Conservative	Eric Johnson	18,348	40.9	−6.1
Liberal	Robert Michael Hammond	7,002	15.6	+0.3
Majority		1,222	2.7	N/A
Turnout		44,920	79.5	−1.7
Labour gain from Conservative		Swing	+6.0	

=== Elections in the 1950s ===
General election 1959: Manchester Blackley
Party	Candidate	Votes	%	±%
Conservative	Eric Johnson	22,163	47.0	−9.0
Labour	Reg Chrimes	17,790	37.7	−6.3
Liberal	Robert Michael Hammond	7,223	15.3	New
Majority		4,373	9.3	−2.7
Turnout		47,176	81.2	+3.9
Conservative hold		Swing	−1.4	

General election 1955: Manchester Blackley
Party	Candidate	Votes	%	±%
Conservative	Eric Johnson	25,395	56.0	+7.0
Labour	John Diamond	19,959	44.0	−0.6
Majority		5,436	12.0	+7.6
Turnout		45,354	77.3	−8.3
Conservative hold		Swing	+3.2	

General election 1951: Manchester Blackley
Party	Candidate	Votes	%	±%
Conservative	Eric Johnson	25,076	49.0	+6.9
Labour	John Diamond	22,804	44.6	+2.3
Liberal	Frank Smith	3,287	6.4	−8.1
Majority		2,272	4.4	N/A
Turnout		51,167	85.6	+0.9
Conservative gain from Labour		Swing	+2.3	

General election 1950: Manchester Blackley
Party	Candidate	Votes	%	±%
Labour	John Diamond	21,392	42.3	−2.4
Conservative	R Jamieson	21,350	42.1	+8.4
Liberal	Henry Donald Moore	7,317	14.5	−7.2
Communist	Ben Ainley	562	1.1	New
Majority		42	0.2	−10.8
Turnout		50,621	85.7	+10.9
Labour hold		Swing	−5.5	

=== Elections in the 1940s ===
General election 1945: Manchester Blackley Electorate 58,437
Party	Candidate	Votes	%	±%
Labour	John Diamond	19,561	44.7	+17.6
Conservative	John Lees-Jones	14,747	33.7	−10.6
Liberal	Philip Oliver	9,480	21.7	−6.9
Majority		4,814	11.0	N/A
Turnout		43,788	74.8	−3.3
Labour gain from Conservative		Swing	+14.1	

=== Elections in the 1930s ===
General election 1935: Manchester Blackley Electorate 44,314
Party	Candidate	Votes	%	±%
Conservative	John Lees-Jones	15,355	44.3	−2.1
Liberal	Philip Oliver	9,893	28.6	−5.0
Labour	WE Davies	9,370	27.1	+7.1
Majority		5,462	15.7	+2.9
Turnout		34,618	78.1	−6.0
Conservative hold		Swing	+1.4	

General election 1931: Manchester Blackley
Party	Candidate	Votes	%	±%
Conservative	John Lees-Jones	15,717	46.4	+12.9
Liberal	Philip Oliver	11,382	33.6	−2.8
Labour	Wilfrid Burke	6,752	20.0	−10.1
Majority		4,335	12.8	N/A
Turnout		33,851	84.1	+1.5
Conservative gain from Liberal		Swing	+7.8	

=== Elections in the 1920s ===
Philip Oliver

General election 1929: Manchester Blackley
Party	Candidate	Votes	%	±%
Liberal	Philip Oliver	11,006	36.4	+7.1
Unionist	Harold Briggs	10,118	33.5	−9.7
Labour	Wilfrid Burke	9,091	30.1	+2.6
Majority		888	2.9	N/A
Turnout		30,275	82.6	−2.9
Liberal gain from Unionist		Swing	+7.7	

General election 1924: Manchester Blackley
Party	Candidate	Votes	%	±%
Unionist	Harold Briggs	9,737	43.2	+5.8
Liberal	Philip Oliver	6,609	29.3	−33.3
Labour	Wilfrid Burke	6,195	27.5	New
Majority		3,128	13.9	N/A
Turnout		22,541	85.5	+10.1
Unionist gain from Liberal		Swing	+21.9	

General election 1923: Manchester Blackley Electorate 25,927
Party	Candidate	Votes	%	±%
Liberal	Philip Oliver	12,235	62.6	+32.7
Unionist	Harold Briggs	7,313	37.4	−5.9
Majority		4,922	25.2	N/A
Turnout		19,548	75.4	
Liberal gain from Unionist		Swing	+19.3	

General election 1922: Manchester Blackley Electorate 25,585
Party	Candidate	Votes	%	±%
Unionist	Harold Briggs	9,023	43.3	−11.3
Liberal	Philip Oliver	6,219	29.9	+9.5
Labour	Arnold Townend	5,580	26.8	+1.8
Majority		2,804	13.4	−16.2
Turnout		20,822		
Unionist hold		Swing	−10.4	

=== Elections in the 1910s ===
General election 1918: Manchester Blackley Electorate 24,857
Party	Candidate	Votes	%	±%
Unionist	Harold Briggs	7,997	54.6	
Labour	Arnold Townend	3,659	25.0	
Liberal	Philip Oliver	2,986	20.4	
Majority		4,338	29.6	
Turnout		14,642	58.9	
Unionist win (new seat)				

No candidate who was endorsed by the Coalition Government.

== See also ==
- List of parliamentary constituencies in Greater Manchester

== Notes and references ==
Craig, F. W. S. (1983). British parliamentary election results 1918–1949 (3 ed.). Chichester: Parliamentary Research Services. ISBN 0-900178-06-X.

== Sources ==
- Pre-1945 MPs taken from https://web.archive.org/web/20060520143047/http://www.manchester.gov.uk/elections/archive/gen1945.htm
