= Harold Briggs (politician) =

British politician

William James Harold Briggs (26 May 1870 – 6 May 1945) was a Conservative Party politician in the United Kingdom who served as member of parliament (MP) for Manchester Blackley from 1918 to 1923, and from 1924, until his defeat at the 1929 general election.

Parliament of the United Kingdom
Preceded by (new constituency)	Member of Parliament for Manchester Blackley; 1918–1923	Succeeded by Philip Oliver
Preceded by Philip Oliver	Member of Parliament for Manchester Blackley; 1924–1929	Succeeded by Philip Oliver
