= Eric Johnson (British politician) =

British politician (1897–1978)

Eric Seymour Thewlis Johnson (8 September 1897 – 22 July 1978) was a British Conservative Party politician.

At the 1945 general election he stood as Liberal candidate for Lancaster and finished third. He left the Liberal Party and joined the Conservatives. At the 1950 general election he stood as Conservative candidate for Droylsden and finished second. At the 1951 general election he was elected as Member of Parliament for Manchester Blackley, defeating the sitting Labour MP Jack Diamond who had retained the seat at the 1950 election with a majority of only 42 votes. Johnson was re-elected in this marginal seat at the 1955 election and again at the 1959 general election, before losing his seat at the 1964 general election to the Labour candidate Paul Rose.

Parliament of the United Kingdom
Preceded by Jack Diamond	Member of Parliament for Manchester Blackley; 1951–1964	Succeeded by Paul Rose
