= Paul Rose (British politician) =

British politician (1935–2015)

Member of Parliament for Manchester Blackley
- In office 1964–1979
- Preceded by: Eric Johnson
- Succeeded by: Ken Eastham

Personal details
- Born: 26 December 1935
- Died: 3 November 2015 (aged 79)
- Party: Social Democratic Party
- Education: Manchester University

Paul Bernard Rose (26 December 1935 – 3 November 2015) was a British Labour Party politician and a leading campaigner against the politics of the National Front.

Born into a Jewish family, Rose was educated at Bury Grammar School and Manchester University. He was chairman of the Manchester Federation of Young Socialists. He became a barrister, called to the bar by Gray's Inn in 1958.

He became Chairman of the Manchester Left Club and edited a youth page for "Labour's Northern Voice" and led the Suez demonstrations in Manchester in 1956. His main interests were industrial safety, Northern Ireland and civil liberties, and he was active in the field of human rights, not least in relation to Greece under the rule of the Colonels.

Rose was elected member of parliament for Manchester Blackley in 1964. He was Parliamentary Private Secretary to Barbara Castle at the Ministry of Transport and after 1970 spoke for the Labour opposition on industrial relations. He was also a member of the All Party Parliamentary Humanist Group. In mid-1978, Rose called for an inquiry into "lesbian attacks" at a prison in Cheshire.

He stepped down in 1979, and later joined the Social Democratic Party in the 1980s.

Rose noted discrimination against Catholics in Northern Ireland and in the early 1960s was one of the first to predict The Troubles. He became Chairman of the Campaign for Democracy in Ulster, and in this role spoke widely on civil rights in Northern Ireland, becoming the focus of Ulster Unionist concerns regarding Westminster's interest in the issue. He was Chairman of the North West Sports Council, and Chairman of the Parliamentary Labour Party Home Office Group. He served on the Council of Europe and was vice-chairman of Labour Campaign for Europe. He was also founder and chairman of the anti-cult organisation Family, Action, Information, and Rescue. He became a coroner in the south of London. He was a Deputy Circuit Judge and a Part Time Immigration and Political Asylum Adjudicator. An atheist and humanist, Rose was a member of the British Humanist Association, which later invited him to be one of its patrons.

Rose was the editor of six books on law, politics and history, including Backbencher's Dilemma and A History of the Fenians In England after publishing The Manchester Martyrs. He prepared a manuscript for publication on the Unification Church called "The Moonies Unmasked"; however, it was not published. He also contributed many articles to newspapers and magazines on history, law and politics.

He died on 3 November 2015 at the age of 79. He was buried with a humanist service.

Parliament of the United Kingdom
Preceded by Eric Johnson	Member of Parliament for Manchester Blackley; 1964–1979	Succeeded by Kenneth Eastham
