= Andrew McElwee =

British trades unionist and Labour Party politician

Andrew McElwee (died 18 June 1968) was a British trade unionist and Labour Party politician.

McElwee joined the Clydebank branch of the Amalgamated Society of Woodworkers in 1907. He subsequently transferred to a union branch in Brixton, London. He was elected to the union's general council and was chairman from 1924 to 1926.

He was nominated as the Labour Party candidate for the Manchester constituency of Hulme with the support of the woodworkers' union, but failed to win the seat at the 1924 general election. In 1925 he was chairman of the Dumbarton and Clydebank Labour Party, and gave evidence to an enquiry into the Clydebank Rents Strike.

McElwee again stood at Hulme at the 1929 general election, and was elected. However, he became involved in a dispute with his sponsoring union, who refused to support him at the ensuing election in 1931. The Divisional Labour Party asked him to stand down as candidate, but he refused to do so, and after a search for a replacement candidate he received the Labour nomination. He was defeated, with the Conservative Party regaining the constituency.

In February 1932 the executive council and a number of officials of the Amalgamated Society of Woodworkers issued summonses alleging criminal libel against the former MP. The allegations centred on statements made in four letters written by McElwee about the union. The letters accused identifiable officials of corruption and of misappropriation of expenses. In May 1932 he entered a plea of guilty to the charges and was bound over to keep the peace on his personal recognisance of £100.

Parliament of the United Kingdom
Preceded by Sir Joseph Nall	Member of Parliament for Manchester Hulme; 1929–1931	Succeeded by Sir Joseph Nall
