= John Lees-Jones =

British politician (1887–1966)

John Lees-Jones (25 September 1887 – 13 January 1966) was a British Conservative Party politician.

He was first elected to Parliament October 27, at the 1931 general election as Member of Parliament (MP) for the Manchester Blackley constituency, and he was re-elected at the 1935 election. At the 1945 general election, he was defeated by Labour's John Diamond and left office on the June 15

Parliament of the United Kingdom
Preceded by Philip Oliver	Member of Parliament for Manchester Blackley; 1931–1945	Succeeded by John Diamond
