= Nall River =

River in Balochistan Province, Pakistan

Nall River: دریائے نال (Urdu); نال کور (Balochi)
- Native name: Naal Kaor (Urdu)

The Nall River (Urdu: دریائے نال) (Balochi: نال کور) is located in the Nall Khuzdar Balochistan نال Khuzdar District, in the southwestern section of Balochistan Province, Pakistan.
