= Charles Nall-Cain =

Charles Nall-Cain may refer to:

- Charles Nall-Cain, 1st Baron Brocket (1866–1934), British businessman and philanthropist
- Charles Nall-Cain, 3rd Baron Brocket (born 1952), British peer, business owner, television presenter and convicted criminal
