= Walter Davies (politician) =

British Insurance Chairman and Liberal Party politician

Walter Davies CBE (1865 – 30 September 1939), was a British Insurance Chairman and Liberal Party politician.

== Background ==
Davies was born the son of John Davies, of Manchester. In 1890 he married Mary Beresford. They had one son and one daughter. He became a JP in 1912. He was appointed a CBE in 1923.

== Professional career ==
Davies was Chairman of the Manchester Insurance Committees. He was Hon. Secretary to the Manchester Committee for National Savings and a Member of the National Committee.

== Political career ==
Davies was Liberal candidate for the Manchester Hulme division at the 1922 General Election, aligned with the main party under the leadership of H. H. Asquith. He was Liberal candidate for Hulme again at the 1923 General Election, after David Lloyd George's National Liberals had merged with the main Liberal party. On both occasions he was unsuccessful and did not stand for parliament again.

=== Electoral record ===
General Election 1922: Manchester Hulme
Party	Candidate	Votes	%	±%
Unionist	Joseph Nall	15,692	57.4	+3.4
Liberal	Walter Davies	11,639	42.6	+13.0
Majority		4,053	14.8	−9.6
Turnout		27,331	70.1	+17.2
Unionist hold		Swing	−4.8	

General Election 1923: Manchester Hulme
Party	Candidate	Votes	%	±%
Unionist	Joseph Nall	10,035	35.8	−21.6
Liberal	Walter Davies	9,603	34.2	−8.2
Labour	Andrew McElwee	8,433	30.0	N/A
Majority		432	1.6	−13.2
Turnout		28,071	71.5	+1.4
Unionist hold		Swing	−6.7	
