= Manchester Hulme =

Parliamentary constituency in the United Kingdom, 1918–1950

- Former borough constituency for the House of Commons

1918–1950
- Seats: one
- Created from: Manchester South West
- Replaced by: Manchester Exchange and Manchester Moss Side

Manchester Hulme was a parliamentary constituency in Manchester which returned one Member of Parliament (MP) to the House of Commons of the Parliament of the United Kingdom from 1918 until it was abolished for the 1950 general election.

== Boundaries ==
The County Borough of Manchester wards of Medlock Street, Moss Side West, and St George's.

== Members of Parliament ==
Election	Member	Party
1918	Joseph Nall	Conservative
1929	Andrew McElwee	Labour
1931	Sir Joseph Nall	Conservative
1945	Frederick Lee	Labour
1950	constituency abolished	

== Election results ==
=== Election in the 1910s ===
Needham

General election 1918: Manchester Hulme
Party	Candidate	Votes	%	±%
Unionist	Joseph Nall	10,895	54.0	
Liberal	Christopher Needham	5,969	29.6	
Independent Labour	Alfred Hilton (Note: Nominee of the United Carters' and Motormen's Association)	2,572	12.8	
Independent	George Milner (Note: Supported by and possibly the nominee of the National Federation of Discharged and Demobilized Sailors and Soldiers)	729	3.6	
Majority		4,926	24.4	
Turnout		20,165	52.9	
Unionist win (new seat)				

=== Elections in the 1920s ===
General election 1922: Manchester Hulme
Party	Candidate	Votes	%	±%
Unionist	Joseph Nall	15,692	57.4	+3.4
Liberal	Walter Davies	11,639	42.6	+13.0
Majority		4,053	14.8	−9.6
Turnout		27,331	70.1	+17.2
Unionist hold		Swing	−4.8	

General election 1923: Manchester Hulme
Party	Candidate	Votes	%	±%
Unionist	Joseph Nall	10,035	35.8	−21.6
Liberal	Walter Davies	9,603	34.2	−8.4
Labour	Andrew McElwee	8,433	30.0	New
Majority		432	1.6	−13.2
Turnout		28,071	71.5	+1.4
Unionist hold		Swing	−6.7	

General election 1924: Manchester Hulme
Party	Candidate	Votes	%	±%
Unionist	Joseph Nall	15,374	48.5	+12.7
Labour	Andrew McElwee	13,070	41.2	+11.2
Liberal	Felix Brunner	3,277	10.3	−23.9
Majority		2,294	7.3	+5.7
Turnout		31,721	77.5	+6.0
Unionist hold		Swing	+0.8	

General election 1929: Manchester Hulme
Party	Candidate	Votes	%	±%
Labour	Andrew McElwee	15,053	43.8	+2.6
Unionist	Joseph Nall	12,588	36.6	−11.9
Liberal	Harry Allan	6,728	19.6	+9.3
Majority		2,465	7.2	N/A
Turnout		34,369	72.6	−4.9
Labour gain from Unionist		Swing	+7.3	

=== Elections in the 1930s ===
General election 1931: Manchester Hulme
Party	Candidate	Votes	%	±%
Conservative	Joseph Nall	25,185	70.0	+26.4
Labour	Andrew McElwee	9,219	25.6	−18.2
New Party	John Pratt	1,565	4.4	New
Majority		15,966	44.4	N/A
Turnout		35,969	73.0	+0.4
Conservative gain from Labour		Swing	+22.2	

General election 1935: Manchester Hulme
Party	Candidate	Votes	%	±%
Conservative	Joseph Nall	17,072	60.3	−9.7
Labour	Barbara Ayrton-Gould	11,221	39.7	+14.1
Majority		5,851	20.6	−23.8
Turnout		28,293	66.7	−6.3
Conservative hold		Swing	−11.9	

=== Elections in the 1940s ===
General Election 1939–40

Another General Election was required to take place before the end of 1940. The political parties had been making preparations for an election to take place and by the Autumn of 1939, the following candidates had been selected;

- Conservative: Joseph Nall
- Labour: G W Dillon
- British Union: B T Parkyn

General election 1945: Manchester Hulme
Party	Candidate	Votes	%	±%
Labour	Frederick Lee	12,034	55.6	+15.9
Conservative	J.C. Currie	9,600	44.4	−15.9
Majority		2,434	11.2	N/A
Turnout		21,634	64.7	−2.0
Labour gain from Conservative		Swing	+15.9	
