= Jack Diamond, Baron Diamond =

British politician (1907–2004)

The Right Honourable The Lord Diamond PC

Chief Secretary to the Treasury
- In office 20 October 1964 – 19 June 1970
- Prime Minister: Harold Wilson
- Preceded by: John Boyd-Carpenter
- Succeeded by: Maurice Macmillan

Member of the House of Lords
- Lord Temporal
- Life peerage 25 September 1970 – 3 April 2004

Member of Parliament for Gloucester
- In office 12 September 1957 – 29 May 1970
- Preceded by: Moss Turner-Samuels
- Succeeded by: Sally Oppenheim

Member of Parliament for Manchester Blackley
- In office 5 July 1945 – 4 October 1951
- Preceded by: John Lees-Jones
- Succeeded by: Eric Johnson

Personal details
- Born: John Diamond; 30 April 1907 Leeds, West Yorkshire, England
- Died: 3 April 2004 (aged 96) Chalfont St Giles, Buckinghamshire, England
- Party: Labour (until 1981; 1995–2004); SDP (1981–88) 'Continuing' SDP (1988–90); Non-affiliated (1990–95)

John Diamond, Baron Diamond, PC (30 April 1907 – 3 April 2004), known as Jack Diamond, was a British Labour Party politician.

Diamond was educated at Leeds Grammar School and became an accountant. Diamond became managing director of Capitol and Provincial News Theatres. He was elected Member of Parliament in 1945 for the Blackley division of Manchester, but lost it in 1951. In 1946 and 1947, he was parliamentary private secretary to the Ministry of Works. He returned to the House of Commons in a 1957 by-election for Gloucester, caused by the death of its Labour MP, Moss Turner-Samuels.

He served as Chief Secretary to the Treasury from 1964, a cabinet position from 1968, and Privy Councillor from 1965. He represented Gloucester until his surprise defeat in 1970 by the Conservative candidate, Sally Oppenheim.

Diamond was appointed to the Privy Council in the 1965 Birthday Honours, and was created a life peer as Baron Diamond of the City of Gloucester on 25 September 1970. In 1981 he left the Labour Party for the new Social Democratic Party (SDP). He led the SDP in the House of Lords from 1982 to 1988 but opposed its merger with the Liberals, associating instead with the Owenite 'continuing' SDP before rejoining Labour in 1995.

== Family ==
Diamond was first married in 1932 and had two sons and a daughter. He had a daughter, Joan, by his second wife, Julie Goodman, whom he married in 1948. They separated in 1966 and divorced 10 years later. Upon his death at 96, he was survived by his children and by his third wife, Barbara Kagan, whom he had married in 1976.

Parliament of the United Kingdom
Preceded by John Lees-Jones	Member of Parliament for Manchester Blackley; 1945–1951	Succeeded by Eric Johnson
Preceded by Moss Turner-Samuels	Member of Parliament for Gloucester; 1957–1970	Succeeded by Sally Oppenheim
Political offices
Preceded by John Boyd-Carpenter	Chief Secretary to the Treasury; 1964–1970	Succeeded by Maurice Macmillan
Party political offices
Preceded by Ian Mikardo	Treasurer of the Fabian Society; 1950–1964	Succeeded by Michael Shanks
Preceded by New position	Leader of the Social Democratic Party in the House of Lords; 1982–1988	Succeeded by Roy Jenkins; Leader of the SLD in the House of Lords; The Baroness Stedman; Leader of the continuing SDP in the House of Lords
