= Joseph Nall =

British politician

Sir Joseph Nall, 1st Baronet
- Nall in 1923

Member of Parliament for Manchester Hulme
- In office 14 December 1918 – 10 May 1929
- Preceded by: Constituency established
- Succeeded by: Andrew McElwee
- In office 27 October 1931 – 15 June 1945
- Preceded by: Andrew McElwee
- Succeeded by: Frederick Lee

Personal details
- Born: 24 August 1887
- Died: 2 May 1958 (aged 70)
- Party: Conservative

Sir Joseph Nall, 1st Baronet, DSO DL (24 August 1887 – 2 May 1958) was a British Conservative politician and industrialist.

He was the son of Joseph Nall of Worsley, Lancashire. In 1904 he joined the family firm of Joseph Nall and Company, carriers and railway cartage agents. In 1906 he joined the Bolton Artillery, a unit of the Volunteer Force. He continued his connection with the successors to the Volunteers, the Territorial Force, serving in Egypt, Gallipoli and France in First World War. He was awarded the Distinguished Service Order in 1918.

At the general election of 1918 he was elected as Conservative Member of Parliament (MP) for the Hulme constituency of Manchester. He became the parliamentary private secretary to the Home Secretary, W C Bridgeman, and was knighted in 1924 as part of Stanley Baldwin's resignation honours.

He lost his parliamentary seat to the Labour Party at the 1929 election, but regained it two years later at the 1931 poll. In May 1935, Nall and four other Conservative MPs asked that the National Government whip be withdrawn from them in protest against proposals to introduce Home Rule to India.

In February 1935 Nall became one of the first people to predict that Sir Winston Churchill would become Prime Minister (even though at the time Churchill was in the political wilderness). Nall observed that ‘If there were a big political crisis … Churchill by virtue of his brains and personality would take the foremost place, and would in that event be accepted by the Tory Party.’

Also in 1935 Nall became chairman of Joseph Nall and Company, and he subsequently held a number of directorships in companies in Northern England. He remained MP for Hulme until the next election in 1945, which was delayed by the Second World War. Nall retired from parliament at this point.

He was the last chairman of the Lancashire Electric Light and Power Company until its nationalisation in 1947. The family firm was also taken over by the state in the following year, when it passed to the British Transport Commission. Nall continued to be the member of a number of other company boards including Lancashire United Transport and Wilson and Walker Breweries.

In 1954 Sir Joseph Nall was created a baronet "of Hoveringham Hall in the County of Nottingham". He died on 2 May 1958, aged 70, and his funeral took place five days later at Hoveringham, Nottinghamshire.

Parliament of the United Kingdom
New constituency	Member of Parliament for Manchester Hulme; 1918–1929	Succeeded by Andrew McElwee
Preceded by Andrew McElwee	Member of Parliament for Manchester Hulme; 1931–1945	Succeeded by Frederick Lee
Baronetage of the United Kingdom
New creation	Baronet (of Hoveringham Hall); 1954–1958	Succeeded by Michael Joseph Nall
