= Haworth baronets =

Baronetcy in the Baronetage of the United Kingdom

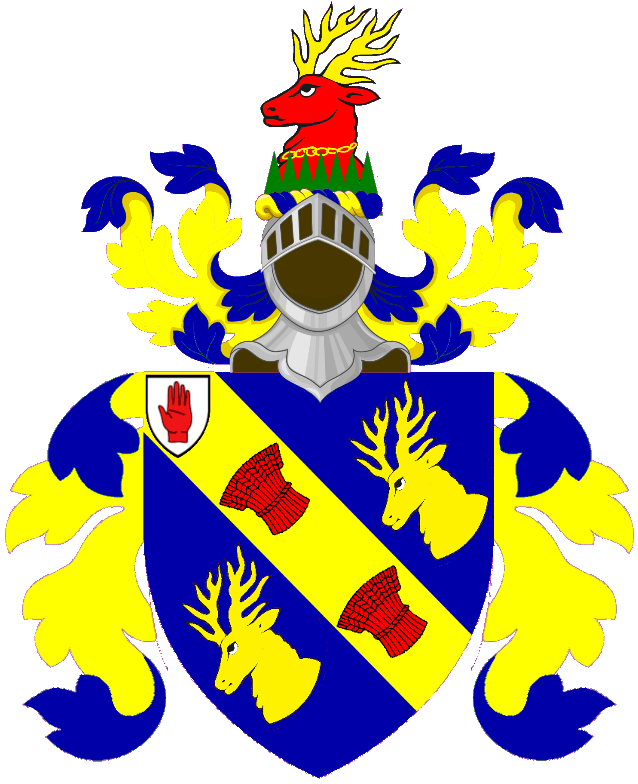
- Escutcheon of the Haworth baronets of Dunham Massey
- Creation date: 1911
- Status: extant
- Arms: Azure on a bend between two stags’ heads couped Or as many garbs Gules
- Crest: Issuant out of grass Proper a stag’s head Gules armed and collared with a chain Or.

The Haworth baronetcy, of Dunham Massey in the County of Chester, is a title in the Baronetage of the United Kingdom. It was created on 3 July 1911 for Arthur Haworth, Member of Parliament for Manchester South from 1906 to 1912.

== Haworth baronets, of Dunham Massey (1911) ==
- Sir Arthur Adlington Haworth, 1st Baronet (1865–1944).
- Sir (Arthur) Geoffrey Haworth, 2nd Baronet (1896–1987).
- Sir Philip Haworth, 3rd Baronet (1927–2019)
- Sir Christopher Haworth, 4th Baronet (born 1951)

The heir apparent is the present holder's son, Oliver Jonathan Christopher Haworth (born 1996).

== Notes ==
Baronetage of the United Kingdom
Preceded by Goodhart baronets	Haworth baronets of Dunham Massey; 3 July 1911	Succeeded by Bowen-Jones baronets
