= Manchester Rusholme =

UK Parliament constituency (1918–1950, 2024 onwards)

- Borough constituency for the House of Commons
- Interactive map of boundaries since 2024
- Location within North West England
- Electorate: 70,692 (March 2020)

Current constituency
- Created: 2024
- Member of Parliament: Afzal Khan (Labour)
- Seats: One
- Created from: Manchester Central & Manchester Gorton

1918–1950
- Created from: Manchester South and Stretford
- Replaced by: Manchester Ardwick, Manchester Gorton and Manchester Withington

Manchester Rusholme is a parliamentary constituency centred on the Rusholme district of Manchester. It returns one Member of Parliament (MP) to the House of Commons of the Parliament of the United Kingdom, elected by the first past the post system. Since 2024, it has been represented by the Labour Party's Afzal Khan, who was MP for Manchester Gorton from 2017 to 2024.

== Constituency profile ==
Manchester Rusholme is an urban constituency in Greater Manchester. It covers the areas of Manchester immediately to the south of the city centre, including Rusholme, Hulme, Chorlton-on-Medlock, Ardwick, Moss Side, Whalley Range, Fallowfield and part of Longsight. Manchester is a major city that grew from textile manufacturing during the Industrial Revolution. The city has undergone strong economic development in the 21st century and is sometimes considered the United Kingdom's "second city".

Curry Mile, Rusholme

Manchester Rusholme is an inner-city constituency with dense terraced housing, and was home to much of the city's industry. It has a very large student population as the location of the University of Manchester and Manchester Metropolitan University, which together have around 85,000 students. As a result, 29% of the constituency's population are between the ages of 18 and 24 compared to 8% nationally. There are high levels of deprivation here; Ardwick and Moss Side fall within the top 10% most-deprived areas in England. House prices are higher than the rest of North West England but lower than the national average.

In general, residents of Manchester Rusholme are very young and well-educated. Most are unmarried and few are homeowners. Household income is low, and a large proportion work in the health and education sectors. A high percentage of residents claim unemployment benefits and the child poverty rate is more than double the UK-wide figure.

The constituency is ethnically diverse. White people made up 41% of the population at the 2021 census. Asians were the largest ethnic minority group at 27%, mostly concentrated in Rusholme and Longsight, with Pakistanis being the largest Asian group. Black people were 18% and made up around half the population in Moss Side. There is also a large Arab community.

At the local city council, all seats in Manchester Rusholme are represented by the Green Party and the Labour Party. Voters overwhelmingly supported remaining in the European Union in the 2016 referendum; an estimated 71% voted to remain compared to the nationwide figure of 48%.

== History ==
The constituency was created by the Representation of the People Act for the 1918 general election, and abolished for the 1950 general election. Under the 2023 review of Westminster constituencies, the seat was re-established for the 2024 general election. At the 2024 election, this seat had the lowest turnout out of all constituencies in the UK, at just 40%.

== Boundaries ==
=== 1918–1950 ===
The constituency was created as Manchester, Rusholme Division, by the Representation of the People Act 1918, and was defined as consisting of three wards of the county borough of Manchester, namely Levenshulme, Longsight and Rusholme.

The division consisted of areas that had been included with Manchester's municipal boundaries in 1890 and 1909. Since the previous redistribution of seats in 1885, they had formed part of the Stretford Division of Lancashire.

The seat was abolished by the Representation of the People Act 1948, with its area being redistributed between Manchester Ardwick (Longsight), Manchester Gorton (Levenshulme) and Manchester Withington (Rusholme) borough constituencies.

=== Current ===
Further to the 2023 boundary review, the re-established seat is composed of the following City of Manchester wards from the 2024 general election (as they existed on 1 December 2020):

- Ardwick, Fallowfield, Hulme, Moss Side, Rusholme and Whalley Range,

It comprises approximately equal parts transferred from Manchester Central (Ardwick, Hulme and Moss Side) and the abolished constituency of Manchester Gorton (Fallowfield, Rusholme and Whalley Range). Remaining parts of Manchester Gorton were included in the new constituency of Gorton and Denton.

== Members of Parliament ==
Election	Member	Party
1918	Robert Burdon Stoker	Coalition Conservative
1919	John Henry Thorpe	Coalition Conservative
1923	Charles Masterman	Liberal
1924	Sir Boyd Merriman	Conservative
1933	Edmund Ashworth Radford	Conservative
1944	Frederick Cundiff	Conservative
1945	Lester Hutchinson	Labour
1949	Lester Hutchinson	Labour Independent Group
1950	constituency abolished, replaced with: Manchester Ardwick; Manchester Gorton; Manchester Withington	
2024	constituency re-established	
2024	Afzal Khan	Labour

== Election results ==
=== Elections in the 2020s ===
General election 2024: Manchester Rusholme
Party	Candidate	Votes	%	±%
Labour	Afzal Khan	15,054	51.9	▼26.7
Green	Thirza Asanga-Rae	6,819	23.5	▲19.2
Workers Party	Mohhamed Bilal	3,660	12.6	N/A
Conservative	Alexandra Marsanu	1,678	5.8	▼3.3
Reform	Joel McGuigan	1,313	4.5	▲0.5
Independent	Faraz Bhatti	342	1.2	N/A
Communist League	Peter Clifford	167	0.6	N/A
Majority		8,235	28.4	▼40.1
Turnout		29,033	40.0	▼16.8
Registered electors		72,604		
Labour hold		Swing	▼23.0	

Manchester Rusholme is one of only two constituencies in England or Wales where the Liberal Democrats did not stand a candidate (the other being Chorley, by convention to not stand against the Speaker). This was due to the nomination paper being rejected after the close of nominations. It also had the lowest turnout in the country at just 40% of registered electors voting in 2024.

=== Elections in the 2010s ===
2019 notional result
Party	Vote	%
Labour	31,554	78.6
Conservative	3,653	9.1
Green	1,709	4.3
Brexit Party	1,621	4.0
Liberal Democrats	1,612	4.0
Turnout	40,149	56.8
Electorate	70,692	

=== Elections in the 1940s ===
General election 1945: Manchester Rusholme
Party	Candidate	Votes	%	±%
Labour	Lester Hutchinson	15,408	43.4	+14.0
Conservative	Frederick Cundiff	15,398	43.4	−19.2
Liberal	Charles Gordon Chappell	4,673	13.2	New
Majority		10	0.0	N/A
Turnout		47,486	74.7	+4.9
Labour gain from Conservative		Swing		

1944 Manchester Rusholme by-election
Party	Candidate	Votes	%	±%
Conservative	Frederick Cundiff	8,430	53.3	−9.3
Common Wealth	Harold William Blomerley	6,670	42.1	New
Independent Labour	C.J. Taylor	734	4.6	New
Majority		1,760	11.2	−22.0
Turnout		15,834	34.7	−35.1
Conservative hold		Swing		

General Election 1940: Another election was due to take place by 1940 but did not take place due to the outbreak of war. The following candidates had already been selected to fight this election:

- Conservative: Edmund Ashworth Radford
- Labour: Lester Hutchinson
- Liberal: Hilda Buckmaster

=== Elections in the 1930s ===
General election 1935: Manchester Rusholme
Party	Candidate	Votes	%	±%
Conservative	Edmund Ashworth Radford	19,678	62.6	−6.7
Labour	Albert Knight	9,258	29.4	+11.8
Independent Liberal	Percy McDougall	2,525	8.0	N/A
Majority		10,420	33.2	−18.5
Turnout		31,461	69.8	−10.2
Conservative hold		Swing		

1933 Manchester Rusholme by-election
Party	Candidate	Votes	%	±%
Conservative	Edmund Ashworth Radford	13,904	50.8	−18.5
Labour	George Woods	11,005	40.1	+22.5
Independent Liberal	Percy McDougall	2,503	9.1	−3.9
Majority		2,899	10.7	−41.0
Turnout		27,412	60.8	−19.2
Conservative hold		Swing		

General election 1931: Manchester Rusholme
Party	Candidate	Votes	%	±%
Conservative	Boyd Merriman	24,817	69.3	+26.5
Labour	Jerrold Adshead	6,319	17.6	−6.7
Liberal	Frank Thornborough	4,658	13.0	−19.9
Majority		18,498	51.7	+41.8
Turnout		35,794	80.0	+1.3
Conservative hold		Swing		

=== Elections in the 1920s ===
General election 1929: Manchester Rusholme
Party	Candidate	Votes	%	±%
Unionist	Boyd Merriman	14,230	42.8	−7.6
Liberal	Philip Guedalla	10,958	32.9	+3.5
Labour	Jerrold Adshead	8,080	24.3	New
Majority		3,272	9.9	−11.1
Turnout		33,268	78.7	−1.1
Registered electors		42,289		
Unionist hold		Swing	−5.6	

General election 1924: Manchester Rusholme
Party	Candidate	Votes	%	±%
Unionist	Boyd Merriman	13,341	50.4	+15.1
Liberal	Charles Masterman	7,772	29.4	−14.0
Communist	William Paul	5,328	20.2	New
Majority		5,569	21.0	N/A
Turnout		26,441	79.8	+1.8
Registered electors		33,147		
Unionist gain from Liberal		Swing	+14.6	

Charles Masterman

General election 1923: Manchester Rusholme
Party	Candidate	Votes	%	±%
Liberal	Charles Masterman	10,901	43.4	+17.3
Unionist	John Henry Thorpe	8,876	35.3	−12.6
Labour	William Paul	5,366	21.3	−4.7
Majority		2,025	8.1	N/A
Turnout		25,143	78.0	+0.2
Registered electors		32,253		
Liberal gain from Unionist		Swing	+15.0	

General election 1922: Manchester Rusholme
Party	Candidate	Votes	%	±%
Unionist	John Henry Thorpe	11,765	47.9	−17.2
Liberal	Ernest Frederick Martin Sutton	6,421	26.1	+6.8
Labour	Albert E. Wood	6,397	26.0	+10.4
Majority		5,344	21.8	−24.0
Turnout		25,583	77.8	+14.9
Registered electors		31,582		
Unionist hold		Swing	−12.0	

=== Elections in the 1910s ===
1919 Manchester Rusholme by-election
Party		Candidate	Votes	%	±%
C	Unionist	John Henry Thorpe	9,394	45.7	−19.4
	Labour	Robert Dunstan	6,412	31.2	+15.6
	Liberal	William Pringle	3,923	19.1	−0.2
	National	Roger Bowan Crewdson	815	4.0	New
Majority			2,982	14.5	−31.3
Turnout			20,544	67.5	+4.6
Registered electors			30,421		
	Unionist hold		Swing	+17.5	

General election 1918: Manchester Rusholme
Party		Candidate	Votes	%	±%
C	Unionist	Robert Burdon Stoker	12,447	65.1	
	Liberal	Walter Butterworth	3,699	19.3	
	Labour	Emmeline Pethick-Lawrence	2,985	15.6	
Majority			8,748	45.8	
Turnout			19,131	62.9	
Registered electors			30,421		
	Unionist win (new seat)				
