= 1919 Manchester Rusholme by-election =

UK parliamentary by-election

- 7 October 1919 (Polling); 20 October 1919 (Declaration)
- Registered: 30,421
- Turnout: 67.5%

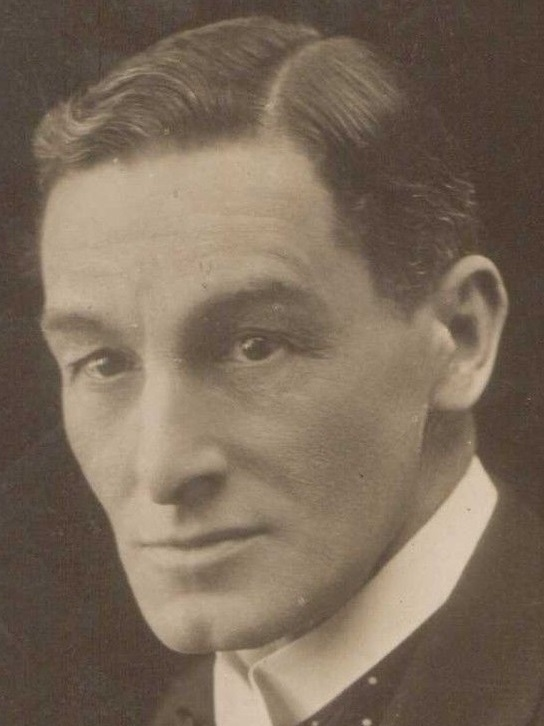
	Uni
Candidate	John Henry Thorpe	Robert Dunstan	William Pringle
Party	Unionist	Labour	Liberal
Alliance	Coalition
Popular vote	9,394	6,412	3,923
Percentage	45.7%	31.2%	19.1%
Swing	▼19.4%	▲15.6%	▼0.2%
MP before election
Robert Burdon Stoker
Unionist
Subsequent MP
John Henry Thorpe
Unionist

The 1919 Manchester Rusholme by-election was a parliamentary by-election held in October 1919 for the British House of Commons constituency of Manchester Rusholme. The by-election was important for shaping the future Labour Party attitude to electoral relations with the Liberal Party.

== Background ==
In September 1919 the Conservative MP Robert Burdon Stoker died. He had previously represented Manchester South since March 1918. At the 1918 general election he had been in receipt of the Coalition Government coupon.

=== Electoral history ===
The seat was created for the 1918 general election partly out of the Unionist/Liberal marginal seat of Manchester South and partly out of the Liberal seat of Stretford. The result at the last general election was;

General election, 1918: Manchester Rusholme
Party		Candidate	Votes	%
C	Unionist	Robert Burdon Stoker	12,447	65.1
	Liberal	Walter Butterworth	3,690	19.3
	Labour	Emmeline Pethick-Lawrence	2,985	15.6
Majority			8,748	45.8
Turnout			19,122	62.9
Registered electors			30,421	
	Unionist win (new seat)			
C indicates candidate endorsed by the coalition government.

== Candidates ==
=== Conservative ===
- John Henry Thorpe, barrister and eldest son of Ven. John Henry Thorpe, Archdeacon of Macclesfield.

==== Potential candidates ====
- Alan Maclure, Lieutenant Colonel and President the Rusholme Division Conservative Association
- Sir Percy Woodhouse, chair of the Manchester District Conservative and Unionist Association
- E. F. Stockton, President of the Manchester Chamber of Commerce
- Sir William Kay, Alderman and Lord Mayor of Manchester

=== Liberal ===
- William Pringle, barrister, former Member for North West Lanarkshire (Jan 1910–1918) and candidate for Glasgow Camlachie in 1906 & Glasgow Springburn in 1918.

=== Labour ===
There was speculation that Labour would not contest the election, allowing the Liberals a clear run at the Unionists. Since the general election, Lib-Lab co-operation, otherwise known as the progressive alliance had seen the two parties gain two Unionist seats each. One of Labour's leading figures, Arthur Henderson was sympathetic to such an arrangement. Henderson had himself been the beneficiary of Lib-Lab co-operation when the Liberals allowed him a straight fight with the Unionists at the 1919 Widnes by-election a month earlier. The Widnes seat neighboured Rusholme and the Liberals had been active in support of Henderson. The local Labour Party insisted on fighting the seat and on 9 September announced a new candidate Dr. Robert Dunstan from Fulham, who had been a Liberal politician up until 1917.

- Dr. Robert Dunstan, barrister, medical doctor, Liberal candidate for Totnes in December 1910, Labour candidate for Birmingham Moseley in 1918.

==== Potential candidates ====
- Hastings Lees-Smith, former Liberal Member for Northampton (Jan 1910–1918) and Liberal candidate for Don Valley in 1918.

=== National ===
The Conservative Party also now faced a challenge from the right when the National Party intervened with first time candidate Capt. Roger Crewdson, after Thomas Nuttall and H. S. Pearce were mentioned.

=== Communist ===
The Communist League attempted to get Anarchist communism activist Guy Aldred to contest the seat, but he did not.

== Campaign ==
The election campaign took place during the great railway strike of 1919. Dunstan, the Labour candidate, sought to appeal to the centre ground by calling for widespread abolition of economic war-time restrictions. Pringle, the Liberal candidate, came out in support of Labour's policy of a capital levy, something that was not Liberal policy. It has been suggested that this stance may have cost him votes, lost to the Unionist candidate. Pringle advocated economic retrenchment to appeal to Unionist voters and also the nationalization of the railways and mines to appeal to Labour voters.

== Result ==
The turnout for the by-election was up on the last general election. The Unionists managed to hold the seat. Their support had fallen, but not much because of the intervention of the National Party. The Labour candidate did particularly well and pushed the Liberal candidate into third place.

Manchester Rusholme by-election, 1919
Party		Candidate	Votes	%	±%
C	Unionist	John Henry Thorpe	9,394	45.7	−19.4
	Labour	Robert Dunstan	6,412	31.2	+15.6
	Liberal	William Pringle	3,923	19.1	−0.2
	National	Roger Crewdson	815	4.0	New
Majority			2,982	14.5	−31.3
Turnout			20,544	67.5	+4.6
Registered electors			30,421		
	Unionist hold		Swing	-18.0	
C indicates candidate endorsed by the coalition government.

== Aftermath ==
The relative success of the Labour Party in such a constituency encouraged them to field candidates in further Unionist/Liberal marginals rather than seek to reconstruct the Progressive Alliance.

Thorpe sat until his defeat by the Liberals in 1923. His son Jeremy Thorpe, became Leader of the Liberal Party. Dunstan continued to be unsuccessful in his bid to enter Parliament. Pringle made a successful return to the House in 1922, winning Penistone for the Liberals. Crewdson was later adopted as the National Party's prospective candidate for North Norfolk, before being adopted by the Unionists after the National Party was wound up.
