= 1912 Manchester South by-election =

UK parliamentary by-election

The 1912 Manchester South by-election was a Parliamentary by-election held on 5 March 1912. The constituency returned one Member of Parliament (MP) to the House of Commons of the United Kingdom, elected by the first past the post voting system.

== Vacancy ==
The Liberal MP for Manchester South, Sir Arthur Haworth was appointed a Lord Commissioner of the Treasury. In keeping with the times he was required to seek re-election in a by-election.

== Electoral history ==
Haworth had gained the seat from the Conservatives at the 1906 general election, and held it since. The previous General Election in December 1910 saw Haworth returned unopposed. The last contested election was the previous General Election;

Arthur Haworth

15 January 1910 general election: Manchester South
Party	Candidate	Votes	%	±%
Liberal	Arthur Haworth	8,121	58.9	−9.1
Conservative	Charles Ward-Jackson	5,669	41.1	+9.1
Majority		2,452	17.8	−18.2
Turnout		13,790	88.4	+5.6
Liberal hold		Swing	-9.1	

== Candidates ==
The Liberal candidate, 47-year-old Arthur Haworth was a Manchester businessman fully established in the community. Haworth again faced just one opponent, the Conservative Philip Glazebrook. Thirty-two-year-old Glazebrook was a Captain in the Cheshire Yeomanry and also involved in business in Manchester. He had not stood for parliament before, though in December 1910 he was chosen as Conservative candidate to contest the constituency of Manchester South at the general election. However, due to an error by his election agent, he arrived at Manchester Town Hall six minutes after nominations had closed, resulting in the unopposed election of Haworth.

== Campaign ==
Polling day was set for 5 March. A vigorous campaign was held, with the main issues being woman suffrage with the Parliamentary Franchise (Women) Bill soon to be debated, Irish Home Rule (the Third Home Rule Bill was currently being debated in parliament) and National Insurance, which had been introduced by the Liberal Government the year before.

== Result ==
The Conservatives gained the seat from the Liberals. The details below, with percentage changes are a change from January 1910.

By-Election 1912: Manchester South Electorate 16,105
Party	Candidate	Votes	%	±%
Conservative	Philip Glazebrook	7,051	52.1	+11.0
Liberal	Arthur Haworth	6,472	47.9	−11.0
Majority		579	4.2	N/A
Turnout		13,523	84.0	−4.4
Conservative gain from Liberal		Swing	+11.0	

== Aftermath ==
In parliament, Glazebrook recorded his vote against the Parliamentary Franchise (Women) Bill. A General Election was due to take place by the end of 1915. By the autumn of 1914, the following candidates had been adopted to contest that election. Unionist Party: Philip Glazebrook, Liberal Party: Sir Arthur Haworth. Due to the outbreak of war, the election never took place. In early 1918 Philip Glazebrook was killed in action. Unionist, Robert Burdon Stoker was returned unopposed in the following by-election. At the 1918 general election, Haworth was Liberal candidate for Manchester Exchange but failed to make a return to parliament.
