= 1918 Manchester South by-election =

UK Parliamentary by-election

The 1918 Manchester South by-election was held on 22 March 1918. The by-election was held due to the incumbent Conservative MP, Philip Glazebrook, being killed in action in the First World War. It was won by the Conservative candidate Robert Burdon Stoker, who was unopposed.
