= Leon baronets =

Title in the Baronetage of the United Kingdom

The Leon Baronetcy, of Bletchley Park in Bletchley in the County of Buckingham, is a title in the Baronetage of the United Kingdom. It was created on 5 July 1911 for Herbert Leon, a financier and Member of Parliament for Buckinghamshire North from 1891 to 1895.

The 3rd Baronet was married to the actress Kay Hammond. Their son, the 4th Baronet, is the actor John Standing. The Leon family owned Bletchley Park in Buckinghamshire between 1883 and 1937.

== Leon baronets, of Bletchley Park (1911) ==
- Sir Herbert Samuel Leon, 1st Baronet (1850—1926)
  - Sir George Edward Leon, 2nd Baronet (1875—1947)
    - Sir Ronald George Leon, 3rd Baronet (1902—1964)
      - Sir John Ronald Leon, 4th Baronet (born 1934) (known as the actor John Standing)
        - (1) Alexander John Leon (born 1965)
          - (2) Thomas Alexander Melford Leon (born 1998)
        - (4) Archie Leon (born 1986)
      - (5) Timothy Michael George Leon (born 1938)
  - Reginald Herbert Leon (1882—1960)
    - Herbert Geoffrey Leon (1907—1911)
    - Richard Neville Leon (1909—1981)
      - (6) David Richard Leon (born 1946)
        - (7) Daniel James Leon (born 1976)
    - Derek Noel Leon (1912—1938)

The heir apparent is the present holder's son, Alexander John Leon (born 1965). His heir apparent is the present holder's grandson, Thomas Alexander Melford Leon (born 1998).

== Arms ==
Coat of arms of Leon baronets

Crest
Issuant from a mural crown Or a demi-lion Gules grasping in the paws a sunflower leaved and slipped Or seeded Sable.
Escutcheon
Gules two sunflowers erect slipped leaved and eradicated Or seeded Sable.
Motto
Seek The Truth

== Notes ==
Baronetage of the United Kingdom
Preceded by Bowen-Jones baronets	Leon baronets of Bletchley Park; 5 July 1911	Succeeded by Lever baronets
