= 1933 Manchester Rusholme by-election =

UK Parliamentary by-election

The 1933 Manchester Rusholme by-election was held on 21 November 1933. The by-election was held due to the appointment to high court of the incumbent Conservative MP, Frank Merriman. It was won by the Conservative candidate Edmund Radford.

== Candidates ==
The executive of the local Liberal association voted by a majority, not to put forward a candidate for the by-election. However, Dr Percy McDougall was nominated and ran as an unofficial Liberal candidate.

== Result ==
Manchester Rusholme by-election, 1933
Party	Candidate	Votes	%	±%
Conservative	Edmund Ashworth Radford	13,904	50.8	−18.5
Labour Co-op	George Woods	11,005	40.1	+22.5
Independent Liberal	Percy McDougall	2,503	9.1	−3.9
Majority		2,899	10.7	−41.0
Turnout		27,412	60.8	−19.2
Conservative hold		Swing		

== Aftermath ==
McDougall stood again at the 1935 general election as an Independent candidate.
