= Milnes Coates baronets =

Baronetcy in the Baronetage of the United Kingdom

Escutcheon of the Milnes Coates baronets of Helperby Hall

The Coates, later Milnes Coates, baronetcy, of Helperby Hall in Helperby in the North Riding of the County of York, is a title in the Baronetage of the United Kingdom. It was created on 29 June 1911 for Edward Coates. He was a member of Coates, Son & Co, stockbrokers, and represented Lewisham from 1903 to 1918, and in the House of Commons from 1918 to 1921.

The 2nd Baronet married Lady Celia Hermione, daughter of Robert Crewe-Milnes, 1st Marquess of Crewe, in 1906, and assumed by deed poll the additional surname of Milnes in 1946. The 4th Baronet in 1990 became Professor of medical microbiology at St George's Hospital Medical School, London.

== Coates, later Milnes Coates baronets, of Helperby Hall (1911) ==
- Sir Edward Feetham Coates, 1st Baronet (1853–1921)
- Sir Clive Milnes Coates, 2nd Baronet (1879–1971)
- Sir Robert Edward James Clive Milnes Coates, 3rd Baronet (1907–1982)
- Sir Anthony Robert Milnes Coates, 4th Baronet (born 1948)

The heir apparent is the present holder's son Thomas Anthony Milnes Coates (born 1986).

== See also ==
- Marquess of Crewe
- Milnes baronets
- Coates baronets
- Coats baronets

Baronetage of the United Kingdom
Preceded by Butlin baronets	Coates baronets of Helperby Hall; 29 June 1911	Succeeded by Everard baronets
