= Everard baronets of Randlestown (1911) =

Baronetcy

Everard baronets
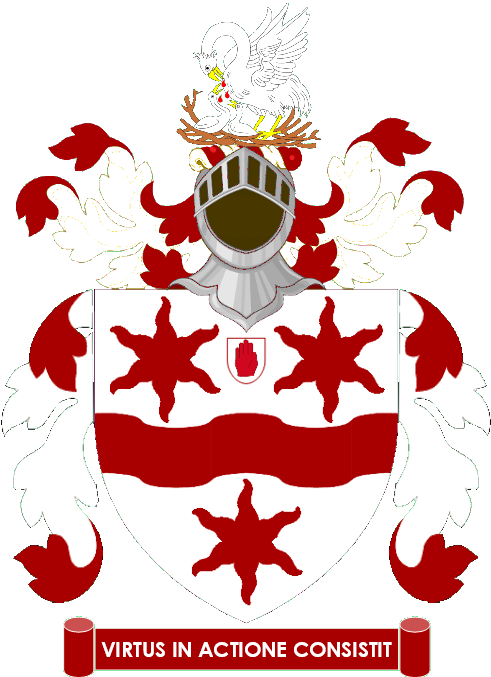
- Escutcheon of the Everard baronets of Randlestown
- Creation date: 1911
- Status: extant
- Motto: Virtus In Actione Consistit, Valor lies in action
- Arms: Argent a fess wavy between three estoiles Gules
- Crest: A pelican in her piety Proper

The Everard baronetcy, of Randlestown in the County of Meath, was created in the Baronetage of the United Kingdom on 30 June 1911 for Nugent Everard. He was Lord-Lieutenant of County Meath, and in 1883 High Sheriff of the county. Later he was Senator of the Irish Free State, from 1922 to 1928.

== Everard baronets, of Randlestown (1911) ==
- Sir Nugent Talbot Everard, 1st Baronet (1849–1929)
- Sir Richard William Everard, 2nd Baronet (1874–1929)
- Sir Nugent Henry Everard, 3rd Baronet (1905–1984)
- Sir Robin Charles Everard, 4th Baronet (1939–2010)
- Sir Henry Peter Charles Everard, 5th Baronet (born 1970)

The heir apparent is the present holder's son, Benjamin Richard Nugent Everard (born 2005).

== Notes ==
Baronetage of the United Kingdom
Preceded by Coates baronets	Everard baronets of Randlestown; 30 June 1911	Succeeded by Goodhart baronets
