= John Henry Thorpe =

British Conservative politician (1887–1944)

John Henry Thorpe OBE KC (7 August 1887 – 31 October 1944) was a British Conservative politician.

Thorpe was the eldest son of the Venerable John Henry Thorpe, Archdeacon of Macclesfield. He was educated at St John's School, Leatherhead and Trinity College, Oxford.

Thorpe trained as a barrister (later becoming Recorder of Blackburn) and entered the Commons in 1919 as MP for Manchester Rusholme. During his tenure, he married Ursula Norton-Griffiths (the eldest daughter of John Norton-Griffiths) on 19 December 1922, and their son was the Liberal MP (John) Jeremy Thorpe (1929–2014).

Parliament of the United Kingdom
Preceded by Robert Stoker	Member of Parliament for Manchester Rusholme; 1919–1923	Succeeded by Charles Masterman
