= Edmund Ashworth Radford =

British politician (1881–1944)

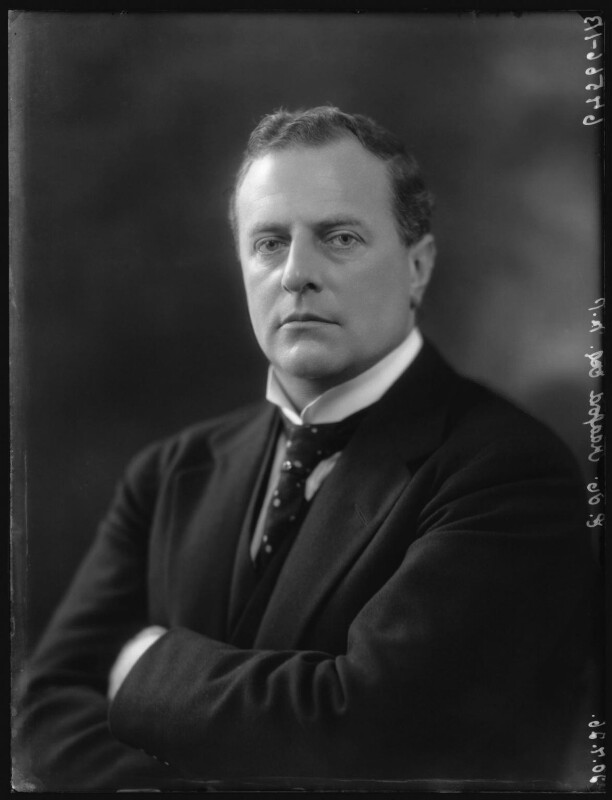
Radford in 1926

Edmund Ashworth Radford (February 1881 – 27 May 1944) was a British Conservative politician.

He was the son of George Radford of Manchester and Church Stretton. Following education at Buxton College he became a chartered accountant in 1902.

At the 1924 general election, Radford was elected as Member of Parliament (MP) for Salford South, unseating the sitting Labour MP, Joe Toole. Five years later Toole regained the seat for Labour.

A by-election was held at Manchester Rusholme in November 1933, and Radford held the seat for the Conservatives. He was re-elected at the 1935 general election.

Radford died at his home in Wilmslow, Cheshire in May 1944, aged 63.

Parliament of the United Kingdom
Preceded by Joseph Toole	Member of Parliament for Salford South; 1924 – 1929	Succeeded by Joseph Toole
Preceded by Sir Frank Boyd Merriman	Member of Parliament for Manchester Rusholme; 1933 – 1944	Succeeded by Frederick William Cundiff
