= Jerusalem War Cemetery (World War I) =

Commonwealth War Graves Commission cemetery in Jerusalem

Coordinates: 31°47′54″N 35°14′23″E

- Commonwealth War Graves Commission
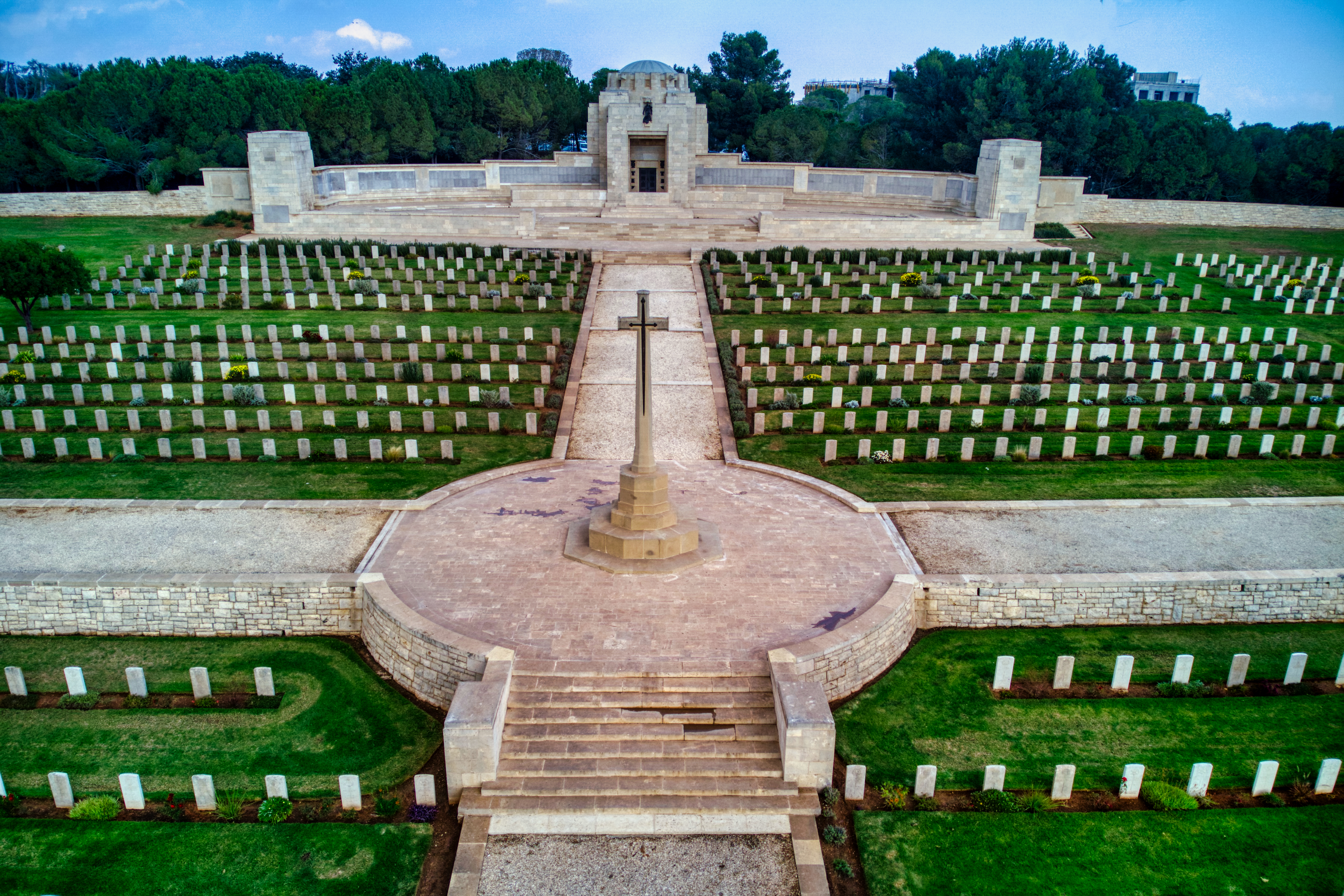
- Jerusalem War Cemetery
- Used for those deceased
- Location: near Jerusalem, Israel
- Designed by: John James Burnet

Burials by war
- World War I

The Jerusalem War Cemetery is a Commonwealth War Graves Commission cemetery in Jerusalem for fallen servicemen of the Commonwealth in the World War I in the Palestine campaign. The main cemetery is located on Mount Scopus next to the Hadassah hospital and the Hebrew University of Jerusalem campus, 4.5 km north of the Old City of Jerusalem.

== War Cemetery ==
The cemetery contains the graves of 2,515 Commonwealth service personnel (including 100 unidentified), a number of whom were removed from at least seven other cemeteries in the area where they could not be maintained. A small Jewish section is near Plot 'N'. Units from Australia, New Zealand, India, Egypt, South Africa and the British West Indies are also represented besides those of the United Kingdom. A small number of German and Turkish dead also are buried at the cemetery.

Notable burials include Major Philip Glazebrook, British Conservative member of parliament.

== Jerusalem Memorial ==
The cemetery also contains the Jerusalem Memorial to 3,300 Commonwealth service personnel who died on operations in the same war in Egypt and Palestine and have no known grave. Its architect was John James Burnet and the sculptor Gilbert Bayes. It was unveiled on 7 May 1927 by Lord Allenby, who had been British commander-in-chief in the Middle East. The memorial incorporates a chapel with a mosaic that was designed by Robert Anning Bell.

Notable persons interred in the cemetery include Ireland rugby union international, Captain William Victor Edwards and New Zealand rugby union international, Trooper Eric Harper.

== Photographs ==
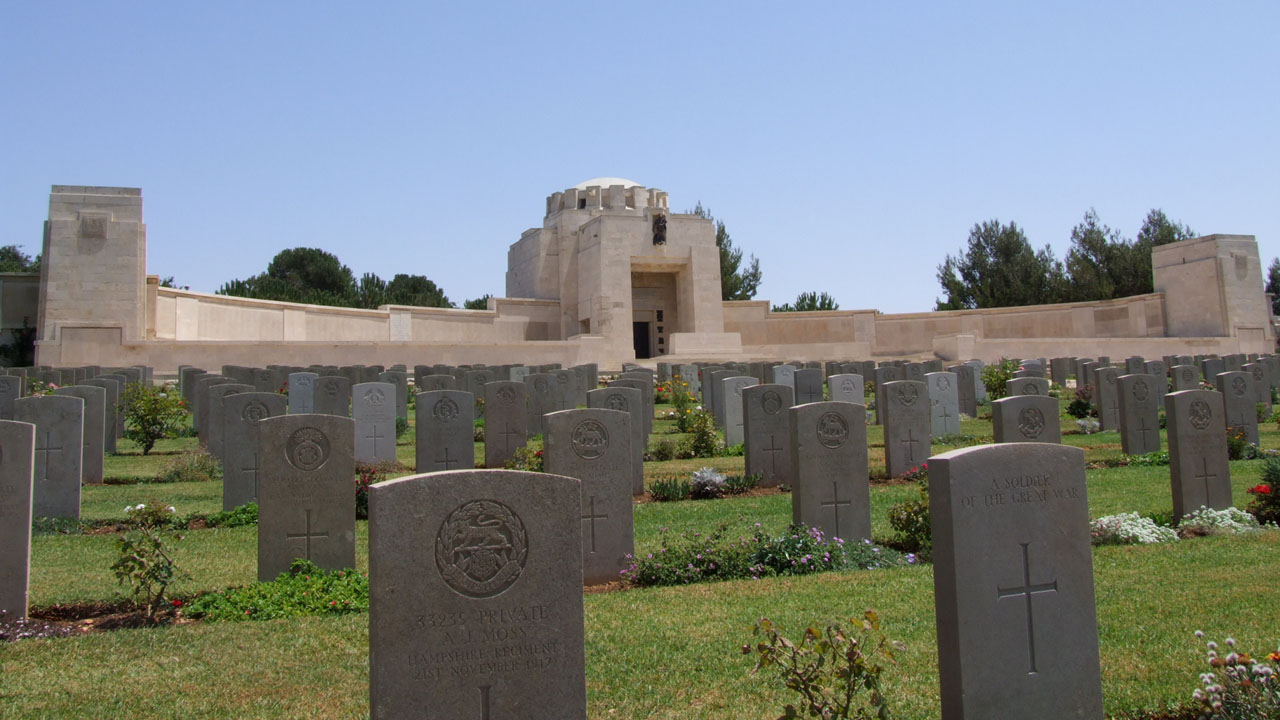

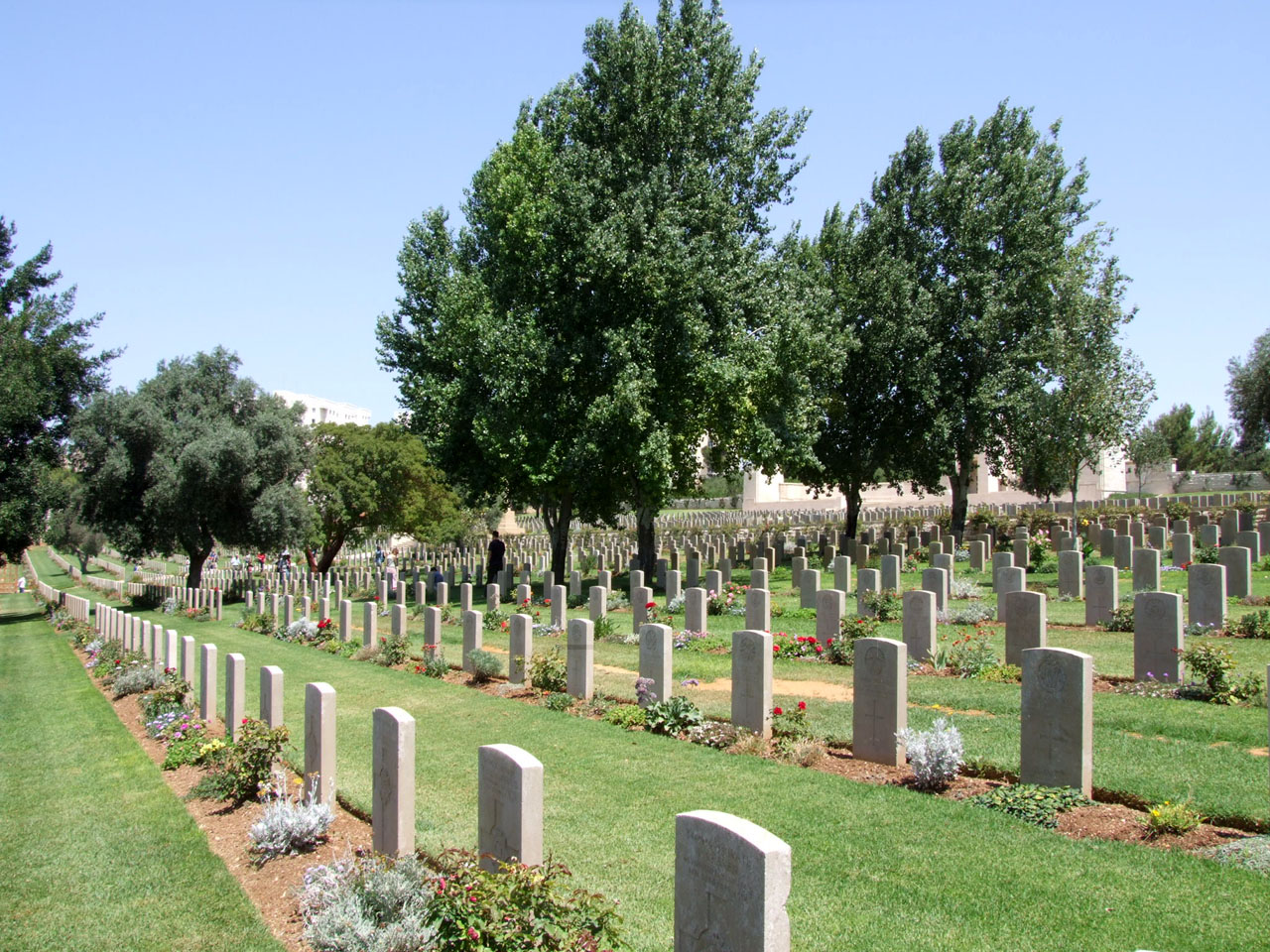

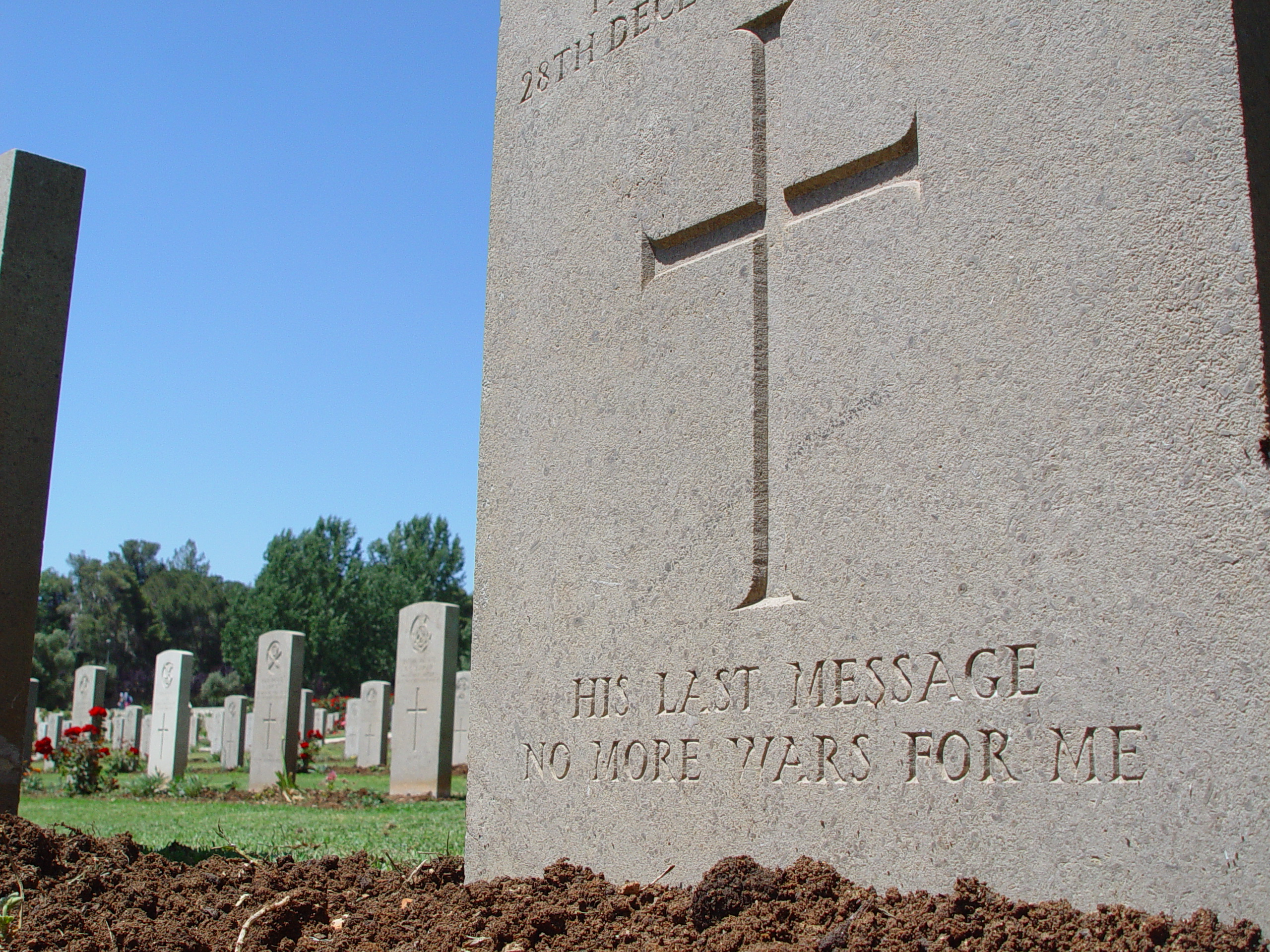

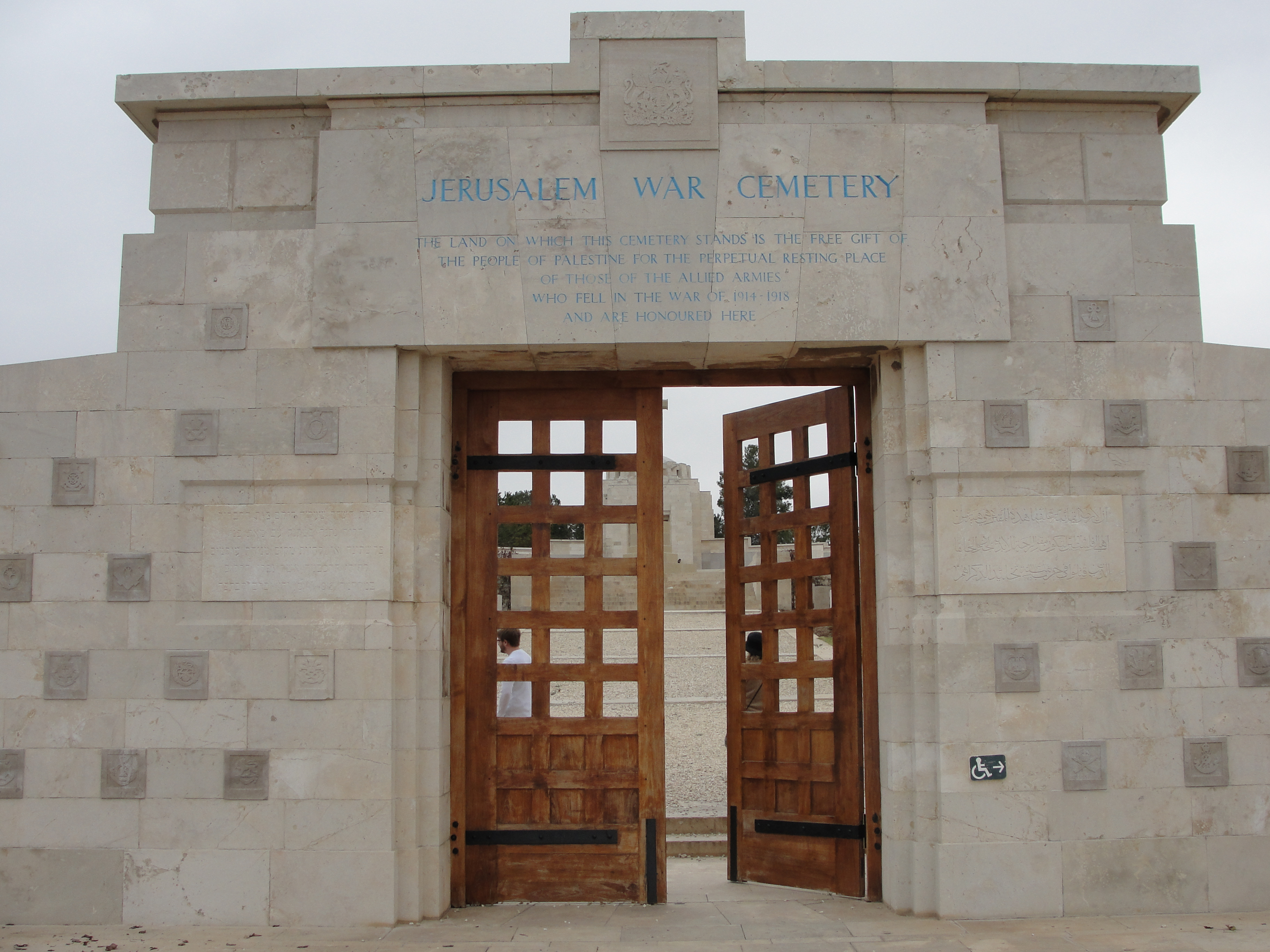
Entrance to the Jerusalem British Military Cemetery

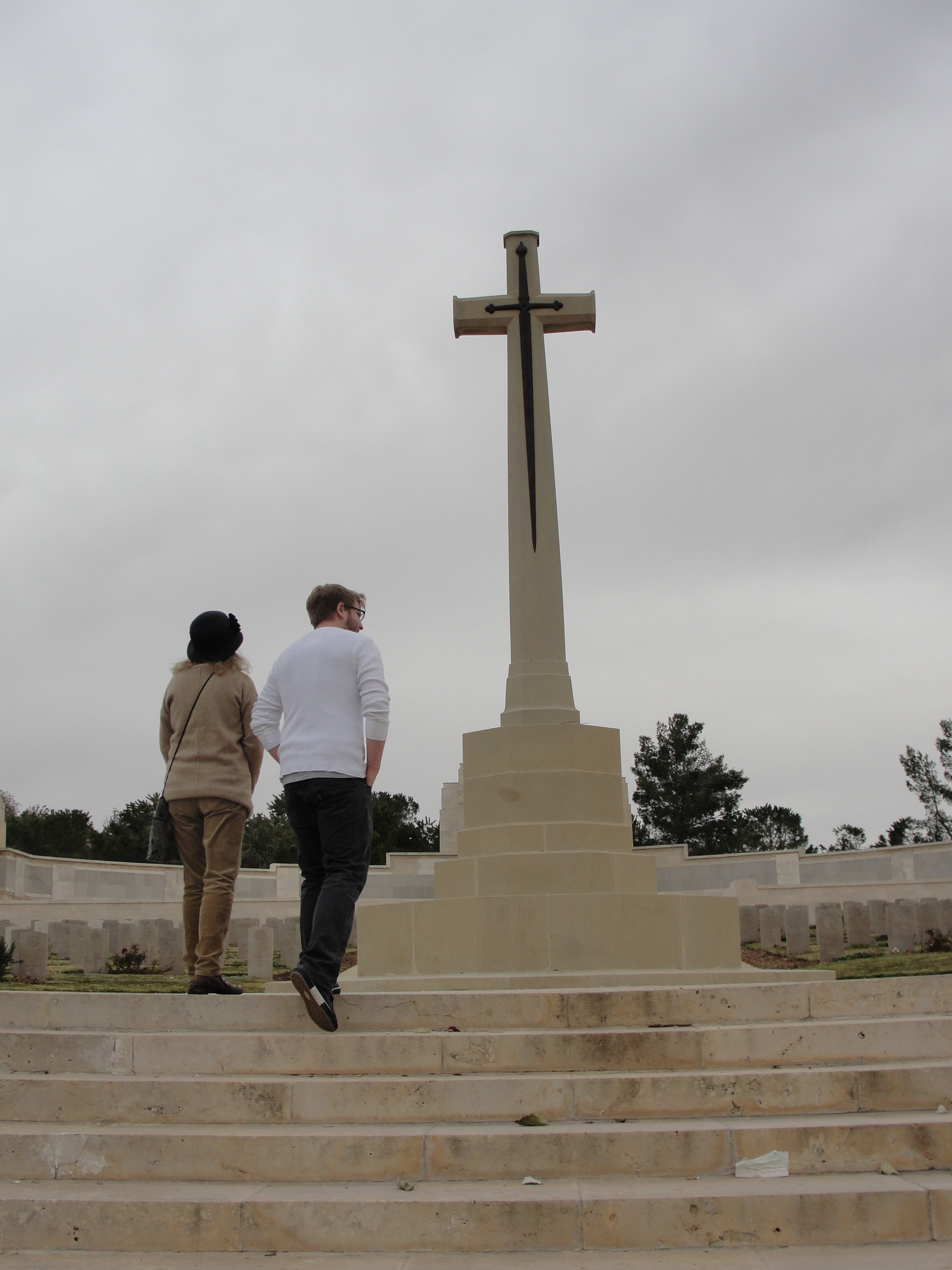
Cross in center of Cemetery

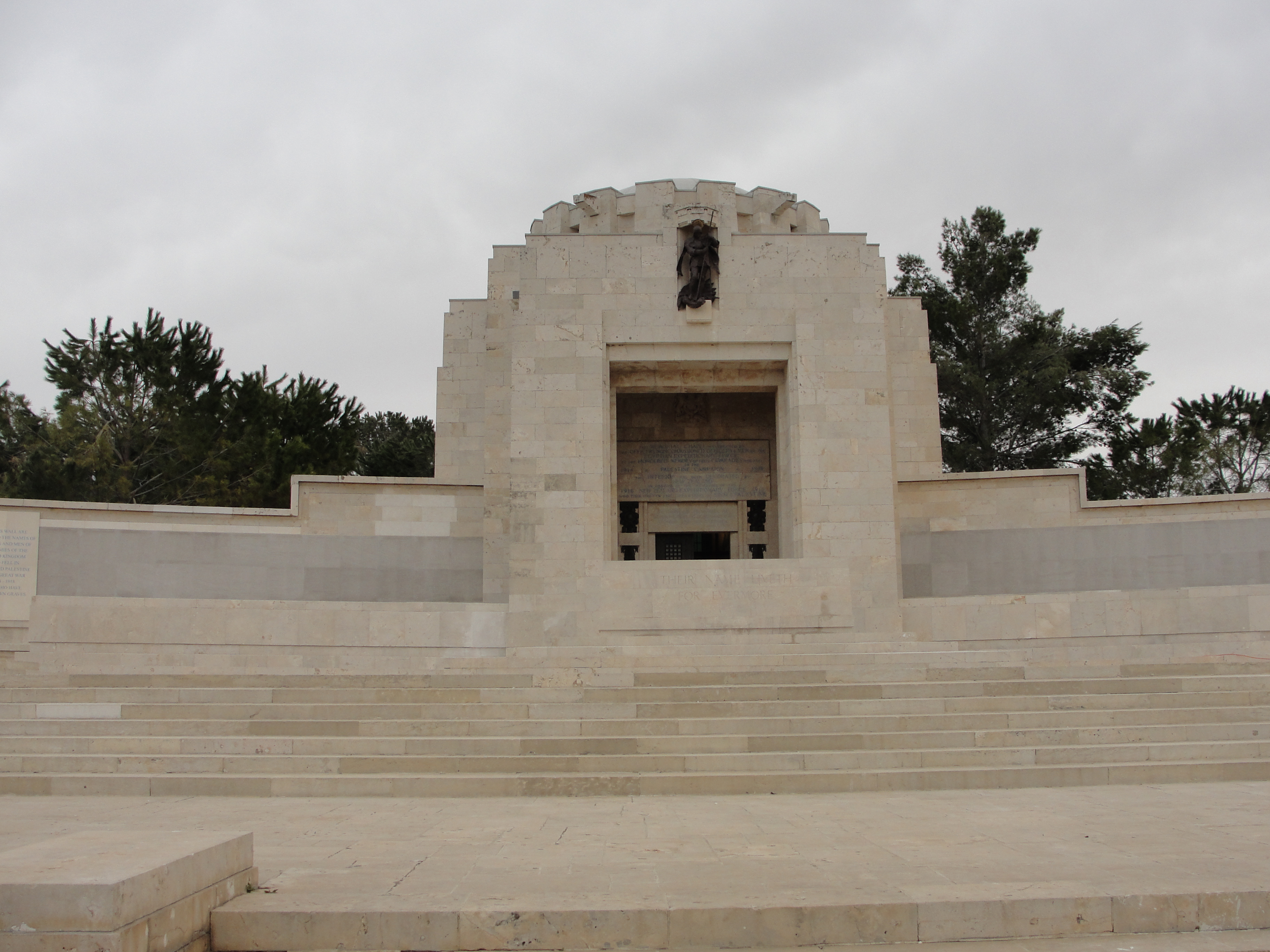
Chapel of Jerusalem British Military Cemetery

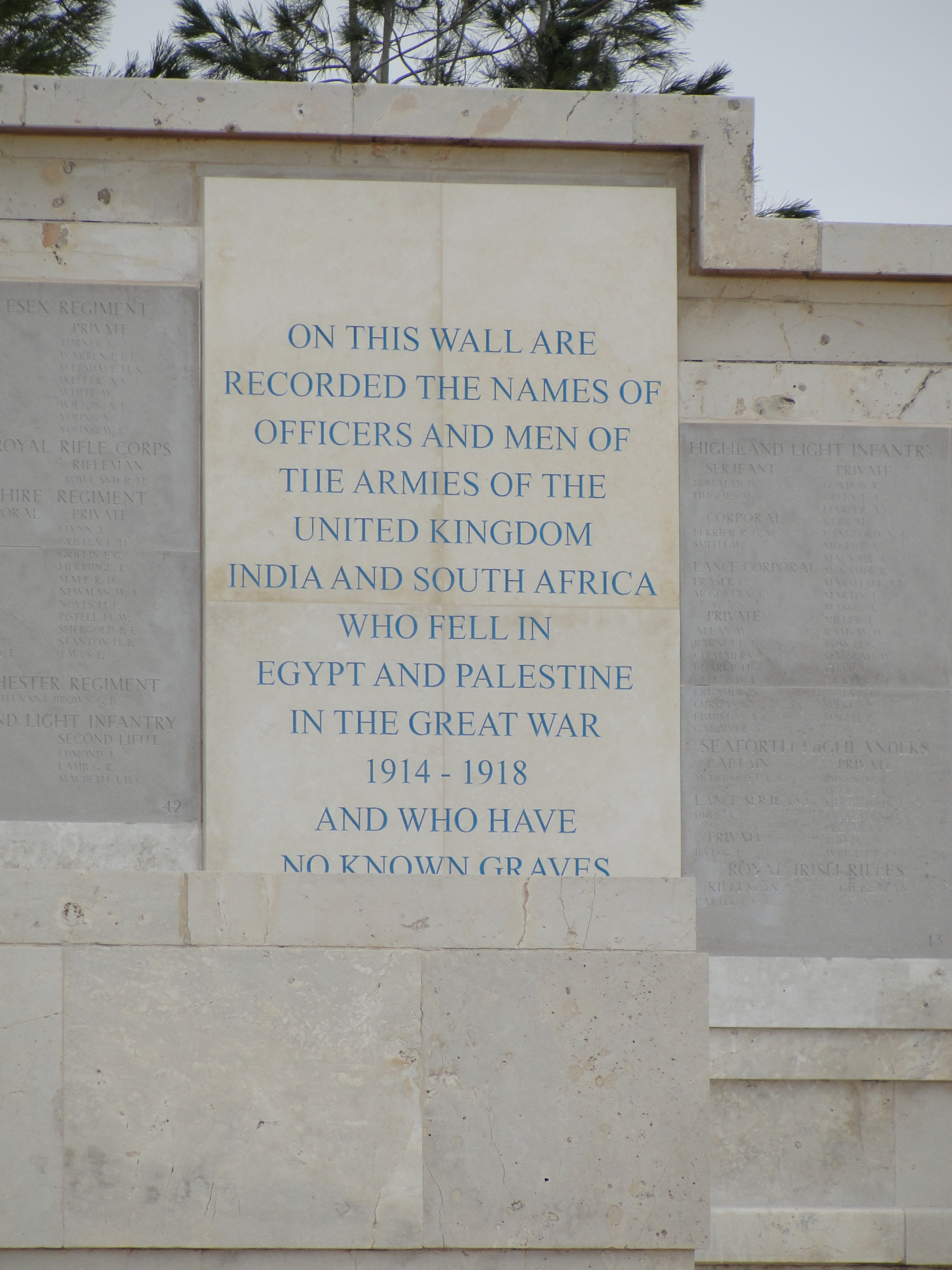
Dedication to Missing Soldiers

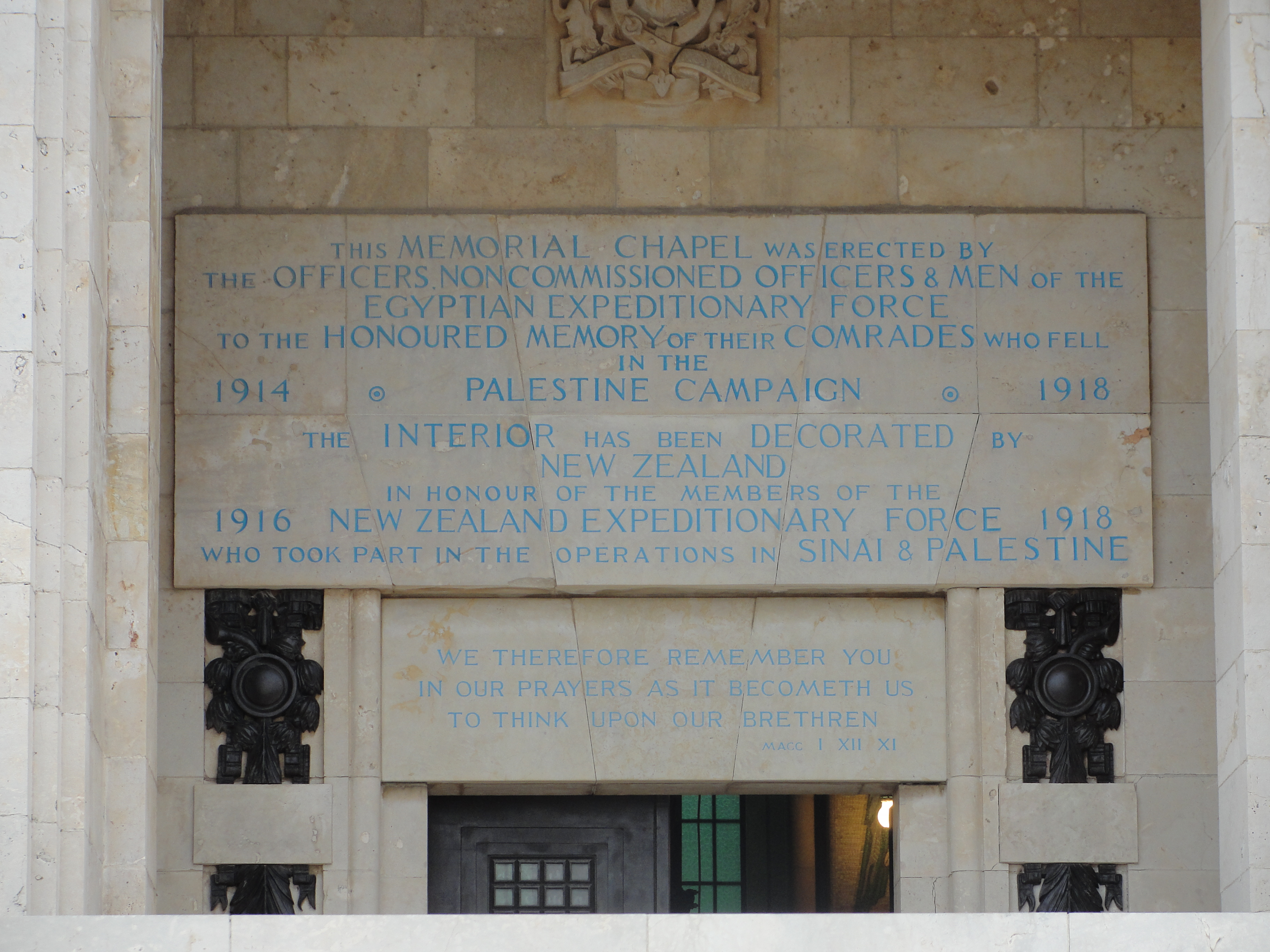
Entrance to chapel of Jerusalem British Military Cemetery

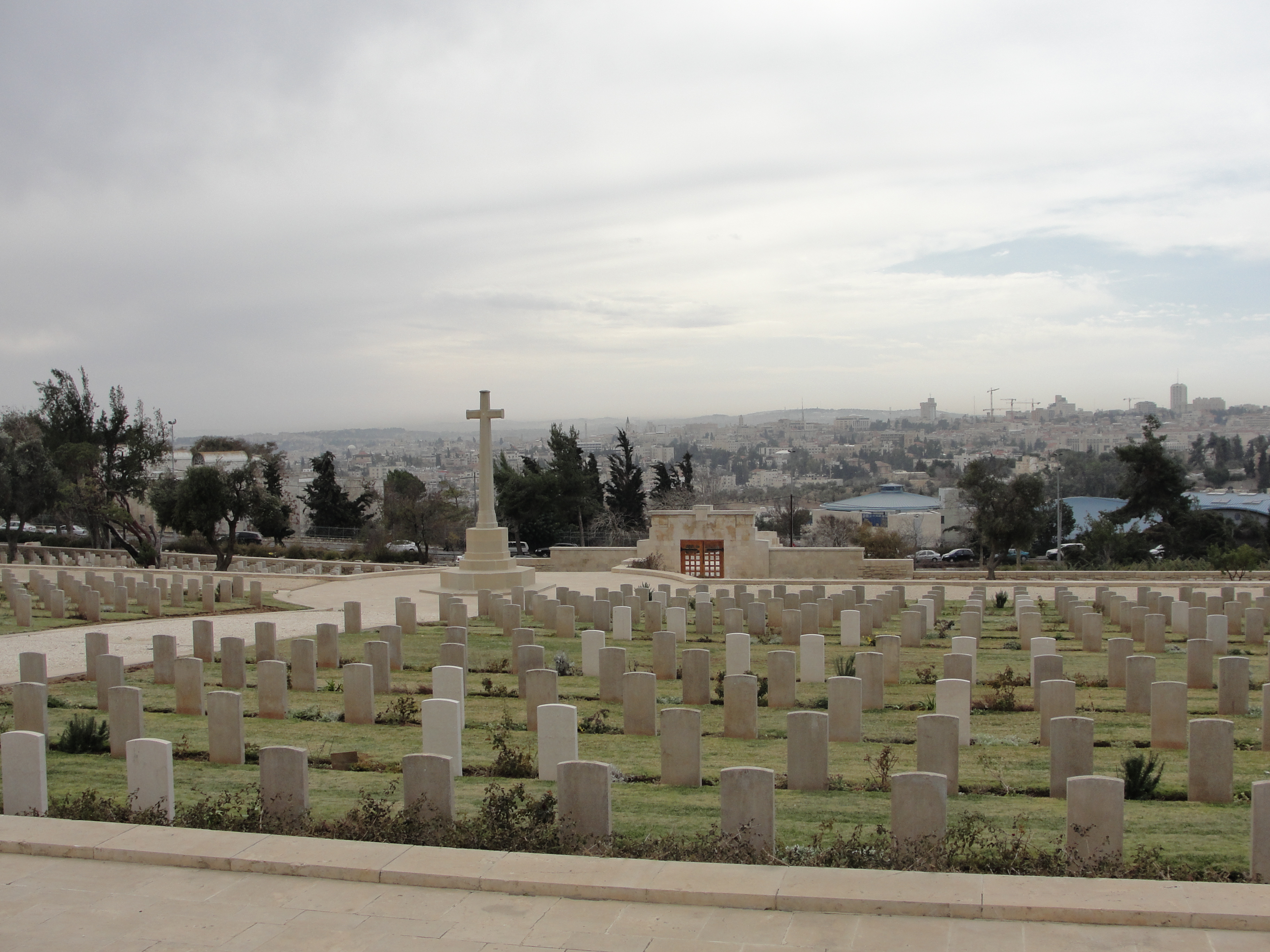
View of Old City of Jerusalem from cemetery

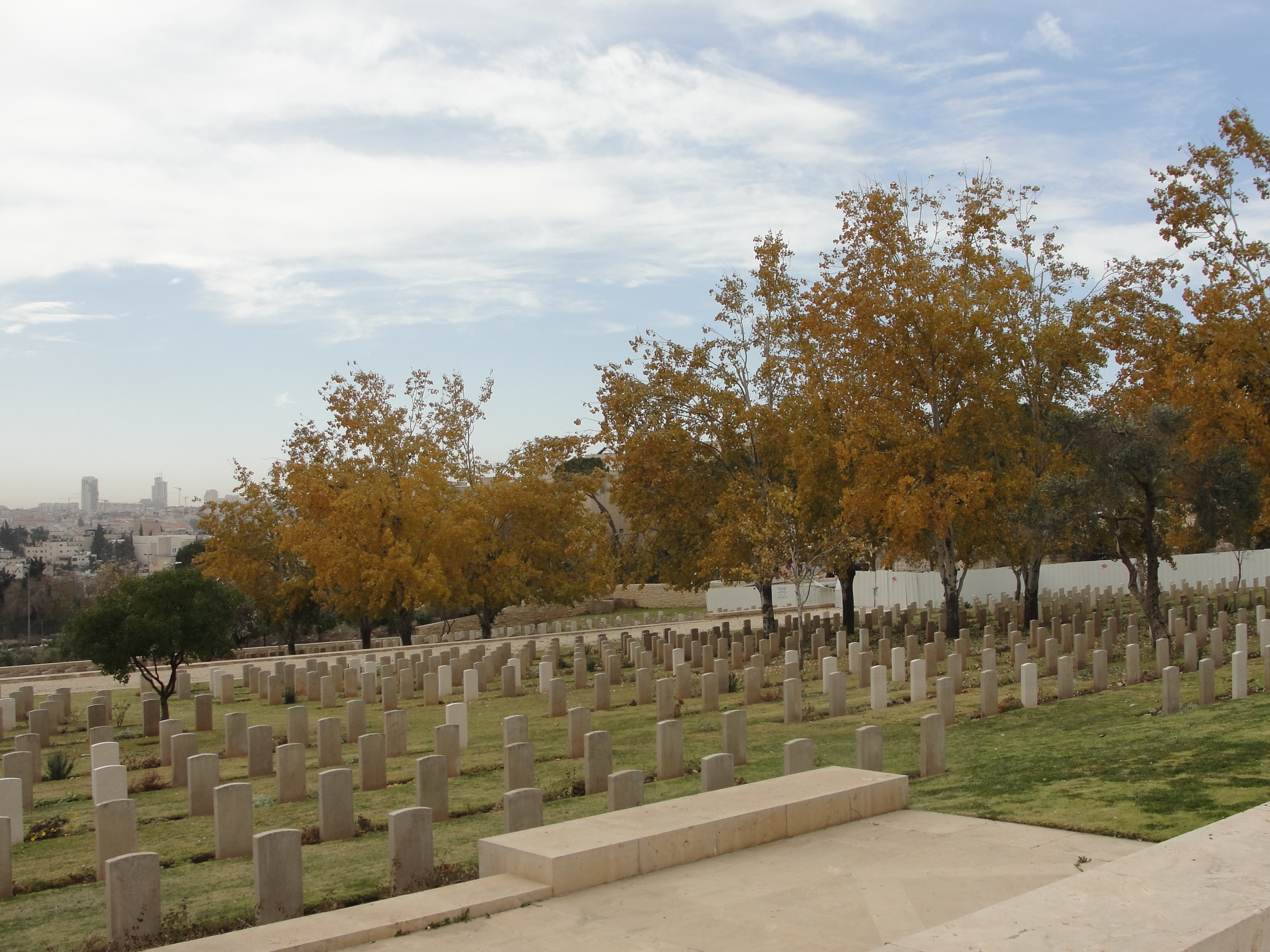
Western half of cemetery

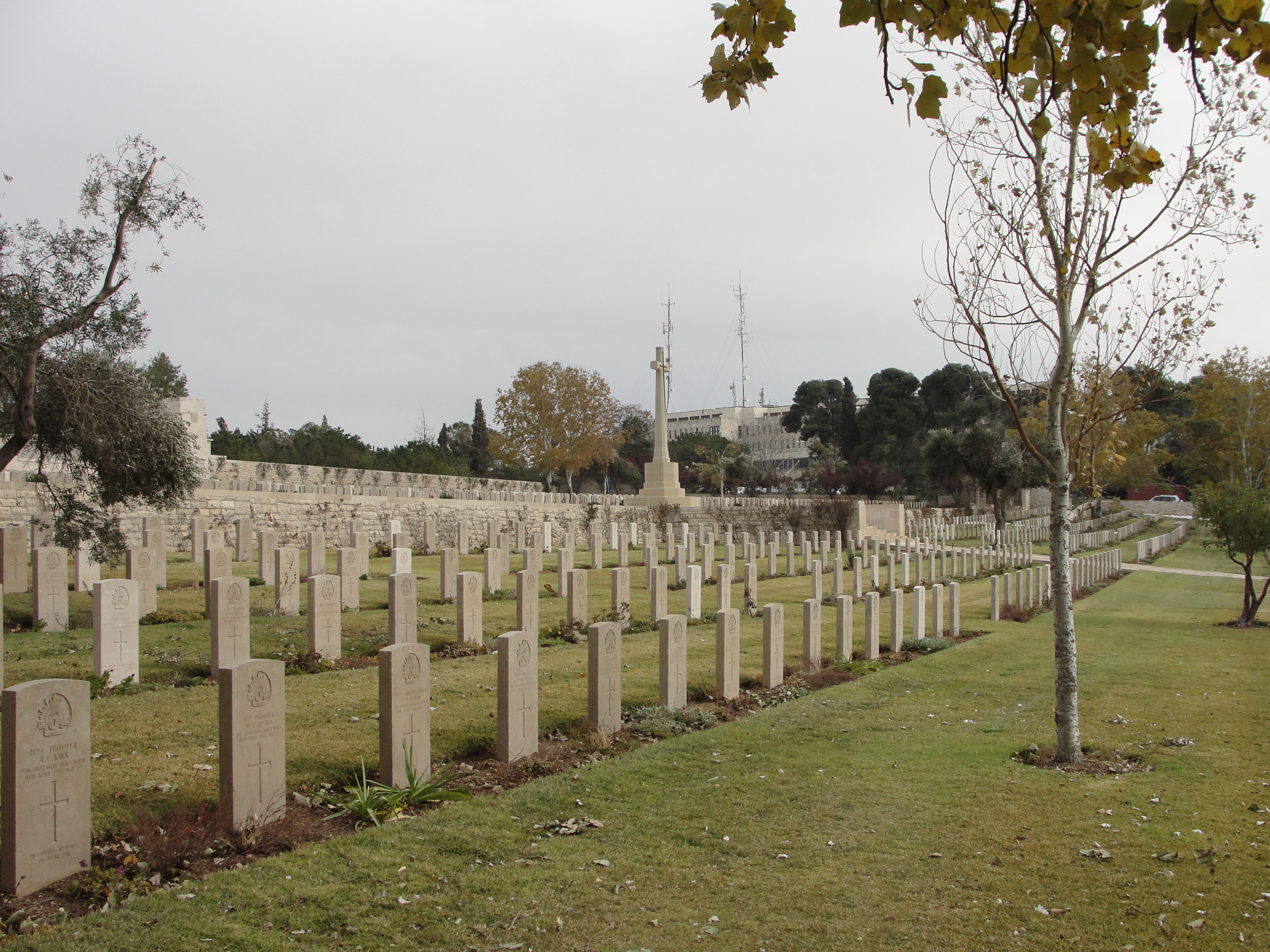
Looking East

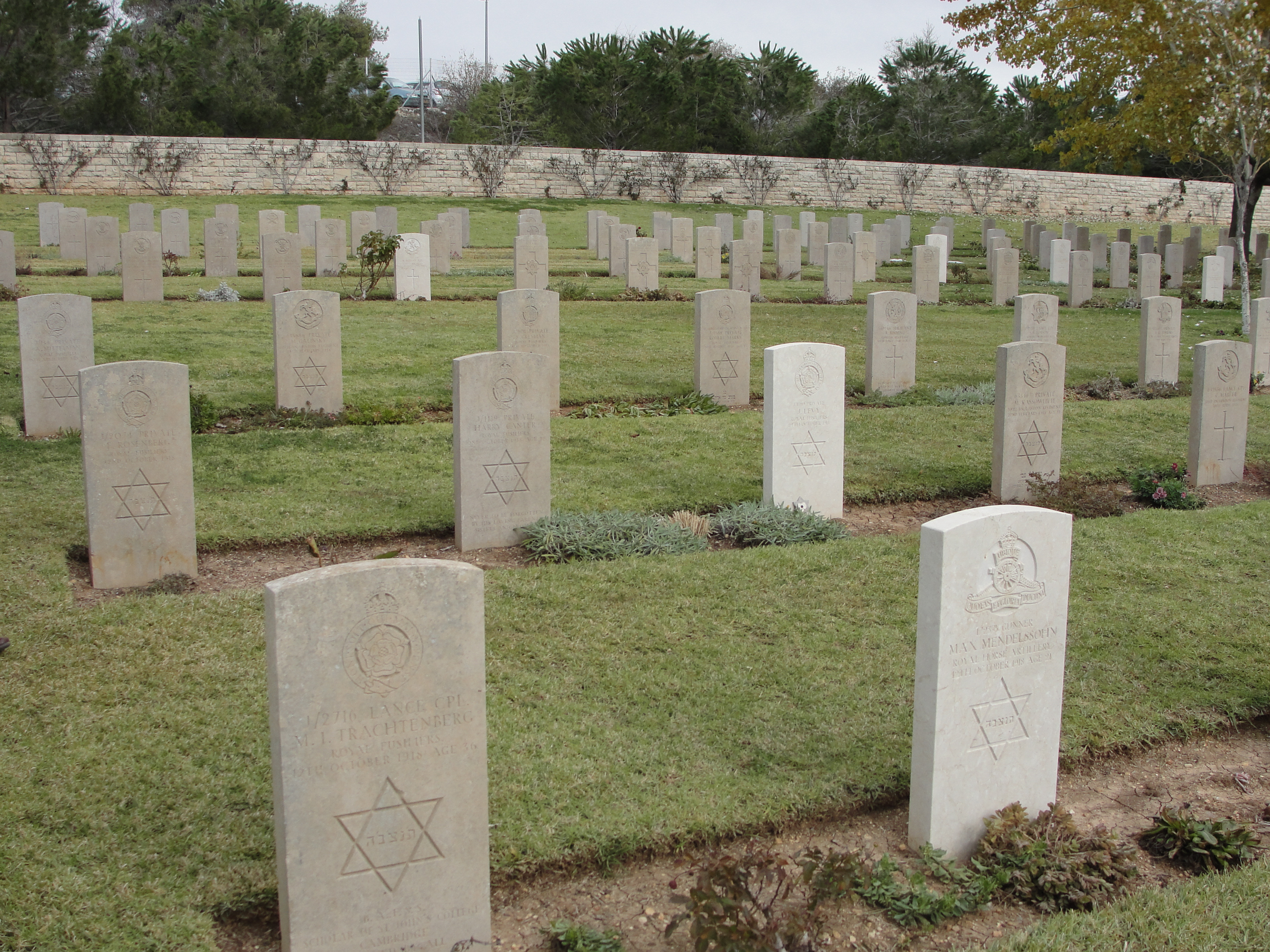
Graves of Jewish Commonwealth dead

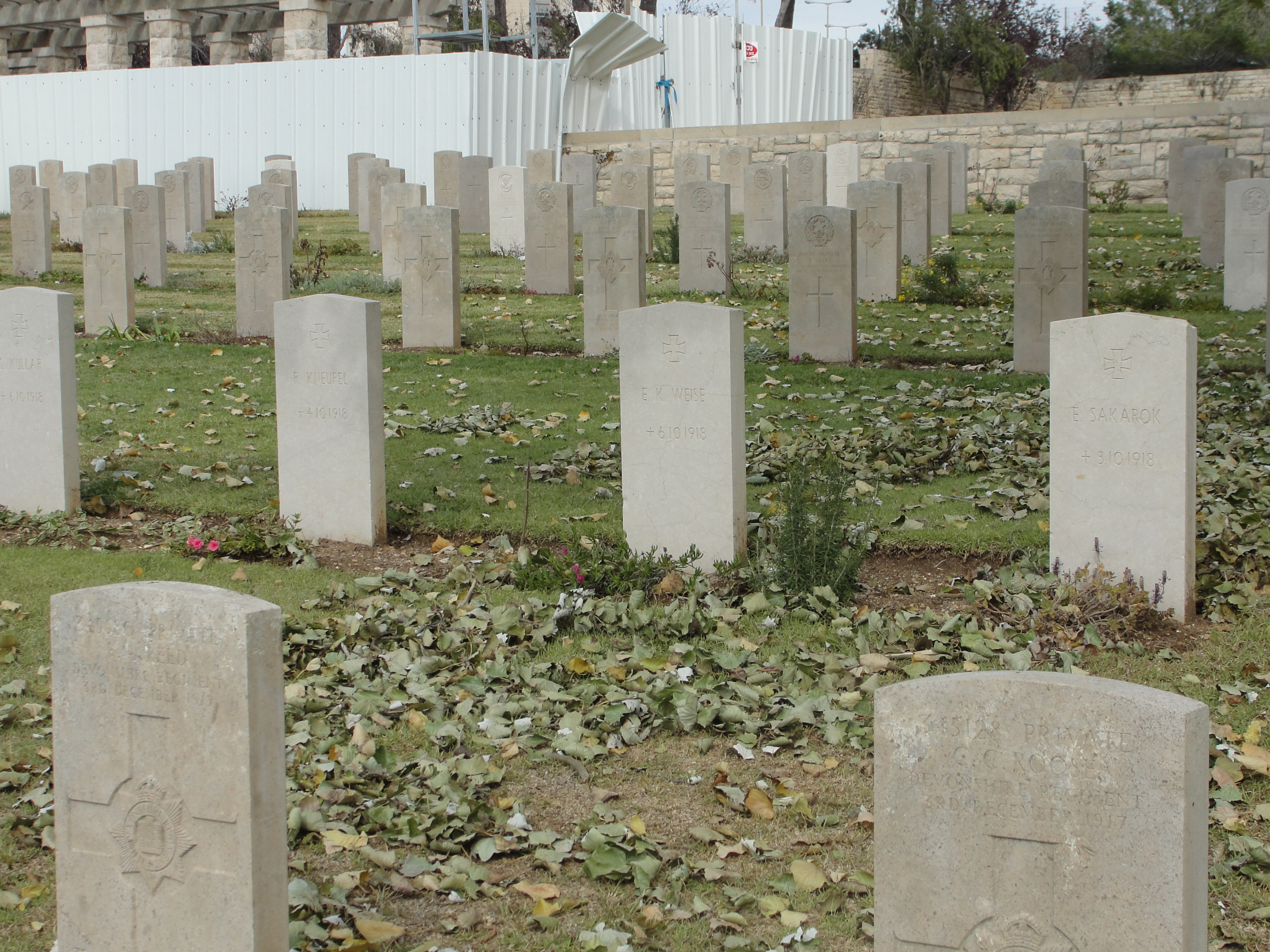
Graves of four German soldiers

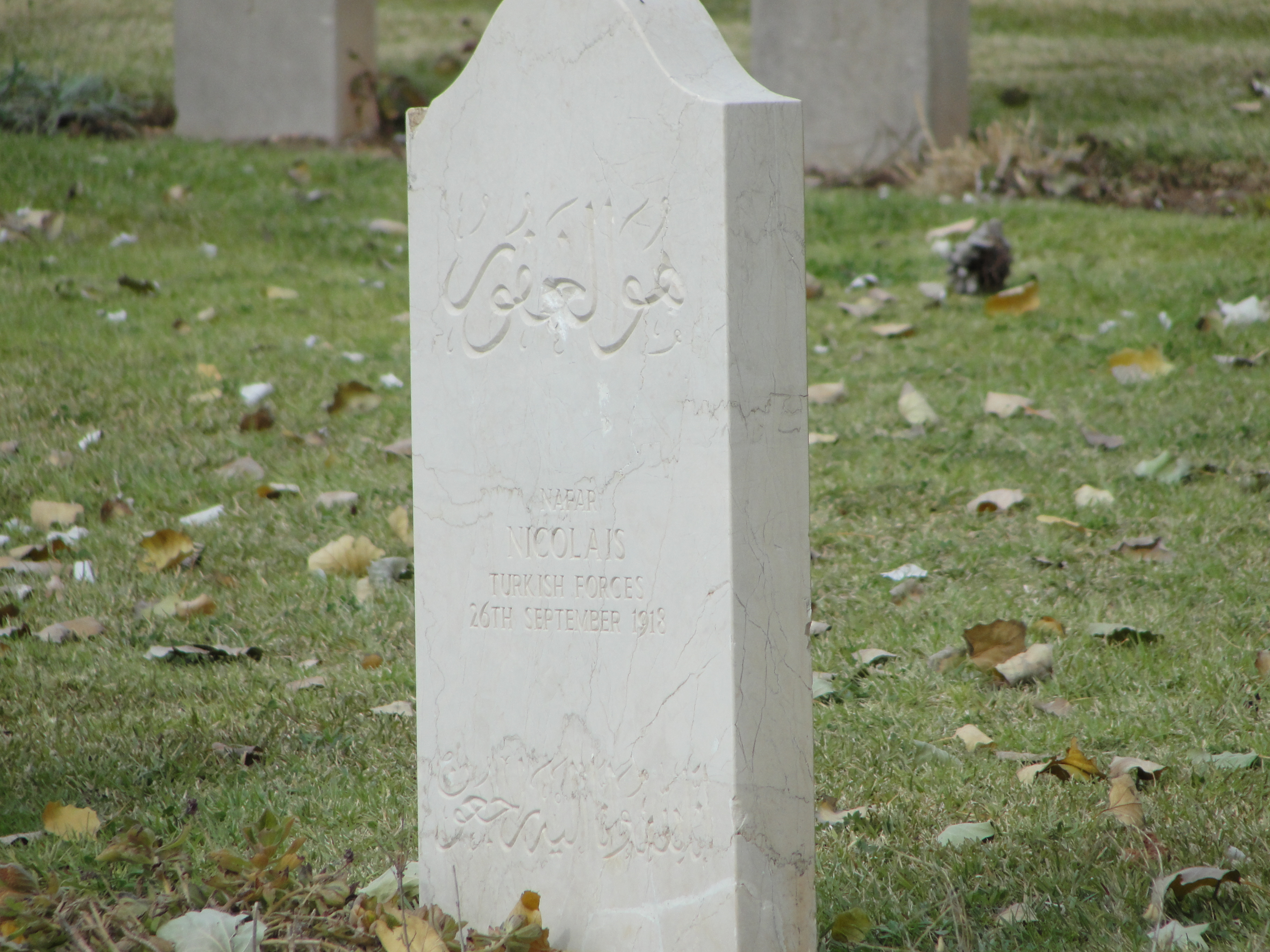
Grave of a Turkish soldier
