= Bowen-Jones baronets =

Extinct baronetcy in the Baronetage of the United Kingdom

- Escutcheon of the Bowen-Jones baronets of St Mary's Court
- Creation date: 1911
- Status: extinct
- Extinction date: 1925
- Motto: Recta montem ascendam, I shall ascend the mountain by the straight path
- Arms: Quarterly: 1st and 4th, Or, in base a mount Vert charged with a pale Argent, on a chief Gules two leopards’ faces Or (Jones); 2nd and 3rd: Argent, in chief two dragons’ heads erased Gules, in base a hemlock flower, stalked, leaved, and slipped Proper (Bowen).
- Crest: 1st, Upon a mount Vert, charged with a pale Argent a leopard’s face Or (Jones); 2nd, In front of a horse's head couped at the neck Argent, three torteaux each charged with a Bowen knot Or (Bowen).

The Bowen-Jones baronetcy, of St Mary's Court in the Borough of Shrewsbury, was a title in the Baronetage of the United Kingdom. It was created on 4 July 1911 for John Bowen-Jones, a deputy lieutenant and justice of the peace for Shropshire. Born John Jones, he assumed the additional surname of Bowen in 1911. The title became extinct on his death in 1925.

== Bowen-Jones baronets, of St Mary's Court (1911) ==
- Sir John Bowen Bowen-Jones, 1st Baronet (1840–1925)

Baronetage of the United Kingdom
Preceded by Haworth baronets	Bowen-Jones baronets of St Mary's Court; 4 July 1911	Succeeded by Leon baronets
