= 1944 Manchester Rusholme by-election =

UK parliamentary by-election

The 1944 Manchester Rusholme by-election was held on 8 July 1944. The by-election was held due to the death of the incumbent Conservative MP, Edmund Radford. It was won by the Conservative candidate Frederick Cundiff.

Manchester Rusholme by-election, 1944
| Party | Candidate | Votes | % | ±% |
|---|---|---|---|---|
| Conservative | Frederick Cundiff | 8,430 | 53.3 | −9.3 |
| Common Wealth | H.W. Blomerley | 6,670 | 42.1 | New |
| Independent Labour | C.J. Taylor | 734 | 4.6 | New |
| Majority | | 1,760 | 11.2 | −22.0 |
| Turnout | | 15,834 | 34.7 | −35.1 |
| Conservative hold | | Swing | | |
