= Goodhart baronets =

Baronetcy in the Baronetage of the United Kingdom

Escutcheon of the Goodhart baronets of Portland Place and Holtye

The Goodhart baronetcy, of Portland Place in St Marylebone and of Holtye in the County of Sussex, is a title in the Baronetage of the United Kingdom. It was created on 1 July 1911 for the prominent paediatrician James Goodhart. He was consulting physician to Guy's Hospital and the Evelina Children's Hospital and author of the textbook Diseases of Children.

== Goodhart baronets, of Portland Place and Holtye (1911) ==
- Sir James Frederic Goodhart, 1st Baronet (1845–1916)
- Sir Ernest Frederic Goodhart, 2nd Baronet (1880–1961)
- Sir John Gordon Goodhart, 3rd Baronet (1916–1979)
- Sir Robert Anthony Gordon Goodhart, 4th Baronet (born 1948)

The heir apparent is the present holder's son Martin Andrew Goodhart (born 1974).

Baronetage of the United Kingdom
Preceded by Everard baronets	Goodhart baronets of Portland Place and Holtye; 1 July 1911	Succeeded by Haworth baronets
