= Frederick Cundiff =

British soldier, politician and businessman

Frederick William Cundiff (17 November 1895 – 7 August 1982) was a British soldier, politician and businessman.

He was the son of Sir William Cundiff, a prominent businessman and politician in Manchester who held the office of Lord Mayor in 1922–23.

During the First World War Cundiff served in the Royal Field Artillery (RFA), later transferring to the Royal Flying Corps. Following the war, he joined the part-time reserve Territorial Army, returning to the RFA, which became part of the Royal Regiment of Artillery (RA) in 1924. He was promoted to the rank of major later in 1924. He retired from the TA in 1930.

With the outbreak of the Second World War Cundiff received a commission as a lieutenant in the Royal Navy Volunteer Reserve.

In June 1944, Edmund Ashworth Radford, the member of parliament for Manchester Rusholme, died. Cundiff was selected to contest the resulting byelection for the Conservative Party. Under a wartime political pact, the parties forming the coalition government agreed not to contest vacancies, although he was opposed by a Common Wealth Party and an independent candidate. The poll was held on 8 July, and Cundiff was elected with a majority of 1,760 votes over the Common Wealth candidate. He was to remain as Rusholme's member of parliament for less than a year, as he was defeated by Lester Hutchinson of the Labour Party when a general election was held in 1945 by a margin of 11 votes.

The Representation of the People Act 1948 reorganised constituencies throughout Great Britain, and Cundiff was chosen by the Conservatives to contest the Manchester Withington Borough Constituency which was formed from parts of the previous Rusholme and Withington seats. The new constituency was first contested at the 1950 general election, and he won the seat comfortably with a majority of over 8,500 votes over his Labour challenger. When a further general election was called in the following year, Cundiff chose to retire from the Commons.

After parliament, Cundiff took up other directorships in companies, including serving as chairman of Threlfalls Brewery.

Parliament of the United Kingdom
Preceded by Edmund Ashworth Radford	Member of Parliament for Manchester Rusholme; 1944 – 1945	Succeeded by Lester Hutchinson
Preceded by Edward Fleming	Member of Parliament for Manchester Withington; 1950 – 1951	Succeeded by Sir Robert Cary, Bt
