= Arthur Haworth =

British politician and businessman

Coat of arms of Arthur Haworth
| Crest Issuant out of grass Proper a stag’s head Gules armed and collared with a chain Or. Escutcheon Azure on a bend between two stags' heads couped Or as many garbs Gules. |

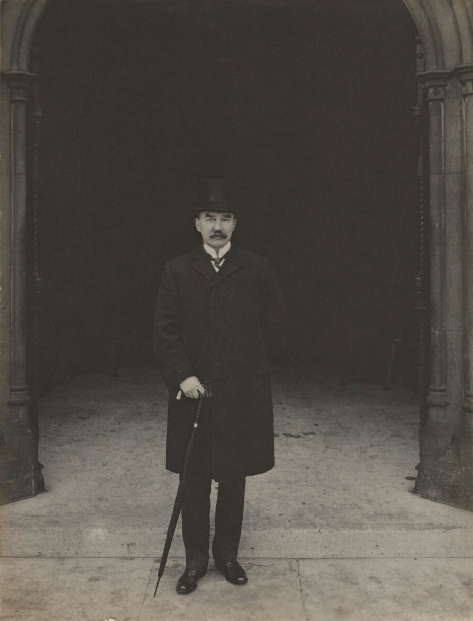
Arthur Haworth

Sir Arthur Adlington Haworth, 1st Baronet (22 August 1865 – 31 August 1944), was a British businessman and Liberal politician.

He was born in Eccles, Lancashire, and was the eldest son of Abraham Haworth of Altrincham. He was educated at Rugby School before going into business in Manchester. He became a senior partner in James Dilworth and Son, yarn merchants. In 1902 he was appointed a director of the Manchester Royal Exchange, and in 1909 chairman of the board.

He held a number of other positions, including Chairman of the Governors of Manchester Grammar School, treasurer of Mansfield College, Oxford and chairman of the Congregational Union of England and Wales. He also served as a major in the 1st Volunteer Battalion, The Cheshire Regiment.

At the 1906 general election he was elected as Liberal Member of Parliament for Manchester South, and was created a baronet, of Dunham Massey in the County of Chester, in 1911. In February 1912 he was appointed a Junior Lord of the Treasury by Prime Minister H. H. Asquith. However, when he sought re-election to Parliament following this appointment he was defeated by the Unionist candidate Philip Glazebrook.

He was a Liberal candidate at the next general election in 1918 in the Manchester Exchange constituency but did not receive the coupon and failed to be elected.

Haworth married Lily Rigby in 1891 and they had three children.

Haworth died at his home "Normanby", Altrincham, in August 1944, aged 79.

Parliament of the United Kingdom
| Preceded by William Wellesley Peel | Member of Parliament for Manchester South; 1906 – 1912 | Succeeded by Philip Kirkland Glazebrook |
Baronetage of the United Kingdom
| New creation | Baronet (of Dunham Massey); 1911–1944 | Succeeded by Arthur Geoffrey Haworth |
