= James Goodhart =

English physician (1845–1916)

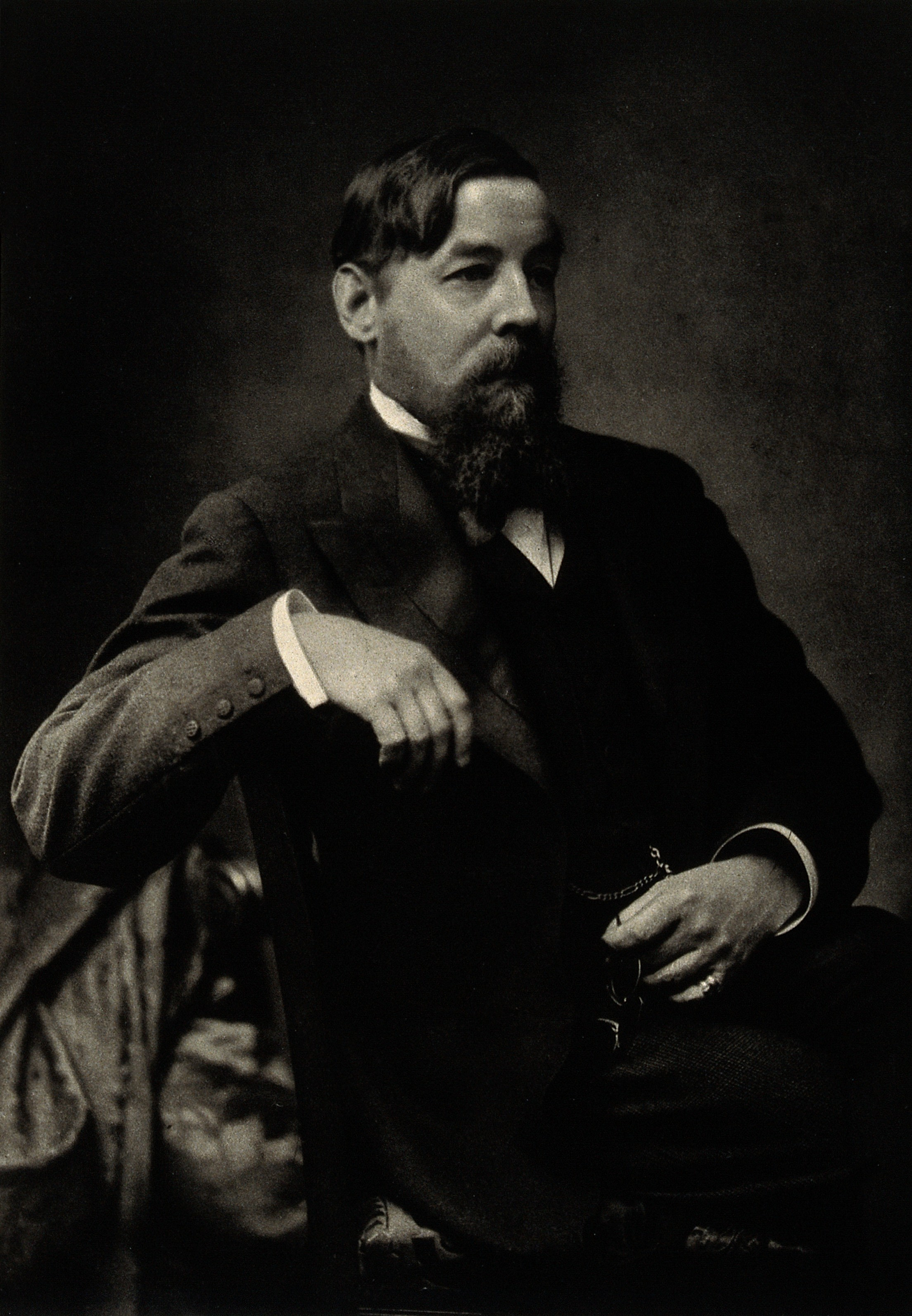
Portrait. Credit:Wellcome Collection

Sir James Frederic Goodhart, 1st Baronet (24 October 1845 – 28 May 1916) was an English physician and paediatrician. His work extended into various medical fields, including morbid pathology and paediatrics. He held positions in a number of London hospitals and institutions, including Guy's Hospital and the Evelina Hospital for Sick Children. After his retirement, he set up in private practice in Portland Place, London. In 1911, Goodhart was awarded the baronetcy of Portland Place and Hoylte.

== Biography ==
He was the son of Camden physician Alfred Harrington Goodhart and was educated at Epsom Medical College in Epsom, Surrey. Afterwards, he entered Guy's Hospital in 1864 to qualify in Medicine. In 1868 he took the diplomas MRCP and LRCP. In 1871 he gained an MB, CM with highest honours from Aberdeen University, followed in 1873 by a Doctor of Medicine (MD); in 1899 he received an Honorary Doctor of Laws (LL.D). At Guy's Hospital he was appointed Surgical Registrar in 1872, and Medical Registrar in 1874. For six years from 1871 he worked as an assistant curator at the museum of the Royal College of Surgeons.

He was appointed an assistant physician at Guy's Hospital in 1877, and was a demonstrator in morbid pathology, working in the post-mortem room for thirteen years. In 1886 he was appointed hospital physician, a post he held until his retirement in 1898. During this time he was also the curator of the Guy's museum. His interest in childhood diseases led to appointments at the Evelina Hospital for Sick Children, first as House Surgeon when it opened in 1869, then as Physician to Out-patients in 1875 and Full Physician from 1881 to 1888. The experiences he gained at the Evelina led him to write a successful textbook, The Student's Guide to the Diseases of Children, which was first published in 1885 and continued to an eleventh edition in 1921. From the sixth edition Goodhart was assisted by his one-time registrar, Dr. George Frederic Still.

In 1880 he was made a Fellow of the Royal College of Physicians, where he was an Examiner (1889–92), a Councillor (1901–03) and a Censor (1907), and where in 1885 he gave the Bradshaw Lecture on Morbid Arterial Tension. In 1891 he delivered the Harveian Lectures before the Harveian Society on Common Neuroses, or the Neurotic Element in Disease and its Rational Treatment.

After his retirement from Guy's he set up in private practice in Portland Place, London until his death in 1916. In 1912 he gave the Harveian Oration at the Royal College of Physicians on the Passing of Morbid Anatomy.

In the 1911 Coronation Honours of King George V he was made a baronet (of Portland Place in St Marylebone and Holtye in the County of Sussex). On his death he was succeeded in the baronetcy by his elder son Sir Ernest Frederic Goodhart, 2nd Baronet. He had married Emma, the daughter of William Bennett.

== See also ==
- List of honorary medical staff at King Edward VII's Hospital for Officers

== Works ==
- Goodhart, J.F. (1871), On Artificial Tuberculosis and its Relation to Cellular Pathology and the growth of Tumours, Edinburgh: Oliver and Boyd.
- Goodhart, J.F. (1885), The Student's Guide to Diseases of Children, London: J. & A. Churchill.
- Goodhart, J.F. (1892), On Common Neuroses, or, The Neurotic element in Disease and its Rational Treatment: Three Lectures delivered before the Harveian Society of London, November-December, 1891, London: H.K. Lewis.
- Goodhart, J.F. (1895), An Address on Some of the Limitations of Medicine: Delivered at the Opening Meeting of the Session of the Medico-Chirurgical Society of Exeter, on Friday, October 18, 1895, London: John Bale & Sons.
- Goodhart, J.F. (ed. G.F. Still) (1899), Diseases of Children: A Short Introduction to their Study (Sixth Edition), London: J. & A. Churchill.
- Goodhart, J.F. (1912), The Passing of Morbid Anatomy: The Harveian Oration for 1912 delivered at the Royal College of Physicians on St. Luke's Day, October 18, 1912, London: John Murray.
- Goodhart, J.F. (ed. G.F. Still) (1921), The Diseases of Children (Eleventh Edition), London: J. & A. Churchill.

Baronetage of the United Kingdom
New creation	Baronet (of Portland Place and Holtye); 1911–1916	Succeeded by Ernest Goodhart
