= Philip Glazebrook =

British politician

Philip Kirkland Glazebrook DSO
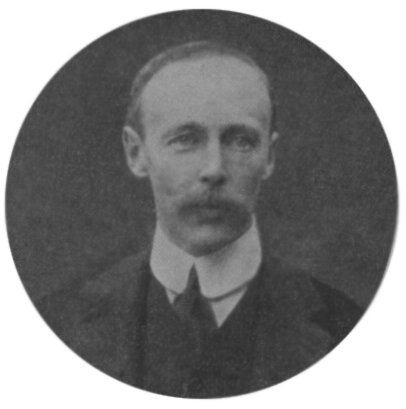
- Glazebrook in a photograph published on 9 March 1912 in The Illustrated London News following his election
- Born: 24 December 1880; Holmes Chapel, Cheshire, United Kingdom
- Died: 7 March 1918 (aged 37); Bireh
- Burial place: Jerusalem British War Cemetery
- Military career
- Allegiance: United Kingdom
- Branch: British Army
- Service years: 1901–1918
- Rank: Major
- Units: Cheshire Yeomanry, King's Shropshire Light Infantry
- Conflicts: World War I
- Awards: Distinguished Service Order
- Other work: MP for Manchester South

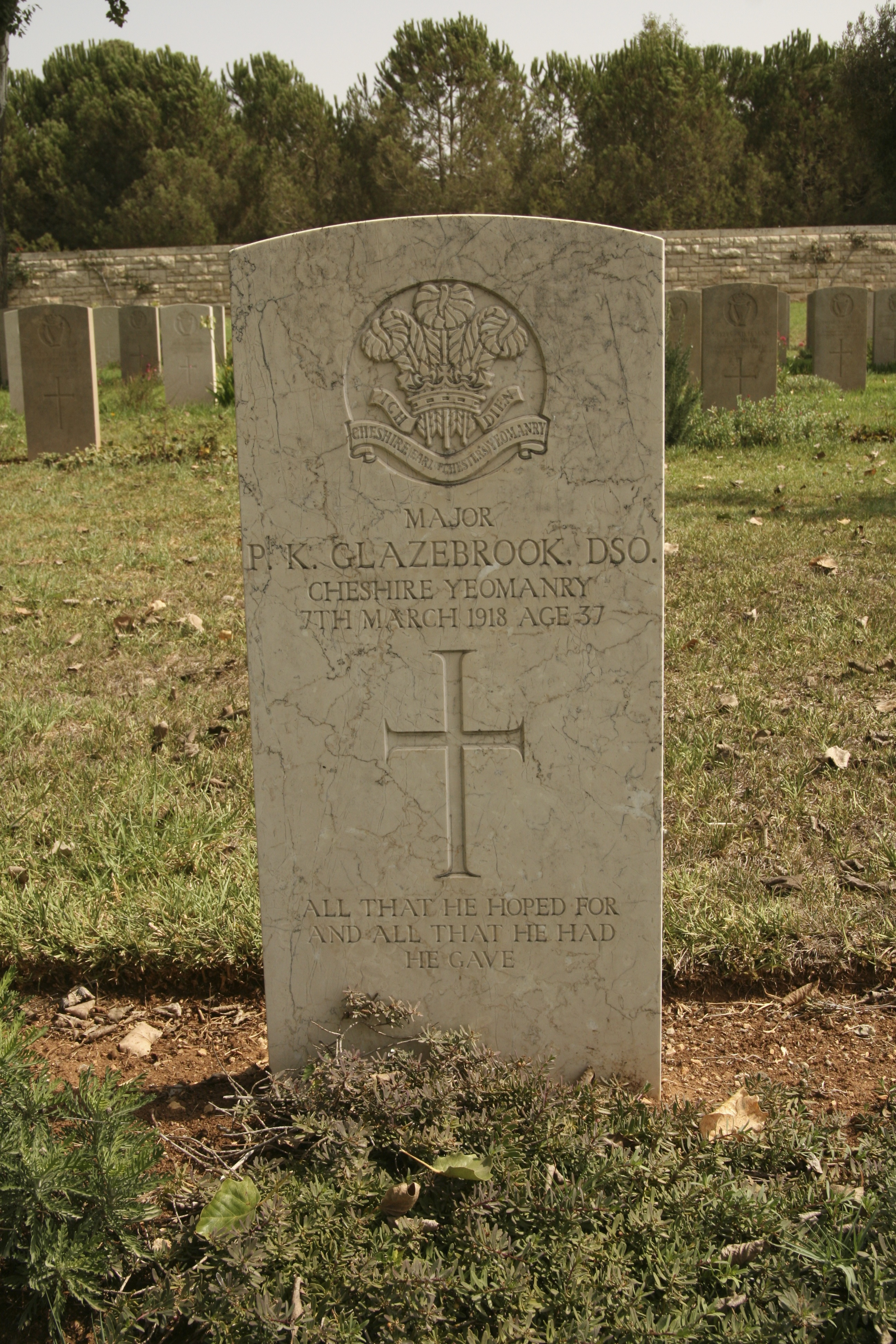
Gravesite of Philip Glazebrook at the Jerusalem British War Cemetery

Major Philip Kirkland Glazebrook, DSO (24 December 1880 – 7 March 1918) was a British businessman and Conservative politician. He was killed in action in the First World War.

He was the son of John Knowles Glazebrook and Cecilia Anne Esther (née Watson) of Twemlow Hall, Holmes Chapel, Cheshire, and was educated at Eton College and New College, Oxford. He was a partner in the firm of Spurrier and Glazebrook Limited, oil merchants, Manchester. He held the rank of captain in the Cheshire Yeomanry. He was unmarried.

In December 1910 he was chosen as Conservative candidate to contest the constituency of Manchester South at the general election. However, due to an error by his election agent, he arrived at Manchester Town Hall six minutes after nominations had closed, resulting in the unopposed election of the sitting Liberal MP, Arthur Haworth.

In February 1912 Haworth was appointed as a Junior Lord of the Treasury, requiring him to seek re-election in a by-election. Glazebrook was the Conservative candidate, and a vigorous campaign was held, with the main issues being woman suffrage, Home Rule and National Insurance. Glazebrook managed to unseat Haworth, winning the seat by 579 votes.

With the outbreak of war in 1914, the Cheshire Yeomanry were mobilised, and Glazebrook served in Egypt and Palestine. He advanced to the rank of major, and was awarded the Distinguished Service Order in February 1918. The citation read:

For conspicuous gallantry and devotion to duty. When, by the capture of a neighbouring height, the enemy had rendered the position of two companies most precarious because they now came under concentrated machine-gun fire from their left rear, he immediately went to the most threatened spot, and by his courageous bearing and great coolness was responsible for the safe withdrawal of these companies. The unfailing energy and resolution shown by this officer were most noticeable.

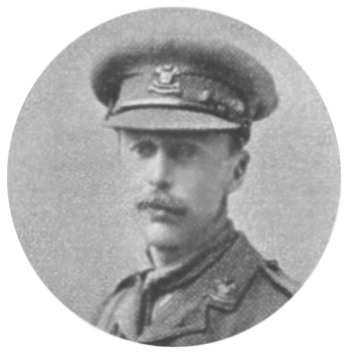
Glazebrook from the Roll of Honour published in The Illustrated London News on 20 April 1918

In March 1917 the Cheshire Yeomanry were merged with the Shropshire Yeomanry to form an infantry unit: the 10th (Shropshire and Cheshire Yeomanry) Battalion, The King's (Shropshire Light Infantry). Major Glazebrook was killed in action on 7 March 1918 at Bireh, near Jerusalem and is buried in the Jerusalem British War Cemetery. There is a memorial to him at St Luke's Church, Goostrey. Glazebrook is commemorated on Panel 8 of the Parliamentary War Memorial in Westminster Hall, one of 22 MPs that died during World War I to be named on that memorial. Glazebrook is one of 19 MPs who fell in the war who are commemorated by heraldic shields in the Commons Chamber. A further act of commemoration came with the unveiling in 1932 of a manuscript-style illuminated book of remembrance for the House of Commons, which includes a short biographical account of the life and death of Glazebrook.

Parliament of the United Kingdom
Preceded by Arthur Haworth	Member of Parliament for Manchester South; 1912–1918	Succeeded by Robert Burdon Stoker
