= Boyd Merriman, 1st Baron Merriman =

British Conservative politician and judge

The Right Honourable The Lord Merriman GCVO OBE PC
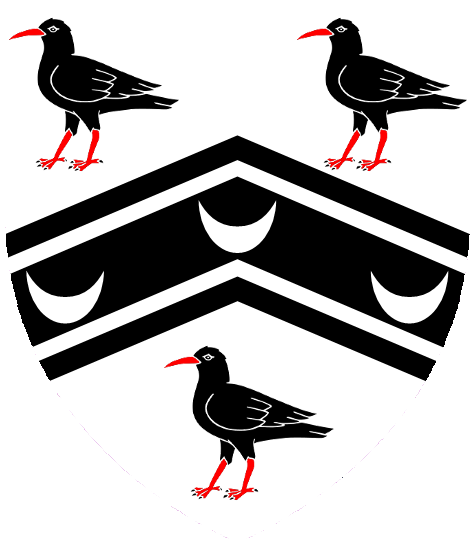

President of the Probate, Divorce and Admiralty Division
- In office 2 October 1933 – 18 January 1962
- Preceded by: The Lord Merrivale
- Succeeded by: The Lord Simon of Glaisdale

Solicitor General for England and Wales
- In office 26 January 1932 – 29 September 1933
- Monarch: George V
- Prime Minister: Ramsay MacDonald
- Preceded by: Sir Thomas Inskip
- Succeeded by: Sir Donald Somervell
- In office 28 March 1928 – 5 June 1929
- Monarch: George V
- Prime Minister: Stanley Baldwin
- Preceded by: Sir Thomas Inskip
- Succeeded by: Sir James Melville

Personal details
- Born: 28 April 1880
- Died: 18 January 1962 (aged 81)

Frank Boyd Merriman, 1st Baron Merriman, GCVO, OBE, PC (28 April 1880 – 18 January 1962), known as Boyd Merriman, was a British Conservative politician and judge.

== Education ==
Merriman was born in Knutsford, Cheshire, and educated at Winchester College. He did not go to university, but became an articled clerk with a firms of solicitors in Manchester, and later studied for the bar, and was a pupil in Gordon Hewart's chambers. He was called to the bar at the Inner Temple in 1904. During World War I, he served with the Manchester Regiment and was appointed OBE in 1918. After the war, Merriman was made a King's Counsel (KC) in 1919, and appointed Recorder of Wigan in 1920.

Merriman had a large practice at the common law bar and on the Northern Circuit. Prominent cases in which he appeared include the 1927 libel case Wright v Gladstone, which arose of defamatory statements concerning the private life of former prime minister William Ewart Gladstone. In 1929, he represented Zionist organisations in front of the Shaw Commission, appointed to investigate the Palestine riots.

== Political and judicial career ==
Merriman was elected at the 1924 general election as Member of Parliament (MP) for Manchester Rusholme, and served as Solicitor General under Stanley Baldwin from 1928 to 1929 and under Ramsay MacDonald from 1932 to 1933, receiving the customary knighthood upon appointment.

He left Parliament in 1933, when he was appointed as President of the Probate, Divorce and Admiralty Division of the High Court, when he was also sworn of the Privy Council. Under his presidency, the Division saw a steep decline in the volume of admiralty cases due to a worldwide decline in shipping, but a large increase in its divorce work, brought in part by the passage of the Matrimonial Causes Act 1937. In 1949, Merriman was considered for appointment as a lord of appeal in ordinary, but ultimately passed over in favour of Sir Cyril Radcliffe.

Merriman was elevated to the peerage in 1941 as Baron Merriman, of Knutsford in the County Palatine of Chester. In 1950 he was appointed a Knight Grand Cross of the Royal Victorian Order (GCVO).

== Family ==
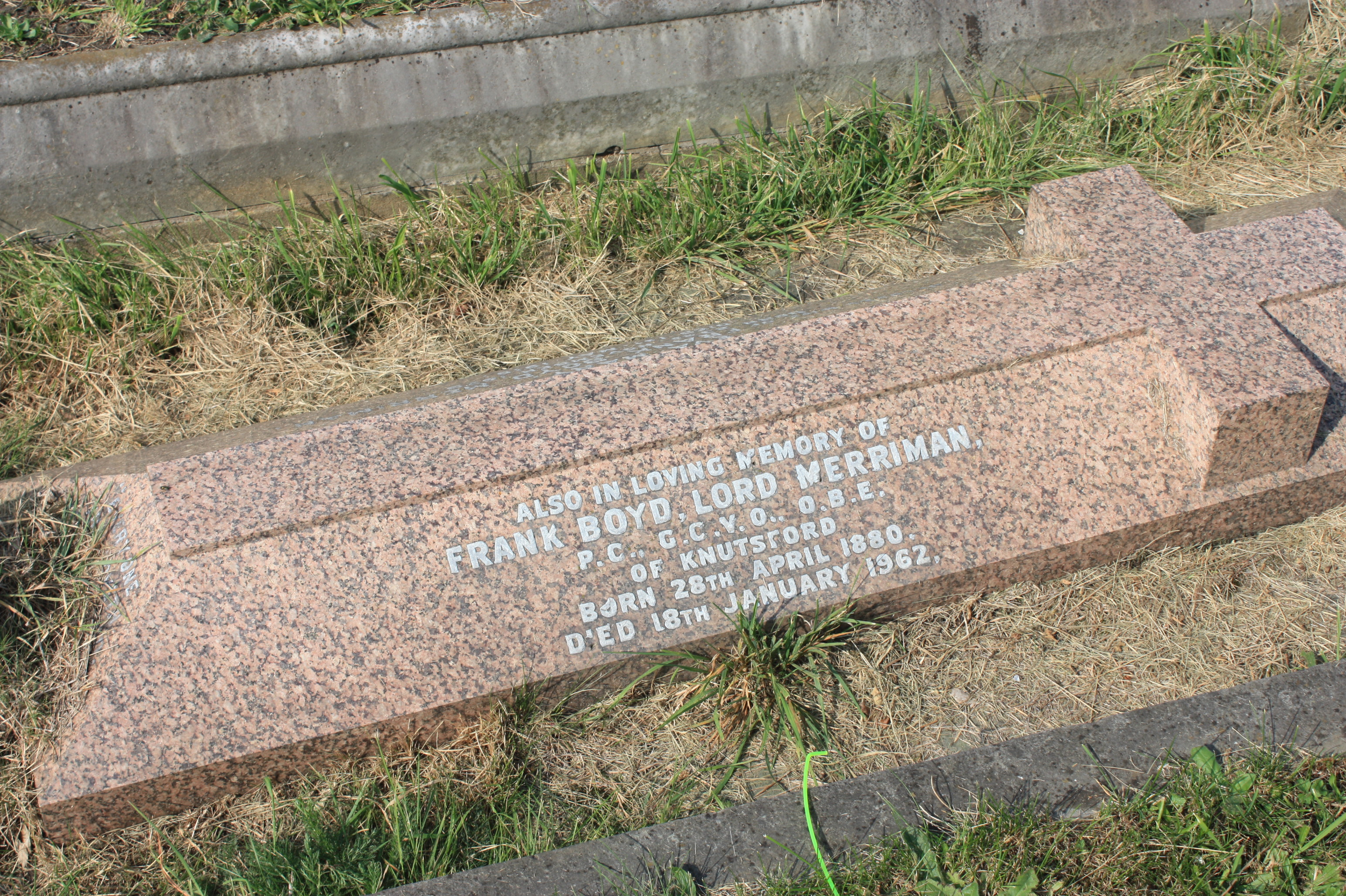
The grave of Frank Boyd Merriman, Brompton Cemetery

Lord Merriman married three times. He married firstly Eva Mary Freer (d. 1919) in 1907. They had two daughters. He married secondly Olive McLaren (d. 1952) in 1920. He married thirdly Jane Lamb in 1953. The peerage became extinct on Lord Merriman's death in London in 1962, aged 81. He had been due to deliver a dissenting speech the House of Lords appeal Ross-Smith v Ross-Smith that day, which was instead given by Lord Hodson.

He was survived by his third wife. He is buried in Brompton Cemetery, London, on the west side of the central enclosed roundel.

Coat of arms of Boyd Merriman, 1st Baron Merriman

Crest
A serpent nowed therefrom issuant a dexter arm embowed in armour Proper garnished Or the hand grasping a short sword also Proper pommel and hilt Gold.
Escutcheon
Argent on a chevron cottised Sable between three Cornish choughs Proper as many crescents of the field.
Supporters
On the dexter side a Welsh Corgi and on the sinister side a Springer Spaniel both Proper.
Motto
Terar Dum Prosim

Parliament of the United Kingdom
Preceded by Charles Masterman	Member of Parliament for Manchester Rusholme; 1924–1933	Succeeded by Edmund Ashworth Radford
Legal offices
Preceded by Sir Thomas Inskip	Solicitor General; 1928–1929	Succeeded by Sir James Melville
Preceded by Sir Thomas Inskip	Solicitor General; 1932–1933	Succeeded by Sir Donald Somervell
Peerage of the United Kingdom
New creation	Baron Merriman; 1941–1962	Extinct
