= Robert Dunstan =

British doctor and political activist (1877–1963)

Robert Dunstan

Robert Dunstan (1877 – 1963) was a British doctor and political activist.

Dunstan qualified as both a barrister and a medical doctor. He worked as a general practitioner, and was a member of Gray's Inn. He stood for the Liberal Party, unsuccessfully, in Totnes in December 1910 on a platform of land reform, and the local party again adopted him as their candidate for the general election expected to take place in 1914/15.

During World War I, Dunstan served in Mesopotamia as a lieutenant with the Royal Army Medical Corps. He returned to the UK in 1917, resigned from the Liberal Party, and instead joined the Independent Labour Party (ILP). Through his membership of the ILP, he was adopted as the Labour Party candidate in Birmingham Moseley at the 1918 general election. He took 16% of the vote and second place in a campaign notable for the large crowds who came to hear him speak. He also ran as the Labour candidate for the 1919 Manchester Rusholme by-election.

Dunstan's wife died in 1921, and the following year, he married Margaret MacCallum, a fellow doctor.

At the 1922 general election, Dunstan stood in Birmingham Ladywood against Neville Chamberlain. He focused his campaign on poor health and education for working-class people in the city, calling Birmingham a "rotten and benighted city", while also maintaining his focus on land reform. He came within 2,500 votes of unseating Chamberlain, and improved his vote again at the 1923 general election.

Early in 1924, Dunstan visited the Soviet Union, and concluded that conditions for workers were better there than in Britain. Shortly afterwards, he resigned from the ILP and joined the Communist Party of Great Britain (CPGB). He tried to get the local Labour Party in Ladywood to re-adopt him for the 1924 general election, but they would not. He instead stood in Birmingham West for the CPGB, describing himself as a "workers' candidate"; he gained the backing of several local Labour Party branches, and won 32% of the vote.

In 1928, the Labour Party banned CPGB activists from holding joint membership. Despite this, the Edgbaston Labour Party voted not to expel Dunstan; this led the national Labour Party to disaffiliate the branch and form a new one. Surprisingly, the CPGB decided Dunstan should run in Bethnal Green South West at the 1929 general election; this was closer to his home in Fulham, but he did not perform well, taking only 7.7% of the vote.

Dunstan remained active in less high-profile roles in communist politics in Birmingham until the end of World War II. He died in 1963.
