= Robert Burdon Stoker =

British politician

Robert Burdon Stoker (19 June 1859 – 4 September 1919) was a British shipping magnate and Conservative politician.

== Shipping career ==
Stoker was born in north-east England and educated at Liverpool College. Aged 17 he was given his first ship, a 500-ton coaster, by his father. He entered a Liverpool sailing ship firm, involved in the American and Canadian trades, and became its manager. In 1882, he was invited by Christopher Furness, a director of the Furness, Withy (FW) shipping group, to become one of his aides.

Stoker opened an office in Newcastle-upon-Tyne for the start of the Furness Line's operations to North America and within two years the line was operating ten ships on the North Atlantic. Stoker was asked to open an FW office in London in 1890, by which time he owned a 3,500-ton tramp steamer named the Sydenham and later the steamer Knutsford. Furness, Withy and Company was formed in 1891, with Christopher Furness as chairman and Stoker as ship director. Stoker went to New York City in 1896 on behalf of FW to buy the Philadelphia Trans-Atlantic Line, returning after six months.

On the formation of Manchester Liners Limited (ML) in 1898, FW took a major shareholding in the new company and Stoker resigned from FW's board to become ML's first managing director. A contemporary article in Syren and Shipping said that Stoker was a "shrewd man of business, an able administrator at the head of affairs and the capital of Lancashire behind it, ML should flourish exceedingly". On the death in 1912 of Lord Furness, as he had become, Stoker was elected as chairman of ML, remaining in office until his death.

Stoker's son, Kenneth Stoker, became a director of ML in 1919 and managing director in 1932. He retired in June 1968 after 49 years service. Kenneth's son, also Robert Burdon Stoker, joined ML in 1932 and retired as chairman in 1979.

Stoker was also a director of the Manchester Ship Canal Company and was elected president of the Manchester Steamship Owners Association. In 1917 he became President of the Manchester Chamber of Commerce. Stoker had lived in Knutsford.

== Parliamentary work ==
In March 1918 the sitting MP for Manchester South, major Philip Glazebrook, was killed in action. Stoker was chosen as the Coalition Conservative candidate for the vacant seat, and was elected unopposed.

The Representation of the People Act 1918 reorganised Manchester's constituencies, and Stoker was elected as first MP for the new Rusholme constituency.

R B Stoker died at his home in September 1919, aged 60 after a long illness.

Parliament of the United Kingdom
Preceded by Philip Glazebrook	Member of Parliament for Manchester South; 1918–1918	Constituency abolished
New constituency	Member of Parliament for Manchester Rusholme; 1918–1919	Succeeded by John Henry Thorpe
