= Manchester South =

Parliamentary constituency in the United Kingdom, 1885–1918

- Former borough constituency for the House of Commons
- Major settlements: Manchester

1885–1918
- Seats: One
- Created from: Manchester
- Replaced by: Moss Side; Rusholme

Manchester South was one of six parliamentary constituencies created in 1885 by the division of the Parliamentary Borough of Manchester, England. It returned one Member of Parliament (MP) to the House of Commons of the Parliament of the United Kingdom, elected by the first-past-the-post voting system. The constituency was abolished in 1918.

== Boundaries ==
The constituency was created by the Redistribution of Seats Act 1885, and consisted of the following areas:

- The part of the civil parish of Chorlton upon Medlock south of the centres of the following roads: Cavendish Street, Grosvenor Street, Upper Brook Street, Dover Street, St. Leonards Street. (The remainder of the parish was included in the Manchester East constituency.)
- The Local Government district of Moss Side
- The Local Government District of Rusholme
- The detached part of the parish of Gorton included within the former parliamentary borough.
- The Hamlet of Kirkmanshulme (a detached part of the parish of Newton).

=== Redistribution ===
The seat was abolished in 1918, when the Representation of the People Act redrew constituencies throughout Great Britain and Ireland. Manchester's representation was increased to ten members of parliament, and the former Manchester South was divided between the areas of the new Moss Side and Rusholme constituencies.

== Members of Parliament ==
Election	Member	Party
1885	Sir Henry Roscoe	Liberal
1895	John Campbell	Liberal Unionist
1900 by-election	William Peel	Liberal Unionist
1906	Arthur Haworth	Liberal
1912 by-election	Philip Glazebrook	Conservative
1918 by-election	Robert Burdon Stoker	Conservative
1918	constituency abolished	

== Election results ==
Decades:	1880s; 1890s; 1900s; 1910s

=== Elections in the 1880s ===
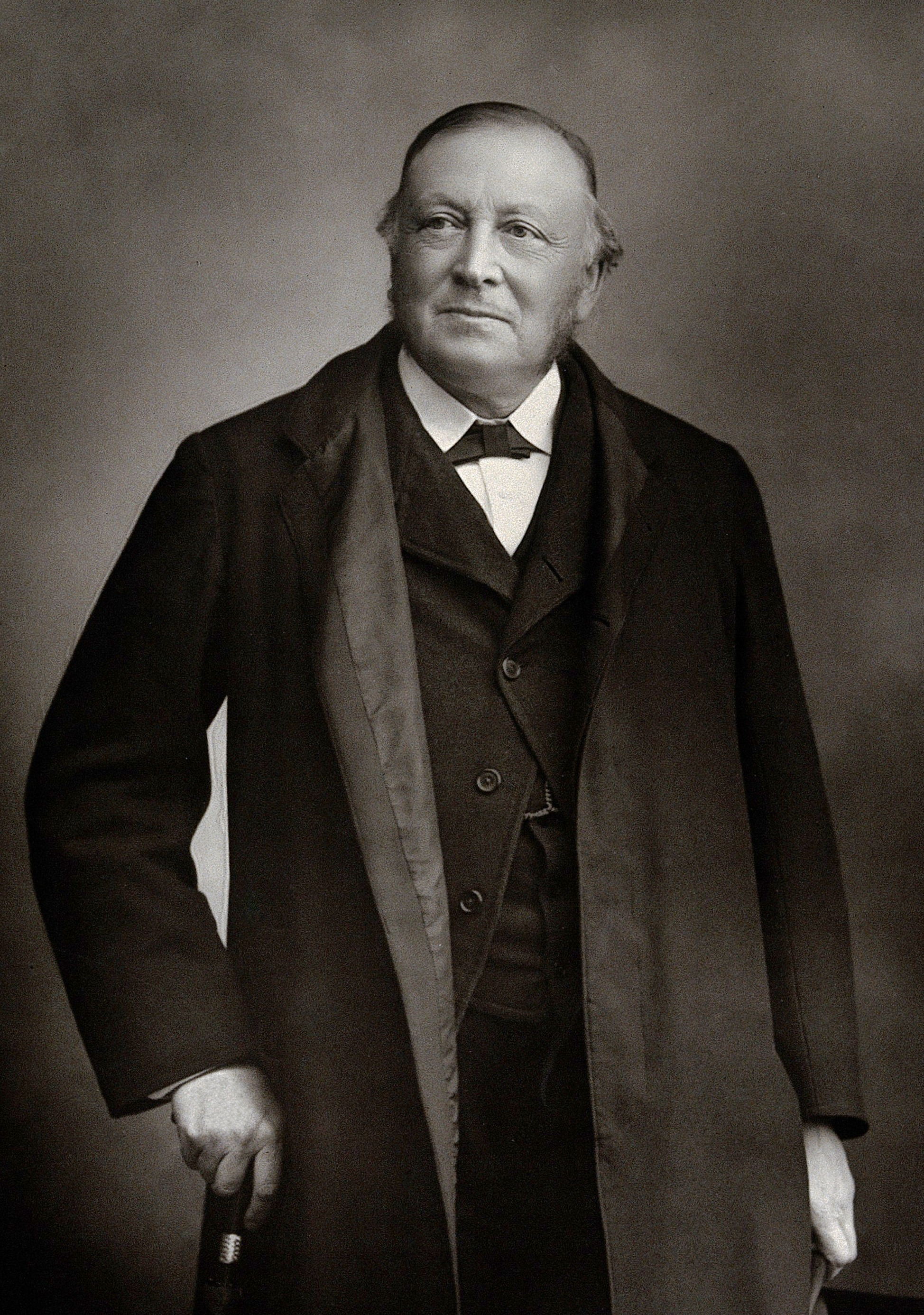
Roscoe

General election 1885: Manchester South
Party	Candidate	Votes	%	±%
Liberal	Sir Henry Roscoe	3,791	54.8	
Conservative	Peter Royle	3,121	45.2	
Majority		670	9.6	
Turnout		6,912	81.0	
Registered electors		8,534		
Liberal win (new seat)				

General election 1886: Manchester South
Party	Candidate	Votes	%	±%
Liberal	Sir Henry Roscoe	3,407	52.6	−2.2
Conservative	Thomas Sowler	3,072	47.4	+2.2
Majority		335	5.2	−4.4
Turnout		6,479	75.9	−5.1
Registered electors		8,534		
Liberal hold		Swing	-2.2	

=== Elections in the 1890s ===
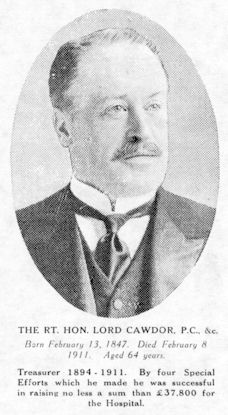
Emlyn

General election 1892: Manchester South
Party	Candidate	Votes	%	±%
Liberal	Sir Henry Roscoe	4,245	51.1	−1.5
Conservative	Frederick Campbell	4,064	48.9	+1.5
Majority		181	2.2	−3.0
Turnout		9,309	81.2	+5.3
Registered electors		10,228		
Liberal hold		Swing	-1.5	

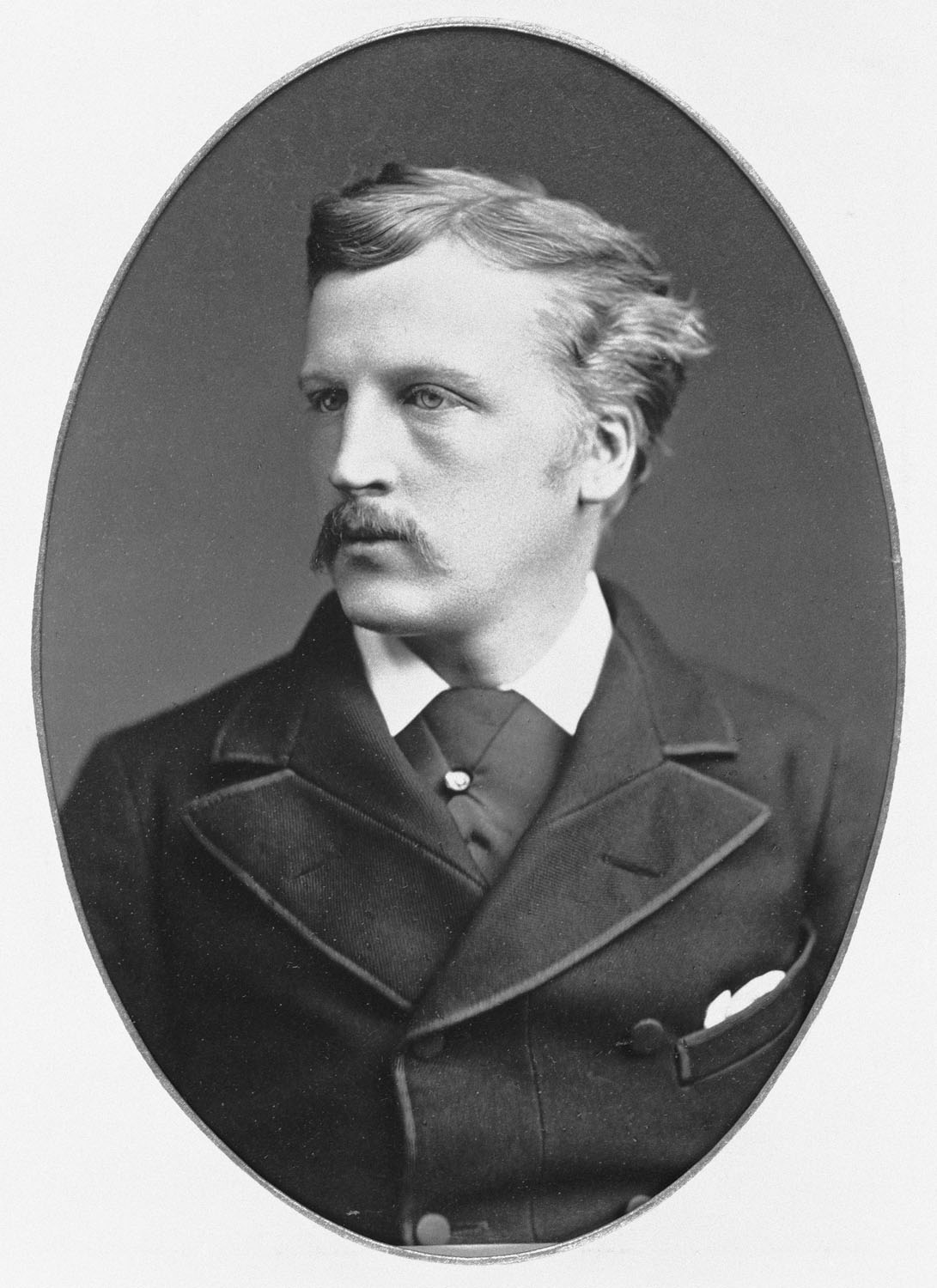
Lorne

General election 1895: Manchester South
Party	Candidate	Votes	%	±%
Liberal Unionist	John Campbell	4,457	50.4	+1.5
Liberal	Sir Henry Roscoe	4,379	49.6	−1.5
Majority		78	0.8	N/A
Turnout		8,836	80.7	−0.5
Registered electors		10,945		
Liberal Unionist gain from Liberal		Swing	+1.5	

=== Elections in the 1900s ===
Peel

1900 Manchester South by-election
Party	Candidate	Votes	%	±%
Liberal Unionist	William Peel	5,497	61.4	+11.0
Liberal	Leifchild Jones	3,458	38.6	−11.0
Majority		2,039	22.8	+22.0
Turnout		8,955	76.0	−4.7
Registered electors		11,788		
Liberal Unionist hold		Swing	+11.0	

Jones

General election 1900: Manchester South
Party	Candidate	Votes	%	±%
Liberal Unionist	William Peel	5,122	57.1	+6.7
Liberal	Edwyn Holt	3,850	42.9	−6.7
Majority		1,272	14.2	+13.4
Turnout		8,972	76.1	−4.6
Registered electors		11,788		
Liberal Unionist hold		Swing	+6.7	

Haworth

General election 1906: Manchester South
Party	Candidate	Votes	%	±%
Liberal	Arthur Haworth	8,002	68.0	+25.1
Conservative	L Eaton Smith	3,770	32.0	−25.1
Majority		4,232	36.0	N/A
Turnout		11,772	82.8	+6.7
Registered electors		14,221		
Liberal gain from Liberal Unionist		Swing	+25.1	

=== Elections in the 1910s ===
General election January 1910: Manchester South
Party	Candidate	Votes	%	±%
Liberal	Arthur Haworth	8,121	58.9	−9.1
Conservative	Charles Ward-Jackson	5,669	41.1	+9.1
Majority		2,452	17.8	−18.2
Turnout		13,790	88.4	+5.6
Liberal hold		Swing	-9.1	

General election December 1910: Manchester South
Party	Candidate	Votes	%	±%
Liberal	Arthur Haworth	Unopposed		
Liberal hold				

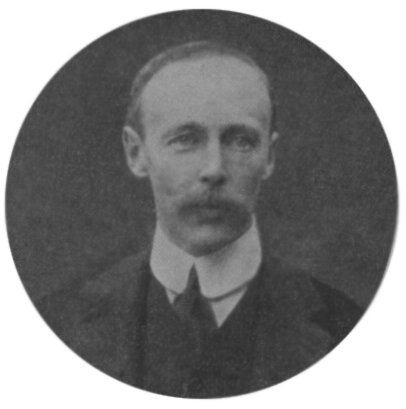
Glazebrook

1912 Manchester South by-election
Party	Candidate	Votes	%	±%
Unionist	Philip Glazebrook	7,051	52.1	New
Liberal	Arthur Haworth	6,472	47.9	N/A
Majority		579	4.2	N/A
Turnout		13,523	84.0	N/A
Unionist gain from Liberal		Swing	N/A	

General Election 1914–15:

Another General Election was required to take place before the end of 1915. The political parties had been making preparations for an election to take place and by July 1914, the following candidates had been selected;

- Unionist: Philip Glazebrook
- Liberal:

1918 Manchester South by-election
Party	Candidate	Votes	%	±%
Unionist	Robert Burdon Stoker	Unopposed		
Unionist hold				

== Sources ==
Election Results:

- https://web.archive.org/web/20060520143104/http://www.manchester.gov.uk/elections/archive/gen1900.htm
- https://web.archive.org/web/20060520143047/http://www.manchester.gov.uk/elections/archive/gen1945.htm

Viscount Emlyn:

- http://yba.llgc.org.uk/AnaServer?ybawbo+1281713+aview.anv+v=av&l=e&show=1

Leifchild Stratten Leif-Jones:
