= Jill Greenwood =

English artist and nuclear disarmament activist (1910–1995)

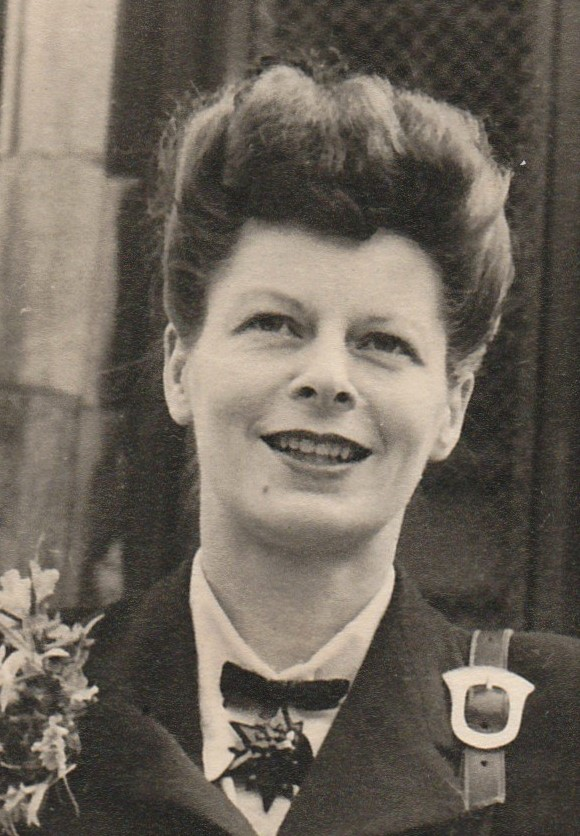
Greenwood in 1946

Gillian Greenwood, Baroness Greenwood of Rossendale (née Crawshay-Williams; 11 April 1910 – 19 July 1995), commonly known as Jill Greenwood, was an English artist, illustrator and designer, co-creator of the Ministry of Information's Make-Do and Mend pamphlet series and an important early member of the Campaign for Nuclear Disarmament.

== Early life ==
Born Gillian Crawshay-Williams in London to parents Leslie Crawshay-Williams and Joyce Collier Kilburn, Greenwood was the younger of their two children (her elder brother being writer Rupert Crawshay-Williams, born in 1908).

Leslie Crawshay-Williams was the son of Welsh MP Arthur John Williams, while Joyce was the only child of artists John Collier and Marian Collier (née Huxley), making Jill's maternal great-grandfather English biologist and "Darwin's Bulldog" Thomas Henry Huxley.

Leslie and Joyce married in 1906 and divorced in 1918. Joyce Collier later remarried automobile retail agent Drysdale Kilburn; she was an accomplished artist in her own right and was a member of The Royal Society of Miniature Painters, Sculptors & Gravers.

After her parents' divorce, Greenwood was sent to a boarding school near Bishop's Stortford where she became head girl and a skilled tennis player.

== Career ==
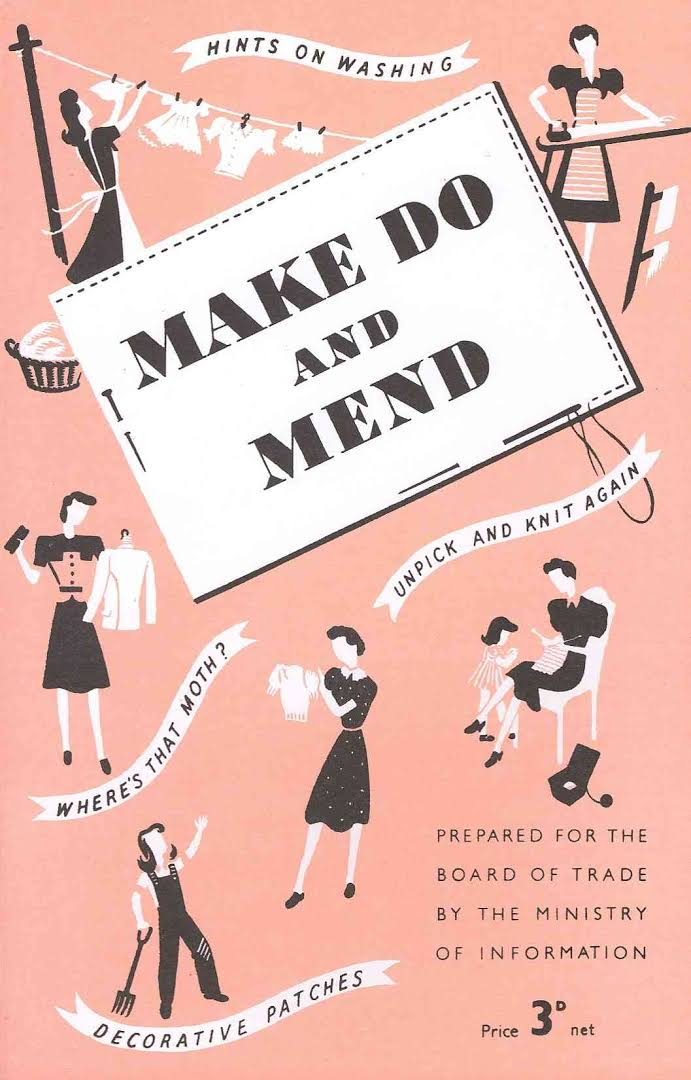
Make Do and Mend pamphlet cover designed by Jill Greenwood

Greenwood attended art school in Chelsea and then joined the fashion brand Jaeger in 1931, where she known as "Crawshay". Initially employed in retail at their flagship Regent Street store, Greenwood's artistic flair was recognised and she was put in charge of display.

During the Second World War, Greenwood wrote and illustrated Make Do and Mend pamphlets for the Ministry of Information. These iconic publications provided tips to housewives on harsh rationing, giving advice on how to stay frugal yet chic by reusing old clothing, creating ‘decorative patches’ to cover holes in worn garments; unpicking and re-knitting old jumpers, and protecting one's garments against the ‘moth menace’.

She remained at Jaeger for almost 30 years, playing a role in the design of their distinctive criss-crossed 'J' logo, and developing a reputation for her innovative and whimsical window dressings:

"Post-war at a time of shortage she famously designed an enormous pair of scales for the window of Jaeger's Regent Street shop balancing sheep, representing cashmere sweaters available only for export, against vital imports such as tea, coffee and New Zealand butter. Underneath in the shop window there was the laconic statement "Britain must balance her budget".

She devised the Regent Street decorations for the Festival of Britain in 1951, and in 1954 was the designer of Regent Street's first Christmas lights. In 1959 she arranged the decoration of Oxford Street's lampposts between Tottenham Court Road and Marble Arch for the first Christmas display. Eventually she was put in charge of Jaeger's window displays across the country, before retiring in 1960.

== Personal life ==
Greenwood married German-born illustrator and cartoonist Walter Goetz in 1938. They divorced shortly afterward but they and their families remained good friends.

In 1940 she married British Labour Party politician Tony Greenwood (1911–1982), who entered Parliament as member for Heywood and Radcliffe in a by-election in February 1946, becoming a prominent Cabinet Minister in the 1950s and 1960s. They had two daughters, Susanna and Dinah Murray.

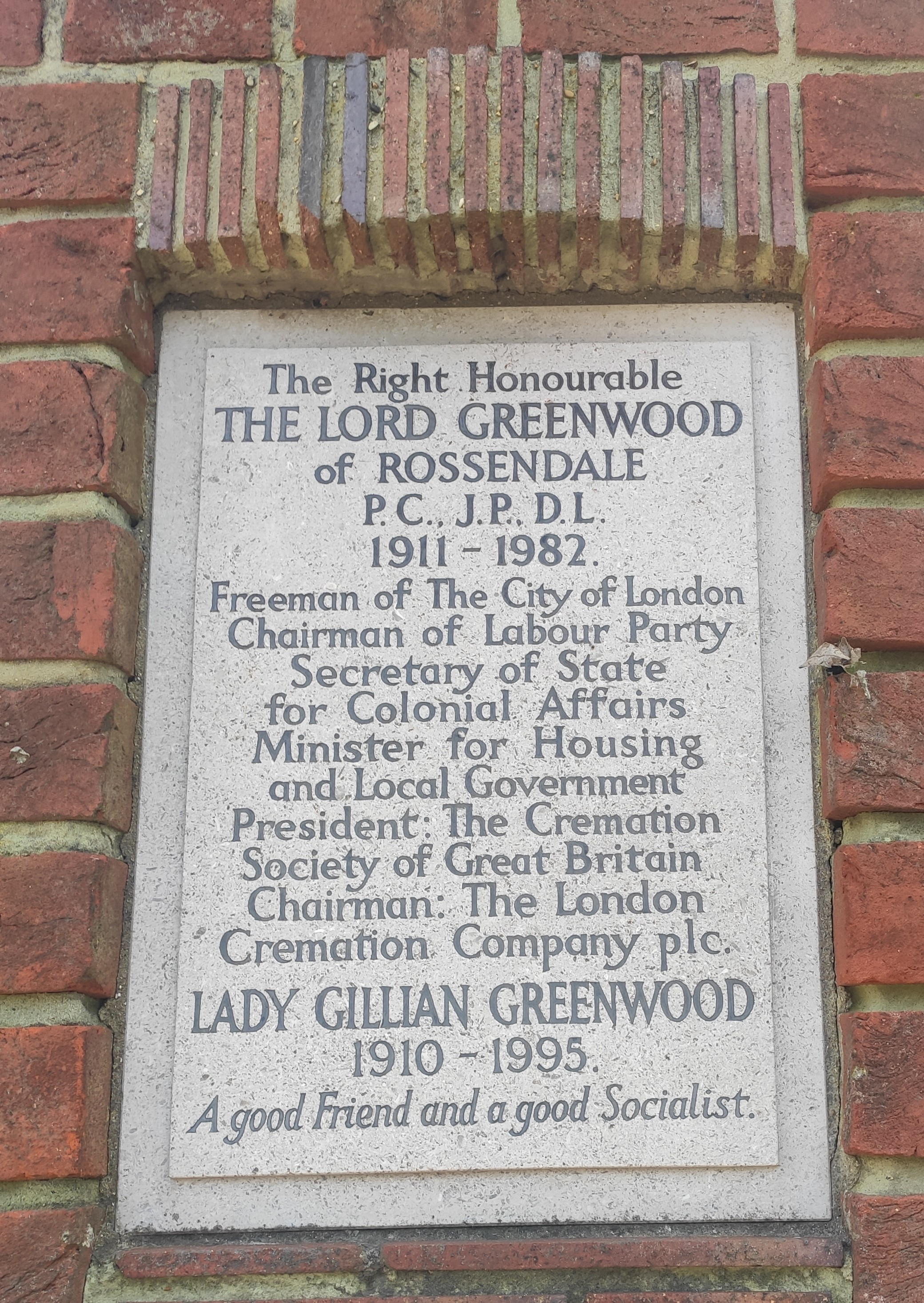
Plaque dedicated to Greenwood and her husband at Golders Green Crematorium

Greenwood died in 1995. She was cremated at Golders Green Crematorium.

== Politics ==
A committed socialist and pacifist, Greenwood was an important early member of the Campaign for Nuclear Disarmament (CND). As a male and prominent politician, her husband Tony was more visible, but Greenwood was the driving force behind their involvement.

Overcoming Tony's initial caution, they were both familiar figures at the head of Aldermaston marches in the early 1960s, while their daughter Susanna helped to found CND's youth wing.
