= 1921 Heywood and Radcliffe by-election =

UK Parliamentary by-election

Illingworth

The 1921 Heywood and Radcliffe by-election was held on 8 June 1921. The by-election was held due to the elevation to the peerage of the incumbent Coalition Liberal MP, Albert Illingworth. It was won by the Labour candidate Walter Halls.

Heywood and Radcliffe by-election, 1921
| Party | Candidate | Votes | % | ±% |
|---|---|---|---|---|
| Labour | Walter Halls | 13,430 | 41.7 | +9.3 |
| National Liberal | Abraham England | 13,125 | 40.7 | −26.9 |
| Liberal | Cornelius Pickstone | 5,671 | 17.6 | −50.0 |
| Majority | | 305 | 1.0 | N/A |
| Turnout | | 32,226 | 80.9 | +28.7 |
| Labour gain from Liberal | | Swing | +18.1 | |
