= James Wootton =

James Wootton may refer to:

- James Wootton (footballer) (1895–1960), English footballer
- James Wootton (animator), Canadian animator
- Jimmy Wootton, English cricketer

== See also ==
- James Wootton-Davies, British member of parliament
