= Listed buildings in Barrowford =

Barrowford is a civil parish in Pendle, Lancashire, England. It contains 34 listed buildings that are recorded in the National Heritage List for England. Of these, two are at Grade II*, the middle grade, and the others are at Grade II, the lowest grade. The parish contains the village of Barrowford and some surrounding countryside. Originally an agricultural community, weaving came to the parish in the late 18th century. This was initially carried out in weavers' cottages, and later in mills. The Leeds and Liverpool Canal arrived in the parish towards the end of the 18th century.

The listed buildings reflect the history of the parish. They include farmhouses and farm buildings, some of which have been absorbed by the growing village, larger houses, and weavers' cottages. Associated with the canal are locks, bridges, and an aqueduct. The other listed buildings include a packhorse bridge, a road bridge, public houses, a toll house, a former mill and a chimney, a milestone, and a bandstand.

== Key ==
Grade	Criteria
II*	Particularly important buildings of more than special interest
II	Buildings of national importance and special interest

== Buildings ==
Name and location	Photograph	Date	Notes	Grade
Park Hill; 53.85390°N 2.21059°W		16th century	The oldest part of the house is the rear wing, In the 17th century an extension consisting of a cross wing and a porch was added, followed by another wing in the 18th century; the building has later been converted into a heritage centre. It is in stone with a stone-slate roof, and has a double L-shaped plan in two storeys. The windows in the older parts are mullioned, and in the 18th-century wing there is a doorway with a pediment on consoles.	II
Cruck barn, Pendle Heritage Centre; 53.85355°N 2.21021°W	—	Late 16th century	The barn was moved to its present site from Cliviger in 1991. It was originally completely timber-framed, and was clad in stone in the 17th or 18th century. The barn has four bays and contains three full cruck trusses.	II
Higherford Old Bridge; 53.85768°N 2.21050°W		1583–91	A packhorse bridge crossing Pendle Water, it is in stone and consists of a single span with voussoirs. Initially without parapets, these were added in 1815. The bridge is also a Scheduled Ancient Monument.	II*
1 Fold and 2, 4 and 6 Holt Square; 53.85616°N 2.21096°W		c. 1600	This originated as one house and was later divided into four dwellings. The building is in stone with a stone-slate roof and has two storeys. Most of the windows are mullioned, but there are also sash, casement and modern windows, The doorways vary.	II
Laund Farmhouse and Cottage; 53.84515°N 2.23248°W	—	c. 1600	Originating as one house consisting of a hall and cross wing, it has been divided later into a house and a cottage. The building is in stone with a stone-slate roof and has two storeys. The windows are mullioned, some with semicircular heads. The doorcase has Doric pilasters.	II
Lower Fulshaw Head Farmhouse; 53.85535°N 2.22944°W	—	1630	A stone house in two storeys and three bays. The mullions have been removed from the windows. The doorway has chamfered jambs and an ogee head, and above it is a datestone. There is a later doorway with a plain surround.	II
White Bear Inn; 53.85347°N 2.21526°W		1667 (probable)	Originally a house, later converted into a public house, it is in stone. there are two storeys and three bays, and a circular extension to the right. Between the first and second bays is a jettied three-storey porch. The porch and the bays are gabled with finials. The windows are mullioned, and the porch has a moulded doorway with a Tudor arch. Inside is a two-inglenook fireplace.	II
Barn, Park Hill; 53.85396°N 2.21111°W		Late 17th century (possible)	The barn is in stone with a stone-slate roof, and has two storeys. The original part contains a wide entrance with a segmental arch, a door, windows, and two rows of pigeon holes at eaves level. To the left is an extension with a two-storey projection, and more pigeon holes with alighting ledges.	II
Watermeetings; 53.86461°N 2.21642°W	—	Late 17th century (prabable)	Originally one house, later divided into two dwellings, in stone that is partly rendered, with a stone-slate roof. It is in two storeys, and has mullioned windows, with some mullions removed, and a sash window. The doorway has a chamfered surround.	II
Lamb Working Mens Club; 53.85259°N 2.21634°W		1696	Originally a house consisting of a hall and cross wing, later used as a club. It is in stone with a stone-slate roof in two storeys with attics. The windows are mullioned, and the window in the attic of the cross wing has a shaped head. There is a three-storey jettied porch with a Tudor doorway. On the gables are finials consisting of obelisks supported by Ionic capitals.	II*
2 and 4 Fold; 53.85650°N 2.21105°W	—	Mid 18th century	Two stone cottages with a stone-slate roof in two storeys, The ground floor windows have been altered, and some mullions have been removed from the upper floor windows. There is a single-storey extension to the right.	II
3, 5 and 7 Fold; 53.85629°N 2.21094°W		Mid 18th century	Three cottages, probably originating as barns, in stone with a stone-slate roof and with two storeys. Each cottage has a doorway and one window in each floor; most of the windows are mullioned, and others have been replaced by casements.	II
239–247 Gisburn Road; 53.85648°N 2.21073°W		Mid 18th century	A terrace of five stone former weavers' cottages with a stone-slate roof in two storeys. Each cottage has a doorway and a window in the ground floor and one or two windows above. All the windows are mullioned.	II
Crowtrees Cottage; 53.85765°N 2.21092°W		Mid 18th century	The house is in stone with a stone-slate roof and has two storeys. The windows are mullioned, and the doorway has a chamfered surround.	II
Sandy Hall; 53.84661°N 2.24267°W		18th century	A stone house with two storeys and a symmetrical front, the right wing having been added in 1875. In the centre is a gable flanked by obelisks and containing an oculus. The wings are gabled, and each contains semicircular-headed windows and an oculus. Other windows are sashes, and the porch is modern.	II
13, 15 and 17 Foreside; 53.85745°N 2.21081°W		1755	Originally a row of three cottages, later converted into two dwellings. They are in stone with modern slate roofs and have two storeys. There are five windows on the ground floor and four in the upper floor, from which some mullions have been removed. The doorway has a plain surround.	II
Clerk's House; 53.85390°N 2.21080°W		Late 18th century	The house is in stone and has a stone-slate roof and two storeys. Above the doorway is a moulded pediment on brackets. The windows are three-light sashes with mullions.	II
Pasture House; 53.85946°N 2.22559°W		1777–78	A stone house where Elizabeth Shackleton died in 1781. It has projecting quoins, in three storeys with a symmetrical three-bay front. The doorway has attached Doric columns, a broken pediment, and a semicircular fanlight. In the top floor are two Diocletian windows, the other windows being sashes. On each side of the house is a wall with an ogee parapet and a rusticated pier, and contained in each wall is a pointed window with intersecting tracery.	II
Barrowford Road Bridge (No 143); 53.85386°N 2.20056°W		1794	The bridge carries a public road over the Leeds and Liverpool Canal. It is in stone, and consists of a single elliptical arch with rusticated voussoirs. The bridge has a plain coped parapet and curved abutments ending in piers.	II
Lock No 48; 53.85515°N 2.20199°W		1794	The lock on the Leeds and Liverpool Canal is in stone with steel gates. The retaining walls curve out at the upper end in quadrants.	II
Lock No 49; 53.85397°N 2.20070°W		1794	The lock on the Leeds and Liverpool Canal is in stone with wooden gates. The retaining walls curve out at the upper end, and there are steps for men and horses.	II
Lock No 50; 53.85279°N 2.20136°W		1794	The lock on the Leeds and Liverpool Canal is in stone with wooden gates. The retaining walls curve out at the upper end in quadrants.	II
Lock No 51; 53.85224°N 2.20230°W		1794	The lock on the Leeds and Liverpool Canal is in stone with wooden gates. The retaining walls curve out at the upper end in quadrants.	II
Swinden Aqueduct; 53.84997°N 2.20422°W	—	1795 (probable)	The aqueduct carries the Leeds and Liverpool Canal over Colne Water. It is in stone, and consists of two elliptical arches with a bull-nosed, domed cutwater. The abutments are slightly curved, and end in piers.	II
99, 101, 103 and 103A Gisburn Road; 53.85196°N 2.21612°W	—	Late 18th to early 19th century	A row of four dwellings, formerly part of a weavers' terrace. They are in stone, No. 99 is stuccoed, and they have a stone-slate roof. They are in three storeys and have modern shop fronts in the ground floor. In the upper floors are two-light mullioned windows, although the mullions have been removed from No. 99.	II
Toll House; 53.85451°N 2.21058°W		1805–07	The toll house is in stone with a stone-slate roof and has two storeys. It has a semi-octagonal plan with a doorway having a plain surround. The two flanking faces each contains two sash windows in each floor.	II
195–211 Gisburn Road; 53.85436°N 2.21180°W		1824	A terrace of nine stone cottages with stone-slate roofs (two replaced by slate) in two storeys. Nos. 195–205 have one window in each floor; the others have two in the upper floor. The windows are mainly two or three-light sashes with mullions, and some are replacements. Four houses have hoods above the doorways.	II
Higherford Mill; 53.85668°N 2.21095°W		1824	Originally a water mill, then a steam mill and textile factory, later converted into workshops. It is in sandstone with a roof of stone-slate and Welsh slate. The main block has three storeys and eight bays. There are single-storey weaving sheds of eight and nine bays to the south and north. At the rear is an engine and boiler house, and a double sluice leading to a water pit. On the entrance front are a wide cart entry, a round-headed doorway and windows, and a loading window in the top floor.	II
Barrowford Bridge; 53.85431°N 2.21054°W		Early 19th century	The bridge carries the B6247 road over Pendle Water. It is in stone and consists of two segmental arches with voussoirs, and it has a plain parapet.	II
Crowtrees, barn, cobbled surface and water tank 53.85813°N 2.21163°W		Early 19th century	A sandstone house with a stone-slate roof and ridge tiles. There are two storeys and a symmetrical three-bay front, with a lower wing to the right. The windows are sashes, and the semicircular doorway has a keystone, imposts, and a fanlight. Attached to the house is a barn, and associated is a cobbled surface containing an underground circular water tank.	II
George and Dragon Public House; 53.85461°N 2.21084°W		Early 19th century (probable)	The public house is in roughcast stone with a stone flagged roof. There are two low storeys and three bays, with a lower bay to the left. The doorway and windows have plain surrounds; some of the windows are sashes, others are modern.	II
Higherford Mill Chimney; 53.85657°N 2.21211°W		1832	The chimney served the engine house of Higherford spinning mill, and now stands in an isolated position. It is in stone and has a square plan.	II
Milestone; 53.85301°N 2.21542°W	—	1863	The milestone is set into a wall. It is 5 feet (1.5 m) high and rises 2 feet (0.61 m) above the wall. The milestone consists of a single piece of moulded stone with a rusticated base. Its sides are incised with the distances in miles to Burnley and to Gisburne.	II
Bandstand; 53.83789°N 2.22705°W		1896	The bandstand is in Victoria Park, and has a stone base with cast iron above. It has an octagonal plan, with five stone steps leading up to the platform. The bandstand has pillars with voluted capitals, a frieze, and a dentilled cornice. On the top is a dome and a lead roof surmounted by a smaller dome with a finial. Around the bandstand are railings and a gate with Art Nouveau features.	II
