= 1940 Heywood and Radcliffe by-election =

UK Parliamentary by-election

The 1940 Heywood and Radcliffe by-election was held on 28 August 1940. The by-election was held due to the death of the incumbent Conservative MP, Richard Porritt. It was won by the Conservative candidate James Wootton-Davies, who was elected unopposed.
