= Lancashire Witches Walk =

Long-distance footpath in Lancashire, England

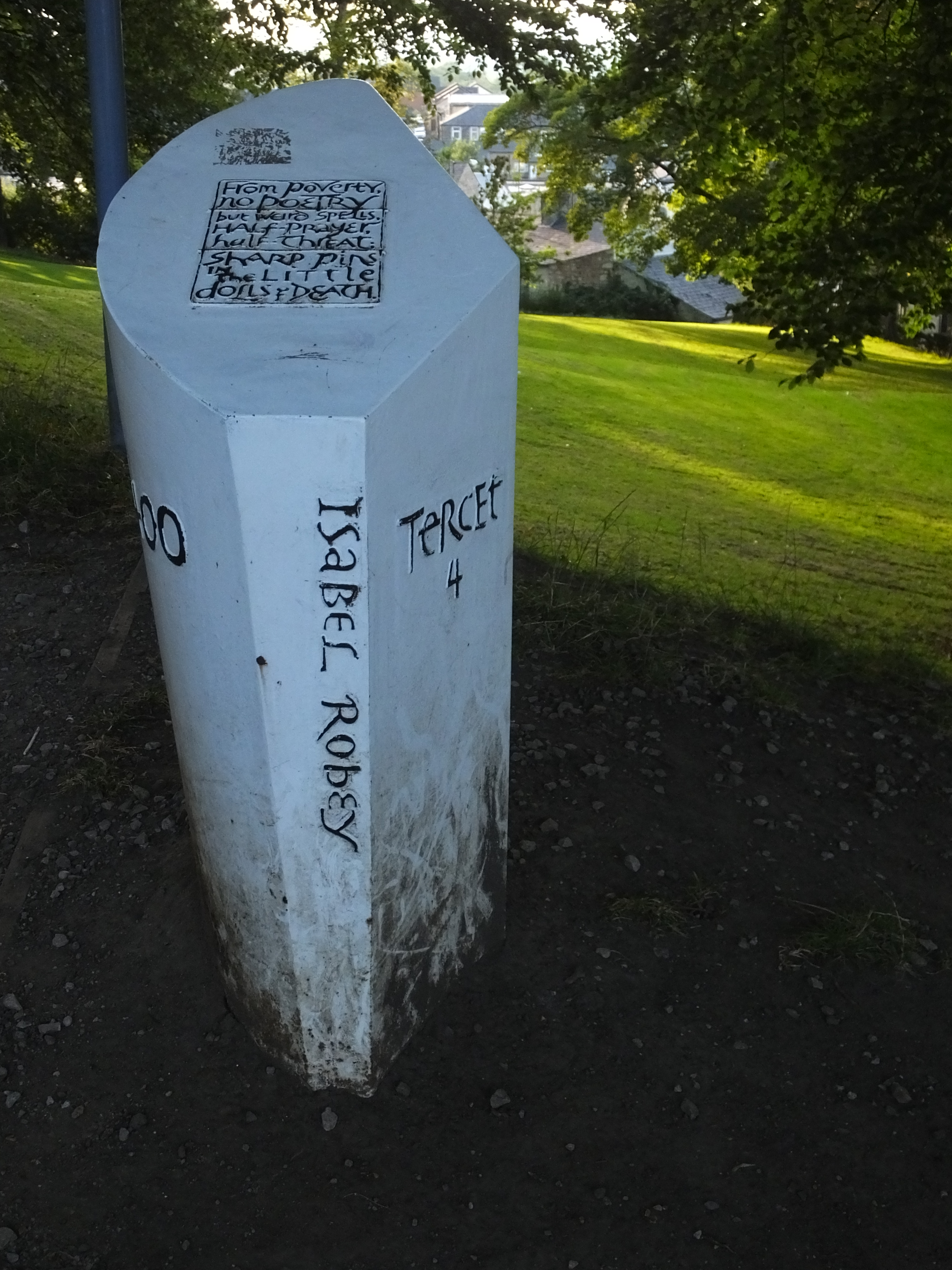
- A tercet waymarker at Clitheroe Castle
- Length: 51 mi (82 km)
- Location: Lancashire, England
- Trailheads: Barrowford, Lancaster
- Use: Hiking

The Lancashire Witches Walk is a 51-mile (82 km) long-distance footpath opened in 2012, between Barrowford and Lancaster, all in Lancashire, England. It starts at Pendle Heritage Centre in Barrowford before passing through the Forest of Pendle, the town of Clitheroe and the Forest of Bowland to finish at Lancaster Castle.

The route was created to commemorate the 400th anniversary of the trials of the Pendle witches. Ten cast iron tercet waymarkers, designed by Stephen Raw, each inscribed with a verse of a poem by the poet laureate Carol Ann Duffy, have been installed at sites along the way.

== History ==
The route was designed by Ian Thornton-Bryar and John Sparshatt, following initial suggestions from Sue Flowers, the artistic director of the Lancashire-based arts organization Green Close.

== Route ==
The sustainable 51-mile long-distance walk commemorates the 400th anniversary of the hanging of nine of the Lancashire Witches. Starting in Barrowford and finishing at Lancaster Castle, where the witches were tried, the walk follows the most likely route that the witches were taken, on their way to be sentenced and hanged. Conveniently, the route also visits some of Lancashire’s best fells, using Slaidburn YHA as a base, almost exactly halfway along. While the start, finish and mid-points are accessible by public transport, much of the rest is remote. Green Close, a rural arts organisation based in the village of Melling, organised the installation of 10 half-tonne cast-iron installations on or near the path, embossed with stanzas of the walk’s poem, written by the poet laureate Carol Ann Duffy, all funded by the Heritage Lottery Fund. The route has been used in seven walking festivals (one by Clitheroe, two by Bowland and four by The Pendle Walking Festival). One originally Lancaster-based charity has used it to raise £5,200, by getting 50 youngsters to walk the northern half on midsummer's days.

== Tercet waymarkers ==
Tercet waymarker locations
No. (ref)	Location	Coordinates
One	Pendle Heritage Centre, Barrowford	53.8533°N 2.2113°W
Two	Ogden Valley, near Barley	53.8545°N 2.2879°W
Three	Spring Wood, near Whalley	53.8202°N 2.3947°W
Four	Clitheroe Castle	53.8712°N 2.3928°W
Five	Slaidburn car park	53.9662°N 2.4382°W
Six	Croasdale Quarry, Bowland Forest High	54.0046°N 2.4850°W
Seven	Claughton Quarries, Caton-with-Littledale	54.0738°N 2.6583°W
Eight	Crook o' Lune, Halton-with-Aughton	54.0763°N 2.7325°W
Nine	Williamson Park, Lancaster	54.0456°N 2.7814°W
Ten	Lancaster Castle	54.0487°N 2.8048°W

Carol Ann Duffy, UK poet laureate and Professor of Modern Poetry at Manchester Metropolitan University, was commissioned to create a poem to mark the anniversary of those 1612 witch trials. The poem, The Lancashire Witches, is made up of ten tercet verses, for the ten people hanged at Gallows Hill in Lancaster. Stephen Raw designed waymarkers, each inscribed with a verse of a poem and featuring the name of one of those executed, which have been placed on the route.

== Gallery ==
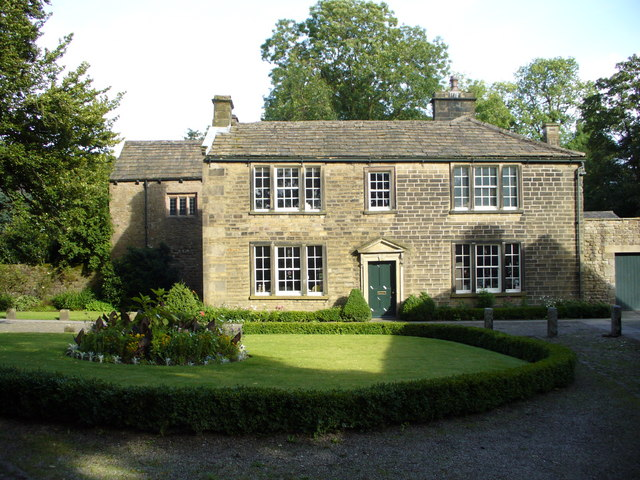
Pendle Heritage Centre, Barrowford

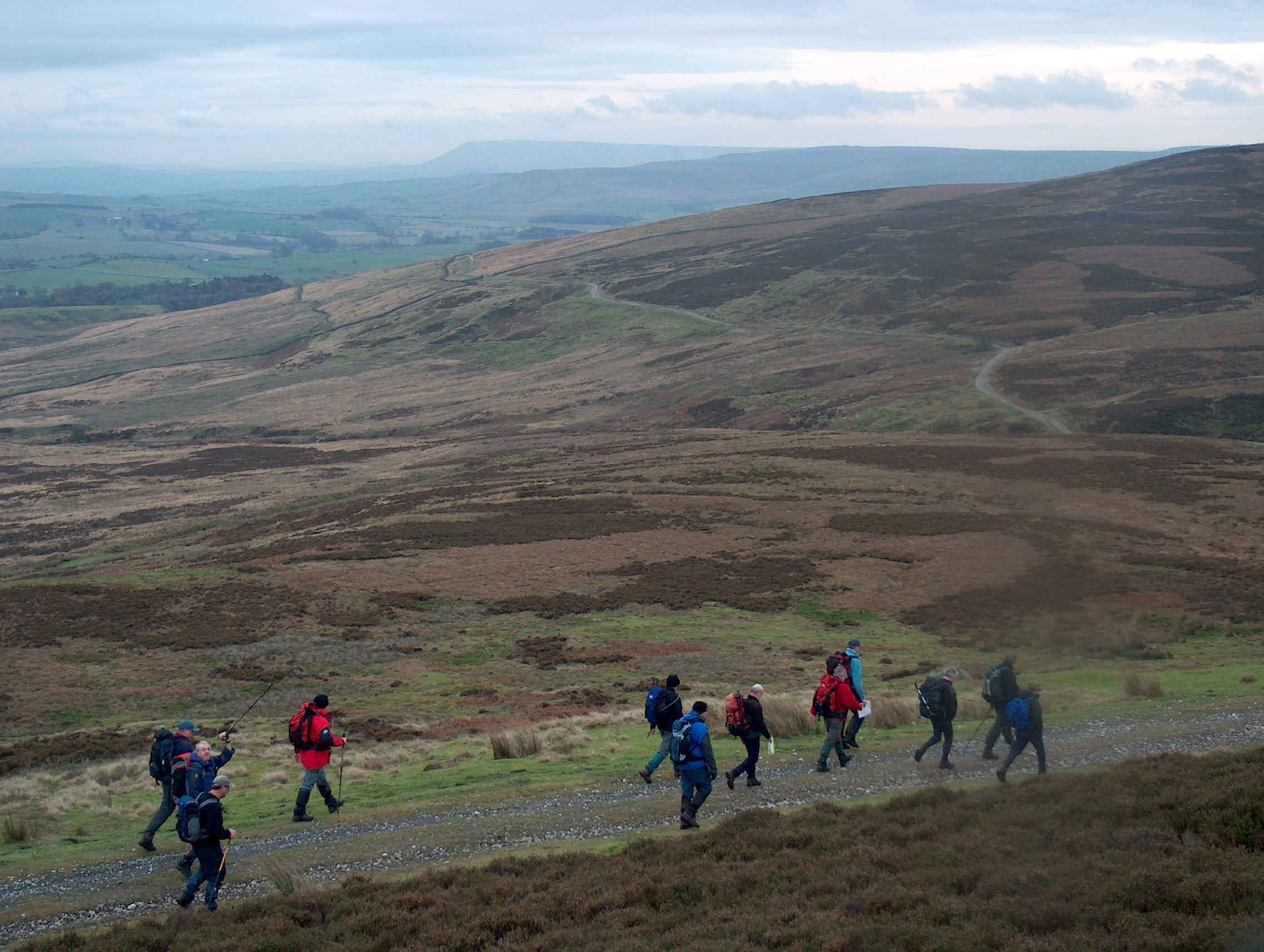
On the Salter Fell Track/Hornby Road

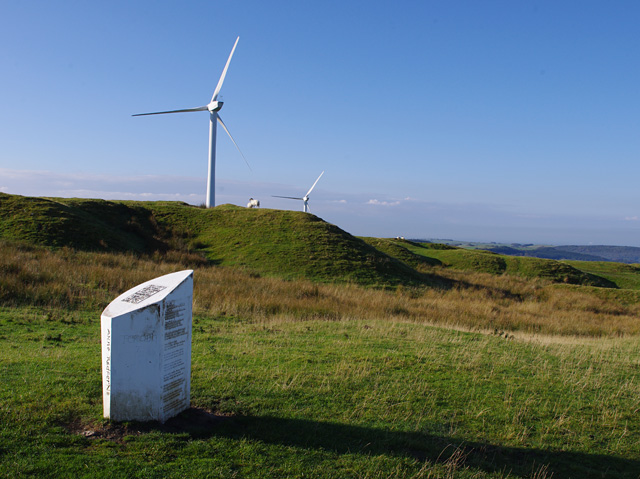
Tercet Seven, Claughton Quarries, Caton with Littledale

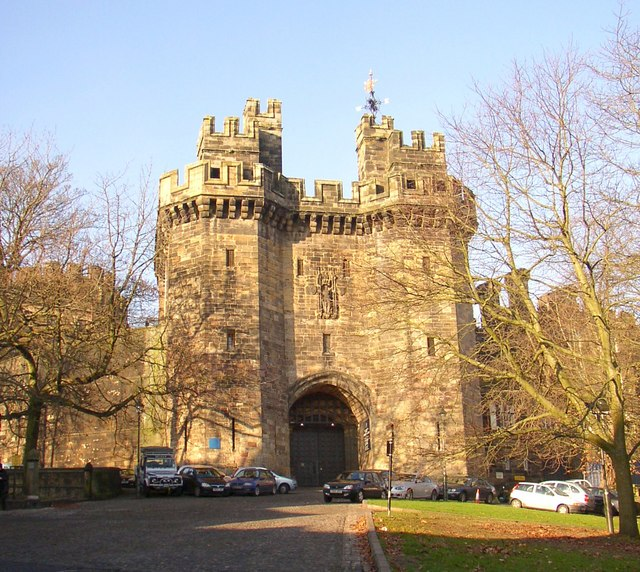
Lancaster Castle gateway

== See also ==
- Pendle witches
