= Walter Halls =

Walter Halls (16 June 1871 – 20 October 1953) was a British trade unionist and politician.

Born in Gaulby in Leicestershire, Halls was educated locally before finding work on the railways. He became an active trade unionist, and was elected as an organiser of the National Union of Railwaymen in 1909. He was also active in the Labour Party, standing unsuccessfully for it in Northampton at the 1918 general election. He stood again in the 1921 Heywood and Radcliffe by-election, winning the seat, but lost it at the 1922 general election and again failed to win it in 1923. In 1931, he stood instead in Derby, but was once more unsuccessful.

Halls also served on Nottingham City Council, and was Lord Mayor of Nottingham in 1940/41.

Parliament of the United Kingdom
Preceded by Albert Illingworth	Member of Parliament for Heywood and Radcliffe; 1921–1922	Succeeded by Abraham England
