= Barrowford =

Village in Lancashire, England

Coordinates: 53.851°N 2.221°W

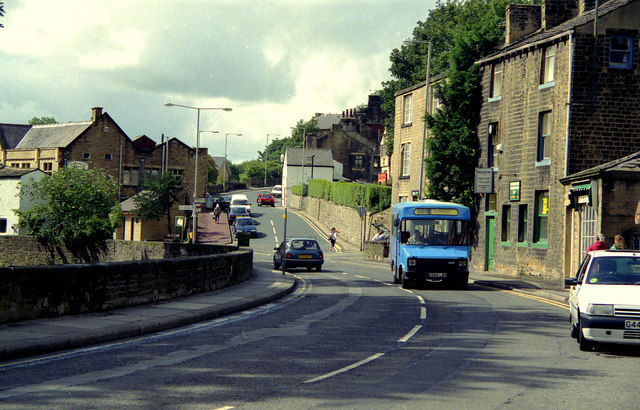
- Gisburn Road (1992)

- Shown within Pendle Borough Location within Lancashire
- Population: 6,171 (2011)
- OS grid reference: SD855395
- Civil parish: Barrowford
- District: Pendle
- Shire county: Lancashire
- Region: North West
- Country: England
- Sovereign state: United Kingdom
- Post town: NELSON
- Postcode district: BB9
- Dialling code: 01282
- Police: Lancashire
- Fire: Lancashire
- Ambulance: North West
- UK Parliament: Pendle and Clitheroe

Barrowford (/ˌbæroʊˈfɔːrd/) is a village and civil parish in the Pendle district of Lancashire, England, north of Nelson, near the Forest of Bowland Area of Outstanding Natural Beauty.

Barrowford is on the Marsden–Gisburn–Long Preston turnpike. One of the original toll houses can still be seen at the junction with the road to Colne. The toll house was restored in the 1980s and is owned by the trust which operates nearby Pendle Heritage Centre. Barrowford is about half a mile from the Leeds and Liverpool Canal, and a set of seven locks leads to the highest section of the canal between Barrowford and Barnoldswick.

About a mile on from the locks heading towards Leeds is Foulridge Tunnel known locally as the "Mile Tunnel". The packhorse bridge near Higherford Mill is the oldest in Barrowford, dating to the end of the 16th century. It formerly lay on the old main road to Gisburn, which was superseded by the Turnpike road built in 1804.

The modern Anglican church (St Thomas') was built to replace the original church of 1839, which burnt down in 1964.

The village has two rivers: Pendle Water, which flows through it, and Colne Water, which joins Pendle Water behind the site of the now demolished Samuel Holden cotton mill and flows down from the moors above Colne.

The first residential home for the deaf in Lancashire was established at Barrowford in 1929.

== History ==
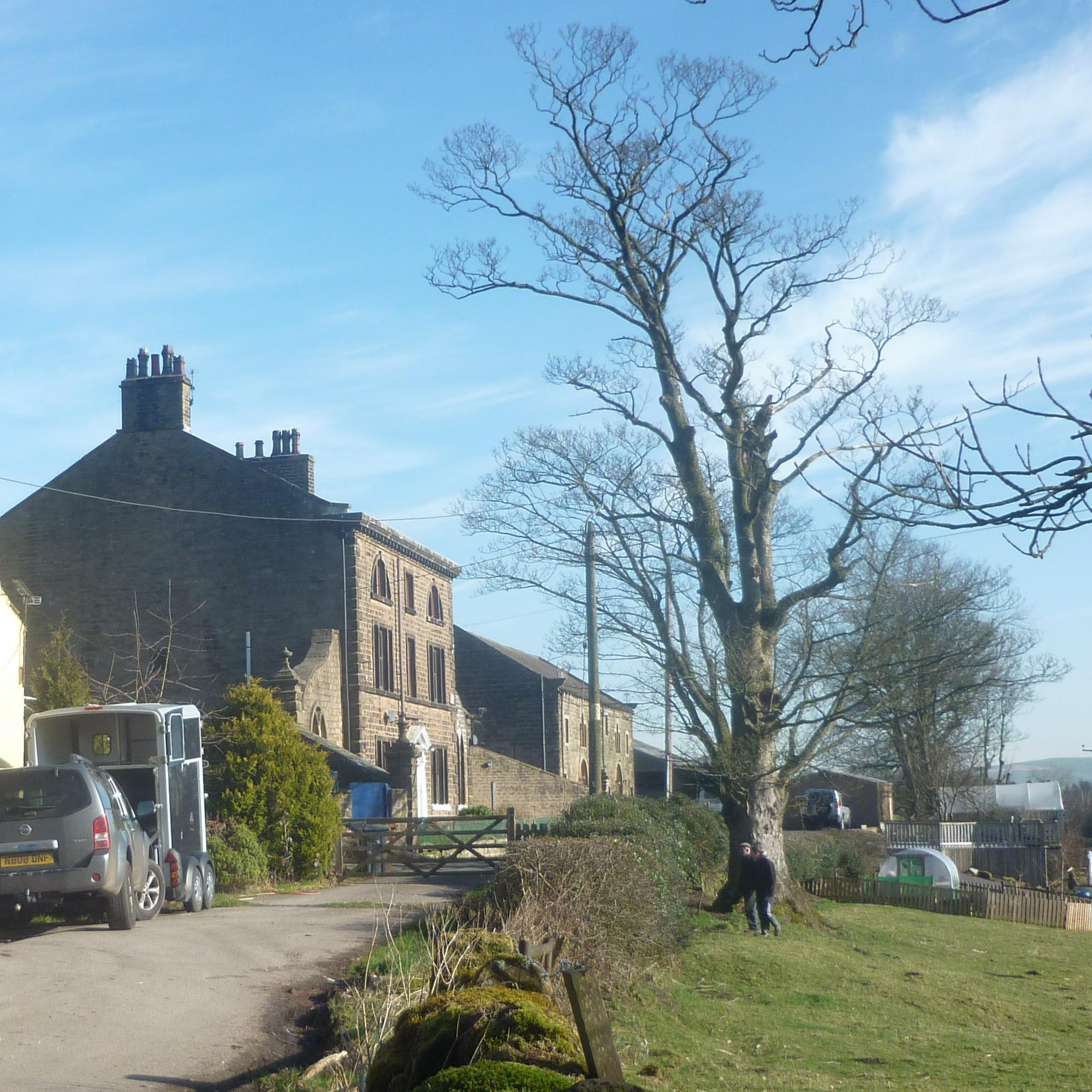
Pasture House is a listed building

Barrowford has been a centre for textile production since at least the 16th century when a fulling mill is recorded as being in the village. Until the late 18th century, the manufacture of woollen cloth was the primary industry, but in 1780 the fulling mill was rebuilt by Abraham Hargreaves as a cotton mill.

The diarist Elizabeth Shackleton documented her life here. She died in 1781 at Pasture House.

The cotton mill was powered by a water wheel and fed by water drawn off at the weir on Pendle Water. The mill reservoir is now the ornamental pond in Barrowford Park, whilst remains of the mill survive in the corner of the nearby children's playground. For the next fifty years, cotton cloth was woven in the many handloom weavers' cottages which can still be seen along the village's main road.

As power looms were introduced into the cotton industry in north east Lancashire in the 1820s, weaving gradually became a factory industry and production moved from the home to the massive weaving sheds which began to be constructed. At its peak, the industry boasted some 10,000 looms and "employed several thousand local people".

One of the last examples of a working weaving shed could be seen at the East Lancashire Towel Company, but the firm, moved to premises in Nelson, and ceased production in the United Kingdom altogether. The site of the former mill was redeveloped by Booths supermarket, which opened in November 2014.

Another weaving shed at Higherford Mill has been converted to artists' workshops. By the 1860s, the village was heavily reliant on the cotton mills for employment, and, along with the rest of Lancashire, was badly affected by the Cotton Famine during the American Civil War. The wall alongside the river opposite Barrowford Park was built during this period to provide work for unemployed weavers: the milestone, which projects from the wall, is dated 1866.

== Governance ==
Barrowford was once a township in the ancient parish of Whalley. This became a civil parish in 1866, and then in 1894 the urban areas became an urban district up until 1974. The part of Blacko parish historically in Lancashire was created from the remainder, with the exception of a small area across Pendle Water, which became part of Nelson.

The parish is split between the Barrowford and Blacko and Higherford wards of Pendle Borough Council. It is in the Pendle and Clitheroe parliamentary constituency.

== Demography ==
According to the United Kingdom Census 2011, the parish has a population of 6,171, a small increase from 6,039 in the 2001 census. The town forms part of a wider urban area, which had a population of 149,796 in 2001. A similar but larger, Burnley Built-up area defined in the 2011 census had a population of 149,422.

The racial composition of the town in 2011 was 95.3% White (93.8% White British), 3.8% Asian, 0.1% Black, 0.6% Mixed and 0.2% Other. The largest religious groups were Christian (70.2%) and Muslim (3.2%). 72.7% of adults between the ages of 16 and 74 were classed as economically active and in work.

Population of Barrowford over time
Year	1901	1911	1921	1931	1939	1951	1961	2001	2011
Population	4,959	5,527	5,527	5,299	4,833	4,766	4,644	6,039	6,171
UD (pre-1974) CP (2001 onwards)

== Media ==
The daily newspaper, Lancashire Telegraph, covers Barrowford in its Burnley, Pendle and Rossendale edition. The Nelson Leader, a weekly publication, also covers Barrowford.

== Notable people ==
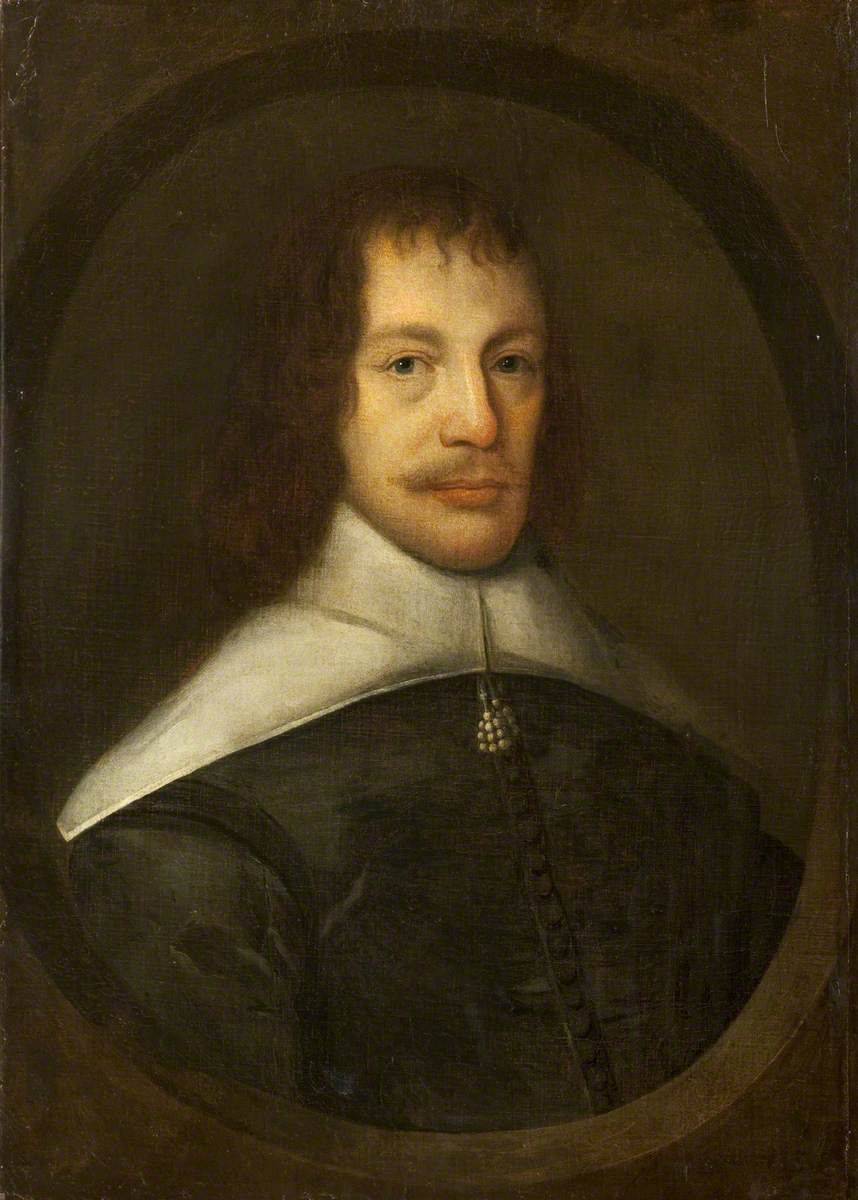
Christopher Towneley

- Christopher Towneley (1604–1674), antiquarian, called ‘the Transscriber’, researched local history & copied ancient documents.
- Elizabeth Shackleton (1726–1781), an English diarist, moved locally late in life and lived in Pasture House, where she died
- Abraham England (1867–1949), politician, businessman and soldier; Liberal National MP for Heywood and Radcliffe 1922–1931.
- Rebecca Jane (born 1984), solicitor, businesswoman, former politician and deputy leader of the UKIP, 2022 / 2024.

=== Sport ===
- Arthur Dixon (1879–1946), footballer who played 295 games starting with 175 for Burnley
- Herbie Farnworth (born 1999), rugby league footballer, played 117 games and 6 for England

== See also ==
- Listed buildings in Barrowford
