= Tony Greenwood, Baron Greenwood of Rossendale =

British Labour Party politician (1911–1982)

The Right Honourable The Lord Greenwood of Rossendale PC
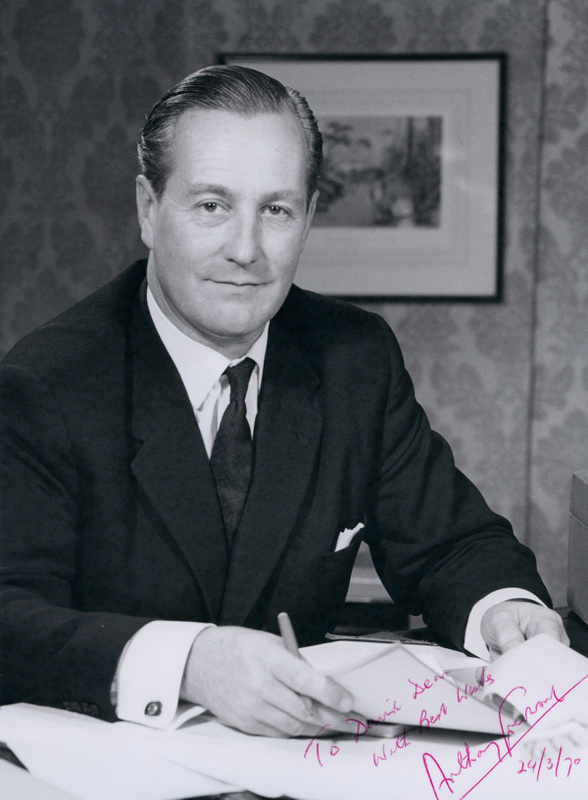

Minister of Housing and Local Government
- In office 11 August 1966 – 31 May 1970
- Prime Minister: Harold Wilson
- Preceded by: Richard Crossman
- Succeeded by: Bob Mellish

Minister of Overseas Development
- In office 23 December 1965 – 11 August 1966
- Prime Minister: Harold Wilson
- Preceded by: Barbara Castle
- Succeeded by: Arthur Bottomley

Secretary of State for the Colonies
- In office 18 October 1964 – 23 December 1965
- Prime Minister: Harold Wilson
- Preceded by: Duncan Sandys
- Succeeded by: The Earl of Longford

Chairman of the National Executive Committee
- In office 4 October 1963 – 13 December 1964
- Leader: Harold Wilson
- Preceded by: Dai Davies
- Succeeded by: Ray Gunter

Member of the House of Lords Lord Temporal
- In office 22 September 1970 – 12 April 1982; Life Peerage

Member of Parliament for Rossendale
- In office 23 February 1950 – 18 June 1970
- Preceded by: George Walker
- Succeeded by: Ronald Bray

Member of Parliament for Heywood and Radcliffe
- In office 21 February 1946 – 23 February 1950
- Preceded by: John Edmondson Whittaker
- Succeeded by: Constituency abolished

Personal details
- Born: 14 September 1911 Leeds, England
- Died: 12 April 1982 (aged 70)
- Party: Labour
- Spouse: Gillian Crawshay-Williams (m. 1940)
- Children: Susanna Catherine Crawshay Greenwood, Dinah Murray
- Parent: Arthur Greenwood (father) Catherine Ainsworth (mother)
- Education: Merchant Taylors' School, Northwood
- Alma mater: Balliol College, Oxford

Military service
- Allegiance: United Kingdom
- Branch/service: Royal Air Force
- Years of service: 1942–1945

Arthur William James Greenwood, Baron Greenwood of Rossendale, PC (14 September 1911 – 12 April 1982) was a British Labour Party politician in the 1950s and 1960s. Under the Wilson government, Greenwood served in cabinet, holding three ministerial portfolios.

== Background and education ==
The son of Arthur Greenwood (Deputy Leader of the Labour Party under Clement Attlee) and his wife Catherine Ainsworth, Greenwood was born in Leeds and educated at Merchant Taylors' School, and then read politics, philosophy and economics at Balliol College, Oxford, where he held the posts of chairman of the Labour Club and, in 1933, president of the Oxford Union. In 1933 he visited India as a member of the British Universities' Debating Team.

== Early life ==
He gained third-class honours in politics, philosophy, and economics. After that he went on a debating tour to India, but was unemployed for a while. He contemplated fighting for the Republicans in the Spanish Civil War, but in 1938–39, went to work for the National Fitness Council. At the outbreak of the World War II he joined the Ministry of Information, and served in the RAF as an intelligence officer from 1942. He later worked with the Allied Reparations Committee and attended the conference at Potsdam in 1945.

== Political career ==
Greenwood joined the Labour Party at the age of 14 and was a prospective candidate for Colchester before the war. He led the Labour group on Hampstead Borough Council from 1945 until 1949, and entered Parliament as member for Heywood and Radcliffe in a by-election in February 1946. Following boundary changes, he moved to represent Rossendale in 1950. He was vice-chairman of the Parliamentary Labour Party in 1950–51, and was in the Shadow Cabinet from 1951 to 1952 and from 1955 to 1960. He also served on the party's National Executive Committee from 1954 to 1970, and became the first Chair of Labour Friends of Israel in 1957.

Greenwood was a staunch Bevanite on the left wing of the Labour Party, he was also a staunch supporter of the Campaign for Nuclear Disarmament and participated in the Aldermaston March in 1958. He frequently challenged the party leader Hugh Gaitskell on defence policy, and in October 1960, he resigned from the shadow cabinet in protest at Gaitskell's refusal to honour the unilateralist vote at the party conference. He was the left-wing challenger to Hugh Gaitskell in the 1961 leadership election when he received the support of just over a quarter of the Labour MPs. He backed Harold Wilson for the leadership in the 1963 leadership election following the death of Gaitskell, which Wilson won, and Wilson owed him a favour for not standing himself and splitting the left-wing vote.

=== In government ===
When Labour entered government following the 1964 general election under Wilson, he served in the cabinet from 1964 to 1969, firstly as Secretary of State for the Colonies. As Colonial Secretary, he took forward the detachment of the Chagos Islands from the territory of Mauritius and the creation by Order in Council of a British Indian Ocean Territory (BIOT) to facilitate the establishment of an American military base on the island of Diego Garcia. In 1965 he was moved to become Minister of Overseas Development, and the following year he became Minister for Housing and Local Government, in which he oversaw a record 400,000 houses built during 1966-67. In October 1969 he was dropped from the cabinet when his housing ministry was placed under the expanded Department of Local Government and Regional Planning headed by Anthony Crosland.

In 1970 Wilson offered him the chairmanship of the Commonwealth Development Corporation, and Greenwood resigned from his seat in anticipation. However, Labour lost the 1970 general election and the new Conservative prime minister, Edward Heath, rescinded the appointment. This was the effective end of his front-line political career.

On 22 September 1970, Greenwood was created a life peer as Baron Greenwood of Rossendale, of East Mersea, in the County of Essex. From 1977 to 1979 he was Chairman of the House of Lords Select Committee on the European Communities and Principal Deputy Chairman of Committees.

== Business career ==
From 1970, Greenwood developed a business career, he held a number of business directorships. He was a Director of both the Britannia Building Society and the Municipal Mutual Insurance Company.

== Other public appointments ==
He also held several public service appointments, including the Greenwood Development Housing Company to build Greenwood Homes, the UK Housing Trust, the Cremation Society, the Piccadilly Advice Centre for the homeless. He also saw involvement in the British Council for the Rehabilitation of the Disabled, and the Pure Rivers Society. He was deputy lieutenant of Essex in 1974 and also pro-chancellor of the University of Lancaster.

Greenwood was a vice-president of the National Society for the Abolition of Cruel Sports.

== Personal life ==
In 1940 he married Gillian Crawshay Williams (1910–1995), They had two daughters, including the campaigner Dinah Murray.

== Death ==
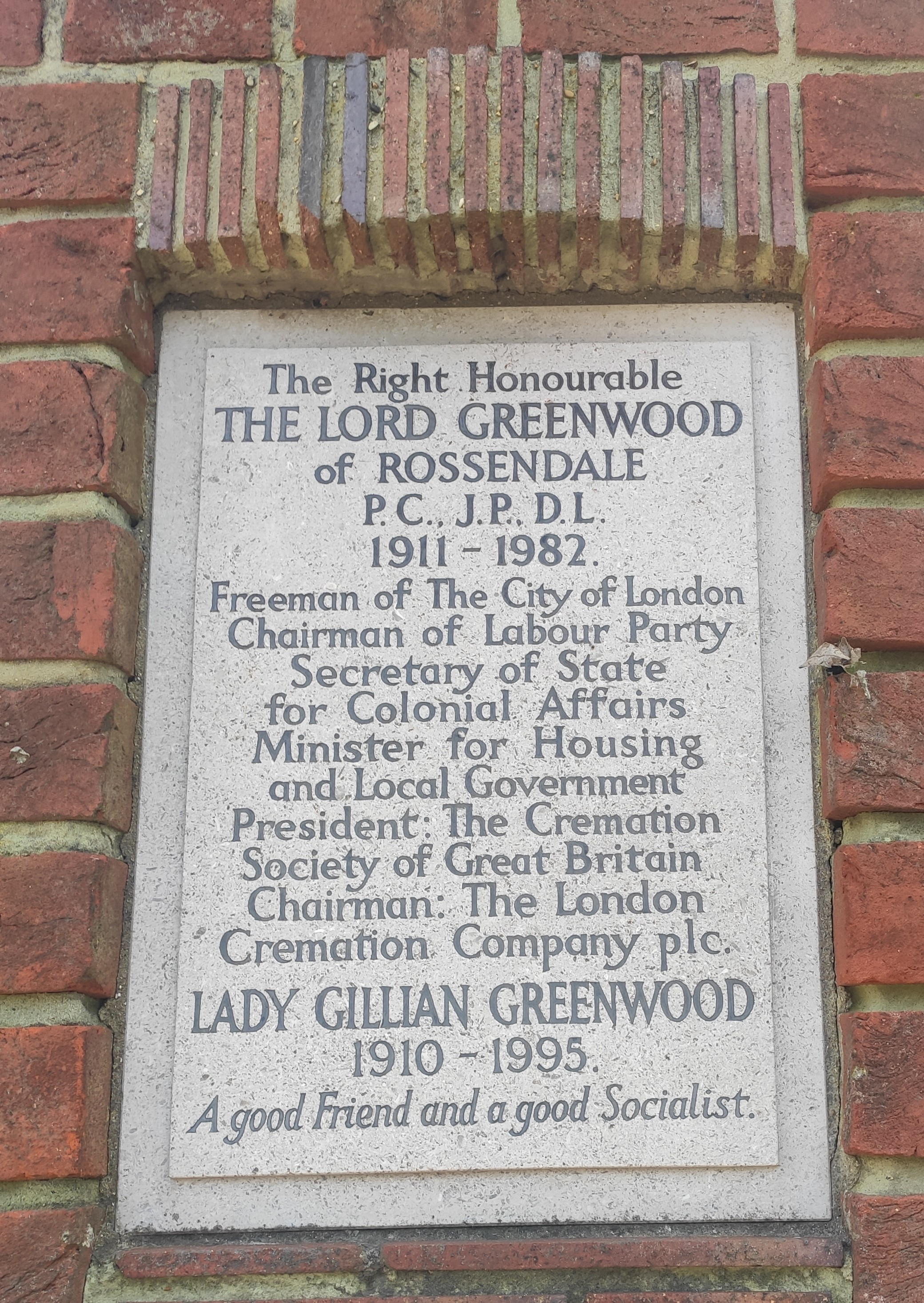
Plaque dedicated to Greenwood and his wife at Golders Green Crematorium

Greenwood died of a heart attack in 1982 on the doorstep of his home at Downshire Hill, Hampstead, at the age of 70. He was cremated at Golders Green Crematorium.

== See also ==
- Politics of the United Kingdom

Parliament of the United Kingdom
Preceded by John Edmondson Whittaker	Member of Parliament for Heywood and Radcliffe; 1946–1950	Constituency abolished see Heywood & Royton
Preceded by George Walker	Member of Parliament for Rossendale; 1950–1970	Succeeded by Ronald Bray
Political offices
Preceded by Dai Davies	Chair of the Labour Party; 1963–1964	Succeeded by Ray Gunter
Preceded by Duncan Sandys	Secretary of State for the Colonies; 1964–1965	Succeeded by The Earl of Longford
Preceded by Barbara Castle	Minister of Overseas Development; 1965–1966	Succeeded by Arthur Bottomley
Preceded by Richard Crossman	Minister of Housing and Local Government; 1966–1969	Succeeded by Office abolished
