= 1946 Heywood and Radcliffe by-election =

UK Parliamentary by-election

The 1946 Heywood and Radcliffe by-election was held on 21 February 1946. The by-election was held due to the death of the incumbent Labour MP, John Edmondson Whittaker. It was won by the Labour candidate Tony Greenwood.

Heywood and Radcliffe by-election, 1946 Electorate
Party	Candidate	Votes	%	±%
Labour	Tony Greenwood	22,238	50.5	−0.5
Conservative	Aubrey Jones	21,786	49.5	+0.5
Majority		452	1.0	−1.0
Turnout		44,024	75.6	−0.8
Labour hold		Swing	-0.5	
