= Joseph Cooksey Jackson =

British barrister and politician (1879–1938)

Joseph Cooksey Jackson KC (12 January 1879 – 26 April 1938) was a British barrister and Conservative politician. He was the Member of Parliament for Heywood and Radcliffe from 1931 to 1935.

He was educated at the Royal Grammar School, Lancaster and Clare College, Cambridge, where he graduated B.A. in 1900. He was admitted to the Middle Temple in 1908, and was called to the bar in 1909.

He defended the boxer Jackie Brown on an assault charge in 1934, with Edgar Lustgarten as his junior. In 1936 he successfully prosecuted Dr Buck Ruxton, in the infamous killings known as the Jigsaw Murders.

Parliament of the United Kingdom
| Preceded by Abraham England | Member of Parliament for Heywood and Radcliffe; 1931–1935 | Succeeded by Richard Whitaker Porritt |
