= Pendle Heritage Centre =

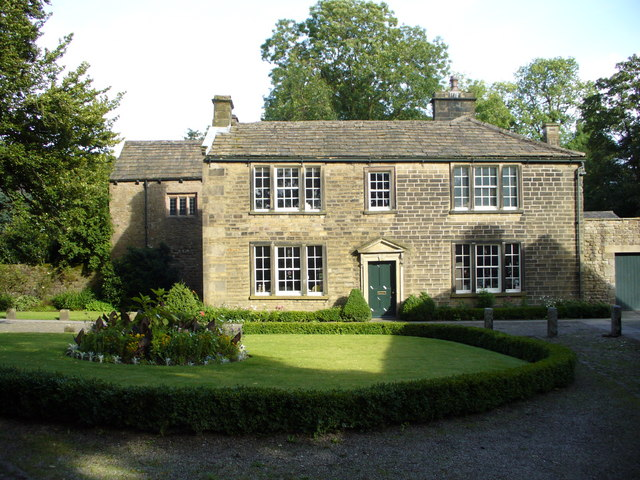

- Location within the Borough of Pendle
- Established: 1977
- Location: Barrowford, Lancashire, England
- Coordinates: 53.8535°N 2.2091°W
- Type: Museum & Art Gallery
- Visitors: 100,000+ visitors a year.
- Website: Pendle Heritage Centre

Pendle Heritage Centre is a museum and visitor centre in Barrowford, Lancashire, England, dedicated to the history and heritage of Pendle. The heritage centre occupies Park Hill, a two-storey former farmhouse which has a 1661 date stone but was developed over an extended period between the 16th century and the beginning of the 18th century. The centre has an 18th-century walled garden and woodland walk, and houses the Pendle Arts Gallery.

Park Hill is an old farmhouse that has been restored using traditional building techniques to provide visitors with an insight on how the house has been developed and adapted from the 15th century. The centre, formed in 1977, is one of the Heritage Trust for the North West's flagship projects, attracting over 100,000 visitors a year. The permanent exhibitions include the story of Park Hill as a working farm, the history of the Bannister and Swinglehurst families who occupied the house and the Pendle witches. Sir Roger Bannister is a descendant of the family that once lived here.

To commemorate the 400th anniversary of the trials of the Pendle witches, a new long-distance walking route called the Lancashire Witches Walk has been created. Ten tercet waymarkers, designed by Stephen Raw, each inscribed with a verse of a poem by Carol Ann Duffy have been installed along the route, with the first located here, to mark the start-point.

== See also ==
- Listed buildings in Barrowford
