= Rupert Crawshay-Williams =

British music critic and philosopher

- Born: 23 February 1908; London, England
- Died: 12 June 1977 (aged 69); Portmeiron, Wales
- Education: Queen's College, Oxford
- Occupations: Music critic, teacher, writer, philosopher
- Organization: Rationalist Association
- Notable work: Methods and Criteria of Reasoning: An Inquiry into the Structure of Controversy (1957)
- Movement: Humanist
- Spouse: Elizabeth Joyce Violet Powell (m. 1932)
- Parent(s): Leslie Crawshay-Williams; Joyce Collier
- Relatives: Gillian, Lady Greenwood of Rossendale (sister)

Rupert Crawshay-Williams (23 February 1908 – 12 June 1977) was a music critic, teacher, writer, and philosopher.

== Life ==
Rupert Crawshay-Williams was born in London on 23 February 1908. The son of Leslie Crawshay-Williams and Joyce Collier, he was the great-grandson of Thomas Henry Huxley. His younger sister Gillian, born in 1910, was an artist and campaigner for nuclear disarmament, who became Lady Greenwood of Rossendale. Crawshay-Williams was educated at Repton School and Queen's College, Oxford. He married Elizabeth Powell in 1932, who was later described as "a perfect companion for Rupert."

Until 1939, Crawshay-Williams worked as a music critic before relocating in 1942 to Portmeirion, North Wales, where he taught English, French, and mathematics. He remained in Wales for the rest of his life. The couple met in 1947, Bertrand Russell, was their close neighbour. In 1970, Crawshay-Williams published an affectionate biography of his friend entitled Russell Remembered. Like Russell, Crawshay-Williams was an "outspoken humanist" and an Honorary Associate of the Rationalist Press Association.

Crawshay-Williams died on 12 June 1977 alongside his wife, Elizabeth, at their home. Elizabeth, affected by paralysis and given a terminal diagnosis, and Rupert Crawshay-Williams opted to die together, swallowing a lethal dose of sleeping tablets. The Sunday Mirror reported the couple's deaths under the headline "End of a Love Story", describing how, following a quiet day at home, Crawshay-Williams wrote letters "to his friends, and to the local coroner", as well as a note left on the kitchen table and the note said, "Do not enter the bedroom --- call the doctor." Crawshay-Williams' sister, Lady Greenwood, was reported to have said "They had no children and didn't want to trouble anyone," and the Deputy Coroner said, "They were a devoted couple, and there is no evidence that they were of unsound mind." A verdict of suicide was recorded.

== Philosophy ==
Following the Second World War, Crawshay-Williams focused largely on philosophy. His first book, The Comforts of Unreason, was published in 1947. According to Michael Potter, this was "a light and witty exposé of the human inclination towards deception, self-deception in particular". Potter adds:

The Comforts of Unreason identifies and catalogues forces that lead minds astray – fallacious reasoning, euphemism, propaganda, and unacknowledged desires. Crawshay-Williams followed Russell and W. K. Clifford in emphasizing the necessity of basing beliefs on available evidence.

Crawshay-Williams' best-known work is 1957's Methods and Criteria of Reasoning (1957), in which he attempted to explain "why so many theoretical and philosophical controversies seem to be intractable" (Potter). He is best remembered today as influential in the fields of argumentation theory, rhetoric, and communications studies, and on the work of Stephen Toulmin, Lucy Olbrechts-Tyteca, and Chaim Perelman.

== Works ==
- The Comforts of Unreason: A Study of the Motives Behind Irrational Thought (1947)
- Methods and Criteria of Reasoning: An Inquiry into the Structure of Controversy (1957)
- Russell Remembered (1970)
