= Richard Porritt (politician) =

British politician (1910–1940)

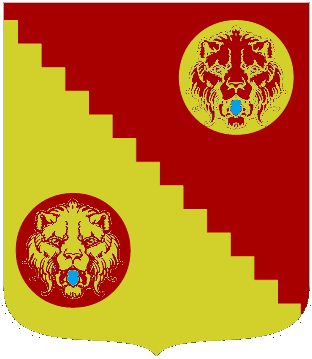
- Porritt's shield of arms as displayed in the Commons chamber

Member of Parliament for Heywood and Radcliffe
- In office 1935–1940
- Preceded by: Joseph Cooksey Jackson
- Succeeded by: James Henry Wootton-Davies

Personal details
- Born: Richard Whitaker Porritt; 4 September 1910
- Died: 26 May 1940 (aged 29) Seclin, France
- Cause of death: Killed in action
- Resting place: Seclin (De Bergault) Communal Cemetery
- Party: Conservative
- Education: Cambridge University

Military service
- Allegiance: United Kingdom
- Branch/service: British Army
- Years of service: 1931–1940
- Rank: Captain
- Unit: Lancashire Fusiliers
- Battles/wars: Second World War: French and Low Countries campaign; Battle of France †

Captain Richard Whitaker Porritt (4 September 1910 – 26 May 1940) was the Member of Parliament (MP) for Heywood and Radcliffe and became the first British MP to be killed in World War II.

Porritt was the son of Lt.-Colonel Austin Townsend Porritt, TD., DL, JP and of Annie Louise Porritt (née Law-Schofield), of Grange-over-Sands, Lancashire. He was educated at Marlborough College and Trinity College, Cambridge, where he graduated with honours. Porritt was elected to Heywood and Radcliffe seat at the age of 24 in 1935 and was one of the youngest MPs in the House of Commons. To commemorate the 1939 Canadian royal tour of King George VI and Queen Elizabeth, Porritt anonymously founded a $23,400 trust fund to aid Fairbridge schools in Canada.

Porritt was in the Officer Training Corps at Marlborough and was commissioned in the Lancashire Fusiliers regiment of the British Army in 1931 where he served in a Territorial Army unit. During World War II he served as a captain in the 1/5th Bn of the Lancashire Fusiliers and was killed in action in 1940 aged 29. He was killed in the town of Seclin, near Lille during the retreat to Dunkirk one day after the order to evacuate the Allied force from France in the wake of the German offensive. The British Army were retreating towards the Channel coast at the time trying to establish a defensive line behind which the evacuation was being progressed.

Whilst some sources claim Ronald Cartland was the first MP to be killed, official sources and others confirm that Porritt was killed four days before Cartland who was killed on 30 May 1940.

In 1983 the town of Seclin named 'Square du Captaine R.W. Porritt' in honour of him. Porritt lies nearby in the Seclin (De Bergault) Communal Cemetery.

Parliament of the United Kingdom
Preceded by Joseph Cooksey Jackson	Member of Parliament for Heywood and Radcliffe; 1935–1940	Succeeded by James Wootton-Davies
