= Quadrant (architecture) =

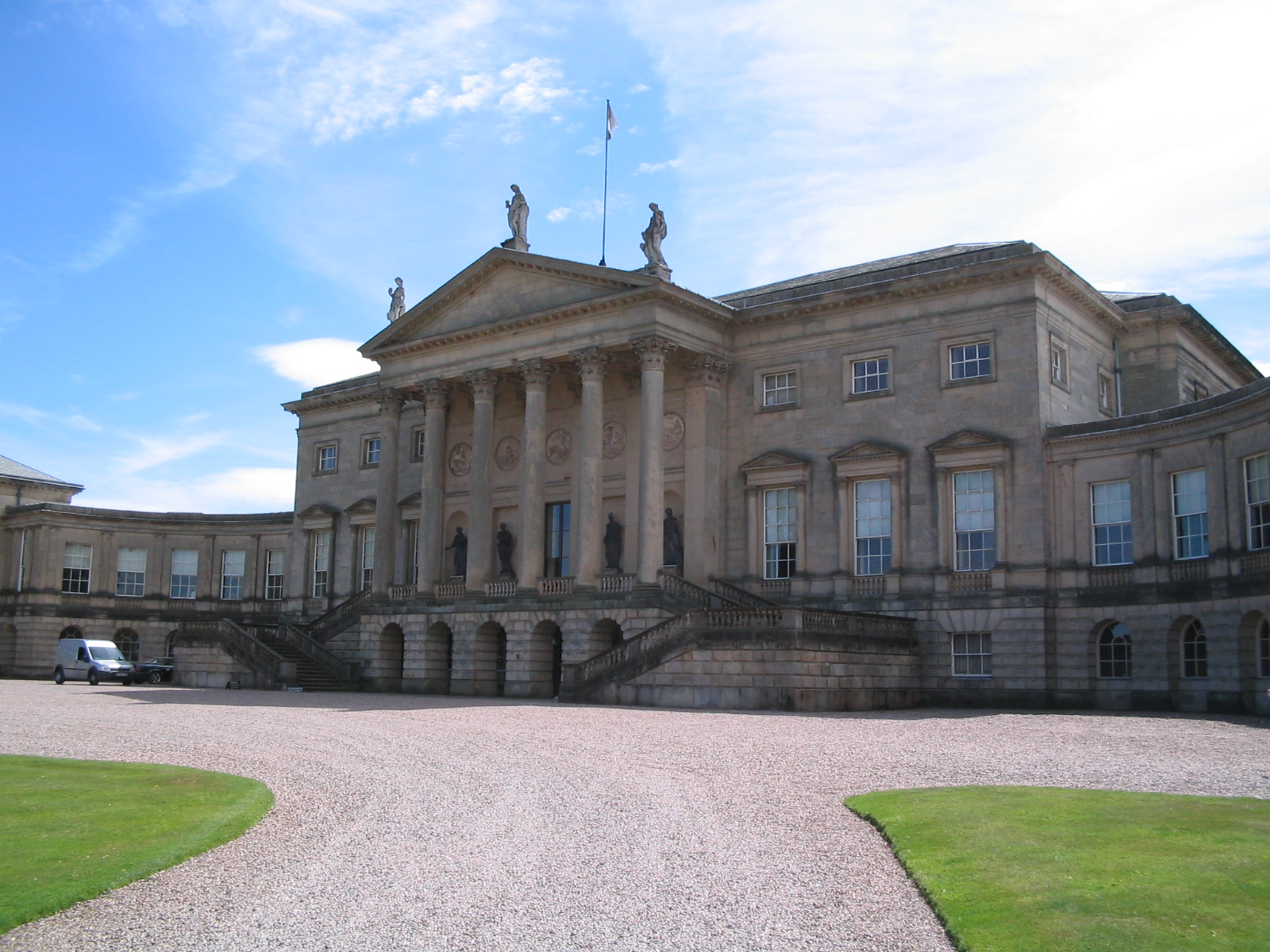
A "quadrant wing" curves to the left of the corps de logis of Kedleston Hall

Quadrant in architecture refers to a curve in a wall or a vaulted ceiling. Generally considered to be an arc of 90 degrees (one quarter of a circle), or a half of the more commonly seen architectural feature (a crescent).

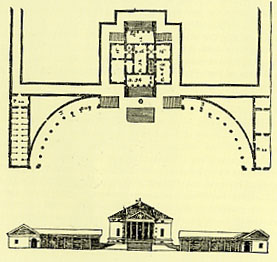
Plan by Palladio showing a design for a villa with symmetrical quadrant colonnades

The quadrant curve was a feature popularised by Andrea Palladio, who used it often for the wings and colonnades which linked his classical style villas to their service wings and outbuildings. However, curved quadrant buildings should not be confused with the canted facades of Baroque architecture or the slightly curved buildings of the era such as the Quattro Canti in Palermo.

Quadrant arches in the flying buttresses of Amiens Cathedral.

During the 18th century, the quadrant once again became a popular design shape for the terraces of smart houses in fashionable spa towns such as Buxton. Henry Currey's "Quadrant", built to rival the architecture of Bath, is considered one of Buxton's finest buildings.

== Quadrant arches ==
Quadrant arches (i.e. half arches) were a feature of Gothic architecture, where they were used in flying buttresses to support high vaults. Early quadrant arches were used to carry the aisle roofs in the early 12th century nave of Durham Cathedral.
