= James Wootton-Davies =

James Henry Wootton-Davies (1884–1964) was Conservative Party MP for Heywood and Radcliffe in Lancashire.

When his predecessor died in 1940 this led to a by-election, and because of the wartime truce he was returned unopposed. He lost the seat to Labour at the 1945 general election.

He was the chief chemist at Lunts of Port Sunlight near Liverpool. He changed his name from Davies to Wootton-Davies after marrying Gertrude Mabel Wotton (who added an extra o in Wotton because she felt it was too common) thus becoming Wootton-Davies. She was known as Shirley, her chosen name when working as a model for Norman Hartnel

He lived in Starlings Castle, Bronygarth, then moved to Bronwilfa Hall near Wrexham where James Henry died in 1964.

James Henry owned a farm called Gilar near Pentrefoelas which he gave to his son James William Wootton-Davies as a wedding present, in 1961.

Parliament of the United Kingdom
Preceded by Richard Porritt	Member of Parliament for Heywood and Radcliffe; 1940–1945	Succeeded by John Whittaker
