= Abraham England =

British politician

Member of Parliament for Heywood and Radcliffe
- In office 1922–1931
- Preceded by: Walter Halls
- Succeeded by: Joseph Cooksey Jackson

Personal details
- Born: 3 January 1867 Barrowford, Lancashire, England
- Died: 4 January 1949 (aged 82) Southport, Lancashire, England
- Party: Liberal

Abraham England CMG DSO (3 January 1867 – 4 January 1949) was a British Liberal politician, businessman, and soldier.

== Early life ==
Abraham England was born at Barrowford, near Nelson in Lancashire and pursued a business career in Manchester. He joined the Territorial Force as a volunteer and during the First World War he served in Egypt, Gallipoli, France, and Belgium. He was mentioned three times in dispatches and was awarded the Distinguished Service Order in 1918 and was made a CMG two years later. In 1922, he commanded the East Lancashire Divisional Train, Royal Army Service Corps and was honorary Colonel of the formation from 1923 to 1933.

== Entry into politics ==
In 1921, the Coalition Liberal-held seat at Heywood and Radcliffe fell vacant as the sitting MP, Albert Illingworth went to the House of Lords. England was adopted as Coalition Liberal candidate and faced a three-cornered contest with Labour and an Independent Liberal supported by H H Asquith. There was doubt at first as to whether the Asquithian Liberals would put up a candidate, as many Liberals in the northwest were anxious to avoid the wounds of an open clash with the Lloyd George coalition Liberals. All three candidates professed to be supporters of Free Trade, so for the coalition campaign, the main election issue was the avoidance of class war and Lloyd George emphasised this in his public letter of support to England. In his election address, England said the issue was whether the country wished to submit to will of an extremist minority. Notwithstanding this attack, the result was a Labour gain, albeit by the narrow majority of 305 votes. The successful candidate, Walter Halls of Nottingham, was said to have profited from the breakdown of talks in Manchester over wages in the cotton trade, which threatened the employment and livelihoods of many of the local people. Halls received 13,430 votes to England's 13,125. The Independent Liberal received 5,671.

== Parliamentary career ==
England did not give up on his political career however, nor did he desert Heywood. He stood again at the 1922 general election as a National Liberal (indicating his continued support for Lloyd George), but attracting no Conservative or other Liberal opponent, beating Halls. In return, England voted with the Conservative government much more often than against it in the 1922–23 Parliament, prompting one historian to describe him as a Conservative in all but name. He stood in 1923 as a plain Liberal, again without Conservative opposition and again defeated Walter Halls. England was one of ten Liberal MPs who defied the party whip and voted against putting Labour into office following the outcome of the 1923 election and during the period of the first Labour government, England voted with the Conservatives on a number of issues. In October 1924, the Heywood and Radcliffe Conservatives announced they would be supporting England at the forthcoming general election. He stood at this election under the Constitutionalist label, but after the election, re-took the Liberal whip. During the Liberal turmoil which followed the formation of the National Government in August 1931 and the split in the party over whether to continue giving it support which occurred in October that year, England was on the side of the National Liberals led by Sir John Simon. Despite his support for the National Government, however, the Tories determined to fight Heywood and Radcliffe themselves at the 1931 general election. In the face of this, England reluctantly stood down to prevent the splitting of the National vote and to avoid the risk of defeat.

== National Liberal ==
Outside Parliament he continued to support the Simonite Liberals and in 1932, he became a founder member of the National Liberal Council, the body set up to support the Liberal National group in the House of Commons. This group came increasingly to be associated with the Conservatives. It changed its name to the National Liberal Party in 1948 and eventually merged with the Tories in 1968. In 1934, despite his Liberal National affiliations (and a supporter of tariffs), England was elected president of the Manchester Reform Club.

== Marriage and death ==
In 1895, England married Lucy Dunkerley. He died at his home near Southport aged 81.

Parliament of the United Kingdom
Preceded by Walter Halls	Member of Parliament for Heywood and Radcliffe; 1922–1931	Succeeded by Joseph Cooksey Jackson
