= John Edmondson Whittaker =

British politician (1897–1945)

John Edmondson Whittaker (1897 – c.9 December 1945) was a Labour Party politician in the United Kingdom.

John Whittaker was born in Burnley in 1897. After working as a weaver in a cotton mill as a boy, Whittaker was educated at Burnley Municipal College and Sarisbury Court Church of England Teachers' Training College, Hampshire. He fought in the First World War.

In 1921 he married Alice, daughter of Frank Marshall, and they had a daughter, the later mother of Campino, the lead vocalist of the German punk rock band Die Toten Hosen.

He was headmaster of Rosegrove County Modern School, Burnley until his election as Member of Parliament for Heywood and Radcliffe at the 1945 general election, when he defeated the sitting Conservative MP, James Henry Wootton-Davies, by 892 votes. During his adult life he visited Russia twice, and broadcast on radio on the subject.

After being elected to Parliament Whittaker suffered bouts of ill-health, first influenza after which he returned to his parliamentary duties against doctor's orders, then collapsing in Manchester. On 7 December 1945, he told his wife he was going for a walk. His body was discovered two days later with throat wounds at Crown Point, a remote moorland spot near Burnley, by a group of boys who had gone for a walk. He had died by suicide.

== See also ==
- List of United Kingdom MPs with the shortest service

Parliament of the United Kingdom
Preceded by James Wootton-Davies	Member of Parliament for Heywood and Radcliffe; 1945–1945	Succeeded by Tony Greenwood
