= Heywood and Radcliffe =

Parliamentary constituency in the United Kingdom, 1918–1950

- Former county constituency for the House of Commons

1918–1950
- Seats: one
- Created from: Heywood, Bury, Bolton, and Radcliffe-cum-Farnworth
- Replaced by: Heywood and Royton, Bury and Radcliffe, Middleton and Prestwich, and Rossendale

Heywood and Radcliffe was a county constituency centred on the towns of Heywood and Radcliffe in South Lancashire. It returned one Member of Parliament (MP) to the House of Commons of the Parliament of the United Kingdom, elected by the first past the post system.

== History ==
Under the Representation of the People Act 1918, the constituency was created by merging the Heywood constituency and part of the Radcliffe-cum-Farnworth constituency for the 1918 general election. It was abolished for the 1950 general election.

== Members of Parliament ==
Election	Member	Party
1918	Albert Illingworth	Coalition Liberal
1921 by-election	Walter Halls	Labour
1922	Abraham England	National Liberal
Nov 1923	Abraham England	Liberal
Sep 1931	Abraham England	Liberal National
Oct 1931	Joseph Jackson	Conservative
1935	Richard Porritt	Conservative
1940 by-election	James Wootton-Davies	Conservative
1945	John Whittaker	Labour
1946 by-election	Tony Greenwood	Labour
1950	constituency abolished: see Heywood and Royton & Bury and Radcliffe	

== Elections ==
=== Elections in the 1910s ===
Illingworth

General election 1918: Heywood and Radcliffe
Party		Candidate	Votes	%
C	Coalition Liberal	Albert Illingworth	14,250	67.6
	Labour	Horace Nobbs	6,827	32.4
Majority			7,423	35.2
Turnout			21,077	52.2
Registered electors			40,383	
	National Liberal win (new seat)			
C indicates candidate endorsed by the coalition government.

=== Elections in the 1920s ===
1921 Heywood and Radcliffe by-election
Party	Candidate	Votes	%	±%
Labour	Walter Halls	13,430	41.7	+9.3
National Liberal	Abraham England	13,125	40.7	−26.9
Liberal	Cornelius Pickstone	5,671	17.6	New
Majority		305	1.0	N/A
Turnout		32,226	80.9	+28.7
Registered electors		39,856		
Labour gain from National Liberal		Swing	+18.1	

General election 1922: Heywood and Radcliffe
Party	Candidate	Votes	%	±%
National Liberal	Abraham England	19,016	55.4	−12.2
Labour	Walter Halls	15,334	44.6	+12.2
Majority		3,682	10.8	−24.4
Turnout		34,350	83.8	+31.6
Registered electors		40,968		
National Liberal hold		Swing	−12.2	

General election 1923: Heywood and Radcliffe
Party	Candidate	Votes	%	±%
Liberal	Abraham England	17,163	52.9	−2.5
Labour	Walter Halls	15,273	47.1	+2.5
Majority		1,890	5.8	−5.0
Turnout		32,436	78.3	−5.5
Registered electors		41,430		
Liberal hold		Swing	−2.5	

General election 1924: Heywood and Radcliffe
Party	Candidate	Votes	%	±%
Constitutionalist (Liberal)	Abraham England	19,131	55.6	+2.7
Labour	Alexander Walkden	15,307	44.4	−2.7
Majority		3,824	11.2	+5.4
Turnout		22,955	81.0	+2.7
Registered electors		42,529		
Constitutionalist hold		Swing	+2.7	

General election 1929: Heywood and Radcliffe
Party	Candidate	Votes	%	±%
Liberal	Abraham England	22,692	52.2	−3.4
Labour	Arthur Creech Jones	20,745	47.8	+3.4
Majority		1,947	4.4	−6.8
Turnout		43,437	79.3	−1.7
Registered electors		54,757		
Liberal hold		Swing	−3.4	

=== Elections in the 1930s ===
General election 1931: Heywood and Radcliffe
Party	Candidate	Votes	%	±%
Conservative	Joseph Jackson	32,429	71.5	New
Labour	James Stott	12,915	28.5	−19.3
Majority		19,514	43.0	N/A
Turnout		45,344	80.7	+1.4
Conservative gain from Liberal		Swing		

General election 1935: Heywood and Radcliffe
Party	Candidate	Votes	%	±%
Conservative	Richard Porritt	27,226	60.5	−11.0
Labour	Tom McLean	17,799	39.5	+11.0
Majority		9,427	21.0	−22.0
Turnout		45,025	78.2	−2.5
Conservative hold		Swing	-11.0	

General Election 1939–40

Another General Election was required to take place before the end of 1940. The political parties had been making preparations for an election to take place and by the Autumn of 1939, the following candidates had been selected;

- Conservative:
- Labour: A Gaskell

=== Elections in the 1940s ===
1940 Heywood and Radcliffe by-election
Party	Candidate	Votes	%	±%
Conservative	James Wootton-Davies	Unopposed	N/A	N/A
Conservative hold				

General election 1945: Heywood and Radcliffe
Party	Candidate	Votes	%	±%
Labour	John Edmondson Whittaker	22,601	51.0	+10.5
Conservative	James Wootton-Davies	21,709	49.0	−10.5
Majority		892	2.0	N/A
Turnout		44,310	76.4	−1.8
Labour gain from Conservative		Swing		

1946 Heywood and Radcliffe by-election
Party	Candidate	Votes	%	±%
Labour	Tony Greenwood	22,238	50.5	−0.5
Conservative	Aubrey Jones	21,786	49.5	+0.5
Majority		452	1.0	−1.0
Turnout		44,024	75.6	−0.8
Labour hold		Swing	-0.5	
