= 2018 in the United Kingdom =

Events from the year 2018 in the United Kingdom.

== Incumbents ==
- Monarch – Elizabeth II
- Prime Minister – Theresa May (Conservative)

== Events ==
=== January ===
- 2 January – Rail passengers face their biggest price increase for five years, with average tickets rising in cost by 3.4%.
- 2–4 January – Storm Eleanor causes widespread disruption across the UK, with flooding and gusts of wind reaching 100 mph (161 km/h).
- 3 January – The NHS in England cancels all non-urgent treatments from mid-January until the end of the month, as reports emerge of patients facing long waits for treatment and being stuck on trolleys in corridors and of ambulances left queuing outside Accident & Emergency departments.
- 5 January – Jon Venables, one of the killers of toddler James Bulger in 1993, is charged with possessing indecent images of children.
- 8 January – Theresa May announces a Cabinet reshuffle.
- 9 January
  - The manufacture of cosmetics and personal care products with plastic microbeads is banned in England, with a ban on their sale due to come into force by July 2018.
  - Virgin Trains announces it has stopped selling copies of the Daily Mail on its West Coast trains following "considerable concern [about] the Mail's editorial position on issues such as immigration, LGBT rights and unemployment".
- 11 January – Theresa May pledges to eradicate all "avoidable" plastic waste throughout the UK by 2042.
- 12 January – US President Donald Trump scraps a planned visit to the UK, blaming his predecessor, Barack Obama, for a "bad deal" on the new embassy due to be opened in London, despite the fact it was agreed under the administration of George W. Bush.
- 15 January – Carillion, the UK's second-largest construction company, goes into liquidation with debts of £1,500,000,000.
- 16 January – Supermarket chain Iceland announces that it aims to end the use of plastic for its own-brand products by the end of 2023.
- 17 January
  - French President Emmanuel Macron agrees to loan the Bayeux Tapestry to the United Kingdom after 2020; the first time in 950 years it will leave France.
  - By 317 to 299 votes, the Conservatives reject a Labour amendment to keep the Charter of Fundamental Rights of the European Union.
- 18 January – Scotland Yard says that American actor Kevin Spacey is being investigated over a third accusation of sexual assault, dating from 2005.
- 21 January – The UK Independence Party's National Executive Committee (NEC) delivers a vote of no confidence in its leader, Henry Bolton, following a recent controversy involving his girlfriend.
- 23 January – Rupert Murdoch’s £11,700,000,000 bid to take full control of Sky is provisionally blocked by the Competition and Markets Authority (CMA).
- 24 January – Sir Elton John announces that he is to retire from touring after nearly fifty years.
- 25 January
  - Industry body Water UK announces that all shops, cafés, and businesses in England will provide free water refill points in every major city and town by 2021.
  - The number of rough sleepers in England reaches its highest level since records began – an estimated 4,751.
- 30 January – A leaked government paper shows that Brexit will damage the UK economy no matter what kind of deal is agreed, with up to 8% of GDP growth lost within fifteen years.
- 31 January – First Home Office record of migrants landing irregularly in the UK by small boat, seven people in a single boat; small numbers have crossed previously.

=== February ===
- 2 February – Finsbury Park Mosque attacker Darren Osborne, who drove a van into a group of Muslims, is jailed for life, with a minimum term of 43 years.
- 3 February – British YouTuber KSI defeats fellow British YouTuber Joe Weller in 3 rounds in a YouTube boxing match at the Copper Box Arena. The event is viewed by up to 1.6 million people on live streams.
- 7 February
  - The chief constable of Police Scotland, Phil Gormley, resigns amid a series of investigations into claims of gross misconduct.
  - Jon Venables, one of the killers of toddler James Bulger, is jailed for possessing child abuse images for a second time.
- 8 February – NHS hospitals in England record their worst ever Accident & Emergency performance, with only 77.1% of patients treated within four hours in January, far short of the 95% target.
- 9 February
  - Trinity Mirror, publisher of the traditionally Labour-supporting Daily Mirror, purchases Northern & Shell, chaired by Richard Desmond, publisher of the traditionally Conservative-supporting Daily Express, for £126,700,000, soon afterwards changing the group name to Reach.
  - An investigation by The Times newspaper finds that Oxfam covered up the use of prostitutes by senior aid workers overseas.
- 17 February
  - An earthquake of magnitude 4.4 and depth of 7.4 km hits South Wales, the biggest in the UK since the 2008 Lincolnshire earthquake. The effects are felt as far away as Liverpool, Birmingham and Cornwall.
  - UKIP members vote to dismiss party leader Henry Bolton after controversy over racist text messages sent by his partner.
- 21 February – The National Farmers Union elects Minette Batters, the first female president in its 110-year history.
- 22 February – The 2018 UK higher education strike begins with academic staff at sixty-four UK universities over proposed changes to the USS pension scheme.
- 27 February
  - US cable TV giant Comcast makes a £22,100,000,000 bid for Sky, challenging an existing offer from 21st Century Fox.
  - The Labour Party appoints transgender model Munroe Bergdorf as an LGBT adviser to Shadow Secretary of State for Women and Equalities Dawn Butler.
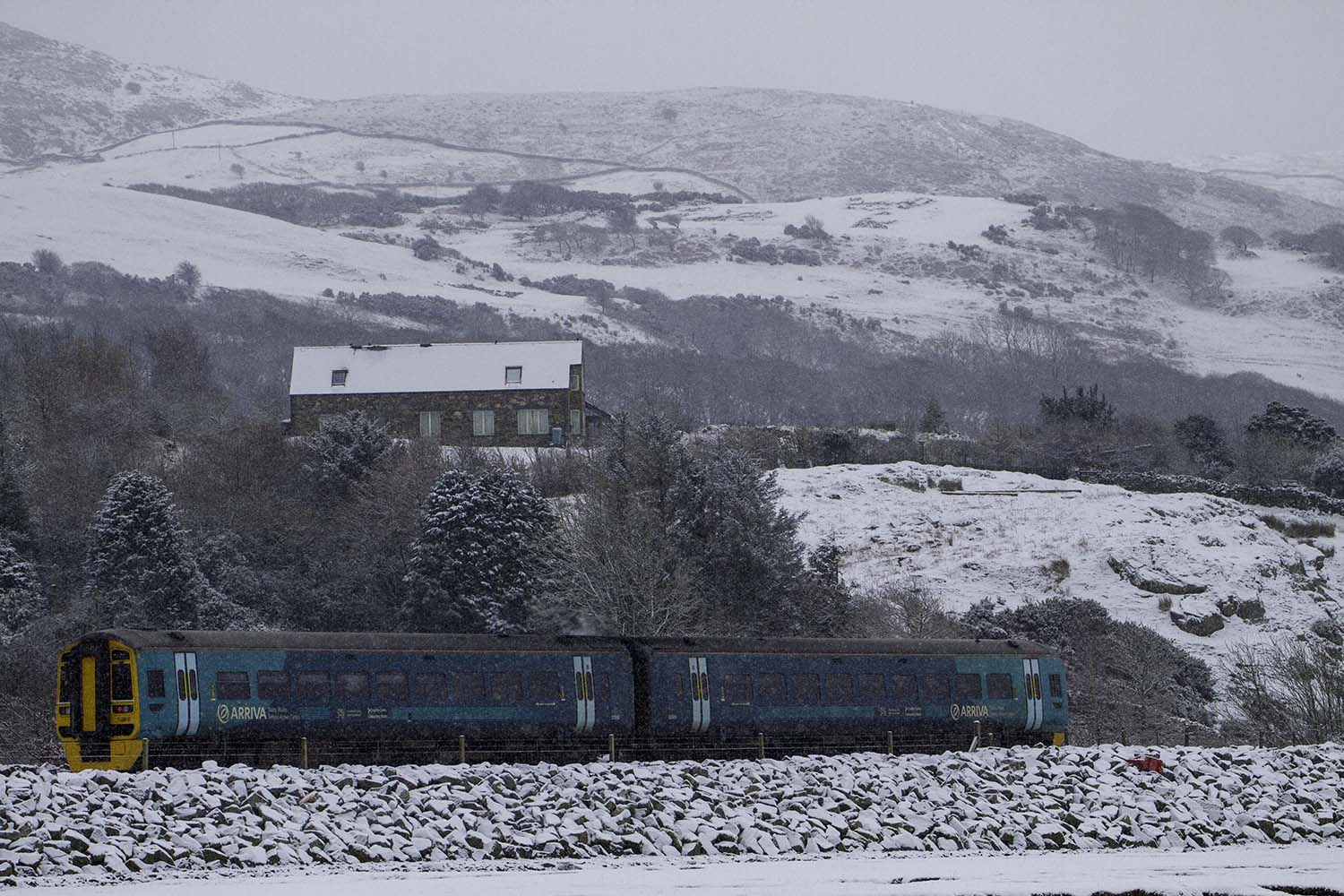
- Snow in a rural part of North Wales
  27 February–4 March – Heavy snow causes disruption across much of the UK. Over subsequent days the Met Office issues the first ever red snow warning for Scotland, South West England and South Wales, meaning the weather poses a potential risk to life. With ten severe weather warnings in place, the Army is called in to help rescue hundreds of stranded motorists. Several people are reported to have died in circumstances related to the freezing conditions. As temperatures later begin rising and ice thaws, the Environment Agency issues weather warnings due to flooding, mainly in the South-West and North-East England.
- 28 February
  - The UK's largest toy retailer, Toys "R" Us, goes into administration with a £15,000,000 VAT bill it is unable to pay.
  - One of the UK's biggest electronics retailers, Maplin, goes into administration after talks with potential buyers fail to secure a sale.
  - An earthquake of magnitude 3.2 and depth of 4 km hits Mosser, Cumbria. It is felt in Grasmere, Kendal, Cockermouth and Keswick and is the second earthquake to hit the United Kingdom within two weeks.

=== March ===
- 1 March
  - Paper £10 notes featuring Charles Darwin cease to be legal tender in the UK.
  - Former Mayor of London, Ken Livingstone, is suspended from the Labour Party indefinitely, amid claims of anti-semitism.
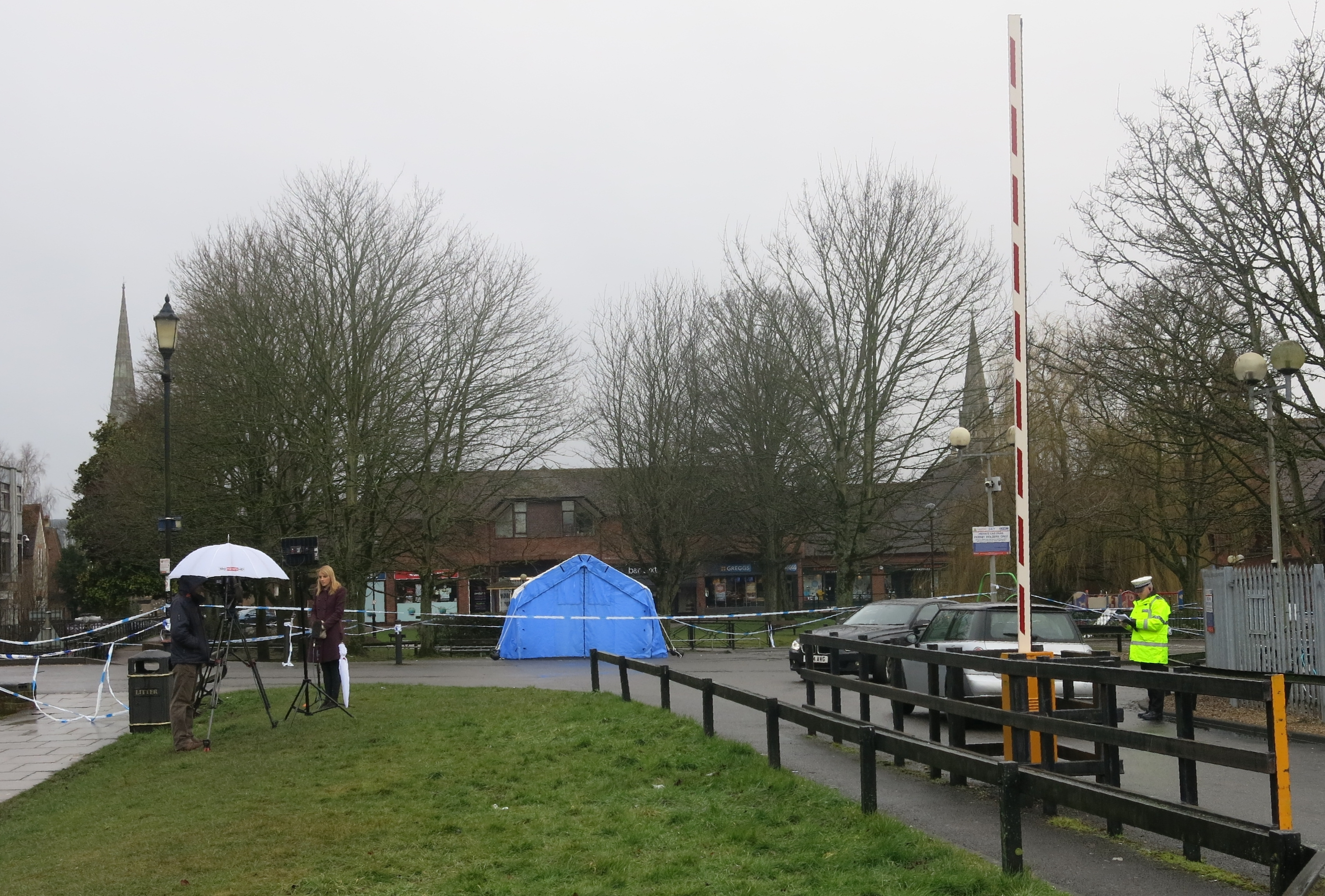
- Police forensics tent in the cordoned of area of Salisbury following the poisonings
  4 March – Former Russian double agent Sergei Skripal and daughter Yulia are poisoned with a publicly unidentified nerve agent in Salisbury. They are brought to hospital in critical condition, along with a police officer who was first on the scene. Counter-terrorism police investigate amid speculation the Kremlin was behind the incident.
- 5 March
  - After the recent cold spell, homes across the UK have water supply problems and thousands of people in Wales and South-East England are urged to use as little as possible.
  - A Sinn Féin delegation meets the EU's chief negotiator Michel Barnier in Brussels about the border between Northern Ireland and the Republic of Ireland due to Brexit.
  - The sale of energy drinks to under-sixteens is banned by most UK supermarkets due to high levels of sugar and caffeine.
- 6 March – Ex-UKIP leader Henry Bolton announces he will create a new political party called "OneNation" that would "campaign unceasingly for our full independence from the EU", and "mirror some of the changes that I sought to bring to UKIP". He registers a party as Our Nation on 31 November; this survives for one year.
- 7 March
  - Saudi Arabian Crown Prince Mohammed bin Salman starts a three-day visit to the UK, amid protest concerns from Prime Minister Theresa May.
  - Carbon emissions in the UK fall to the level last seen in 1890.
  - The EU rejects Theresa May's proposal for "mutual recognition" of standards between the UK and EU as part of a post-Brexit trade relationship, while also ruling out British membership of EU regulators such as the European Medicines Agency after Brexit.
- 11 March – Following the events of 4 March, up to 500 pub-goers and diners in Salisbury are told to wash possessions after traces of a nerve agent are found.
- 12 March
  - The government confirms that internet pornography age checks will be delayed and will no longer be introduced in April.
  - Meghan Markle, Prince Harry's fiancée, joins the Queen for her first official event, at a service to mark Commonwealth Day.
- 13 March
  - The government's fiscal statement, which is now called the Spring Statement, is published.
  - Russian exile Nikolai Glushkov is found dead at his London home. Police launch a murder investigation three days later.
- 14 March
  - Stephen Hawking, world-renowned theoretical physicist, author, and cosmologist, dies at his home in Cambridge, aged 76.
  - It is reported that all "Toys "R" Us" stores in the UK will close within six weeks following the chain's collapse into administration in February and its failure to find a buyer.
  - The government calls for an urgent meeting of the UN Security Council to discuss the poisoning of Sergei Skripal and Yulia Skripal on 4 March. Theresa May announces that 23 Russian diplomats will be expelled from the UK after Russia fails to respond to claims of involvement.
- 15 March
  - Following the events of 4 March, Theresa May visits Salisbury. In a joint statement, the leaders of the UK, US, France, and Germany say the ex-spy poisoning was the first offensive use of a nerve agent in Europe since the Second World War, and that Russian involvement is the "only plausible explanation".
  - The Space Industry Act 2018 becomes law, giving UK spaceports the legal framework to function.
- 17–19 March – Heavy snow affects much of the UK. It is dubbed the "mini beast from the east"; a sequel to the previous cold wave at the start of the month. On 17 March, amber weather warnings are issued for North-West England, Yorkshire, the Midlands, London and South-East England. On 18 March, they are issued for South-West England, South-East England, mid-Wales and the West Midlands. Dozens of vehicles are stuck overnight on the A30 in Devon whilst two weather warnings remain still in place for much of the UK after wintry showers disrupt many parts of the country.
- 18–19 March – Foreign Secretary Boris Johnson dismisses claims from Russian EU ambassador, Vladimir Chizhov, who said that Porton Down may have been the source of the nerve agent. It is reported that experts from the Organisation for the Prohibition of Chemical Weapons will arrive on 19 March to test samples of the substance.
- 19 March
  - The Gambling Commission recommends that fixed odds betting terminal payouts should be cut to £30 or less from £100.
  - David Davis meets Michel Barnier in Brussels to finalise details of the Brexit transition period after March 2019.
  - Channel 4 airs a documentary about Cambridge Analytica, the data analysis company that worked on the successful Leave.EU campaign advocating British withdrawal from the EU, and for Donald Trump's 2016 presidential campaign. Undercover reporters, talking to executives from the firm, discover the use of bribes, honey traps, fake news campaigns, and operations with ex-spies to swing election campaigns around the world. An emergency court order is requested to raid the Cambridge Analytica offices.
- 20 March – Facebook founder Mark Zuckerberg receives a formal request from the UK Government to answer questions regarding Cambridge Analytica and the "catastrophic failure of process" behind the data breach. The board of Cambridge Analytica suspends CEO Alexander Nix with immediate effect, pending a full and independent investigation.
- 21 March – Following eight years of the austerity programme, a pay rise is agreed for 1,300,000 NHS staff, with minimum increases of at least 6.5% over three years and some people getting as much as 29%.
- 22 March – The Bank of England keeps UK interest rates at 0.5%, but hints that it will raise them to 0.75% in May.
- 23 March
  - Ahmed Hassan, perpetrator of the Parsons Green bombing, is sentenced to life in prison with a minimum term of 34 years.
  - Labour Party leader Jeremy Corbyn dismisses Owen Smith from the Shadow Cabinet, for calling for a second EU referendum contrary to official Labour Party position. Smith is replaced by Tony Lloyd.
- 24 March – Plaid Cymru announces that if elected, they will hold an independence referendum for Wales by 2030.
- 25 March – The first scheduled direct flight from Australia to the UK — Qantas Flight QF9 from Perth — lands at London's Heathrow Airport after a seventeen-hour flight and 9,009 miles in the air.
- 28 March
  - The UK Government proposes that consumers in England will pay a deposit when they buy drinks bottles and cans in a bid to boost recycling and cut waste, but consumers will get the money back if they return the container.
  - General Sir Nicholas Carter is named as the new Chief of the Defence Staff.
- 31 March – The government receives a request from the Russian Embassy to visit Yulia Skripal in hospital after the poisoning on 4 March.

=== April ===
- 1 April
  - All privately rented properties in England and Wales are required to have a minimum energy performance rating of "E".
  - The National Living Wage for people over 25 increases from £7.50 to £7.83 an hour. Workers between the ages of 21–24 receive an hourly pay rise from £7.05 to £7.38, wages rise from £5.60 to £5.90 for 18–20-year-olds, from £4.05 to £4.20 for 16–17-year-olds and £3.50 to £3.70 for apprentices aged under 19 or in the first year of their apprenticeship.
- 2 April – The Director of Public Prosecutions in England and Wales, Alison Saunders, announces that she will step down after her contract ends in October.
- 3 April
  - Michael Gove announces that the sale of ivory of any age, with limited exceptions, will be the toughest ban in the world to reduce elephant poaching.
  - London's murder rate surpasses that of New York City.
- 5 April – All firms with at least 250 employees are required to publish data about their pay differences between men and women.
- 6 April – The sugary drinks tax comes into force throughout the UK.
- 11 April – A £70,000,000 plan to extend Birmingham's Alexander Stadium is announced for the 2022 Commonwealth Games and confirmed by Theresa May on a visit to the city.
- 13 April – The London Stock Exchange announces David Schwimmer as its new chief executive, to be appointed on 1 August to replace Xavier Rolet who quit the role the previous November.
- 14 April – The UK, France and United States order the bombing of Syrian military bases, in response to a sarin chemical attack allegedly by the Bashar al-Assad regime on civilians in Ghouta.
- 17 April – Theresa May apologises to Caribbean leaders at Downing Street over the Windrush generation controversy.
- 18 April – Theresa May suffers two defeats in the House of Lords on her flagship Brexit legislation. In the first, the Lords vote by 348 to 225 to force negotiation of a Customs Union between the EU and the UK. In the second, the Lords vote by 314 to 217 on an amendment limiting the ability of ministers to use secondary legislation to water down existing EU rights when those rights get transferred to UK law.
- 19 April
  - Theresa May proposes a ban on plastic straws and cotton buds in England.
  - The UK experiences its hottest day in April since 1949, with temperatures of 28.5 °C (83.3 °F) recorded in Central London.
- 20 April – Commonwealth leaders announce that the Prince of Wales (on becoming Charles III) would succeed Elizabeth II as Head of the Commonwealth.
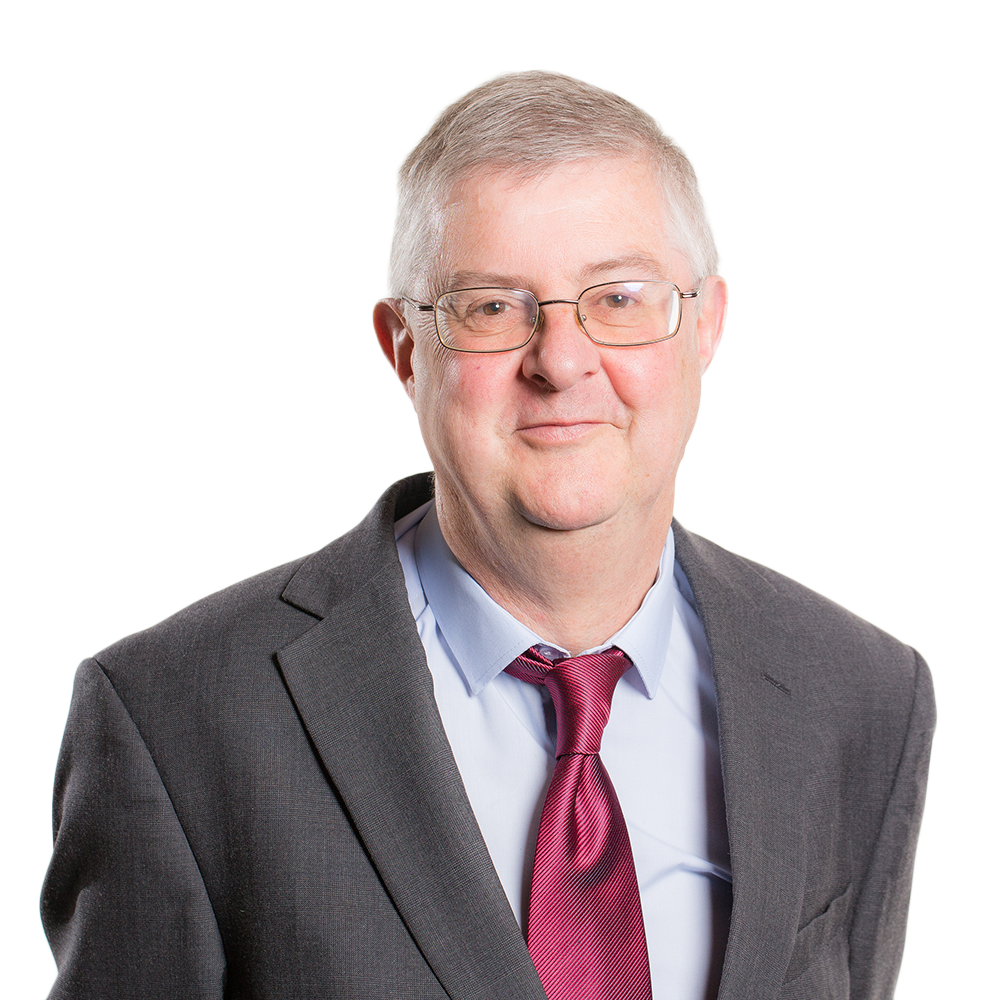
- Mark Drakeford who will replace Carwyn Jones as first minister of Wales later in 2018
  21 April – Carwyn Jones announces that he will stand down as First Minister of Wales in the Autumn, after nearly nine years in the role.
- 22 April – The London Marathon takes place, amid the hottest temperatures ever seen at the event, reaching 24.1 °C (75.3 °F) in St James's Park.
- 23 April
  - Catherine, Duchess of Cambridge, gives birth to a baby boy at St Mary's Hospital, London, who becomes fifth-in-line to the throne (after his sister Charlotte) and Elizabeth II's sixth great-grandchild. He is subsequently named Louis Arthur Charles.
  - Theresa May announces a national day of commemoration for a murdered teenager Stephen Lawrence, which will take place on 22 April every year. Eighteen-year-old Lawrence was stabbed to death on 22 April 1993, whilst waiting for a bus in Eltham.
- 24 April
  - The first statue of a woman in Parliament Square is unveiled, that of suffragette Millicent Fawcett.
  - The last 13 Toys "R" Us UK stores close in Brent Cross, Southampton, Warrington, Croydon, Derby, Swindon, Sheffield, Nottingham, Chester, Coventry, Dundee, Norwich and Belfast CastleCourt.
- 26 April – Over forty companies including Coca-Cola and Asda pledge and sign up to the UK Plastics Pact to cut plastic pollution by 2025.
- 29 April – Amber Rudd resigns as Home Secretary following the Windrush scandal. She is replaced the following day by Communities Secretary, Sajid Javid.

=== May ===
- 2 May – Cambridge Analytica files for bankruptcy, following the data privacy scandal.
- 3 May
  - Elections for many local councils and mayoralties are held in England, including all 32 London boroughs. There are losses for the Conservatives (−33) and gains for Labour (+77), the Lib Dems (+75) and Green Party (+8). Meanwhile, UKIP is nearly wiped out, losing 123 councillors and retaining just three. Other parties see a net loss of four councillors.
  - A by-election is held at the West Tyrone constituency following the resignation of MP Barry McElduff in January.
- 4 May – Órfhlaith Begley, a 26-year-old solicitor, retains West Tyrone for Sinn Féin in the previous day's by-election.
- 5 May – Matthew Hedges, a British doctoral student, is arrested in the United Arab Emirates on suspicion of spying.
- 7 May
  - The UK experiences its hottest early May bank holiday (since its introduction in 1978) with a temperature of 28.7 °C (83.66 °F) recorded at RAF Northholt in West London.
  - Mark Williams defeats John Higgins by 18 frames to 16 to win the 2018 World Snooker Championship.
- 8 May – Three votes take place in the House of Lords on the issue of Brexit. In the first, peers vote to remove the exit date of 29 March 2019 from the withdrawal bill, to give more time for negotiations. In the second, they vote to retain UK membership of EU agencies such as Euratom. In the third, they vote to give MPs a chance to vote on remaining in the European Economic Area, which would enable the UK to access the single market.
- 9 May
  - The Foreign Secretary Boris Johnson reaffirms the UK's commitment to the Iranian nuclear agreement after President Trump announces that the U.S. will pull out.
  - BMW announces the recall of 312,000 cars, after an investigation by the BBC's Watchdog finds a problem with vehicles stalling.
- 11 May
  - The campaign group Leave.EU is fined £70,000 for breaching electoral law in the 2016 EU Referendum.
  - Theresa May agrees to appoint a panel to help oversee the Grenfell fire inquiry, following pressure from campaigners.
  - First Minister Carwyn Jones confirms he will quit the Welsh Assembly at the 2021 general election.
- 16 May
  - Announcement that rail services on the East Coast Main Line will be brought back under UK government control from Stagecoach Group.
  - Theresa May loses a 15th vote on the Brexit Bill, as the House of Lords votes, by 294 to 244, to create a watchdog for enforcing EU environmental standards.
- 17 May – The UK government announces that fixed odds betting terminal payouts will be reduced to £2 under new rules, but bookmakers warns that the cut could lead to thousands of outlets closing.
- 19 May –
  - The Wedding of Prince Harry and Meghan Markle takes place at St George's Chapel, Windsor Castle, with an estimated global audience of 1.9 billion.
  - Chelsea F.C. win the FA Cup, beating Manchester United F.C. 1–0.
- 21 May – Former Mayor of London Ken Livingstone resigns from the Labour party, having been suspended since 2016 over allegations of anti-Semitism.
- 22 May
  - A memorial service at Manchester Cathedral is held at 14:30 BST, along with a national minute's silence, to mark the first anniversary of the Manchester Arena attack.
  - British retailer Marks & Spencer confirms the closure of 100 stores as part of their reorganisation of the company by 2022.
- 24 May – The chequered skipper butterfly, which became extinct in the wild in 1976 in England, is reintroduced within Rockingham Forest.
- 25 May
  - The General Data Protection Regulation (GDPR) comes into force.
  - Cabinet Secretary for Health and Sport Vaughan Gething launches a consultation to ban smoking in outdoor grounds of hospitals, schools, and playgrounds within Wales from summer 2019.
- 30 May
  - Co-Leader of the Green Party, Caroline Lucas announces that she will step down from her position in September.
  - Transport Secretary Chris Grayling says that the "rail industry has collectively failed" passengers after timetable changes caused chaos across the network.
  - The first 3D printed human corneas are created at Newcastle University.

=== June ===
- 1 June – The Met Office confirms that May 2018 was the warmest since records began in 1910 and also likely to be the sunniest since 1929.
- 5 June – The government approves a controversial plan for a third runway at Heathrow Airport.
- 7 June – Human rights campaigners lose a Supreme Court appeal over the legality of Northern Ireland's abortion law, but a majority of judges say the existing law is incompatible with human rights law in cases of fatal fetal abnormality and sexual crime.
- 8 June – Scottish drinks company Highland Spring announces that it will become the first UK water brand to introduce and trial a 100% recycled bottle in a bid to cut ocean pollution.
- 12 June – A 15,000-strong rally is held in support of Tommy Robinson, an English far-right activist.
- 13 June – By 327 votes to 126, the House of Commons rejects a Lords amendment to the EU Withdrawal Bill, which had attempted to keep the UK in the European Economic Area after Brexit. Other changes made to the bill are also overturned, including a requirement to negotiate a customs union with the EU.
- 14 June – The Lewisham East by-election is held, with Labour winning the vote, but with a significantly reduced majority.
- 15 June
  - A bill that would make upskirting a criminal offence is blocked in the House of Commons by Tory MP Sir Christopher Chope. He faces criticism from those within his own party, including Theresa May.
  - The Macintosh building at the Glasgow School of Art is gutted by another huge fire, four years after part of the same building was destroyed by fire. The fire spreads to close by buildings, including the Campus nightclub and O2 ABC music venue, which suffers "extensive damage". The Scottish Fire and Rescue Service reports no casualties.
- 17 June – The government announces an extra £20bn for the NHS by 2023, a budget increase of 3.4% a year. However, this is less than the average 3.7% the NHS had over the previous 70 years. The plan is also criticized by former Treasury officials, who cast doubt on the idea of a "Brexit dividend" and say the extra public spending will require higher taxes or public borrowing.
- 19 June
  - It becomes illegal in England and Scotland to sell rinse-off cosmetics and personal care products that contain microbeads.
  - The government announces a review into the use of cannabis for medicinal purposes.
- 20 June
  - Theresa May condemns the forced separation of migrant children from their parents in the US, but dismisses calls to cancel President Donald Trump's visit to the UK.
  - A rebellion by Conservative MPs is defeated, as the House of Commons votes by 319 to 303 against a "meaningful vote", which could have given MPs the power to stop the United Kingdom leaving the EU without a deal.
- 23 June – Around 100,000 anti-Brexit campaigners march through central London demanding a final vote on any UK exit deal. The organizers, People's Vote, say that Brexit is "not a done deal" and people must "make their voices heard", whilst James McGrory from pressure group Open Britain says there should be "a choice between leaving with the deal that the government negotiates, or staying in the European Union".
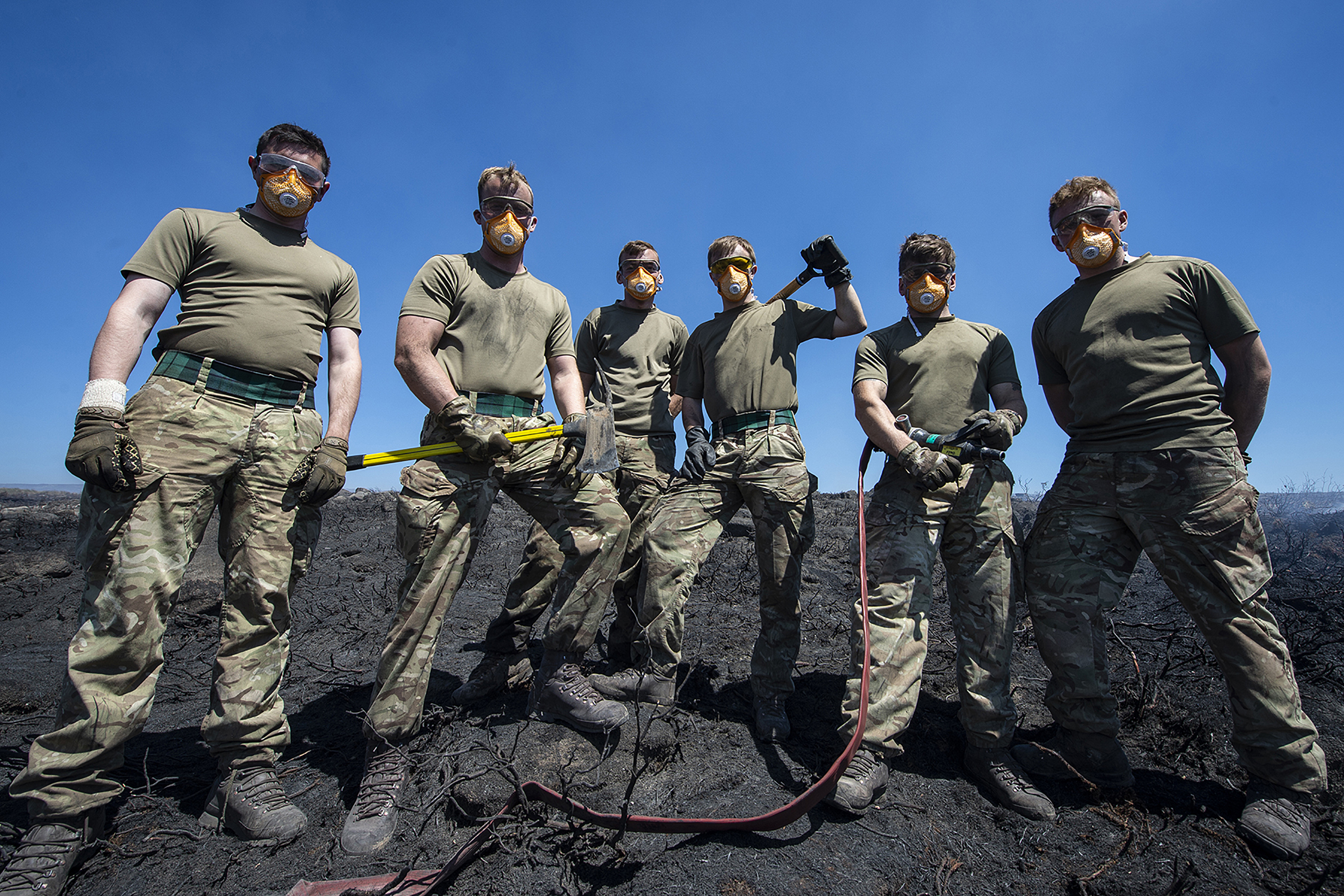
- Soldiers assist with fire fighting in Greater Manchester's countryside during the summer of 2018
  24 June
  - A series of record-breaking wildfires begin burning across the United Kingdom.
  - Train services on the East Coast Main Line come back under government control, following the failure of the franchise.
  - England record their biggest ever victory at a World Cup game, winning 6–1 against Panama, with captain Harry Kane scoring a hat-trick to take the team through to the final sixteen.
- 25 June
  - The UK experiences the hottest weather of the year so far, with temperatures reaching up to 29.4 °C (84.9 °F) in London. The highest temperature is recorded in St James's Park. The same location had experienced the year's previous record temperature of 29.1 °C (84.3 °F) in April.
  - The government throws out plans for the Tidal Lagoon Swansea Bay, claiming the £1.3 billion project is not good value for money.
- 26 June – The Society of Motor Manufacturers and Traders (SMMT) warns that there is "no Brexit dividend", urging the government to "as a minimum" remain in the customs union and forge a deal that delivers "single market benefits". In the same statement, the SMMT says that investment in new models, equipment, and facilities in the UK has halved compared to the previous year.
- 27 June – The British Medical Association (BMA) votes to oppose Brexit "as a whole" and calls for a public say on any final deal.
- 28 June – The Washington Post reports that former UKIP leader Nigel Farage is being investigated by U.S. Special Counsel Robert Mueller’s team for his ties to Donald Trump's associates and Russian colluders.
- 30 June
  - Thousands of people march through London to mark the 70th anniversary of the NHS and to protest against government cuts to the health service.
  - It becomes illegal to manufacture, import, or sell rinse-off cosmetics and personal care products containing microbeads in Wales.

=== July ===
- 3 July – England's World Cup penalty shootout win over Colombia is watched by 23.6 million viewers, the highest peak audience for live sport since England played Portugal in the 2004 European Championships.
- 4 July – Counter-terror police investigate after a man and woman are exposed to the Novichok nerve agent near Salisbury, four months after a similar incident in the area.
- 6 July – Theresa May secures approval from the cabinet to negotiate a soft Brexit. This includes proposals to create a new UK-EU free trade area, the ending of free movement but with a new "mobility framework" for UK and EU citizens, and the ending of the jurisdiction of the European Court of Justice but with the UK paying regard to its decisions in areas where common rules are in force.
- 7 July – In the World Cup quarter-finals, England win 2–0 against Sweden, taking them through to the Semi-finals on 11 July. It is the first time they have reached this stage since 1990. The match is live-streamed online by 3.8 million people, making it the BBC's highest online-viewed live programme ever.
- 8 July
  - Police launch an international murder investigation after Dawn Sturgess dies in Salisbury Hospital after being exposed to a "high dose" of novichok nerve agent in Wiltshire on 30 June.
  - David Davis resigns as Brexit secretary. Following this, one more DExEU minister, Steve Baker also resigns.
- 9 July
  - Dominic Raab is appointed as Brexit secretary after David Davis' resignation.
  - Boris Johnson resigns as Foreign Secretary, saying that the "dream is dying, suffocated by needless self-doubt". He is replaced by Jeremy Hunt.
- 10 July
  - The Royal Air Force (RAF) marks its 100th anniversary with a flyby of 100 aircraft over London and South East England. The Queen, accompanied by The Prince of Wales, also presents a new Queen's Colour to the Royal Air Force at a ceremony on the forecourt of Buckingham Palace.
  - Two vice chairs of the Conservative Party, Maria Caulfield and Ben Bradley, resign in protest at Theresa May's Chequers Brexit compromise plan.
- 11 July – England is defeated by Croatia in the World Cup Semi Final, losing 2–1.
- 12 July
  - The government publishes its White Paper, The future relationship between the United Kingdom and the European Union.
  - US President Donald Trump arrives in the UK. The four-day visit includes talks with Theresa May, tea with the Queen and a trip to Scotland. There are mass protests in London, featuring a six-metre-tall (20 ft) 'Trump baby' blimp flown over Westminster.
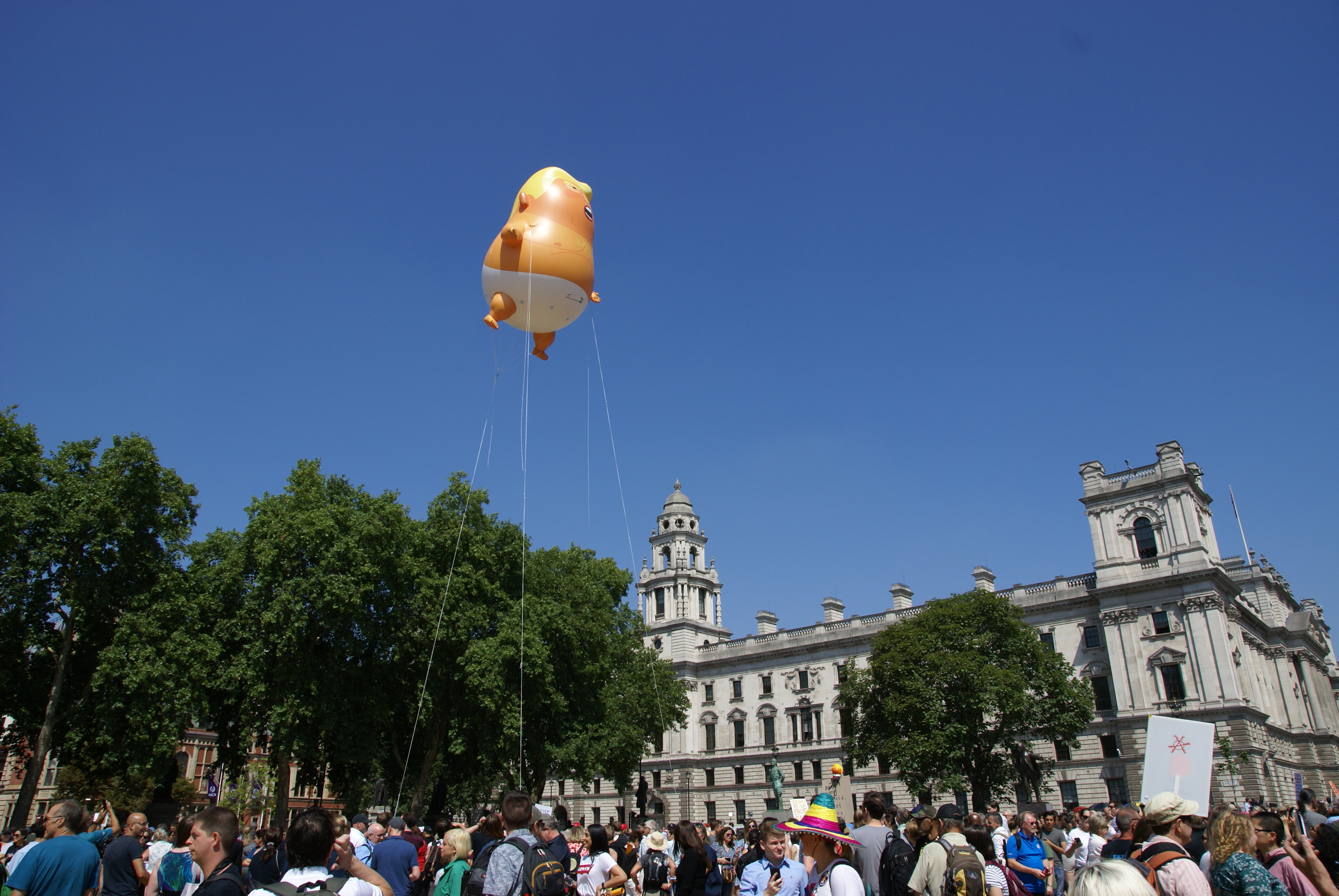
- Caricature of the US president at an Anti-Trump demonstration in London
  13 July
  - The Lightning Seeds' single "Three Lions" reaches number one in the UK singles chart for the fourth time following England's achievements in the 2018 FIFA World Cup, making it the only song to reach number one on four separate occasions with the same artist lineup. By the following week the single has plummeted to number 97, setting a record for the fastest ever fall from the top of the charts.
  - Business minister Andrew Griffiths resigns over a sexting scandal, two days before the publication of a Sunday Mirror story about the scandal.
- 14 July
  - The RRS Sir David Attenborough is launched into the River Mersey by its namesake, Sir David Attenborough.
  - England finishes fourth at the 2018 FIFA World Cup, losing the third place play-off 2–0 to Belgium.
- 15 July – The ongoing heatwave and dry conditions lead to a huge grass fire on Wanstead Flats, East London, which becomes the largest incident of its kind ever dealt with by the London Fire Brigade.
- England footballer Harry Kane wins the Golden Boot at the 2018 World Cup after scoring 6 goals in the tournament. Kane is the first Englishman to win the Golden Boot since Gary Lineker at the 1986 World Cup.
- 16 July – The government confirms that it will accept all four demands by the European Research Group. Downing Street insists they are all consistent with its recent Brexit white paper, but critics say the Chequers agreement of 6 July is dead. MPs vote by 305 to 302 in favour of the amendment.
- 17 July
  - Brexit campaign group Vote Leave is fined and referred to police for breaking electoral law.
  - In a vote of 307 to 301, MPs reject a proposal to form a customs union if the UK and EU do not agree on a trade deal. However, in a separate vote of 305 to 301, they back an amendment to keep the UK in the European medicines regulatory network.
- 18 July – Sir Cliff Richard wins a privacy case against the BBC over its coverage of a police raid on his home. High Court judge Mr Justice Mann awards him £210,000 in damages.
- 19 July – Conservative MP Philip Davies submits a letter of no confidence in Theresa May to the chair of the backbench 1922 Committee, saying he has "lost trust" in her ability to deliver the EU referendum result.
- 23 July – In response to the ongoing heatwave, the Met Office urges people to "stay out of the sun" and issues a level 3 amber alert for the east and south-east of England.
- 24 July – Home Secretary Sajid Javid announces that the UK government will not object to the United States seeking the death penalty for two suspected British members of ISIL – waiving its long-standing objection to foreign executions.
- 26 July
  - Michel Barnier, the EU's chief Brexit negotiator, rejects the UK's proposal to collect customs duties on its behalf.
  - The ongoing heatwave reaches its peak; temperatures at Faversham reach 35.3 °C (95.5 °F)—the hottest day of the year.
- 29 July – Ministers reveal plans to send in the Army to deliver food, medicine and fuel supplies if the UK leaves the EU without a deal. It is also reported that supermarkets are beginning to stockpile supplies.
- 30 July – The Supreme Court rules that legal permission is no longer required to end care for patients in a permanent vegetative state.
- 31 July – Xeneral Webster, 19, is jailed for 17 years for the manslaughter of Joanne Rand, who died in June 2017, eleven days after he splashed her with acid. The case is the first acid killing in the UK.

=== August ===
- 2 August – The Bank of England raises the baseline interest rate from 0.5 to 0.75%, its highest level since March 2009.
- 6 August – Boris Johnson is criticised for a column that he had written in the Daily Telegraph. As part of an article discussing the introduction of a burka ban in Denmark, Johnson said that Muslim women who wore burkas "look like letter boxes" and compared them to "bank robbers".
- 10 August
  - Sports Direct tycoon Mike Ashley steps in to buy department store House of Fraser for £90m, after the chain calls in administrators.
  - The government announces that it will lower the screening age for bowel cancer in England from 60 to 50, bringing it into line with Scotland.
- 14 August – A man is arrested on suspicion of terrorism offences after a car is driven into people and cyclists outside the Houses of Parliament, causing injuries to three of them, before crashing into security barriers.
- 15 August – Iain Livingstone is confirmed as the new chief constable of Police Scotland, having been in interim charge of the national force since last autumn.
- 18 August – 45 years after forming in 1973, folk rock band Runrig performs their last-ever show against the backdrop of Stirling Castle.
- 20 August – The government announces its intention to take control of Birmingham Prison from the private security company G4S after the Chief Inspector of Prisons said it had fallen into a "state of crisis", and described it as the worst prison he had ever visited.
- 23 August – The government publishes the first in a series of guidelines for businesses and the public on how to prepare in the event of a "no deal" Brexit scenario.
- 25 August – British YouTuber KSI gets a majority draw in his YouTube boxing match vs American YouTuber Logan Paul at the Manchester Arena. The fight goes down as the biggest event in YouTube history.
- 29 August – Former SNP leader Alex Salmond resigns from the party to avoid internal division amid sexual misconduct claims, which he denies.
- 30 August – Labour MP Frank Field resigns the Labour whip over "excuses for the party’s toleration of antisemitism". He retains his party membership, describing himself as an "independent Labour MP".
- 31 August – Transport officials announce that the opening of London's £15bn Crossrail line – Europe's largest infrastructure project – will be delayed by nine months "to ensure a safe and reliable railway".

=== September ===
- 1 September – As part of the phase-out of incandescent light bulbs, it becomes illegal to import non-directional halogen light bulbs into the United Kingdom.
- 2 September – A huge fire destroys part of the Littlewoods Pools building, one of the most famous landmarks in Liverpool.
- 3 September
  - The Met Office confirms that 2018 was the joint hottest summer on record for the UK, alongside 2006, 2003 and 1976, and the joint hottest for England, alongside 2022.
  - Latest available data shows that Scottish National Party membership has overtaken the Conservatives across the UK for the first time, pushing the party of government into third place.
- 5 September – Two Russian nationals are named as suspects of the poisoning of Sergei and Yulia Skripal.
- 6 September – The 659-megawatt Walney Extension, the world's largest offshore wind farm, opens off the coast of Cumbria.
- 18 September – Storm Ali leaves homes and businesses without power and effects road, rail and air travel, killing one man in Northern Ireland.
- 21 September – Theresa May demands new proposals from the EU to break the "impasse" after her Chequers plan was rejected by EU leaders. The pound falls by its highest amount of the year so far.
- 22 September – US cable giant Comcast wins a rare blind auction process for broadcaster Sky, set by the UK's Takeover Panel.
- 24 September – An inquiry hears testimonies from patients affected by the Contaminated Blood Scandal of the 1970s and 1980s, the worst-ever NHS treatment disaster.
- 25 September
  - The Office for National Statistics reports that life expectancy improvements in the UK have stalled for the first time since records began.
  - Labour Party delegates approve a motion that could pave the way for a second EU referendum if MPs are unable to agree over a Brexit deal.
- 26 September
  - 21st Century Fox announces it will sell its 39% stake in Sky UK to Comcast, ending Rupert Murdoch's three decade association with the broadcaster.
  - It is reported that MP David Rutley has been appointed as a Minister of Food (the first since 1958) to ensure the protection of food supplies through the Brexit process.
  - Three men become the first people to receive jail sentences for an anti-fracking protest in the UK.

=== October ===
- 1 October
  - Paul Dacre becomes chairman and Editor-in-Chief of Associated Newspapers and stands down as Editor of the Daily Mail in the following month.
  - The ban on microbeads in rinse-off cosmetics and cleaning products is extended to Northern Ireland.
- 2 October – The government announces that heterosexual couples in England and Wales will be given the right to enter into civil partnerships rather than marriage.
- 6 October – In the latest march organised by All Under One Banner, tens of thousands of people march through Edinburgh in support of Scottish independence.
- 12 October – The Wedding of Princess Eugenie and Jack Brooksbank takes place at St George's Chapel, Windsor Castle.
- 13 October – Storm Callum: Parts of Wales experience their worst flooding in 30 years.
- 16 October – Pepper becomes the first robot to appear at a UK parliamentary meeting, talking to MPs about the future of artificial intelligence in education.
- 18 October – A case of bovine spongiform encephalopathy (so-called "mad cow disease") is confirmed on a farm in Aberdeenshire, the first of its kind in Scotland for 10 years.
- 20 October – A march through central London demanding a vote on the final Brexit deal attracts an estimated 700,000 people, according to its organisers. A later official estimate reported the number to be 250,000.
- 21 October – The Confederation of British Industry (CBI) reports that 80% of UK firms in their survey have cancelled or delayed investments due to Brexit uncertainty. The figure a year earlier was 36–40%.
- 24 October – Westminster Magistrates' Court imposes the first conviction for running an unregistered school in England, when two defendants are convicted of operating the Al-Istiqamah Learning Centre from an office block in west London.
- 25 October – Gavin Williamson announces that women who serve in the Army are now able to transfer into infantry roles, including the special forces, such as the SAS.
- 27 October – Leicester City's owner Vichai Srivaddhanaprabha is killed in a helicopter crash outside the King Power Stadium.
- 29 October – Chancellor Philip Hammond says the era of austerity "is finally coming to an end" as he delivers his third budget.

=== November ===
- English Channel migrant crossings crisis: the numbers of would-be immigrants crossing to the UK by small boat are noted to be accelerating.
- 1 November – Doctors are able to prescribe cannabis products to patients in England, Wales and Scotland.
- 4 November – Ross Edgley, 33, becomes the first person to swim around the entire coast of Great Britain. His journey of 1,780 miles has lasted for 157 days.
- 6 November – Renewable energy capacity overtakes that of fossil fuels in the UK for the first time, at 41.9 gigawatts.
- 9 November – Transport minister Jo Johnson resigns from the Cabinet and calls for a fresh referendum on Brexit, including an option to remain in the EU.
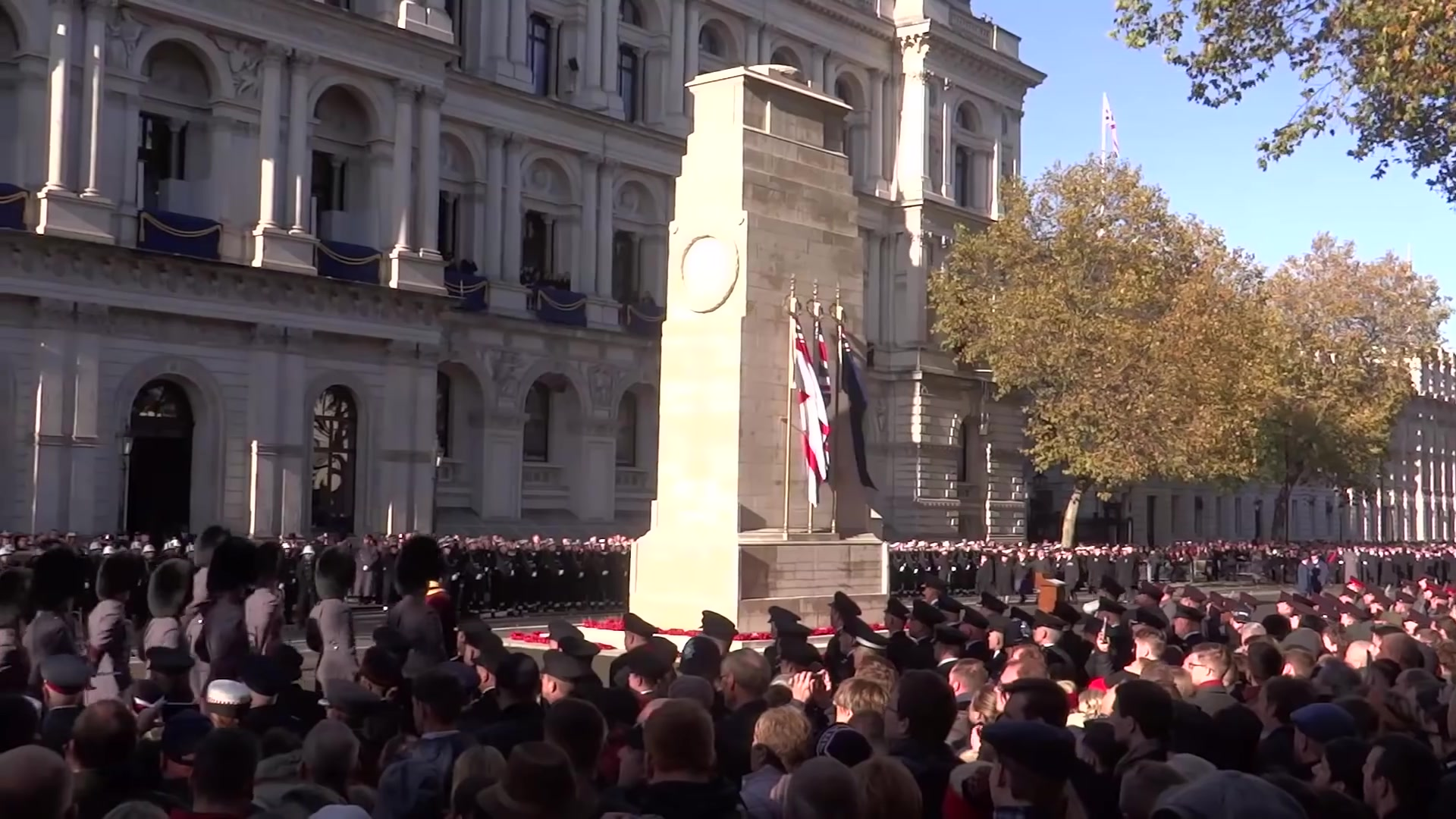
- Remembrance ceremony at the Cenotaph
  11 November – The United Kingdom marks the 100th anniversary of the end of the First World War, with a wreath-laying ceremony at the Cenotaph accompanied by the ringing of church bells throughout the country, followed by a march past the Cenotaph of 10,000 people. In the evening there is a ceremony at Westminster Abbey and 1,000 beacons are lit nationwide.
- 14 November – Theresa May secures Cabinet support for her Brexit Withdrawal Agreement after "a long, detailed and impassioned debate".
- 15 November – Brexit Secretary Dominic Raab resigns, stating that he "cannot in good conscience support the terms proposed for our deal with the EU". Further resignations follow: Work and Pensions Secretary Esther McVey, Junior Brexit minister Suella Braverman, Northern Ireland minister Shailesh Vara, and Parliamentary Private Secretary Anne-Marie Trevelyan. The pound falls sharply in response.
- 16 November
  - Steve Barclay is named as the new Brexit Secretary, while Amber Rudd returns to the Cabinet as Secretary of State for Work and Pensions.
  - After a 2-week factfinding visit to the UK, international lawyer Professor Philip Alston, United Nations Special Rapporteur on extreme poverty and human rights, issues a report on the UK, the organisation's first such probe into an advanced European country since 2011, which is critical of the effects of the government austerity programme.
- 17 November – Thousands of protesters block the five main bridges over the River Thames in central London as part of "Extinction Rebellion", a campaign to raise awareness of climate change and biodiversity loss.
- 25 November – After more than 18 months of negotiations, EU leaders endorse the Brexit withdrawal agreement.
- 26 November – British academic Matthew Hedges, jailed earlier in the month for spying in the UAE, is pardoned with immediate effect.
- 28 November – The government announces plans for the UK's first carbon capture and storage project.
- 29 November – Labour MP Lloyd Russell-Moyle reveals that he is HIV positive, becoming the first politician to announce his HIV status in the House of Commons, and only the second to disclose publicly that they are living with the condition.
- 30 November – Sam Gyimah resigns as Minister of State for Universities, Science, Research and Innovation, saying that he cannot vote for Theresa May's Brexit deal.

=== December ===
- 1 December – The government confirms that it will not use the EU Galileo satellite system for defence or critical national infrastructure after Brexit.
- 4 December – In a vote of 311–293, MPs find the Government in contempt of parliament for failing to publish its full legal advice on Theresa May's Brexit deal. They also back Dominic Grieve's amendment to hand back control of Brexit to Parliament if the deal is defeated.
- 5 December
  - The Attorney General's full legal advice on the Brexit deal is published.
  - The 100,000 Genomes Project is completed by scientists in Cambridge.
- 10 December – The government delays the parliamentary vote on approving the European Union Withdrawal Agreement and Political Declaration, postponing it from the following day to 21 January 2019. The pound falls to its lowest level in 18 months.
- 12 December – Theresa May wins a vote of no confidence on her leadership of the Conservative Party by 200–117.
- 16 December – Tolls for use of the Severn crossing bridges between England and Wales are scrapped.
- 18 December – Manchester United dismiss manager Jose Mourinho after two and a half years in charge.
- 19 December – Tens of thousands of passengers at Gatwick Airport experience flight disruption due to reported drone sightings over the airfield. Police were still hunting for the drone operator the following day. Two days later, the runway reopens for passengers.
- 28 December – HMV goes into administration for the second time (the first was in 2013).

== Publications ==
- Jason Barker's novel Marx Returns.
- Julian Barnes' novel The Only Story.
- Lindsey Davis' historical crime novel Pandora's Boy.
- Luke Jenning' thriller Codename Villanelle.
- Ian McDonald's time travel romance novella Time Was.
- The Secret Barrister, written by an anonymous author.

== Births ==
- 23 April – Prince Louis
- 18 June – Lena Elizabeth Tindall, daughter of Zara Phillips and Mike Tindall

== Deaths ==
=== January ===
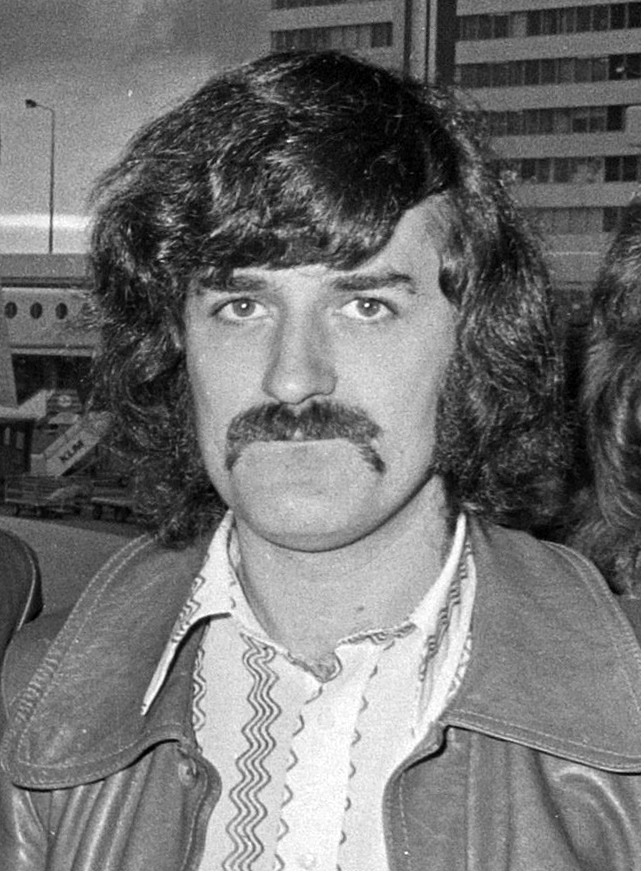
Ray Thomas in 1970

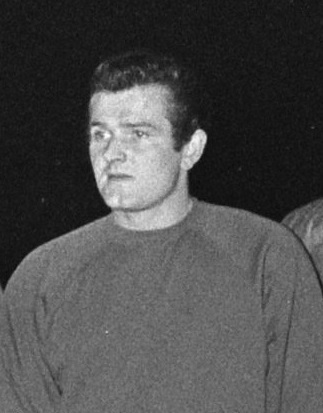
Tommy Lawrence in 1966

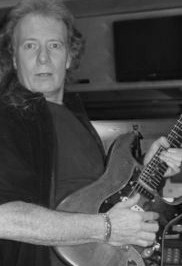
Eddie Clarke in 2009

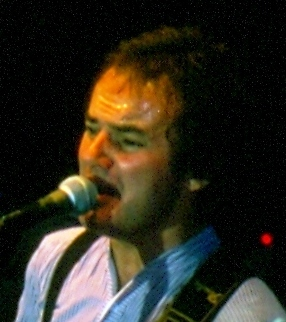
Jim Rodford in 1979

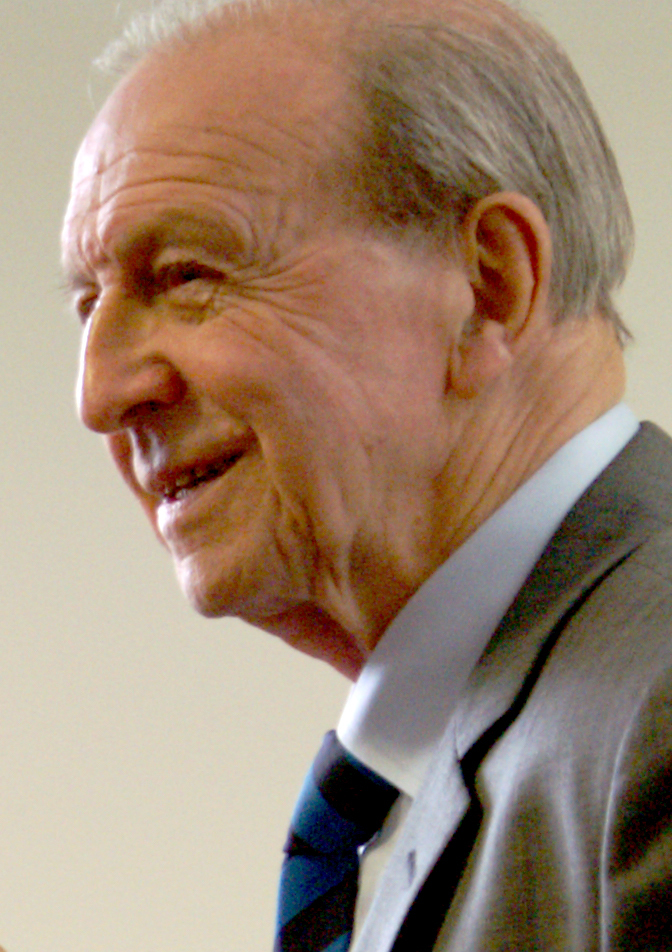
Jimmy Armfield in 2012

- 2 January
  - Tony Calder, 74, English music promoter and executive (The Beatles, The Rolling Stones).
  - Alan Deakin, 76, English footballer (Aston Villa, Walsall, Tamworth).
- 4 January
  - Peter Birdseye, 98, English footballer (Wycombe Wanderers).
  - Ray Thomas, 76, English singer-songwriter ("Veteran Cosmic Rocker", "For My Lady") and Hall of Fame musician (The Moody Blues), prostate cancer.
- 6 January
  - Nigel Sims, 86, English footballer (Aston Villa, Wolverhampton, Peterborough).
- 8 January
  - Jenny Joseph, 85, English poet.
  - Jackie Perry, 93, English rugby league footballer of the 1940s and 1950s.
  - Tricia Walker, 53, British author, breast cancer.
- 9 January
  - Tommy Lawrence, 77, Scottish footballer (Liverpool, Tranmere Rovers, national team).
  - Terence Marsh, 86, British production designer
  - Ted Phillips, 84, English footballer (Ipswich Town, Leyton Orient, Colchester United), dementia.
- 10 January
  - Eddie Clarke, 67, British guitarist (Motörhead, Fastway), pneumonia.
  - David Fisher, 88, British television writer (Doctor Who, Dixon of Dock Green, Hammer House of Horror).
  - John McGlashan, 50, Scottish footballer (Millwall, Peterborough United, Rotherham United).
- 11 January
  - Ednyfed Hudson Davies, 88, Welsh politician, MP for Conway (1966–1970) and Caerphilly (1979–1983).
- 12 January
  - Bella Emberg, 80, English actress (The Russ Abbot Show).
- 13 January
  - Rick Jolly, 71, British Royal Navy surgeon.
- 14 January
  - Cyrille Regis, 59, English footballer, suspected heart attack.
- 15 January
  - Olive Nicol, Baroness Nicol, 94, British politician and life peer, Member of the House of Lords (since 1983).
- 16 January
  - Ed Doolan, 76, broadcaster (BBC Radio WM, BRMB; first local presenter to be inducted into the Radio Academy Hall of Fame).
  - Rodney Fern, 69, English football player (Leicester City, Chesterfield), dementia.
- 18 January
  - John Barton, 89, British theatre director, co-founder of the Royal Shakespeare Company.
  - Arthur Davidson, 89, British politician, complications from a fall.
  - Peter Mayle, 78, British author (A Year in Provence).
  - Laurie Morgan, 87, British government official, Chief Minister of Guernsey (2004–2007).
- 20 January
  - Jim Rodford, 76, English bassist (Argent, The Kinks, The Zombies), injuries from a fall.
- 22 January
  - Jimmy Armfield, 82, English football player (Blackpool, national team) and manager (Leeds United), world champion (1966), cancer.
  - Patrick Cryne, 66, English businessman (iSOFT) and football team owner (Barnsley F.C.), cancer. (death announced on this date)
- 23 January
  - Tracey Moore, 76, English cricketer (Norfolk, Minor Counties North, Minor Counties East), cancer. (death announced on this date)
  - Richard Woollacott, 40, British racehorse trainer.
- 24 January
  - Mark E. Smith, 60, British singer and songwriter (The Fall).
- 26 January
  - Stacey Young, 52, model and actress (wife of Paul Young)
- 27 January
  - John Wall, 85, British engineer and inventor (Crayford focuser).
- 28 January
  - Neil Harris, 63, British musician (Sham 69), cancer.
- 29 January
  - Paul Alcock, 64, English football referee, cancer.
  - Sir Cyril Taylor, 82, British educator.
- 30 January
  - Sir Henry Brooke, 81, British lawyer and judge, Lord Justice of Appeal (1996–2006), complications from cardiac surgery.
- 31 January
  - Peter King, 5th Earl of Lovelace, 66, British peer. (death announced on this date)

=== February ===
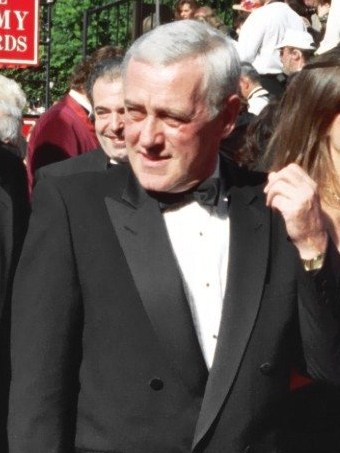
John Mahoney in 1994

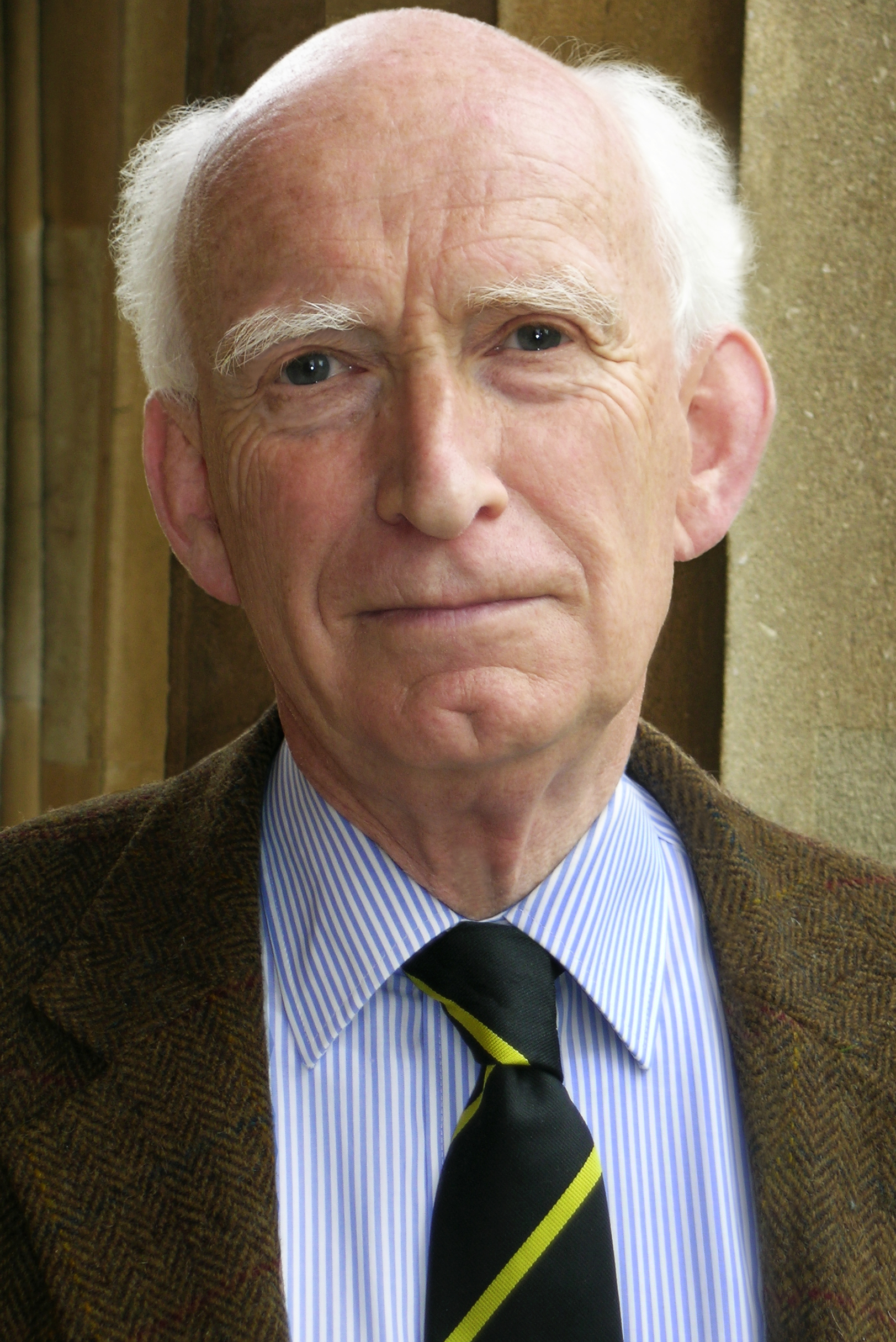
Donald Lynden-Bell in 2008

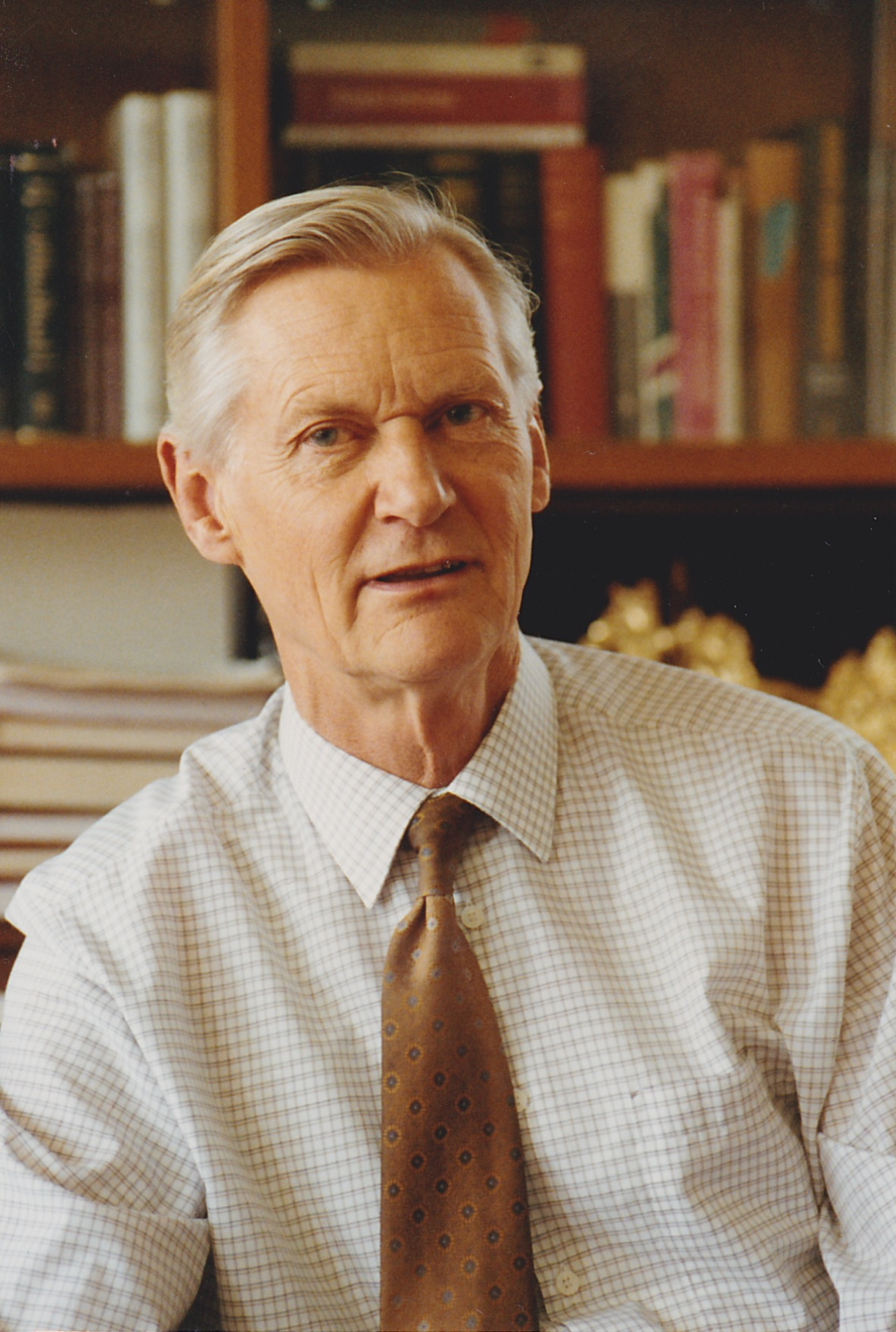
Alan R. Battersby

- 1 February – Patricia Lindop, 87, radiation biologist.
- 2 February
  - Malcolm Jefferson, 71, British racehorse trainer.
  - Alan Maynard, 73, health economist.
- 4 February
  - Alan Baker, 78, British mathematician, recipient of the Fields Medal (1970), stroke.
  - Kenneth Haigh, 86, English actor.
  - John Mahoney, 77, English-American actor, throat cancer.
- 5 February
  - Richard Doughty, 57, English cricketer (Gloucestershire).
- 6 February
  - Donald Lynden-Bell, 82, English astrophysicist.
  - Michael White, 58, British author and musician (Thompson Twins).
- 9 February
  - Anne Treisman, 82, British psychologist.
- 10 February
  - Sir Alan Battersby, 92, British organic chemist.
  - Sir Lawrence Byford, 92, British police officer and author, Chief Inspector of Constabulary (1983–1987).
- 13 February
  - Ernest Hecht, 88, Czechoslovak-born British publisher.
- 14 February
  - Angus Black, 92, Scottish rugby player (Lions, national team).
  - Al Garner, 88, British jazz musician.
- 19 February
  - Geoff Pimblett, 73, British rugby league player (England national team, St Helens R.F.C.).
  - Sir John Orr, 72, British police officer.
  - Stormin, 34, British grime musician, skin cancer.
- 20 February
  - David Barons, 81, British racehorse trainer.
  - Judy Blame, 58, English stylist and art director.
  - Ian Williams, 27, British rugby union player (Doncaster Knights, Rotherham Titans).
- 21 February
  - Emma Chambers, 53, British actress (The Vicar of Dibley).
  - Ian Aitken, 90, British journalist and political commentator.
- 22 February
  - Ivor Smith, 92, British architect (Park Hill). (death announced on this date)
- 23 February
  - Eddy Amoo, 74, British soul singer (The Real Thing).
- 25 February
  - Penny Vincenzi, 78, British writer.
  - Scott Westgarth, 31, British boxer.
- 26 February
  - Sir Paul Jenkins, 63, British lawyer, Treasury Solicitor (2006–2014).
- 27 February
  - Peter Miles, 89, English actor (Z-Cars, Doctor Who). (death announced on this date)
- 28 February
  - John Muir, 70, Scottish footballer (St Johnstone, Alloa).
  - Kieron Durkan, 44, English footballer (Wrexham, Stockport County, Macclesfield Town).

=== March ===
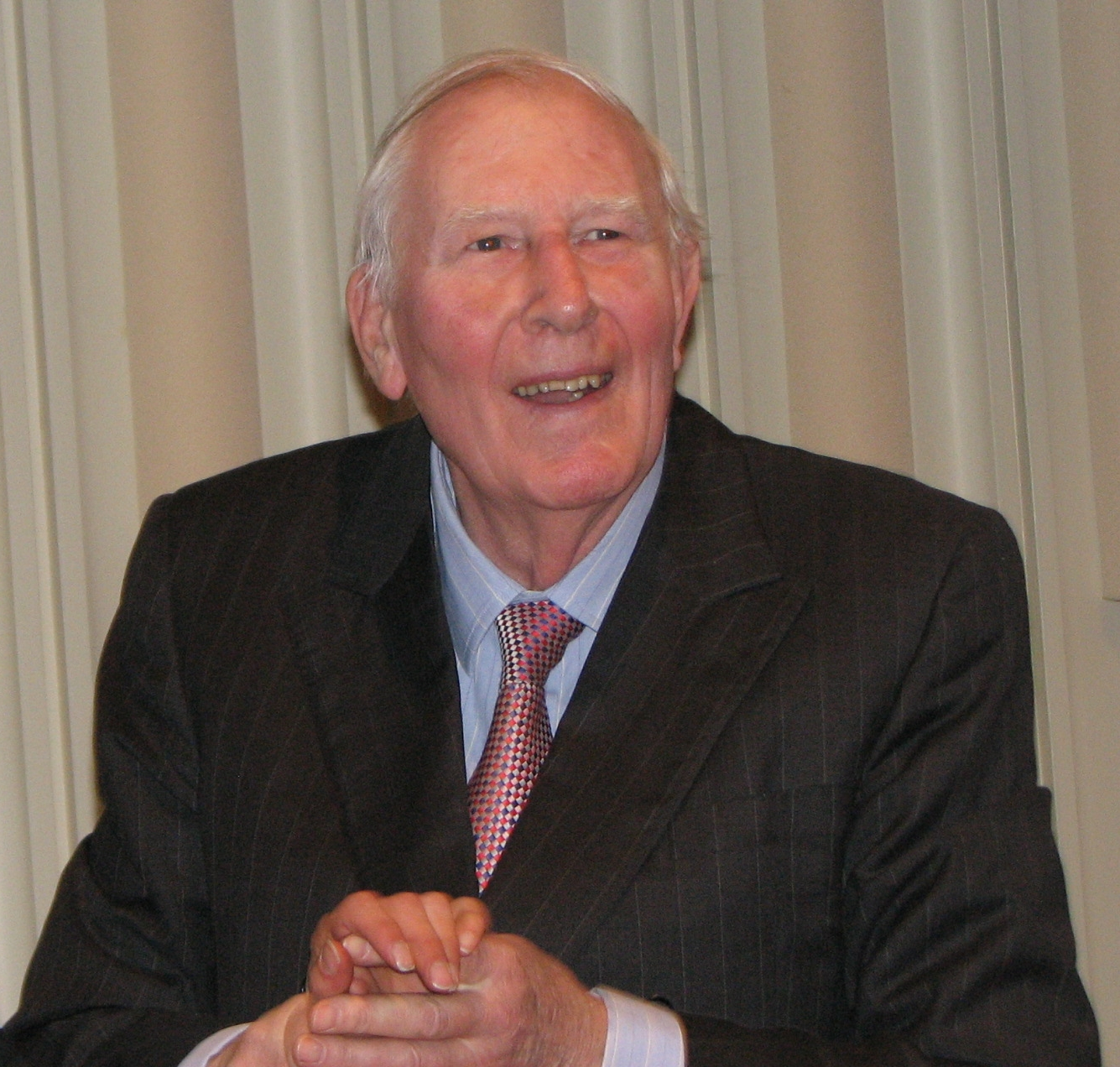
Roger Bannister in 2009

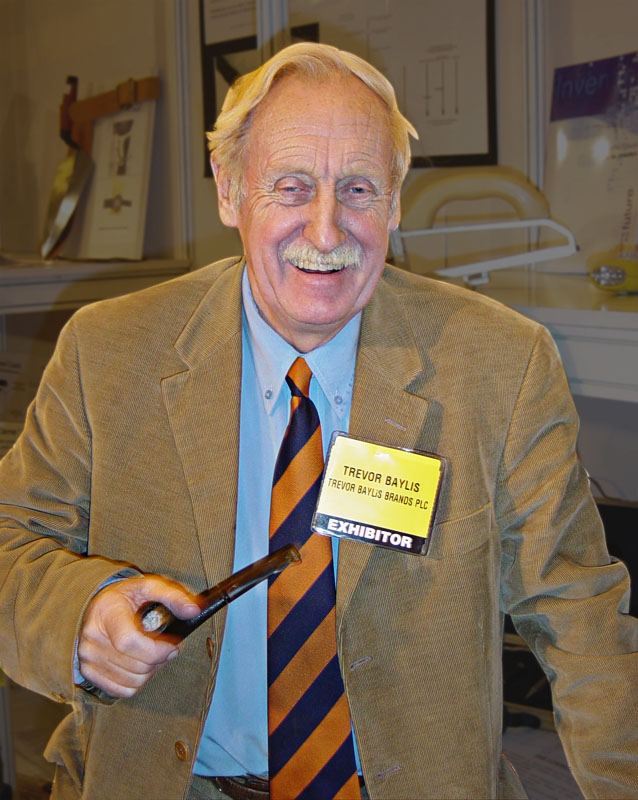
Trevor Baylis in 2006

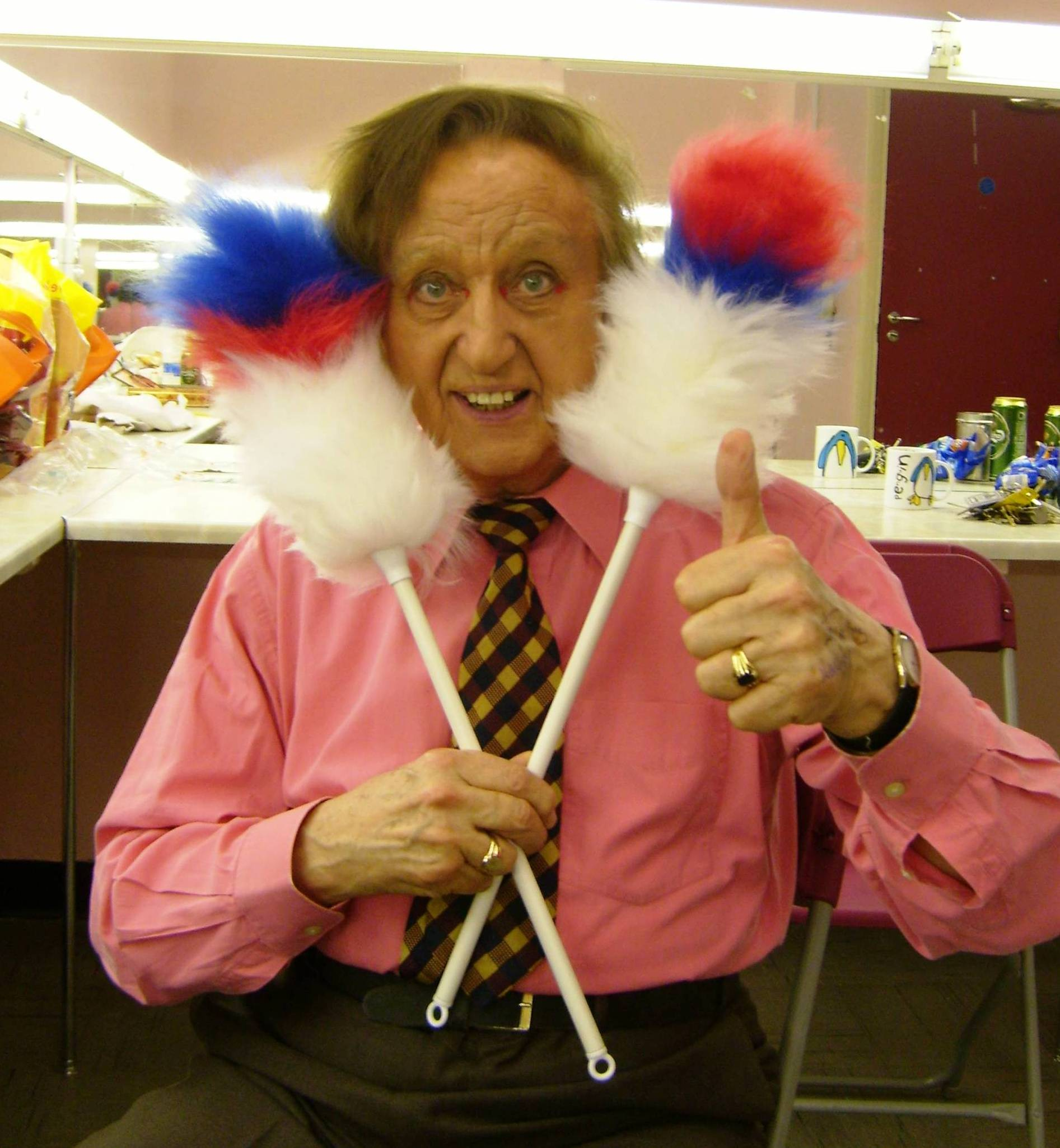
Sir Ken Dodd in 2007

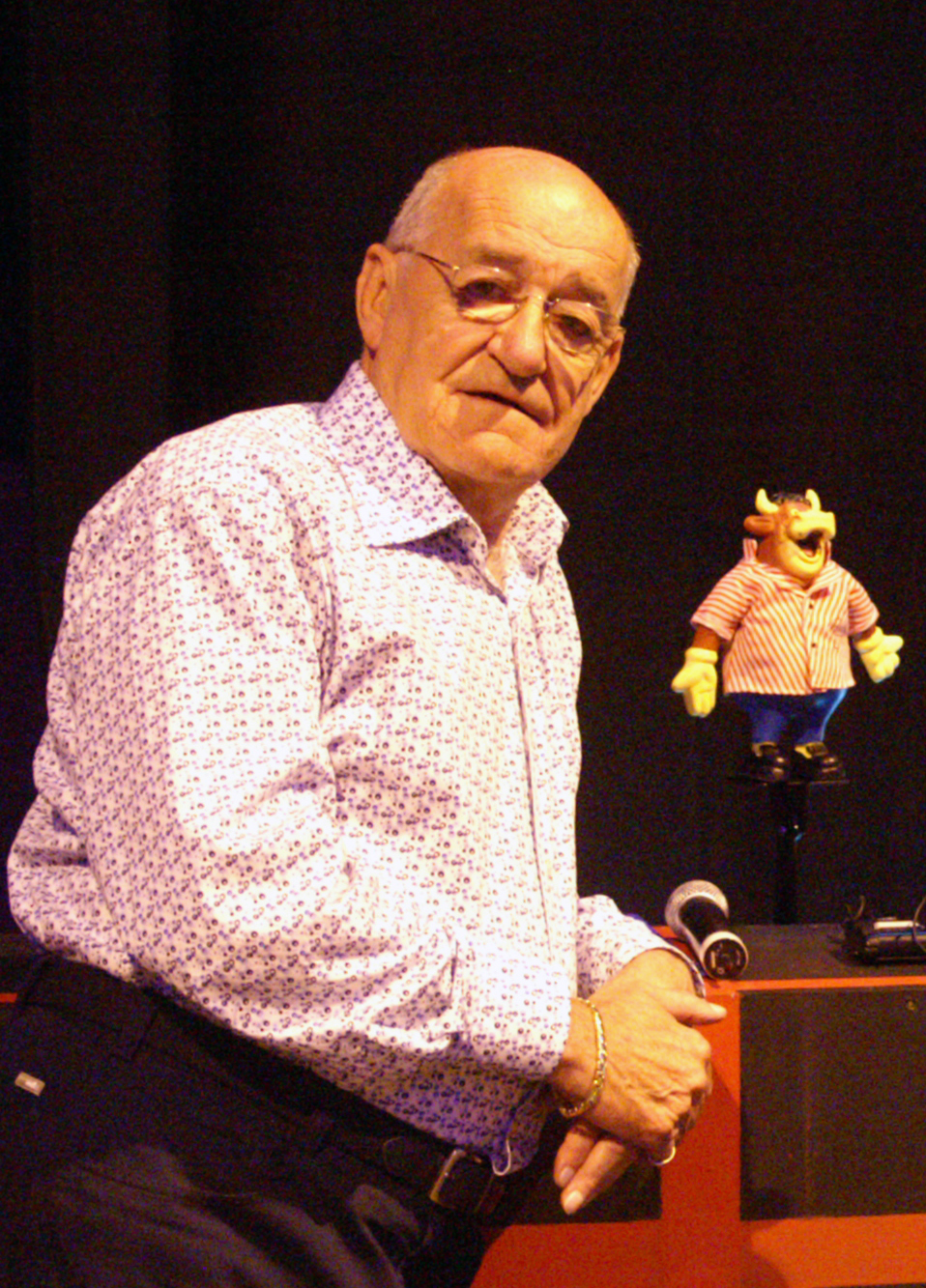
Jim Bowen in 2008

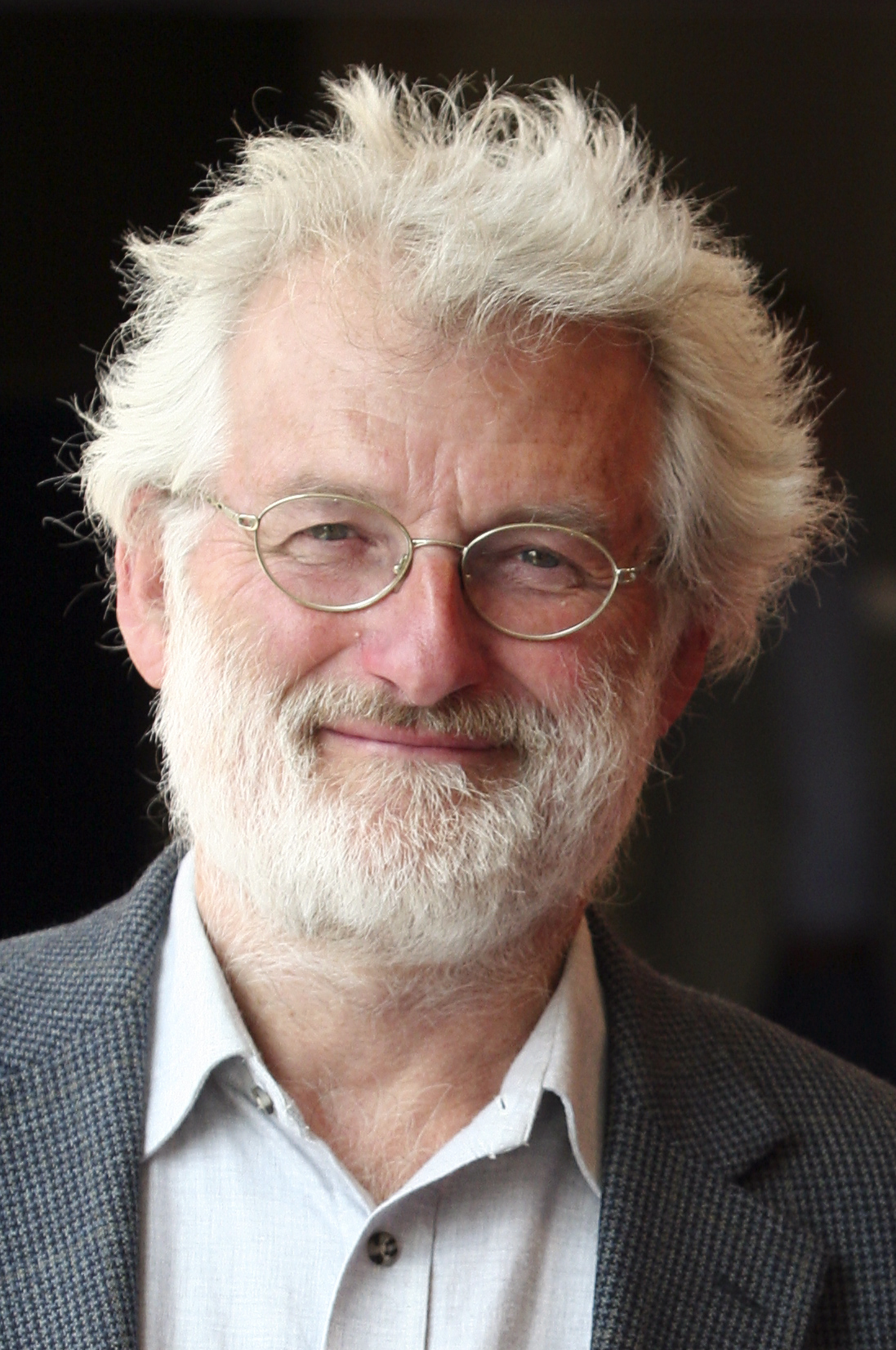
John Sulston

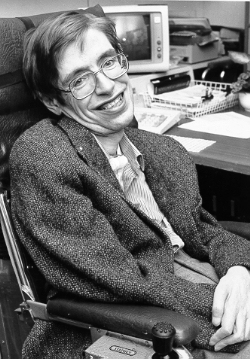
Professor Stephen Hawking

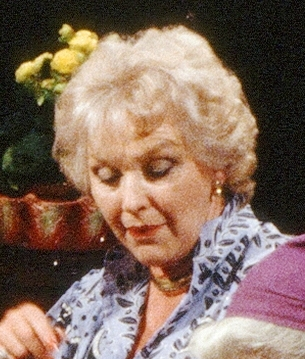
Katie Boyle in 1988

- 1 March
  - Beth Morris, 74, Welsh actress (Son of Dracula).
- 2 March
  - Gerry Lowe, 90, English rugby player (Warrington Wolves).
- 3 March
  - Roger Bannister, 88, English athlete and neurologist, first man to run a sub four-minute mile.
  - Patrick Doyle, 32, Scottish drummer (Veronica Falls).
  - Arthur Stewart, 76, Northern Irish footballer (Glentoran, Derby County, Detroit Cougars). (death announced on this date)
  - Ian Stewart, Baron Stewartby, 82, British politician and numismatist.
- 4 March
  - Sir William McAlpine, 6th Baronet, 82, British engineering construction executive, manager of Sir Robert McAlpine.
  - Alex Rennie, 69, Scottish footballer (St Johnstone, Dundee United) and manager (Stenhousemuir).
- 5 March
  - Trevor Baylis, 80, British inventor (windup radio).
  - John Kurila, 74, Scottish footballer (Northampton Town, Celtic).
  - Michael Watts, 79, British journalist.
- 6 March
  - Zena Skinner, 91, British television chef.
  - John Sulston, 75, British biologist, academic, Nobel Prize laureate (2002).
- 7 March
  - John Molyneux, 87, English footballer.
- 8 March
  - Henry Hope-Frost, 47, British journalist, traffic collision.
  - Antoni Imiela, 63, German-born British convicted rapist.
- 10 March
  - Wally Gould, 79, English footballer (York City, Brighton, Hellenic).
- 11 March
  - Sir Ken Dodd, 90, English comedian (Diddy Men), singer-songwriter ("Tears") and actor (Hamlet), chest infection.
- 13 March
  - Brenda Dean, 74, British trade unionist and peer.
  - Claudia Fontaine, 57, English backing vocalist. (death announced on this date)
  - Ken Mulhearn, 72, English footballer (Shrewsbury Town, Stockport County, Manchester City).
- 14 March
  - Jim Bowen, 80, English stand-up comedian (The Comedians) and TV personality (Bullseye).
  - Stephen Hawking, 76, English theoretical physicist, professor (University of Cambridge) and writer (A Brief History of Time), ALS.
- 15 March
  - Ellis Daw, 89, British zoo executive, founder of Dartmoor Zoological Park.
- 16 March
  - Raymond Wilson, 89, British physicist.
- 17 March
  - Nicholas Edwards, Baron Crickhowell, 84, British politician, Secretary of State for Wales (1979–1987).
- 18 March
  - Ivor Richard, Baron Richard, 85, British politician and diplomat, Lord Privy Seal (1997–98), ambassador to UN, MP for Barons Court (1964–1974).
- 19 March
  - George Meek, 84, Scottish footballer (Leeds United, Walsall). (death announced on this date)
  - Keith O'Brien, 80, Scottish Roman Catholic Cardinal, Archbishop of St Andrews and Edinburgh (1985–2013), complications from a fall.
- 20 March
  - Scott Ambler, 57, British dancer and choreographer. (death announced on this date)
  - Katie Boyle, 91, Italian-born British actress, television personality, and game-show panellist.
- 21 March
  - John Bacon, 83, British news reader (ITV Anglia, BBC).
- 22 March
  - Fergus Anckorn, 99, British magician, longest-serving member of The Magic Circle. (death announced on this date)
- 23 March
  - Philip Kerr, 62, British author (March Violets, Children of the Lamp, A Philosophical Investigation).
- 24 March
  - Bill Lucas, 101, British RAF officer and Olympic long-distance runner (1948).
- 25 March
  - David Cobham, 87, British film director (Tarka the Otter), stroke.
- 28 March
  - Bobby Ferguson, 80, English football player (Derby County) and manager (Ipswich).
  - Mike Tucker, 73, British equestrian rider and commentator.
- 29 March
  - Ron Mailer, 85, Scottish footballer (Dunfermline Athletic).
  - Pollyanna Pickering, 75, wildlife artist and environmentalist
- 30 March
  - Bill Maynard, 89, English actor (Heartbeart, Confessions of a Window Cleaner, Adolf Hitler: My Part in his Downfall), complications of a fall.
  - Josie Farrington, Baroness Farrington of Ribbleton, 77, British politician, life peer (since 1994).
- 31 March
  - Chris Edwards, 41, British boxer, heart attack.

=== April ===
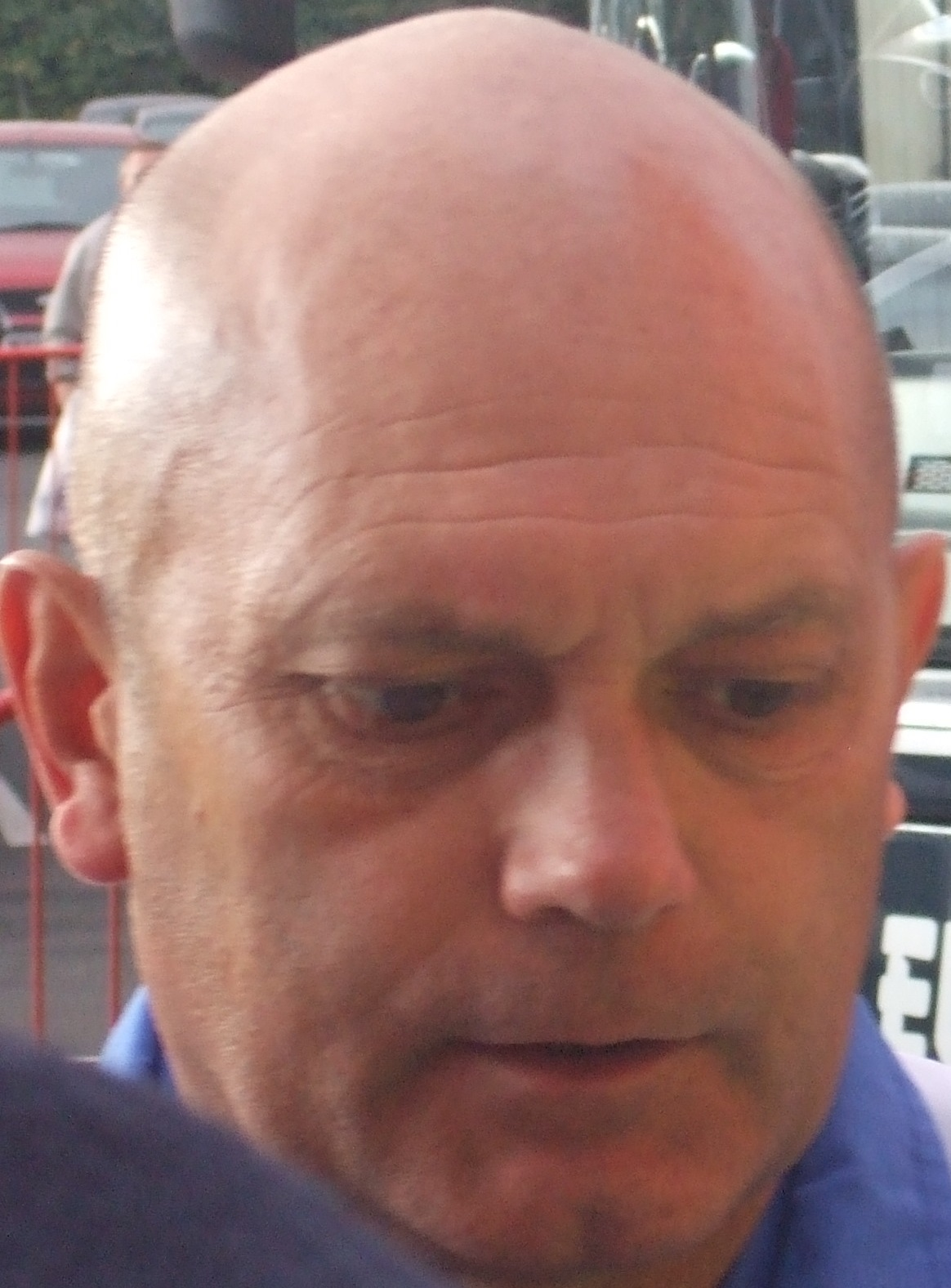
Ray Wilkins in 2008

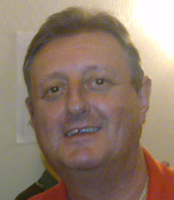
Eric Bristow in 2009

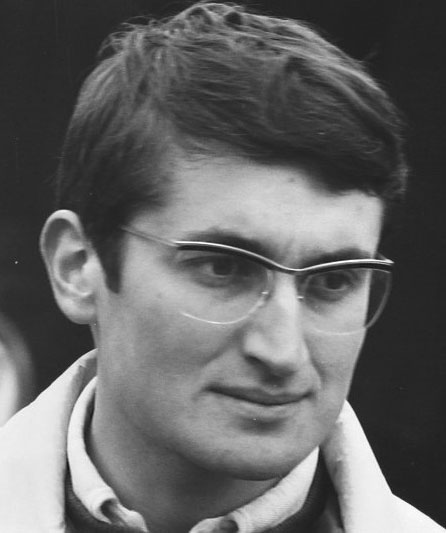
John Miles in 1970

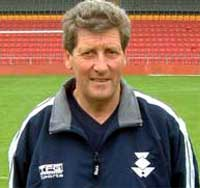
John Lambie

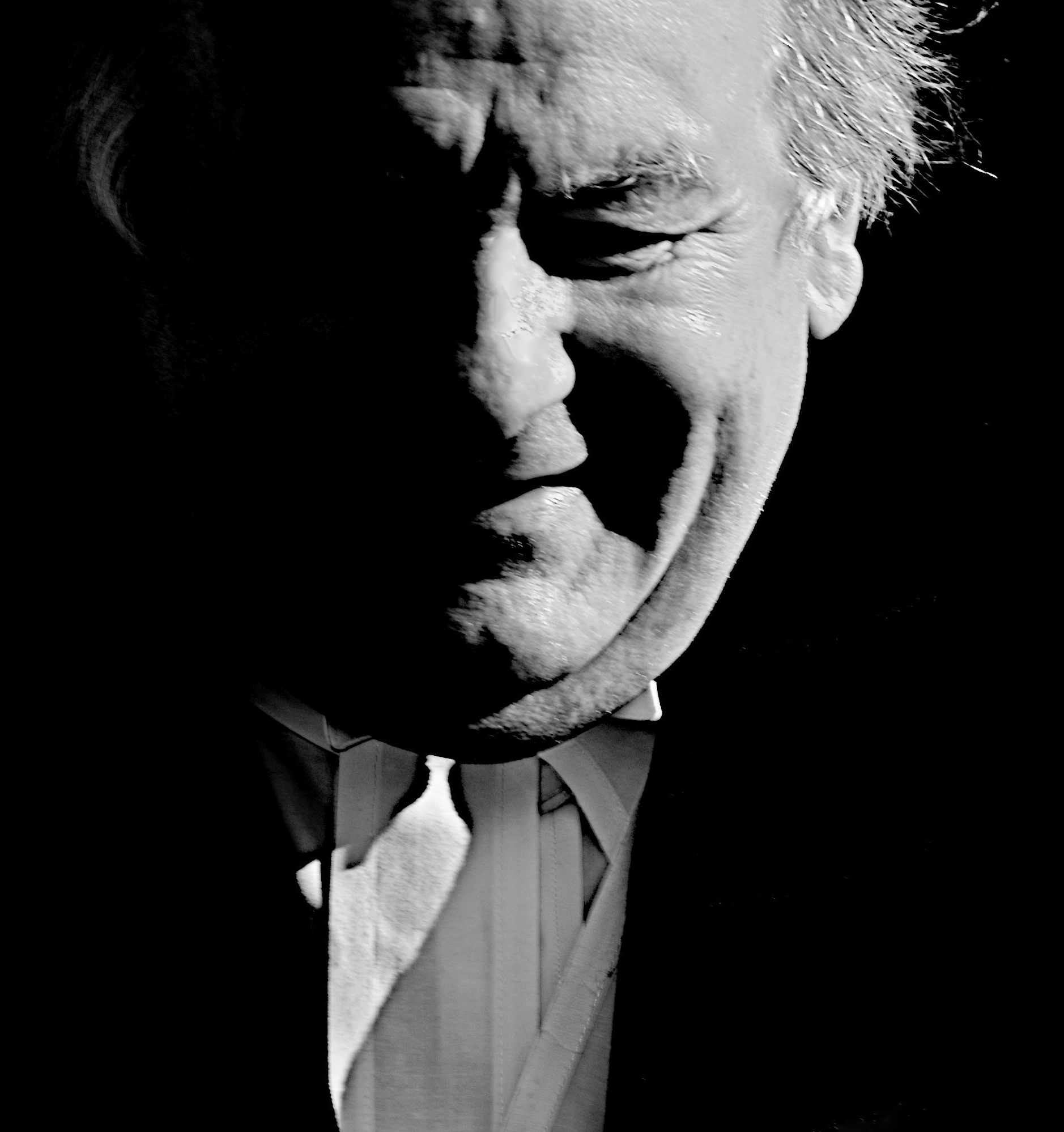
Michael Martin in 2007

- 1 April
  - Edward Digby, 12th Baron Digby, 93, British peer and Army officer.
- 4 April
  - John Lynch, 91, British historian of Latin America.
  - Ray Wilkins, 61, English footballer and coach.
- 5 April
  - Eric Bristow, 60, English Hall of Fame darts player, world champion (1980, 1981, 1984, 1985, 1986), heart attack.
- 8 April
  - Sir Peter Le Cheminant, 97, British Air Chief Marshal in the Royal Air Force, Lieutenant Governor of Guernsey (1980–1985).
  - John Miles, 74, British racing driver.
- 10 April
  - John Lambie, 77, Scottish football player (Falkirk, St Johnstone) and manager (Partick Thistle).
  - Len Tingle, 63, BBC Yorkshire political editor, cancer.
- 11 April
  - Gillian Ayres, 88, British abstract artist.
  - Robert Matthews, 56, British Paralympic athlete.
- 12 April
  - Alex Beckett, 35, English actor (Twenty Twelve, W1A, Youth).
  - Dame Daphne Sheldrick, 83, British-Kenyan elephant conservationist, breast cancer.
- 13 April
  - Ron Cooper, 79, English professional footballer (Peterborough United).
- 14 April
  - Neil Shand, 84, British comedy writer (Q..., The Russ Abbot Show) and journalist (Daily Mail).
- 15 April
  - Stan Reynolds, 92, British jazz musician.
- 18 April
  - Dale Winton, 62, English radio DJ and television presenter (Dale's Supermarket Sweep, Hole in the Wall, The National Lottery: In It to Win It).
- 19 April
  - Stuart Colman, 73, English musician, record producer and broadcaster, cancer.
- 20 April
  - Roy Bentley, 93, British football player (Chelsea, Fulham, national team).
- 21 April
  - Les Pearce, 94, Welsh rugby league player and coach (Halifax).
- 22 April
  - Roy Haggerty, 58, English rugby league player (St Helens, Barrow).
  - Gary Jordan, English rugby league footballer of the 1960s and 1970s.
- 23 April
  - Matt Campbell, 29, British television chef (MasterChef: The Professionals).
  - Barrie Williams, 79, British football coach and manager (Sutton United).
- 24 April
  - Rick Dickinson, 69, British industrial designer, cancer.
  - Emma Smith, 94, English author (Maidens' Trip).
- 25 April
  - Dick Bate, 71, British football manager (Southend United).
  - Edith MacArthur, 92, Scottish actress (Take the High Road). (death announced on this date)
- 27 April
  - Roy Young, 81, British singer and pianist.
- 28 April
  - Alfie Evans, 1, centre of a legal battle to save his life.
- 29 April
  - Michael Martin, Baron Martin of Springburn, 72, British politician, MP (1979–2009) and Speaker of the House of Commons (2000–2009).

=== May ===
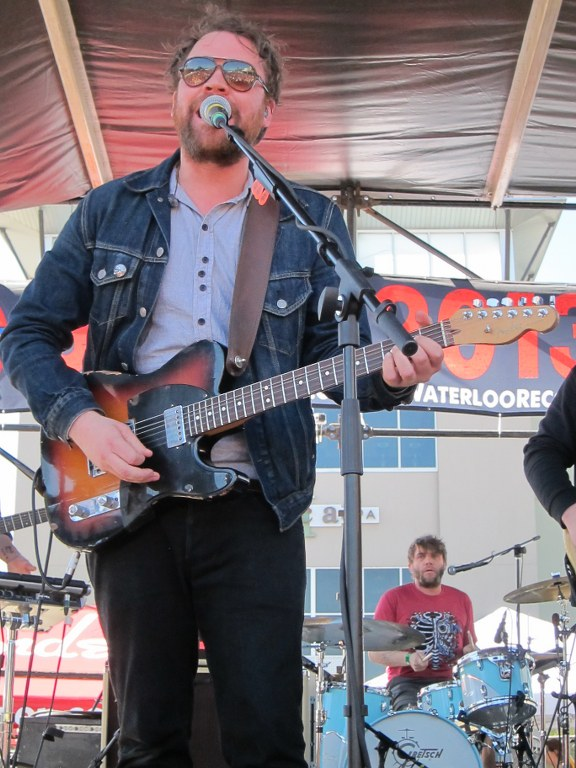
Scott Hutchison in 2013

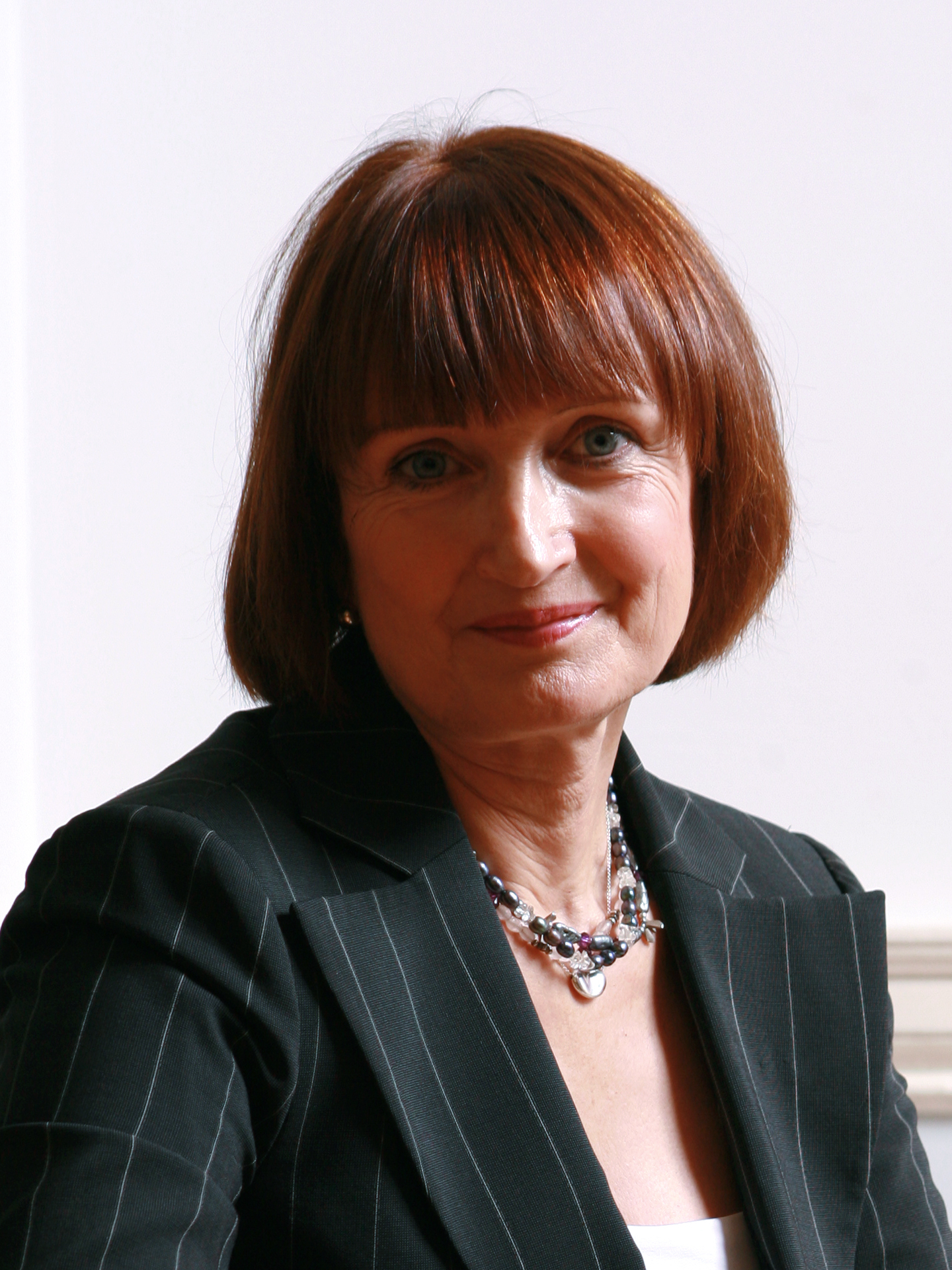
Tessa Jowell

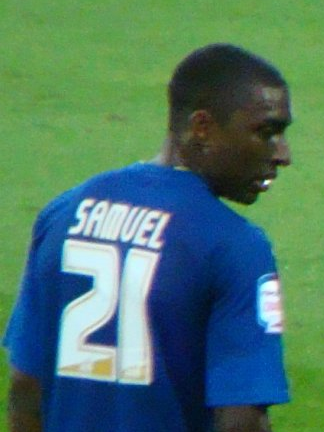
Jlloyd Samuel in 2013

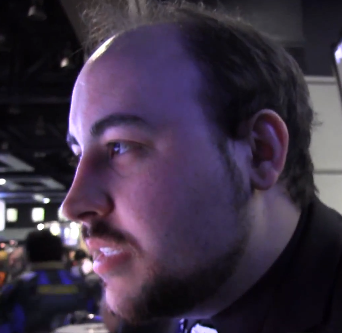
TotalBiscuit in 2012

- 1 May
  - Reg Gadney, 77, British author.
  - Charlie Stone (rugby league), 67–68, English rugby league footballer (Hull FC, Featherstone Rovers)
  - Peter Temple-Morris, 80, British politician and life peer, MP for Leominster (1974–2001).
- 2 May
  - Cliff Watson, 78, English rugby league footballer (St Helens, Cronulla-Sutherland, national team), cancer.
- 4 May
  - Steve Coy, 56, British musician (Dead or Alive).
  - Patricia Lascelles, Countess of Harewood, 91, Australian-British violinist and fashion model.
- 5 May
  - Robbie Little, 73, British film producer (The Prophecy II, Tsotsi, An American Haunting).
- 8 May
  - Anne V. Coates, 92, British film editor (Lawrence of Arabia, The Elephant Man, Fifty Shades of Grey), Oscar winner (1963).
- 10 May
  - David Goodall, 104, English-born botanist and ecologist
  - Ken Hodgkisson, 85, English footballer (Walsall, West Bromwich Albion).
  - Scott Hutchison, 36, Scottish singer, songwriter and guitarist (Frightened Rabbit, Mastersystem, The Fruit Tree Foundation), drowned in Firth of Forth.
  - Graham Lovett, 70, English footballer (West Bromwich Albion).
- 12 May
  - Will Alsop, 70, British architect, Stirling Prize winner (2000).
  - Dame Tessa Jowell, 70, English politician, brain cancer.
  - Dennis Nilsen, 72, Scottish serial killer.
- 13 May
  - Beth Chatto, 94, British gardener and writer.
  - Gareth Powell Williams, 63, British rugby union player.
- 14 May
  - Peter Byrne, 90, English actor (Dixon of Dock Green) and director.
- 15 May
  - Jlloyd Samuel, 37, Trinidadian footballer (Aston Villa, Bolton Wanderers), traffic collision.
  - Ray Wilson, 83, English footballer (Huddersfield Town, Everton, national team), world champion (1966).
- 17 May
  - Bill Longmore, 79, British civil servant, West Mercia Police and Crime Commissioner (2012–2016), cancer.
- 20 May
  - Colin Morris, 89, British Methodist minister.
- 21 May
  - Thomas McGhee, 89, English footballer (Portsmouth, Reading). (death announced on this date)
- 22 May
  - Michael Banton, 91, British social scientist.
- 23 May
  - Sir Miles Hunt-Davis, 79, British army officer and courtier, Private Secretary to the Duke of Edinburgh (1993–2010).
- 24 May
  - Cliff Jackson, 76, English footballer (Crystal Palace). (death announced on this date)
  - TotalBiscuit, 33, English gaming commentator and game critic, bowel cancer
- 25 May
  - Dean Francis, 44, British boxer, cancer.
- 28 May
  - Neale Cooper, 54, Scottish football player (Aberdeen) and manager.
- 30 May
  - Barry Dodd, 70, English businessman, Lord Lieutenant of North Yorkshire (since 2014), helicopter accident.

=== June ===
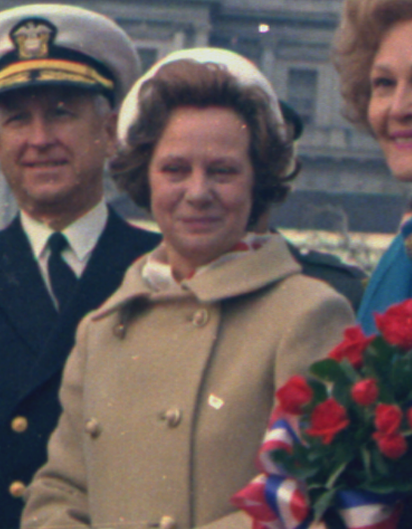
Mary Wilson, Baroness Wilson of Rievaulx in 1970

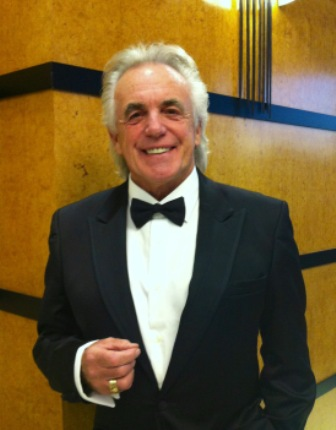
Peter Stringfellow in 2012

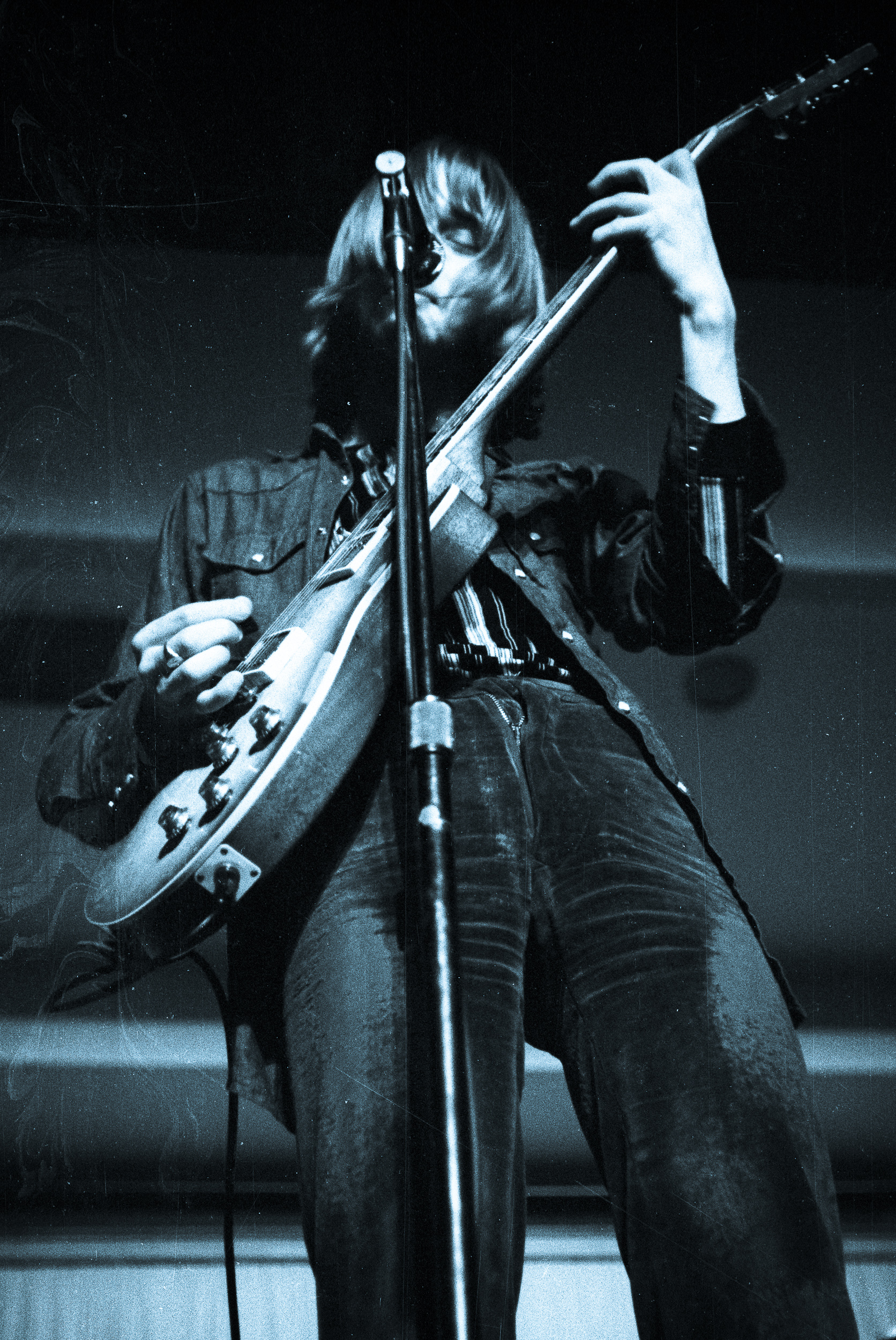
Danny Kirwan in 1970

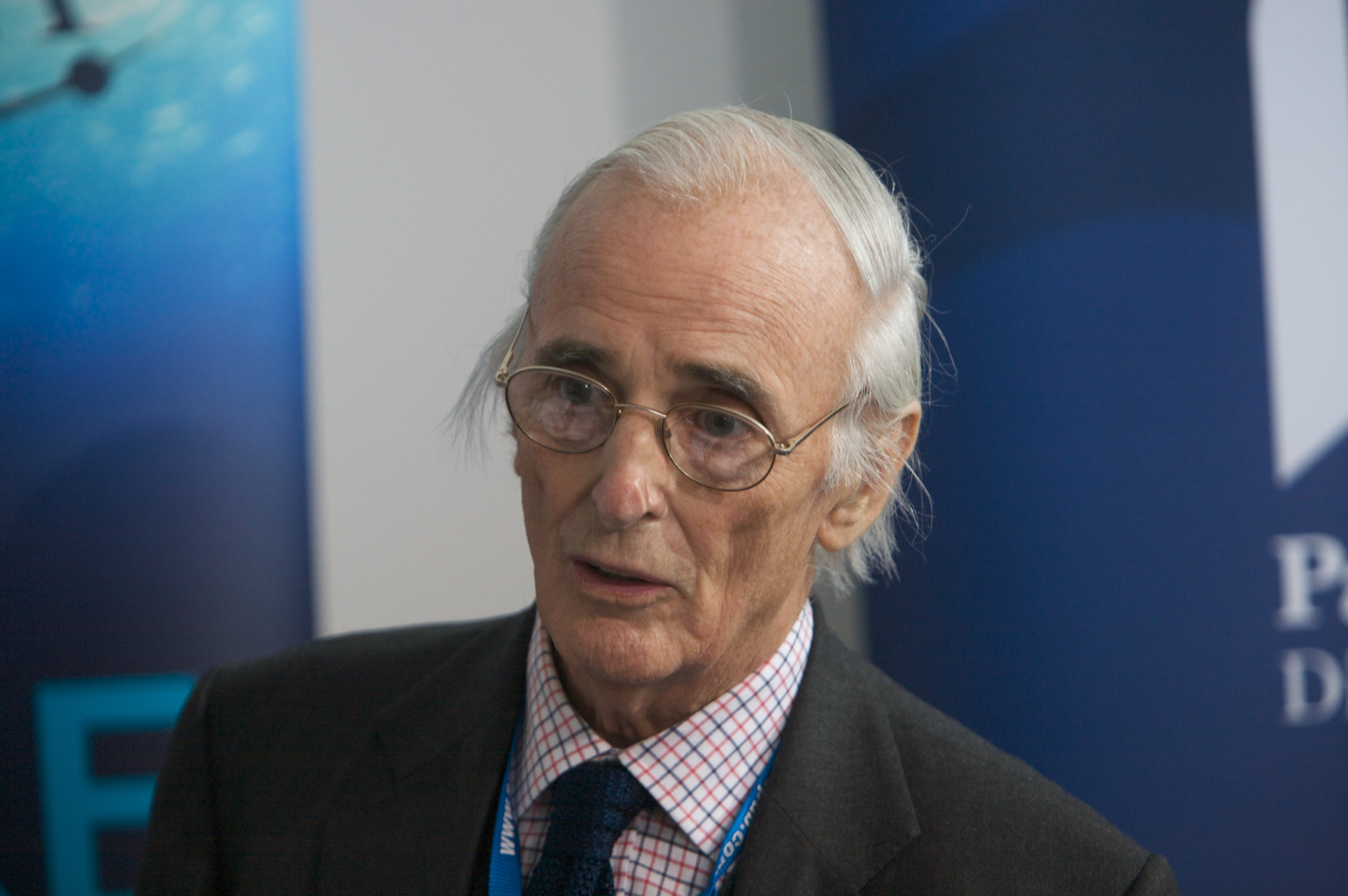
Thomas Stuttaford in 2009

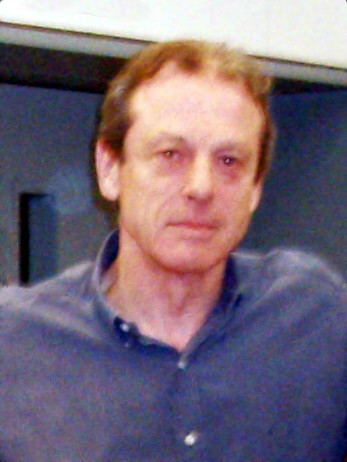
Leslie Grantham in 2007

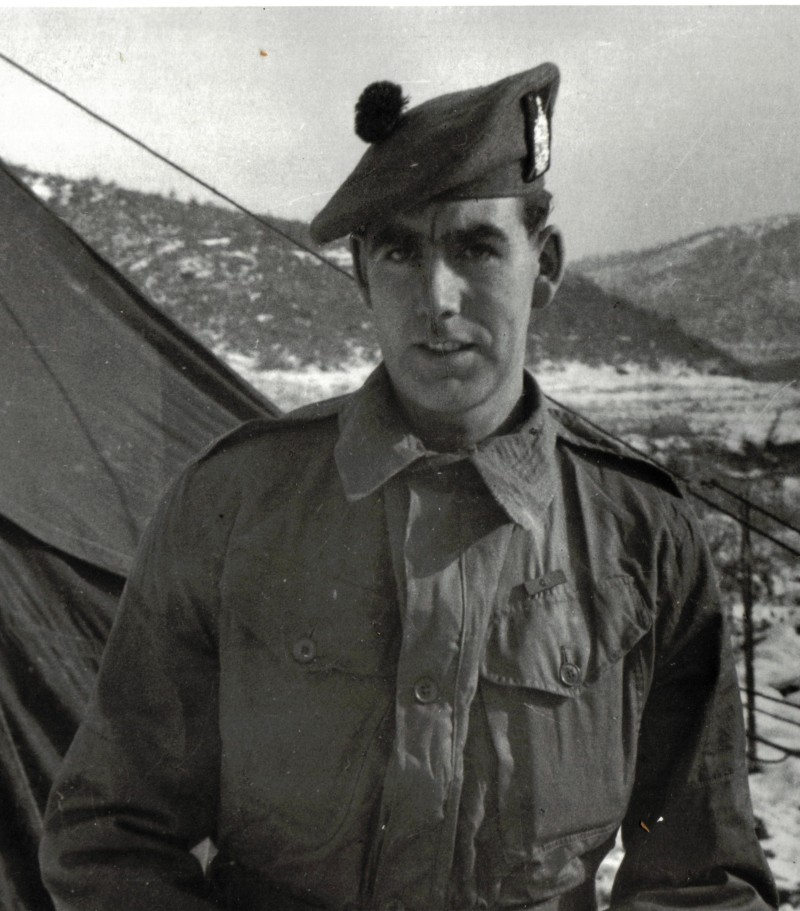
Private Bill Speakman

- 1 June
  - John Julius Norwich, 88, English historian, travel writer and television personality.
- 2 June
  - Malcolm Morley, 86, English painter.
  - John Ritchie, 70, Scottish football player and manager (Brechin City).
- 3 June
  - Doug Altman, 69, British statistician, bowel cancer.
- 4 June
  - Harold Poynton, 82, English rugby league footballer (national team, Yorkshire, Wakefield Trinity).
  - Gareth Williams, 76, Welsh footballer (Cardiff City, Bolton Wanderers, Bury).
- 5 June
  - Denman, 18, British racehorse, Cheltenham Gold Cup winner (2008).
  - Harry Walker, 103, rugby union player.
- 6 June
  - Teddy Johnson, 98, English singer.
  - Harry Walker, 103, English rugby union player. (death announced on this date)
  - Mary Wilson, Baroness Wilson of Rievaulx, 102, British poet, Spouse of the Prime Minister (1964–1970, 1974–1976), stroke.
- 7 June
  - Peter Stringfellow, 77, English businessman and nightclub owner, cancer.
  - Geoff Gunney, 84, English rugby league footballer who played in the 1950s, 1960s and 1970s, and coached in the 1970s.
- 8 June
  - Eunice Gayson, 90, British actress.
  - Danny Kirwan, 68, British musician (Fleetwood Mac).
  - Pat Lally, 92, Scottish politician, Lord Provost of Glasgow (1996–1999).
  - Thomas Stuttaford, 87, British doctor and politician, MP (1970–1974).
- 9 June
  - George Grubb, 82, British politician, Lord Provost of Edinburgh (2007–2012).
- 10 June
  - Stan Anderson, 85, English football player (Sunderland, Newcastle United, Middlesbrough) and manager.
- 12 June
  - Jon Hiseman, 73, English drummer (Colosseum, Colosseum II), brain cancer.
- 15 June
  - Leslie Grantham, 71, English actor (EastEnders, Fort Boyard, The Paradise Club).
- 19 June
  - Nicholas Rudall, 78, British academic and theatre director, colon and liver cancer
  - Frank Vickery, 66–67, Welsh playwright and actor.
- 20 June
  - Sophie Gradon, 32, British beauty pageant winner (Miss Great Britain, 2009) and television personality (Love Island)
  - Ernie Hunt, 75, English footballer (Swindon Town, Wolverhampton Wanderers, Coventry City), complications from Alzheimer's disease
  - Bill Speakman, 90, British soldier, veteran of the Korean War, first recipient of the Victoria Cross from the Queen.
- 21 June
  - Eric Stanley, 94, British historian.
- 23 June
  - Douglas Rae, 87, Scottish businessman.
- 28 June
  - Colin Butts, 58, English novelist, screenwriter and impresario, pancreatic cancer
- 29 June
  - Helen Griffin, Welsh actress (Doctor Who), playwright and screenwriter
  - David Smith, 88, British botanist, Principal of the University of Edinburgh (1987–1994).

=== July ===
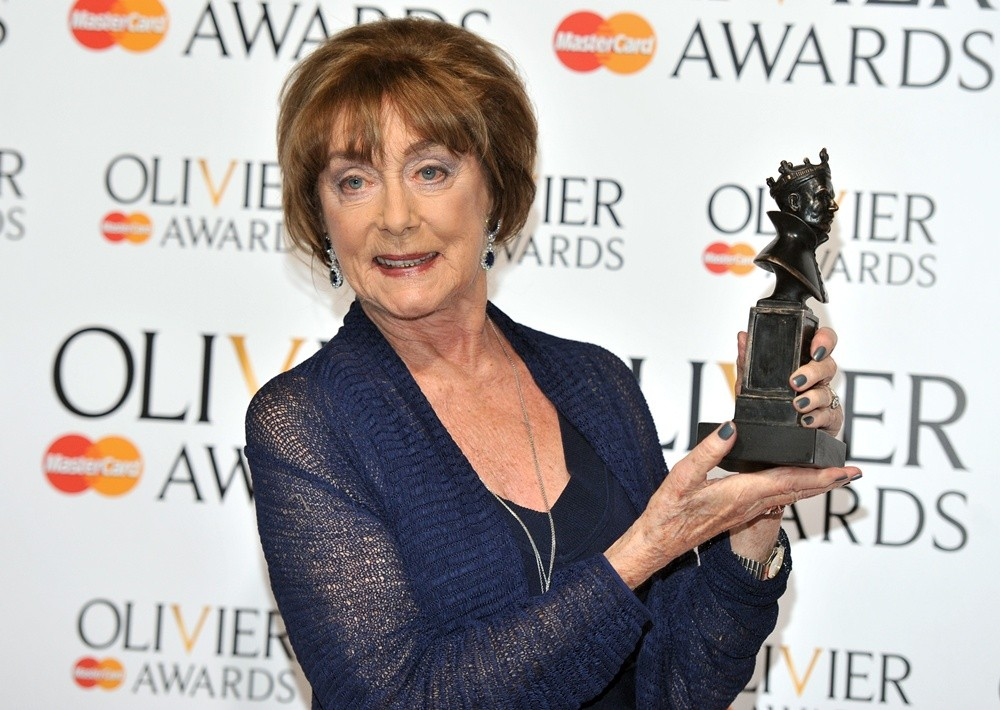
Gillian Lynne in 2013

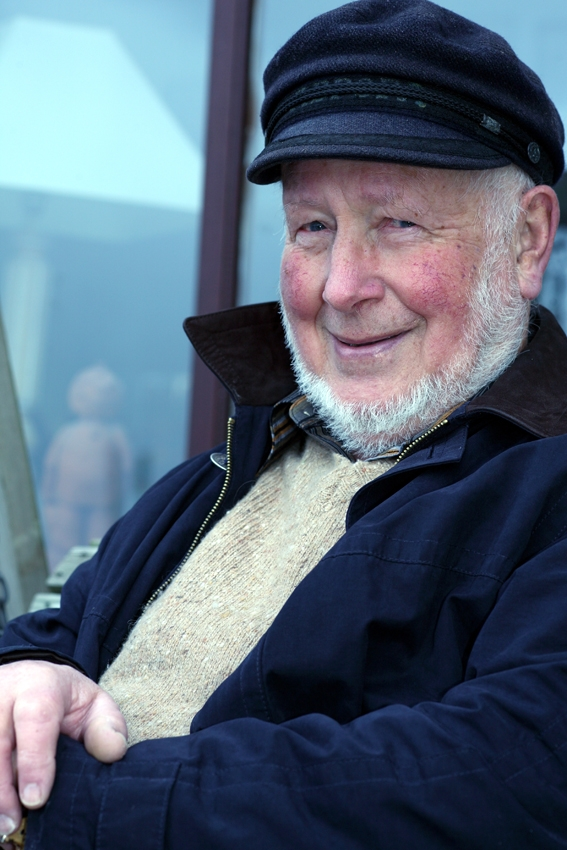
Julian Tudor Hart in 2007

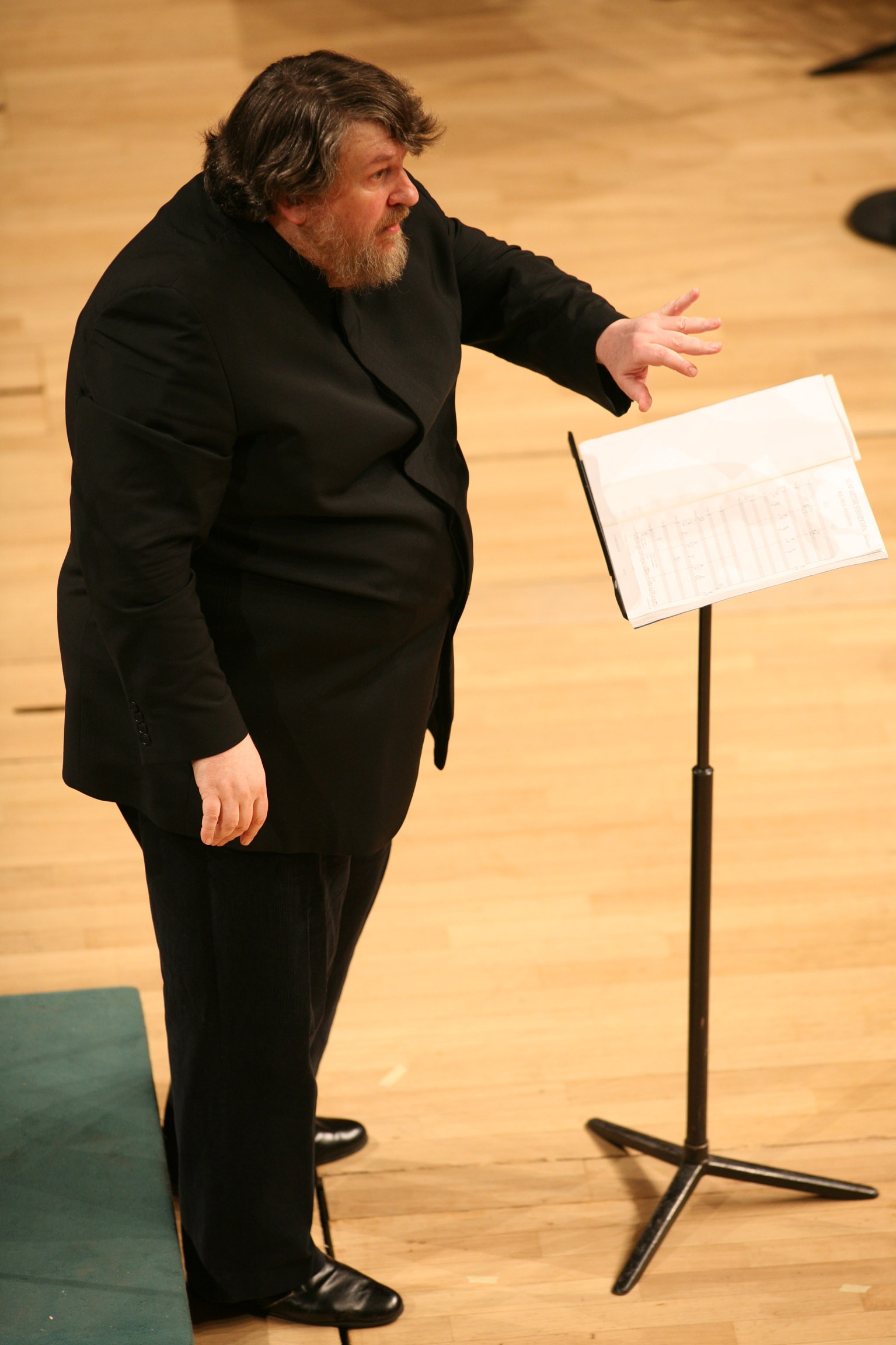
Oliver Knussen in 2008

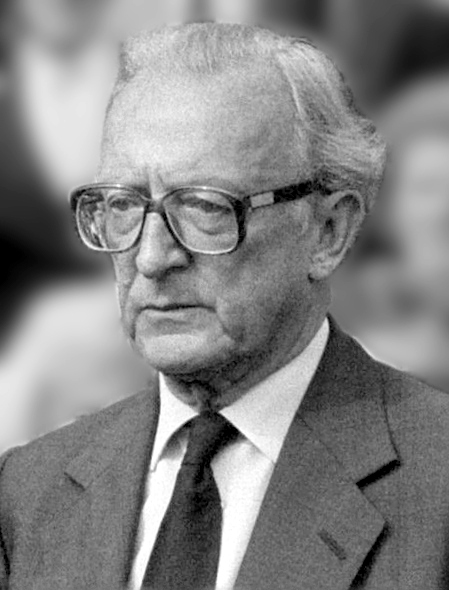
Peter Carington, 6th Baron Carrington in 1984

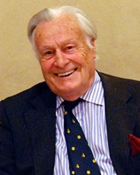
Geoffrey Wellum in 2009

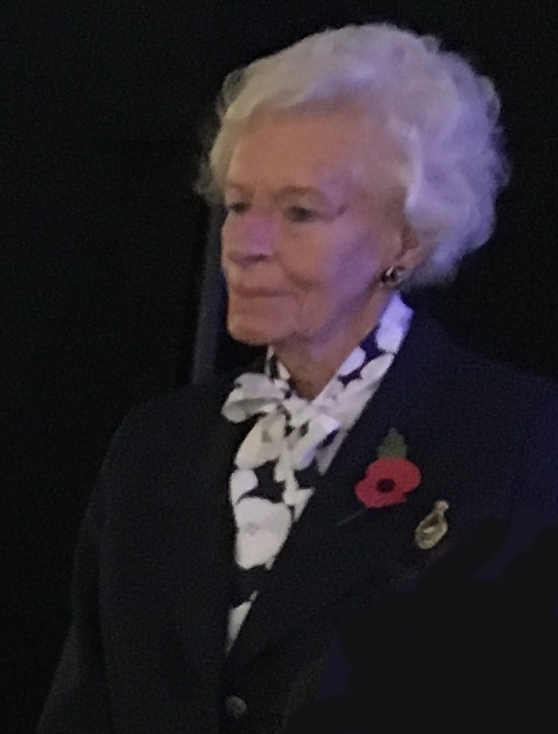
Mary Ellis in 2016

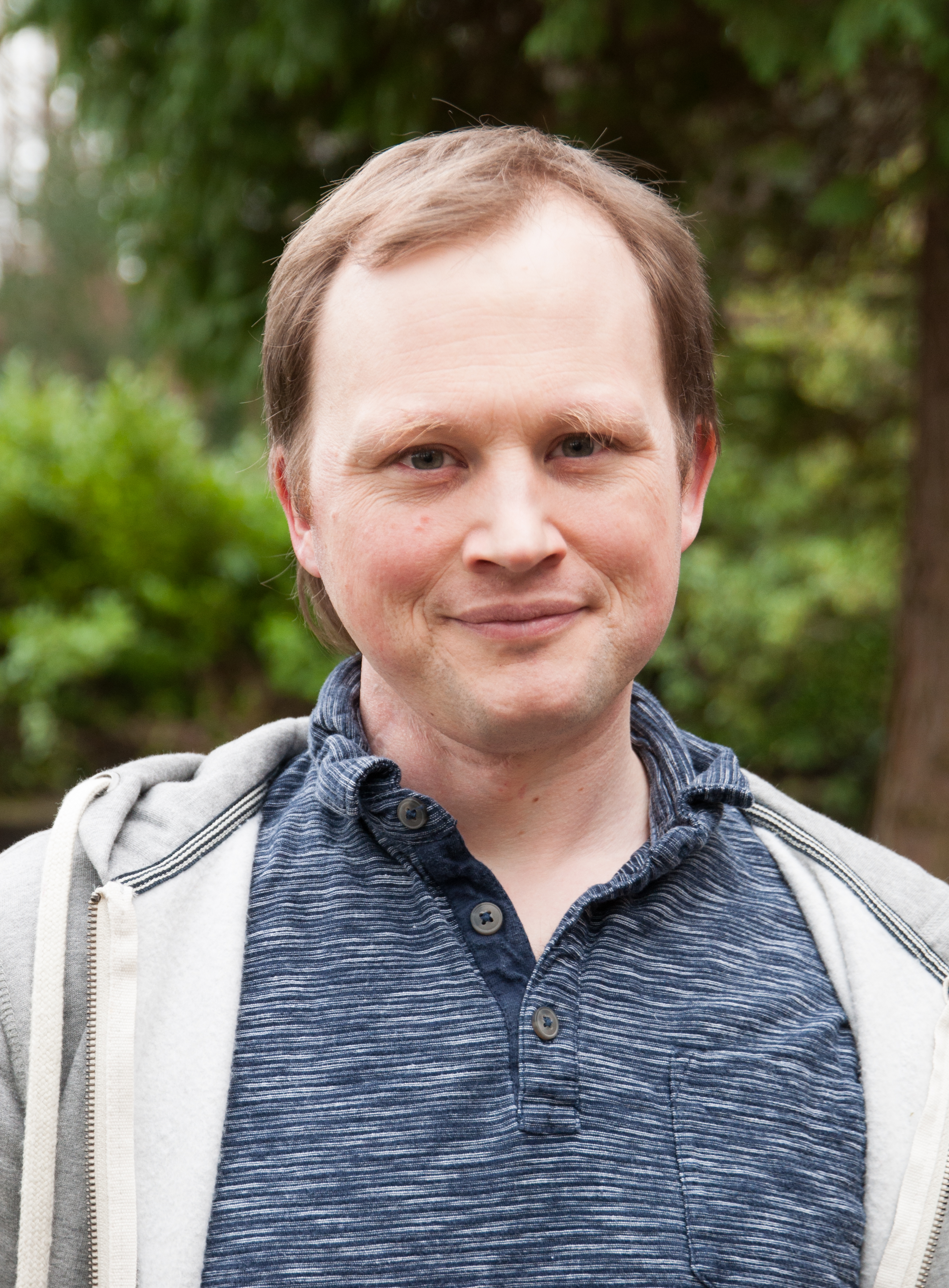
Gervase Markham

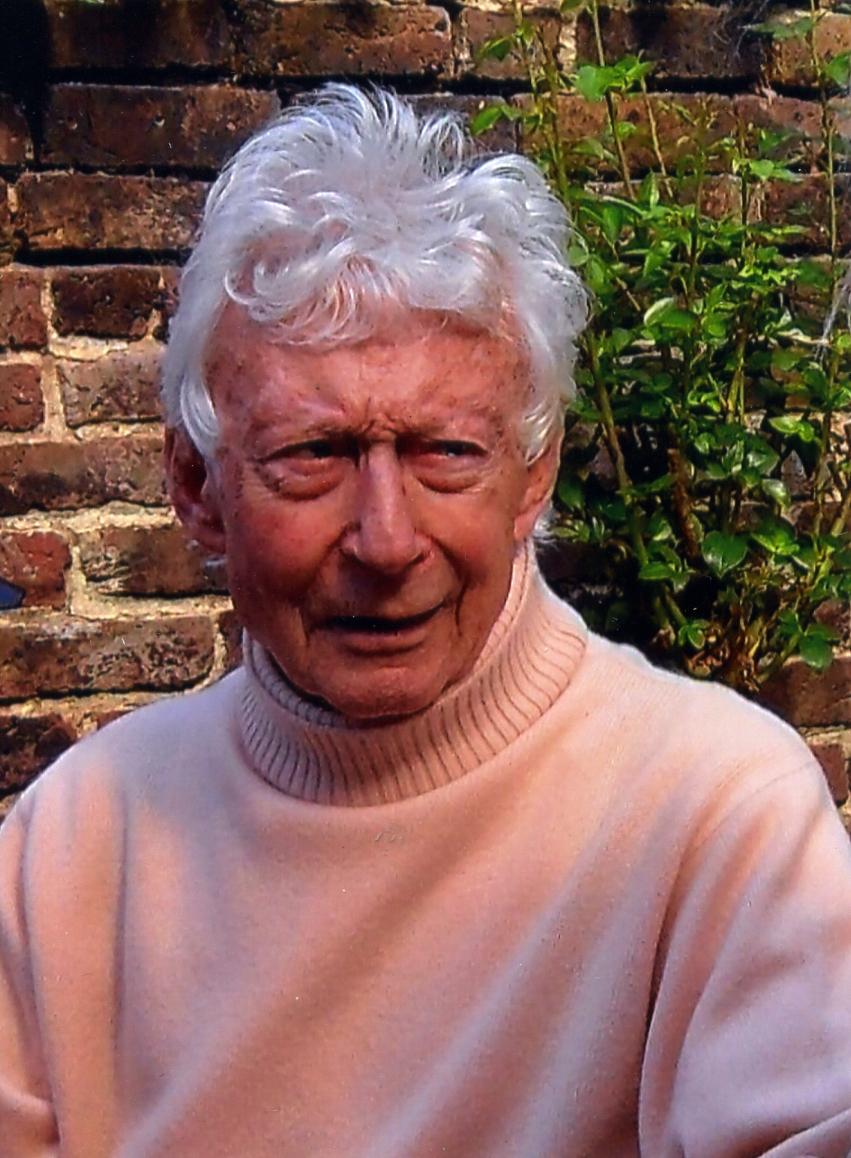
John Goodwin

- 1 July
  - Roy Carr, 72–73, English music journalist.
  - Peter Firmin, 89, English artist and puppet maker (Noggin the Nog, Ivor the Engine, Clangers, Bagpuss, Pogles' Wood)
  - Gordon Hillman, 74, archaeobotanist.
  - Gillian Lynne, 92, English dancer and choreographer (The Phantom of the Opera, Cats, The Muppet Show).
  - Julian Tudor Hart, 91, Welsh physician and writer.
- 2 July
  - Russell Crossley, 91, English footballer (Liverpool, Shrewsbury Town).
  - Alan Longmuir, 70, Scottish musician (Bay City Rollers)
  - Meic Stephens, 79, Welsh writer and editor
- 5 July
  - Kenneth Shearwood, 96, English cricketer (Oxford University, Derbyshire)
- 7 July
  - John Dunlop, 78, English racehorse trainer
  - William Dunlop, 32, Northern Irish motorcycle racer, collision during practice.
  - Peter Sawyer, 90, British historian.
  - Sir Maurice Shock, 92, British educationalist and university administrator, Vice Chancellor of the University of Leicester (1977–1987).
  - Tessa Tennant, 59, British green investment campaigner.
- 8 July
  - Alan Gilzean, 79, Scottish footballer (Dundee, Tottenham Hotspur)
  - Oliver Knussen, 66, composer.
- 9 July
  - Peter Carington, 6th Baron Carrington, 99, British politician, Foreign Secretary (1979–1982), Secretary General of NATO (1984–1988).
  - William Hughes, 20, Welsh amateur boxer and child actor (Doctor Who), suspected suicide.
- 10 July
  - William Hobbs, 79, British fencer and fight choreographer (Willow, Flash Gordon, Rob Roy), dementia.
  - Clive King, 94, English author (Stig of the Dump).
  - John Laird, Baron Laird, 74, Northern Irish politician, member of the House of Lords (since 1999).
  - Jessica Mann, 80, British writer.
- 11 July
  - Barbara Harrell-Bond, 86, American-born British refugee studies academic (University of Oxford).
  - Tom Neil, 97, English fighter pilot (Battle of Britain), member of The Few.
- 12 July
  - J. A. Bailey, 88, English cricketer and administrator, Secretary of Marylebone Cricket Club (1974–1987).
- 13 July
  - Peter Copeman, 86, English dermatologist.
  - Grahame Dangerfield, 80, British broadcaster and naturalist.
- 14 July
  - Alan Ewen Donald, 87, diplomat, Ambassador to China (1988–1991), prostate cancer.
  - Mick Langley, snooker player, Paralympic champion (1988).
  - Davie McParland, 83, Scottish footballer and manager (Partick Thistle, Queen's Park, Hamilton).
- 15 July
  - Trevor Brewer, 87, Welsh rugby union player (Newport, London Welsh, national team).
- 17 July
  - Hugh Whitemore, 82, English playwright and screenwriter (84 Charing Cross Road, The Final Days, The Gathering Storm).
- 18 July
  - Anne Olivier Bell, 102, English literary editor and art scholar, member of the Monuments Men Brigade.
  - Geoffrey Wellum, 96, English fighter pilot and author.
- 19 July
  - Michael Howells, 61, British production designer (Victoria, Ever After, Nanny McPhee).
- 21 July
  - Allan Ball, 75, English footballer (Queen of the South).
  - Peter Blake, 69, Scottish actor (Dear John).
  - Don McCarthy, 63, British entrepreneur and philanthropist, chairman of House of Fraser (2006–2014).
- 22 July
  - June Jacobs, 88, British peace activist.
- 23 July
  - Helen Burns, 101, English actress.
  - Lucy Ferry, 58, British model (Robert Mapplethorpe) and socialite.
  - Paul Madeley, 73, English footballer (Leeds United, England national team).
- 24 July
  - Mary Ellis, 101, English Second World War Air Transport Auxiliary ferry pilot.
  - John Murray, 83, English cricketer (Middlesex, national team).
- 25 July
  - Nick Browne-Wilkinson, Baron Browne-Wilkinson, 88, British judge, Senior Lord of Appeal in Ordinary (1998–2000).
  - Andrew Hopper, 69, British lawyer.
  - Carolyn Jones, 77, British actress (Crossroads).
  - Braham Murray, 75, English theatre director (Manchester Royal Exchange).
  - Ellie Soutter, 18, British snowboarder.
- 26 July
  - Alastair Yates, 66, British news anchor (BBC News, Sky News, About Anglia).
- 27 July
  - Alan Bennion, 88, British actor (Doctor Who, Z-Cars).
  - George Cunningham, 87, British politician, MP (1970–1983).
  - Bernard Hepton, 92, British actor (Colditz, I, Claudius, Secret Army).
  - Geoff Whitty, 71, British educator (UCL Institute of Education).
- 28 July
  - Christopher Gibbs, 79, British antiques dealer.
- 29 July
  - John Goodwin, 97, British theatre publicist, writer and editor.
- 31 July
  - Tony Bullimore, 79, British sailor and nightclub owner.
  - Sir Alex Fergusson, 69, British politician, Presiding Officer of the Scottish Parliament (2007–2011).

=== August ===
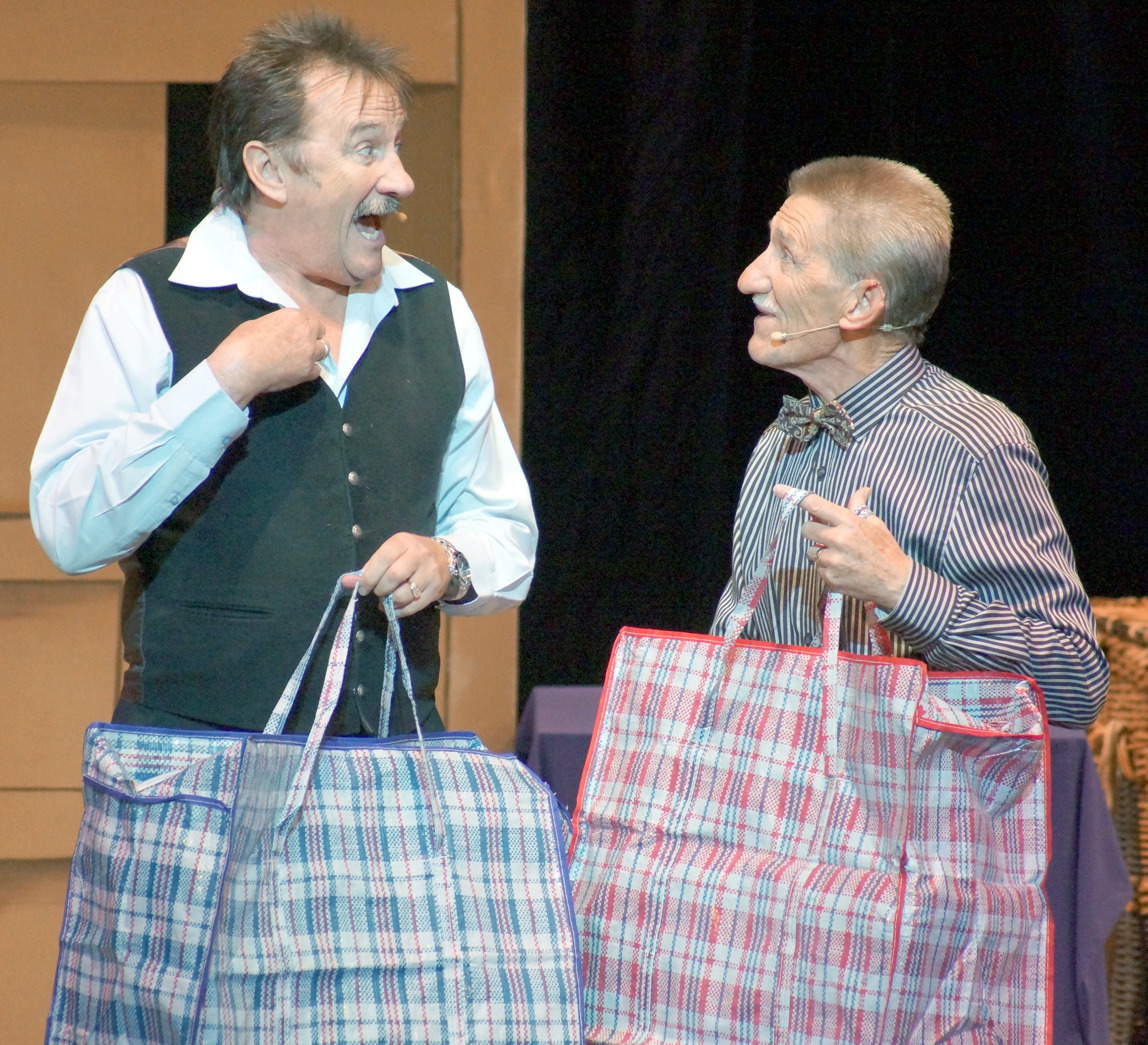
Barry Chuckle (right) with his brother Paul in 2013

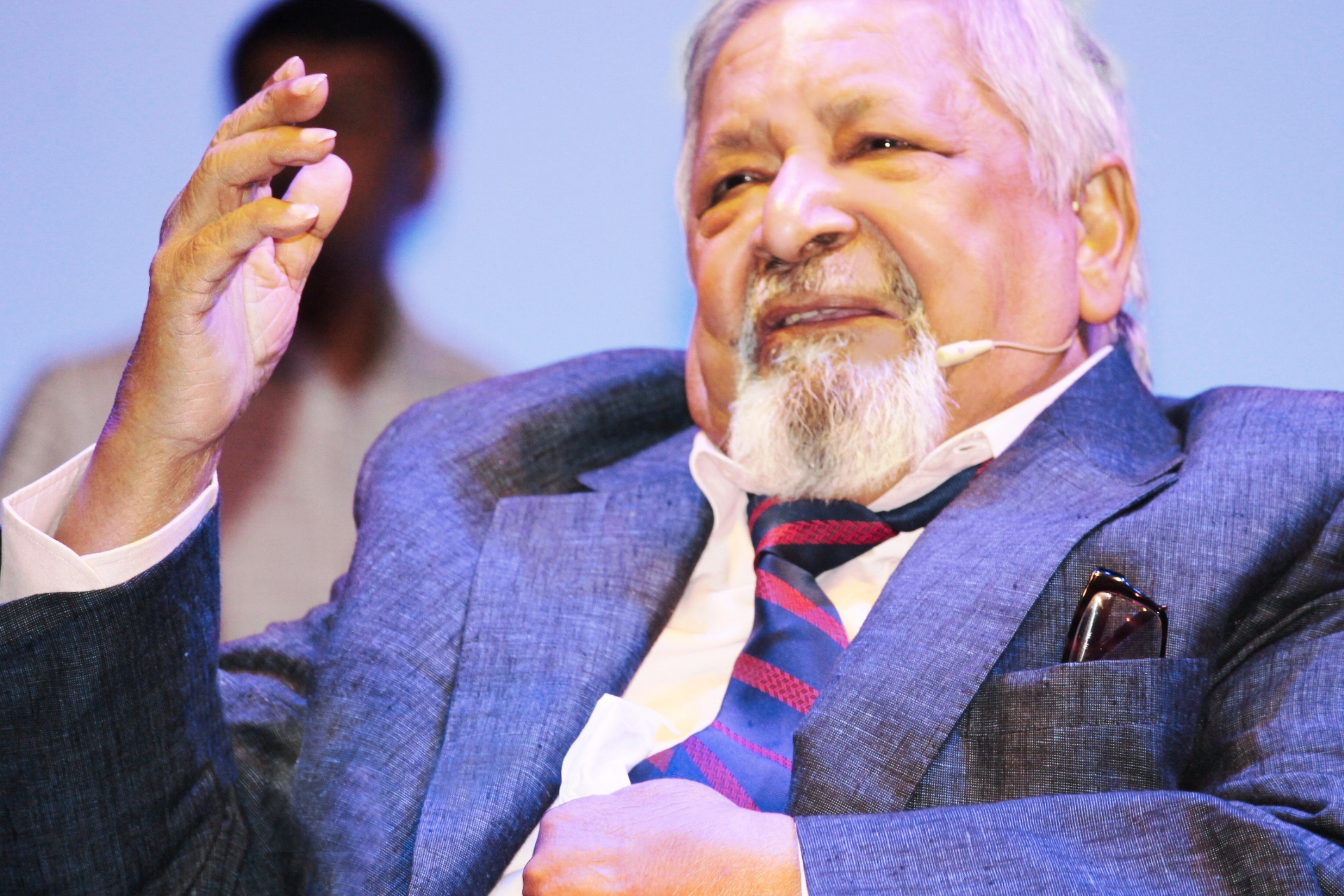
Sir V. S. Naipaul in 2016

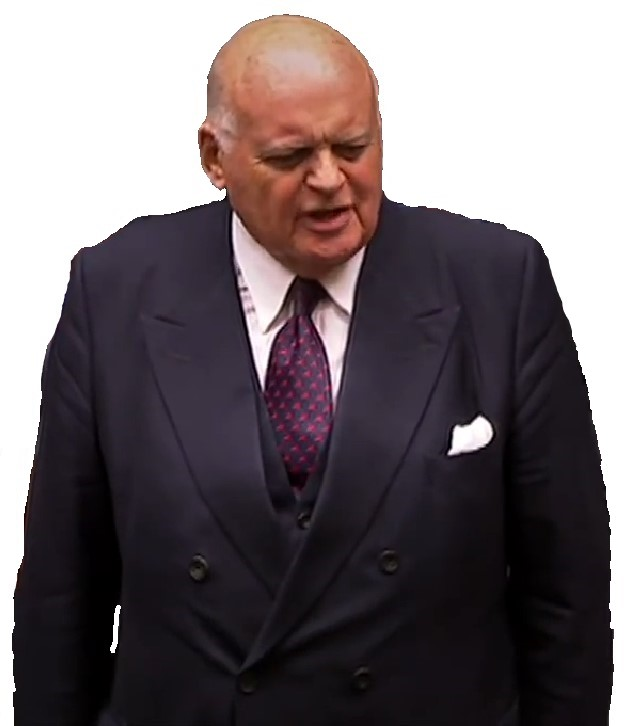
Sir Peter Tapsell in 2012

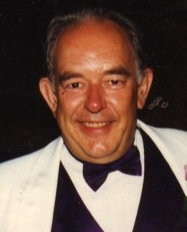
Robin Leach

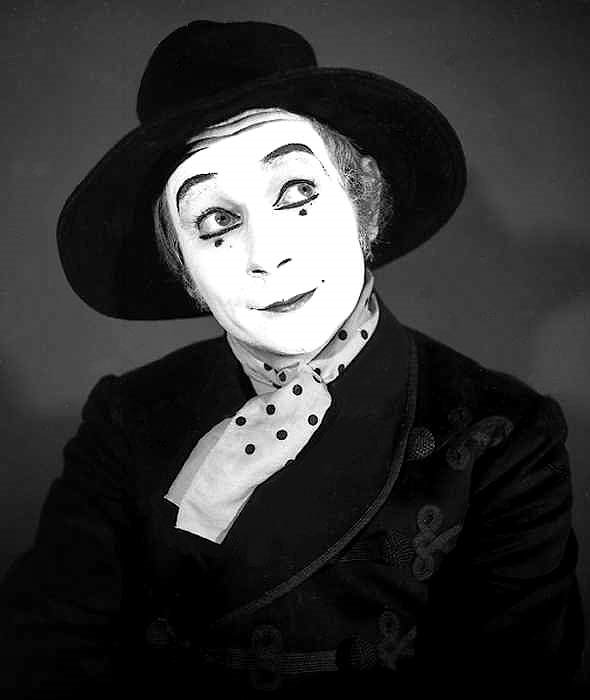
Lindsay Kemp in 2016

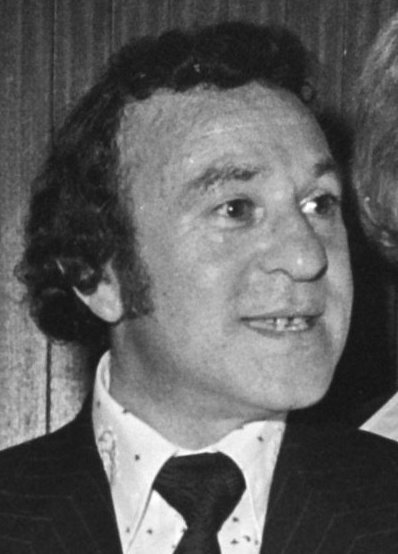
Tony Hiller in 1976

- 2 August
  - Tom Cox, 88, British politician, MP for Wandsworth Central (1970–1974) and Tooting (1974–2005).
- 3 August
  - Terry Bush, 75, English footballer (Bristol City).
  - Cliff Huxford, 81, English footballer (Southampton, Exeter City) and manager.
  - Ronnie Taylor, 93, British cinematographer (Gandhi, Cry Freedom, A Chorus Line), Oscar winner (1982).
- 4 August
  - Donald Hunt, 88, British choral conductor.
- 5 August
  - Barry Chuckle, 73, English children's entertainer (ChuckleVision).
  - Robert Dugard, 76, British speedway rider and promoter.
- 6 August
  - Anthony Catt, 84, English cricketer (Kent).
  - Pete Richens, 65, English screenwriter (The Comic Strip Presents).
  - Dennis Thrower, 80, English footballer (Ipswich Town).
- 7 August
  - David Coates, 71, British political economist.
- 8 August
  - Arthur Davies, 77, Welsh opera singer.
- 11 August
  - Sir V. S. Naipaul, 85, Trinidadian-born British writer (A House for Mr Biswas), Nobel Prize laureate (2001).
  - John Smyth, 77, British barrister.
- 12 August
  - Michael Scott Rohan, 67, Scottish science fiction author.
- 13 August
  - John Calder, 91, Canadian-born British publisher (Calder Publishing).
  - Ian Dean, 48, English professional wrestler (ASW, WCW, NJPW), heart attack.
  - Ann Moss, 80, British literary historian.
- 14 August
  - Sir Hugh Cortazzi, 94, British diplomat, Ambassador to Japan (1980–1984).
- 15 August
  - Martin Brandon-Bravo, 86, British politician, MP (1983–1992).
  - Peter Fisher, 67, British physician, traffic collision.
  - Vivian Matalon, 88, British theatre director.
  - Sir John Shipley Rowlinson, 92, British chemist.
- 16 August
  - Count Prince Miller, 83, Jamaican-born British singer and actor (Desmond's).
- 17 August
  - Jeremy Catto, 79, British historian.
- 18 August
  - Sir Peter Tapsell, 88, British politician, MP (1959–1964, 1966–2015) and Father of the House of Commons (2010–2015).
  - John Townend, 84, British politician, MP (1979–2001).
- 19 August
  - Alan Boyson, 87–88, English muralist and sculptor.
- 20 August
  - Ted Atkins, 60, British mountaineer, climbing accident.
  - Peter Nott, 84, English Anglican prelate, Bishop of Norwich (1985–1999).
- 21 August
  - Donald Mackay, Baron Mackay of Drumadoon, 72, Scottish lawyer and politician, Lord Advocate (1995–1997).
- 23 August
  - Ted Bennett, 93, English footballer (Queens Park Rangers, Watford, Great Britain football team).
  - David Yallop, 81, British author.
- 24 August
  - Robin Leach, 76, British writer and television host (Lifestyles of the Rich and Famous).
  - James Mallinson, 74–75, English record producer.
  - Gordon Riddick, 74, English footballer (Luton Town, Gillingham, Brentford).
  - Sir Adrian Swire, 86, British businessman (Swire).
- 25 August
  - Lindsay Kemp, 80, English dancer, choreographer (Ziggy Stardust) and actor (The Wicker Man, Valentino).
- 26 August
  - Tony Hiller, 91, British songwriter ("United We Stand", "Save Your Kisses for Me", "Figaro") and producer.
- 28 August
  - Olive Boar, 113, oldest person in the UK.
- 29 August
  - Robin Birley, 83, British archaeologist (Vindolanda).
  - Stan Brock, 82, British philanthropist, founder of Remote Area Medical.
  - James Mirrlees, 82, Scottish economist, Nobel Prize laureate (1996).
  - Sir Barry Wilson, 82, British admiral.
- 30 August
  - David Watkin, 77, English architectural historian.
- 31 August
  - Peter Mond, 4th Baron Melchett, 71, British environmentalist and politician.
  - Carole Shelley, 79, British actress (Wicked, The Elephant Man, Robin Hood), Tony winner (1979).

=== September ===
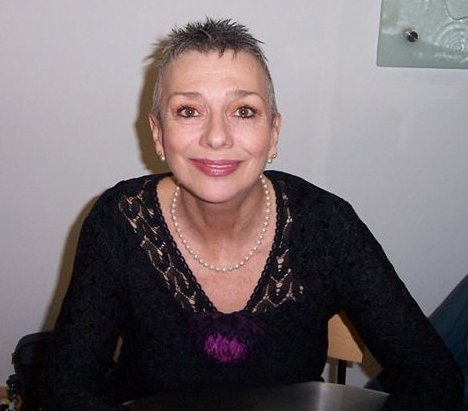
Jacqueline Pearce in 2005

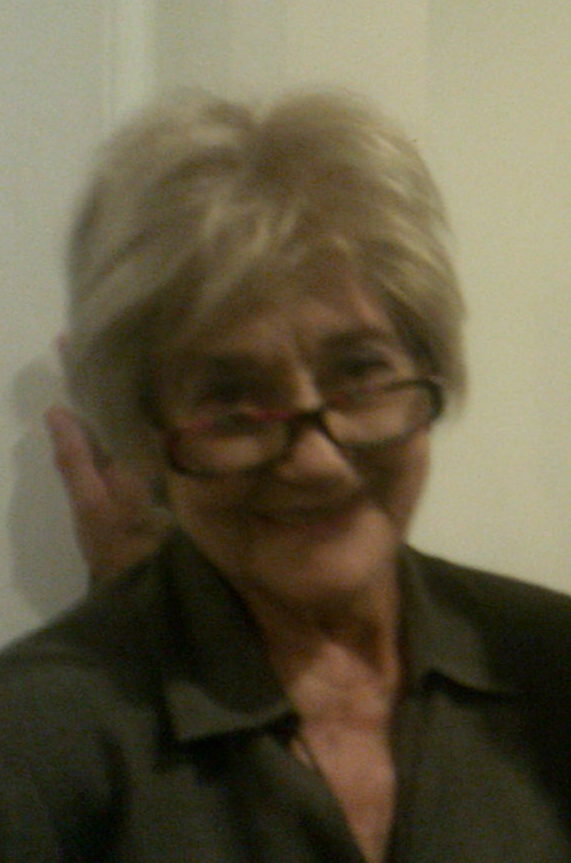
Liz Fraser in 2015

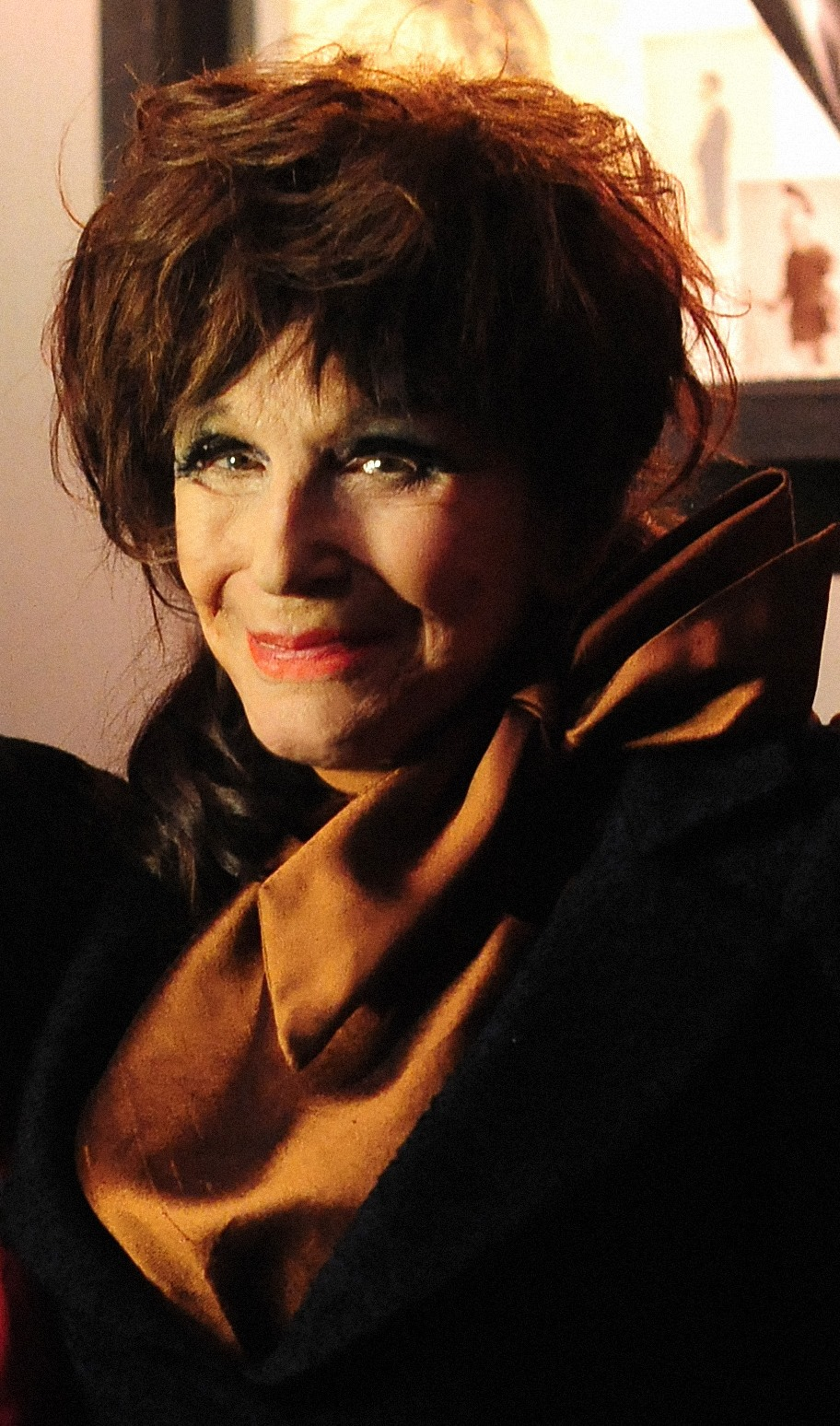
Fenella Fielding in 2017

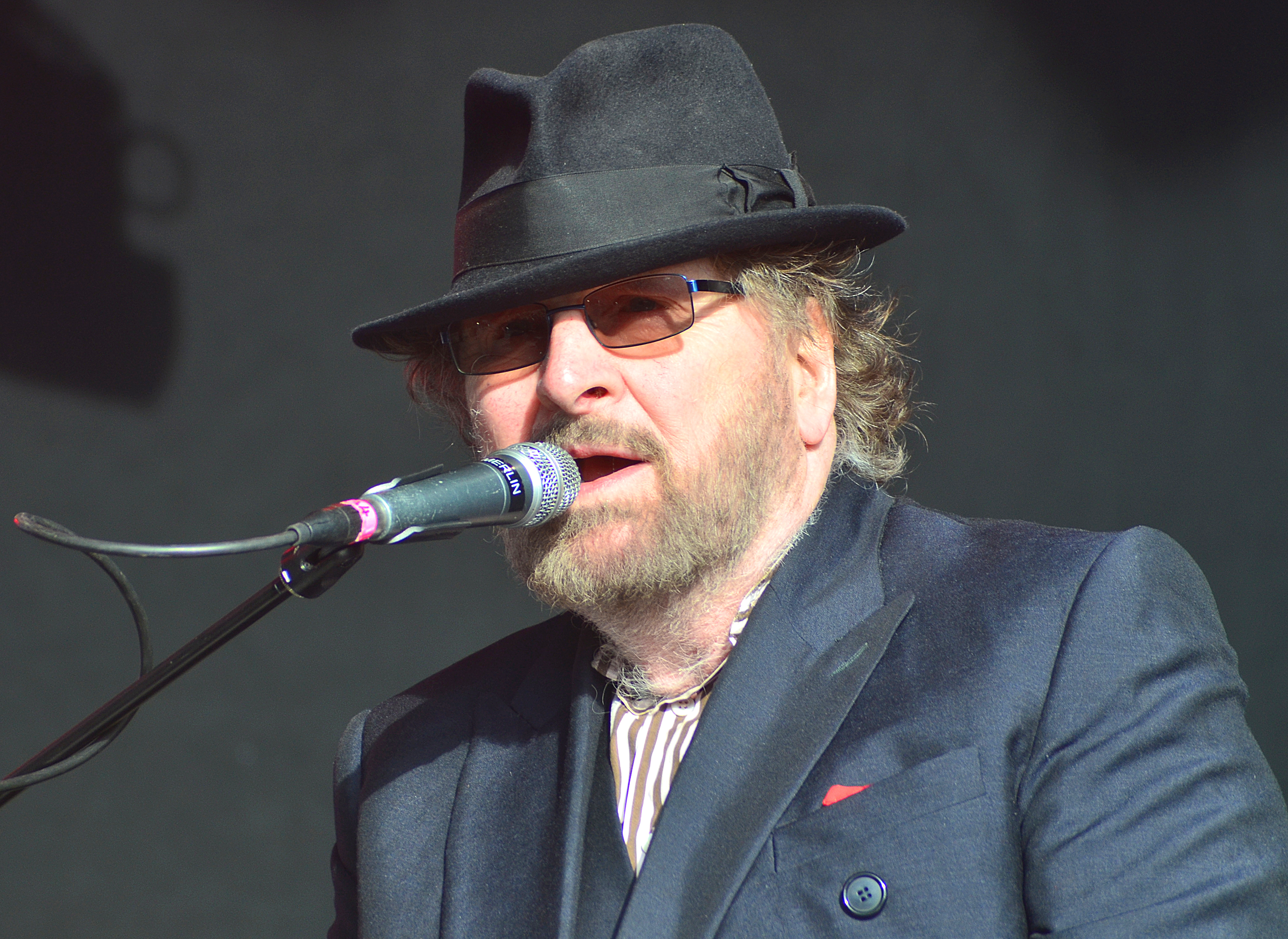
Chas Hodges in 2015

Andrew Colin in 1982

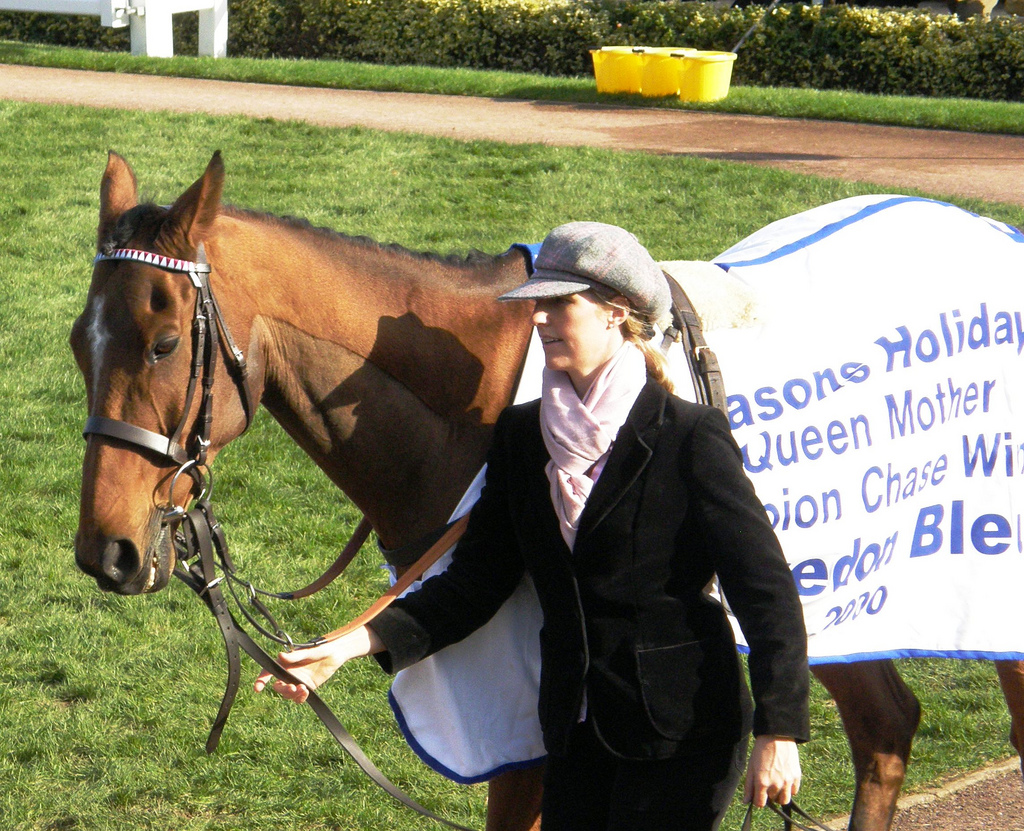
Edredon Bleu in 2007

- 1 September – Kenneth Bowen, 86, Welsh tenor.
- 3 September
  - Jacqueline Pearce, 74, English actress (Blake's 7, Dark Season, Doctor Who), lung cancer.
- 4 September – John W. Rogerson, 83, English Anglican priest and biblical scholar.
  - Gordon Phillips, 72, English footballer (Hayes, Brentford) and manager (Staines Town), cancer.
- 5 September
  - Rachael Bland, 40, Welsh journalist and a presenter with BBC Radio 5 Live and BBC North West Tonight, breast cancer.
  - Robert Coulter, 88, Northern Irish politician, MLA for Antrim North (1998–2011).
  - Diane Leather, 85, English middle-distance runner.
- 6 September
  - Peter Benson, 75, English actor (Heartbeat, The Black Adder, Albion Market).
  - Ken Eyre, 76, rugby league player (Hunslet, Leeds, Keighley)
  - Liz Fraser, 88, English actress (I'm All Right Jack, Carry On Regardless, Dad's Army), complications from surgery.
  - Johnny Kingdom, 79, English wildlife presenter, tractor accident.
  - Alan Oakman, 88, English cricketer (Sussex).
- 7 September – Sheila White, 69, English actress (Oliver!), heart failure.
- 8 September
  - Christopher Harper-Bill, 71, medieval historian.
  - John Tovey, 85, English restaurateur.
  - Richard Vincent, Baron Vincent of Coleshill, 87, English military officer and life peer.
- 9 September – Bill Smith, 80, English cricketer (Wiltshire, Surrey).
- 11 September
  - Edwin Davies, 72, English football club owner (Bolton Wanderers) and businessman.
  - Fenella Fielding, 90, English actress (Follow a Star, Carry On Regardless, Carry On Screaming!).
  - Roger W. H. Sargent, 91, English chemical engineer.
- 12 September
  - Ronald Carter, 71, linguist.
  - Ralph Prouton, 92, English cricketer and footballer.
- 13 September
  - Sir William Kerr Fraser, 89, Scottish civil servant, Chancellor of the University of Glasgow (1996–2006), Permanent Secretary to the Scottish Office (1978–1988)
  - John Wilcock, 91, English journalist (The Village Voice), stroke.
- 14 September – Zienia Merton, 72, Burmese-born British actress (The Chairman, Doctor Who, Space: 1999)
- 15 September
  - Lady Elizabeth Cavendish, 92, aristocrat and courtier.
  - Helen Clare, 101, British singer.
  - Albert Dryden, 78, English steelworker and murderer, stroke.
  - Dudley Sutton, 85, English actor (Lovejoy)
- 16 September
  - Maartin Allcock, 61, English multi-instrumentalist (Fairport Convention, Jethro Tull, Robert Plant) and record producer, liver cancer.
  - Kevin Beattie, 64, English footballer (Ipswich Town)
  - Tommy Best, 97, Welsh footballer (Hereford United, Cardiff City, Chester)
- 17 September
  - Enzo Calzaghe, 69, Italian-born Welsh boxing trainer.
  - Stephen Jeffreys, 68, playwright (The Libertine, Diana), brain tumour.
- 18 September
  - Steve Adlard, 67, English footballer, cricketer and coach (Marquette Golden Eagles), cancer.
  - James Allan, 86, diplomat, High Commissioner to Mauritius (1981–1985) and ambassador to Mozambique (1986–1989).
  - Ernie Bateman, 89, English footballer (Watford)
- 19 September
  - Sir Louis Blom-Cooper, 92, lawyer.
  - Geoff Clayton, 80, English cricketer (Lancashire, Somerset).
  - Denis Norden, 96, English comedy writer, television presenter and radio personality (Take It from Here, It'll be Alright on the Night, My Music).
- 20 September
  - Maria Bitner-Glindzicz, 55, geneticist, traffic collision.
  - John Cunliffe, 85, English children's book author, creator of Postman Pat and Rosie and Jim.
- 22 September
  - Jo Gilbert, 63, British film producer (Closing the Ring) and casting director, brain tumour.
  - Chas Hodges, 74, English musician (Chas & Dave), organ failure.
  - Sir Eric Yarrow, 98, businessman.
- 23 September
  - Harry Walden, 77, English footballer (Luton Town, Northampton Town)
  - Derek Wheatley, 92, English barrister and legal advisor.
- 24 September − Roy Booth, 91, English cricketer (Yorkshire, Worcestershire).
- 25 September
  - Jim Brogan, 74, Scottish footballer (Celtic), dementia.
  - Andrew Colin, 82, computer scientist.
- 27 September
  - James Lawton, 75, sports journalist and biographer.
  - Ernest Maxin, television producer and choreographer (Morecambe and Wise).
- 29 September – Peter Robeson, 88, equestrian, Olympic bronze medalist (1956, 1964).
- 30 September
  - Edredon Bleu, 26, racehorse and winner of the King George VI Chase (2003), euthanised.
  - Geoffrey Hayes, 76, English television presenter (Rainbow) and actor (Z-Cars), pneumonia.

=== October ===
Brian Hughes

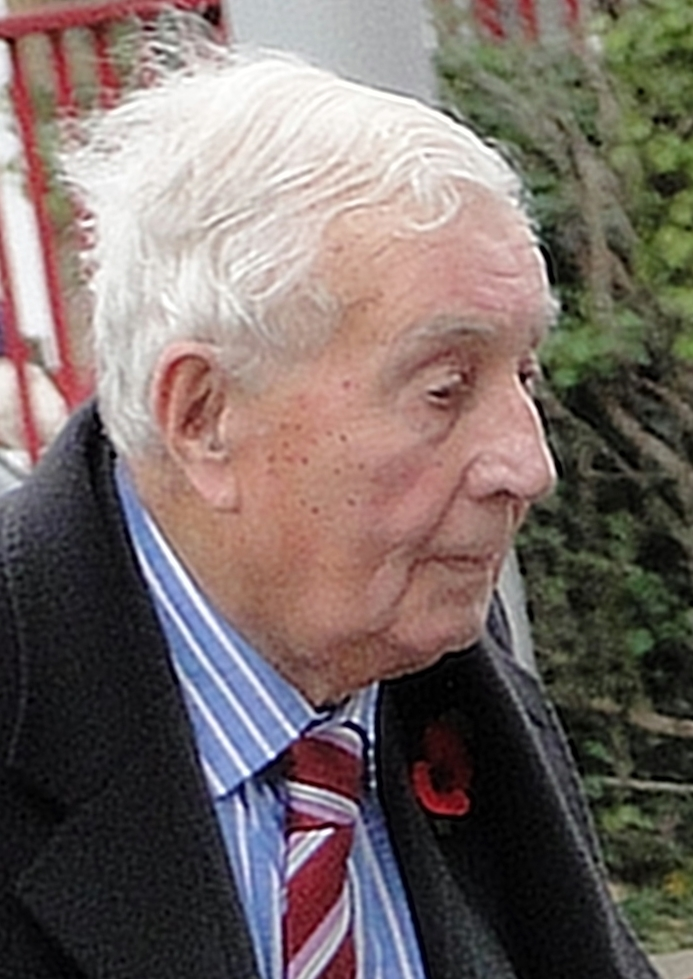
Sir Doug Ellis in 2014

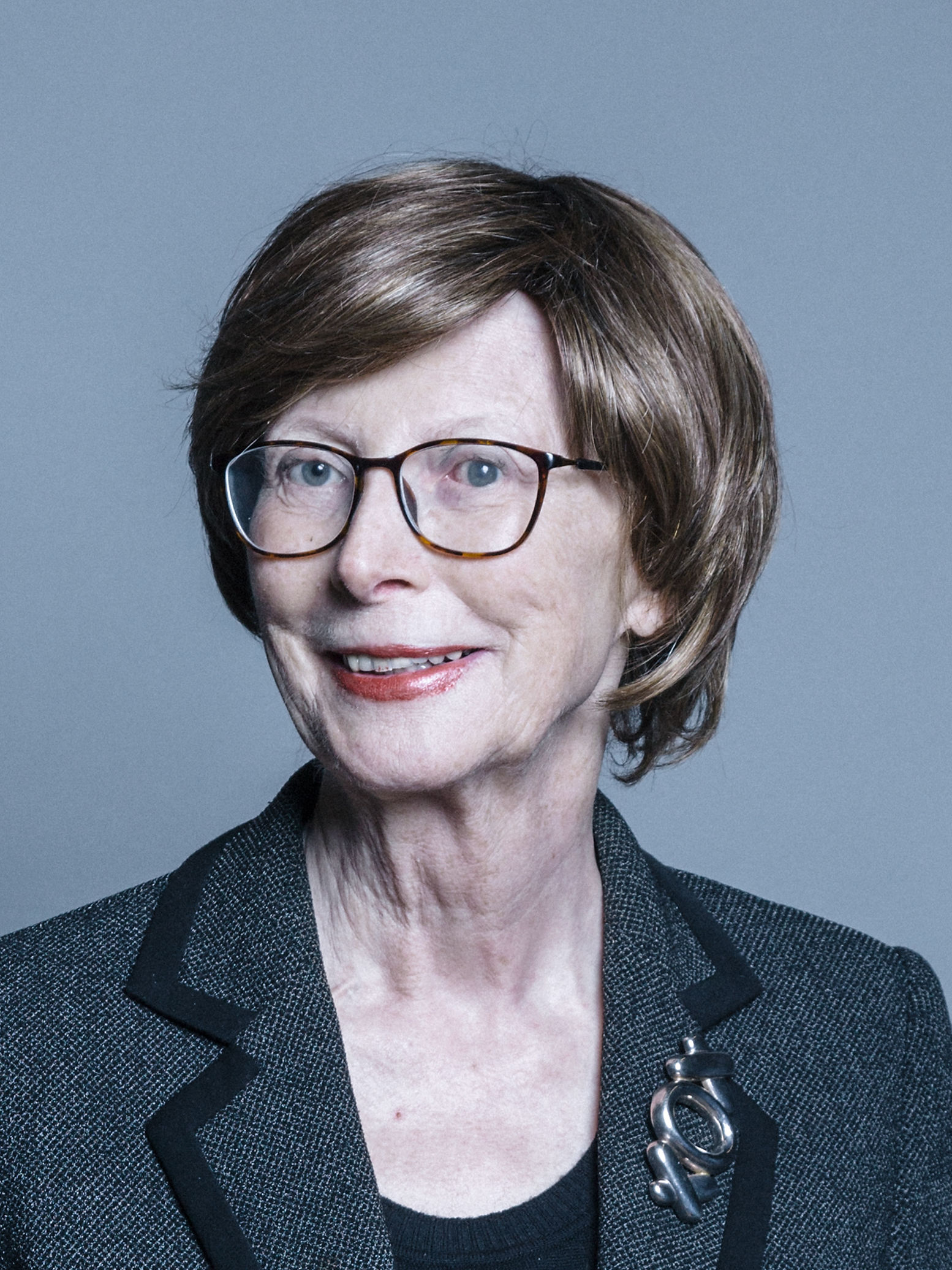
Patricia Hollis, Baroness Hollis of Heigham

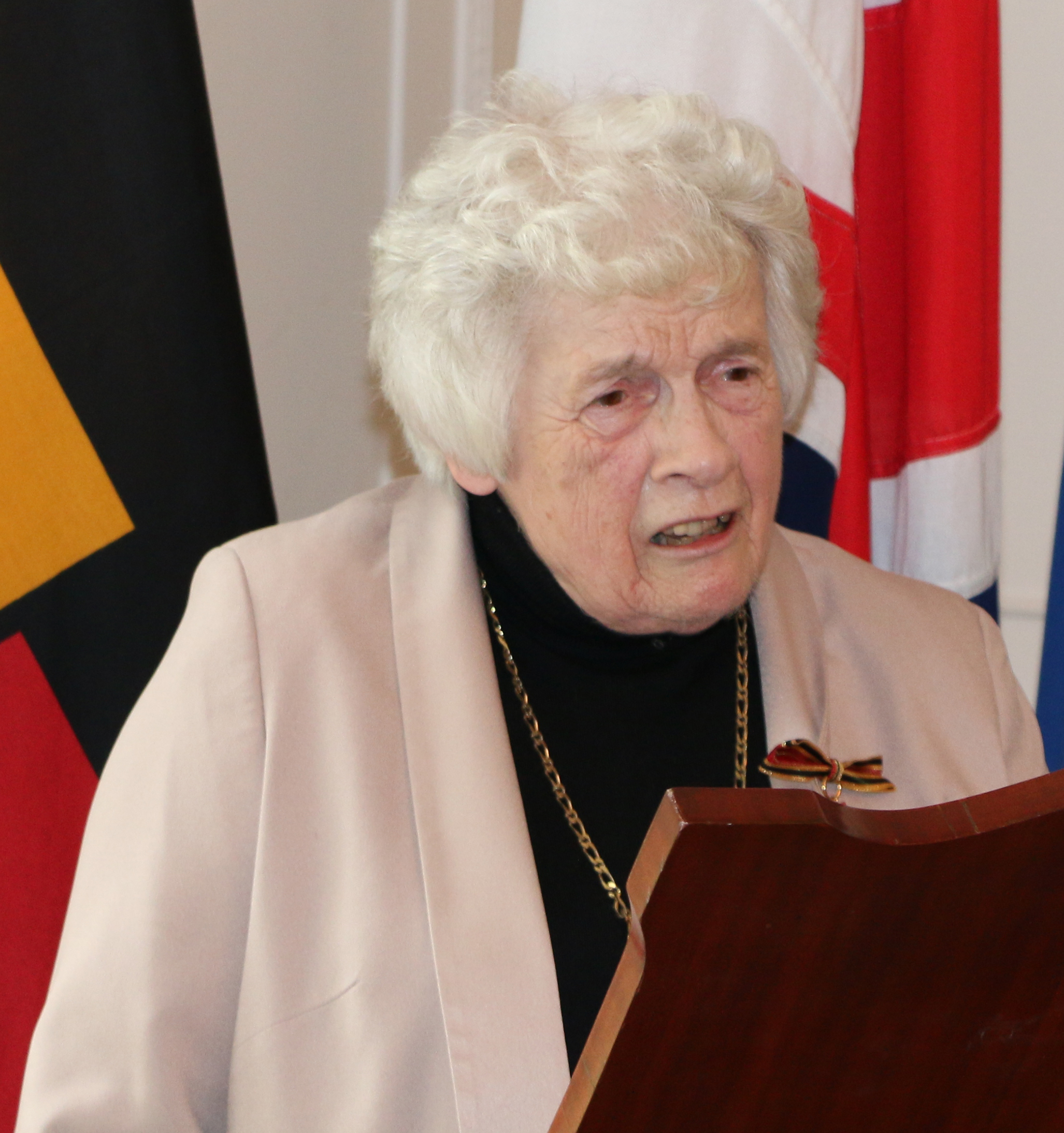
Anthea Bell

- 1 October
  - Ben Daglish, 52, English composer and musician, lung cancer.
  - Michael Freedland, 83, journalist and biographer.
  - Donald Read, 88, historian.
- 2 October
  - Wendy Atkin, 71, epidemiologist.
  - Geoff Emerick, 72, English recording engineer (Abbey Road Studios, The Beatles), multi-Grammy winner, heart attack.
  - Ceri Peach, 78, Welsh geographer.
- 3 October
  - David M. Fergusson, 74, British-born New Zealand psychologist, lung cancer.
  - Sir Roger Gibbs, 83, financier.
  - Peter Wales, 89, Sussex cricketer.
- 4 October
  - Bertie McMinn, 60, Northern Irish footballer (Distillery, Glenavon, Moyola Park), cancer.
  - Sir John Swinton of Kimmerghame, 93, military officer.
  - John Tyrrell, 76, musicologist.
- 5 October
  - Ray Galton, 88, English comedy writer (Steptoe and Son), dementia.
  - Richard Horden, 73, architect, lung cancer.
- 7 October
  - Brian Hughes, 80, Welsh footballer (Swansea City, Atlanta Chiefs).
  - John Wicks, 65, producer, singer and musician (The Records).
- 8 October
  - Neville Chamberlain, 78, Anglican prelate, Bishop of Brechin (1997–2005).
  - Alfred Holland, 91, British-born Australian Anglican bishop.
- 9 October
  - Anna Harvey, 74, fashion editor (Vogue) and stylist (Princess Diana).
  - Tony Hopper, 42, English footballer (Carlisle United), motor neurone disease.
- 10 October
  - Denzil Davies, 80, Welsh politician and MP (1970–2005).
  - Mary Midgley, 99, philosopher.
- 11 October
  - Sir Doug Ellis, 94, English entrepreneur and footballer club chairman (Aston Villa).
  - Jimbo Simpson, 60, Northern Irish paramilitary (UDA), lung cancer.
- 13 October – Patricia Hollis, Baroness Hollis of Heigham, 77, politician.
- 14 October
  - Peter Brackley, 67, football commentator, heart attack.
  - Tom Delahunty, 83, British-born New Zealand football referee, FIFA list (1969–1984).
- 15 October – Charlie Crickmore, 76, English footballer (Hull City, A.F.C. Bournemouth, Notts County). (death announced on this date)
- 16 October – Paul O'Brien, 64, chemist.
- 17 October – Geoff Scott, 61, English footballer (Stoke City, Leicester City, Birmingham) and manager.
- 18 October – Anthea Bell, 82, English literary translator (Asterix).
- 21 October – Robert Faurisson, 89, British-born French academic and Holocaust denier.
- 25 October
  - Ruth Gates, 56, biologist, brain cancer.
  - Norman Sheil, 86, English racing cyclist.
- 29 October
  - Sir Nigel Broomfield, 81, diplomat, Ambassador to Germany (1993–1997).
  - Dave Duncan, 85, Scottish-born Canadian writer (West of January, The Cutting Edge), brain haemorrhage.
- 30 October – Sangharakshita, 93, Buddhist teacher and writer, founder of the Triratna Buddhist Community, pneumonia and sepsis.
- 31 October – Ken Shellito, 78, English footballer (Chelsea) and manager.

=== November ===
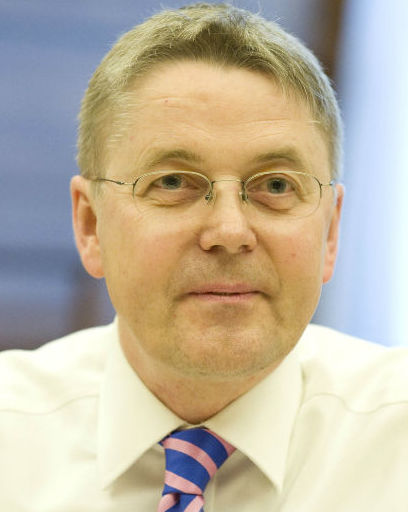
Jeremy Heywood in 2015

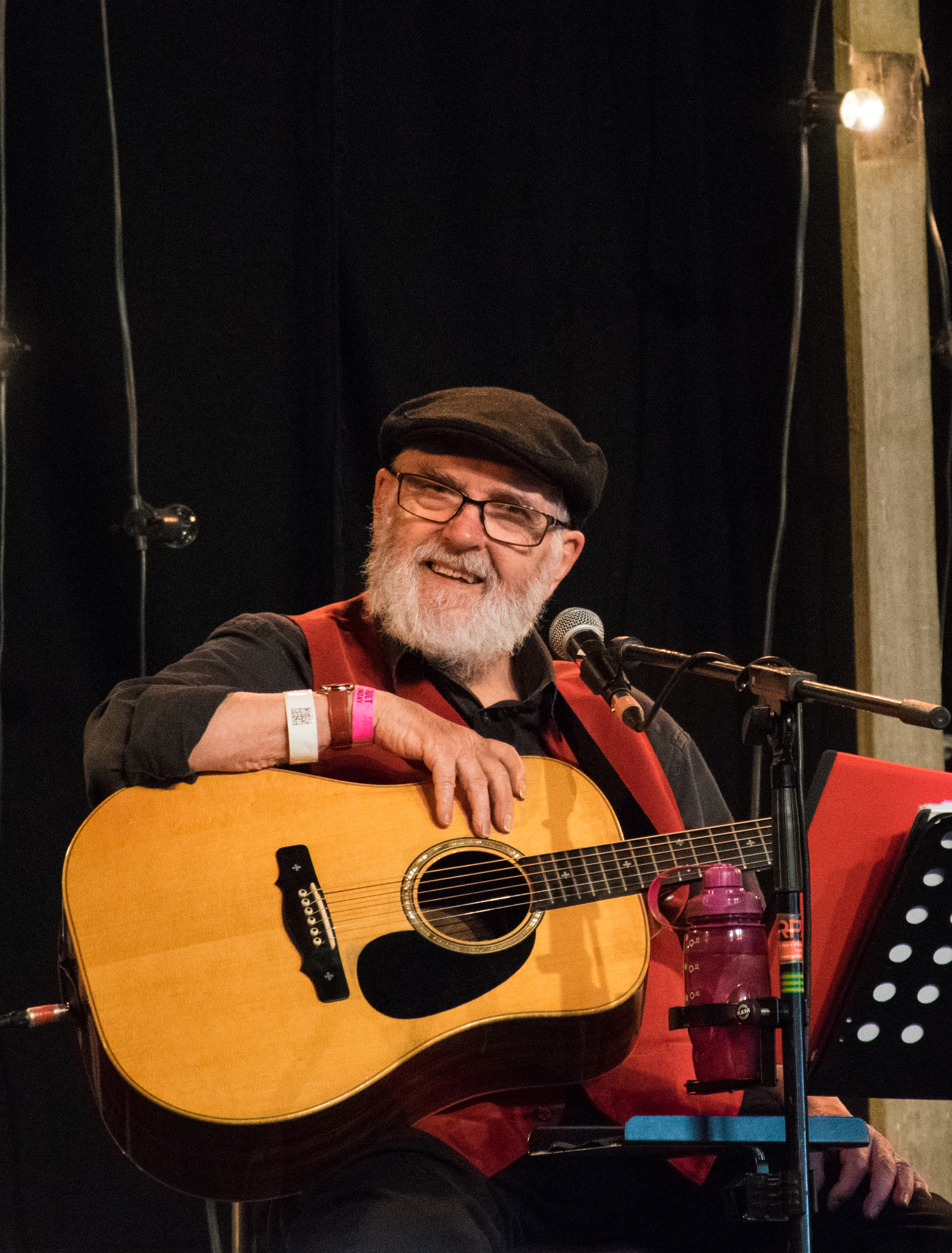
Roy Bailey in 2018

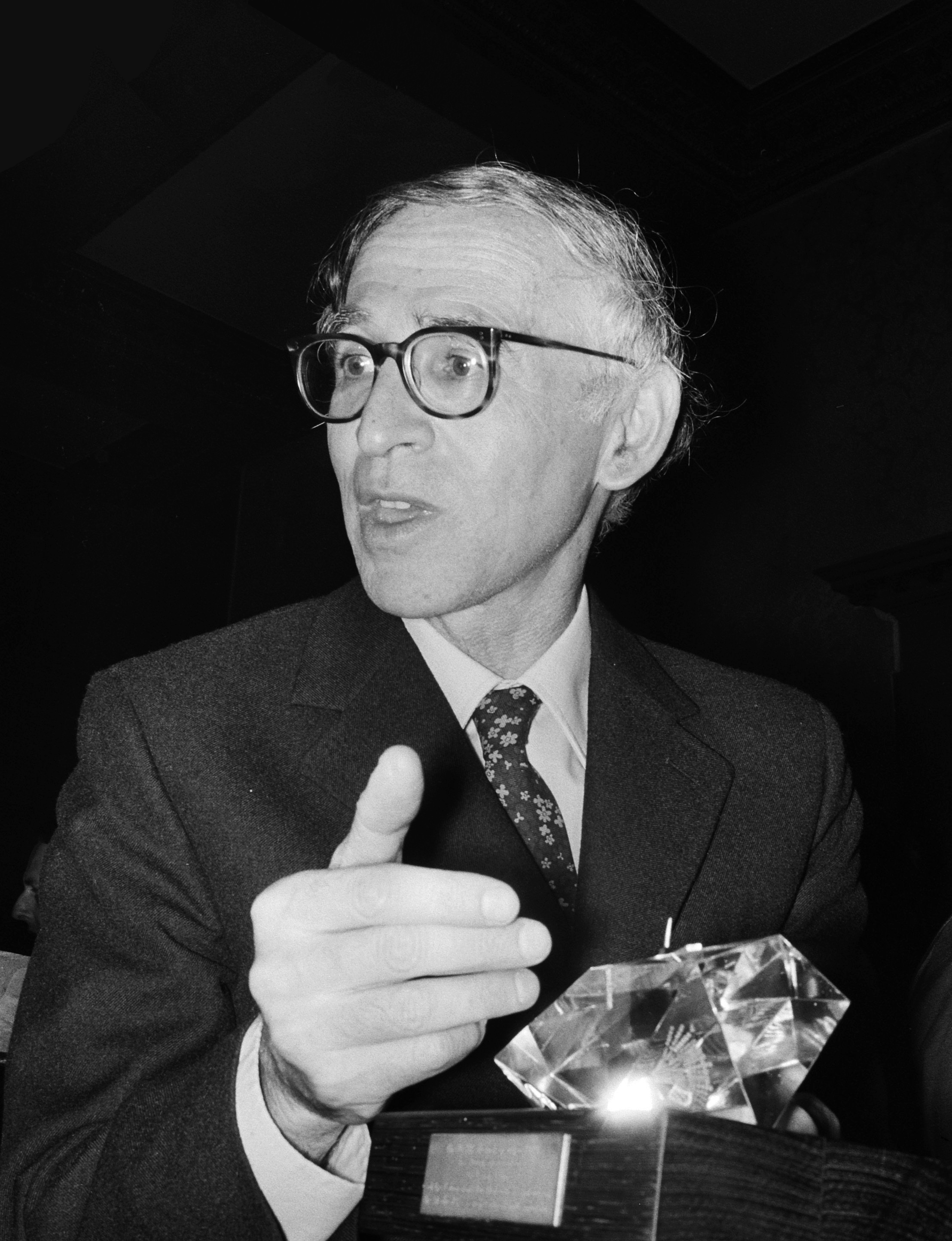
Sir Aaron Klug in 1979

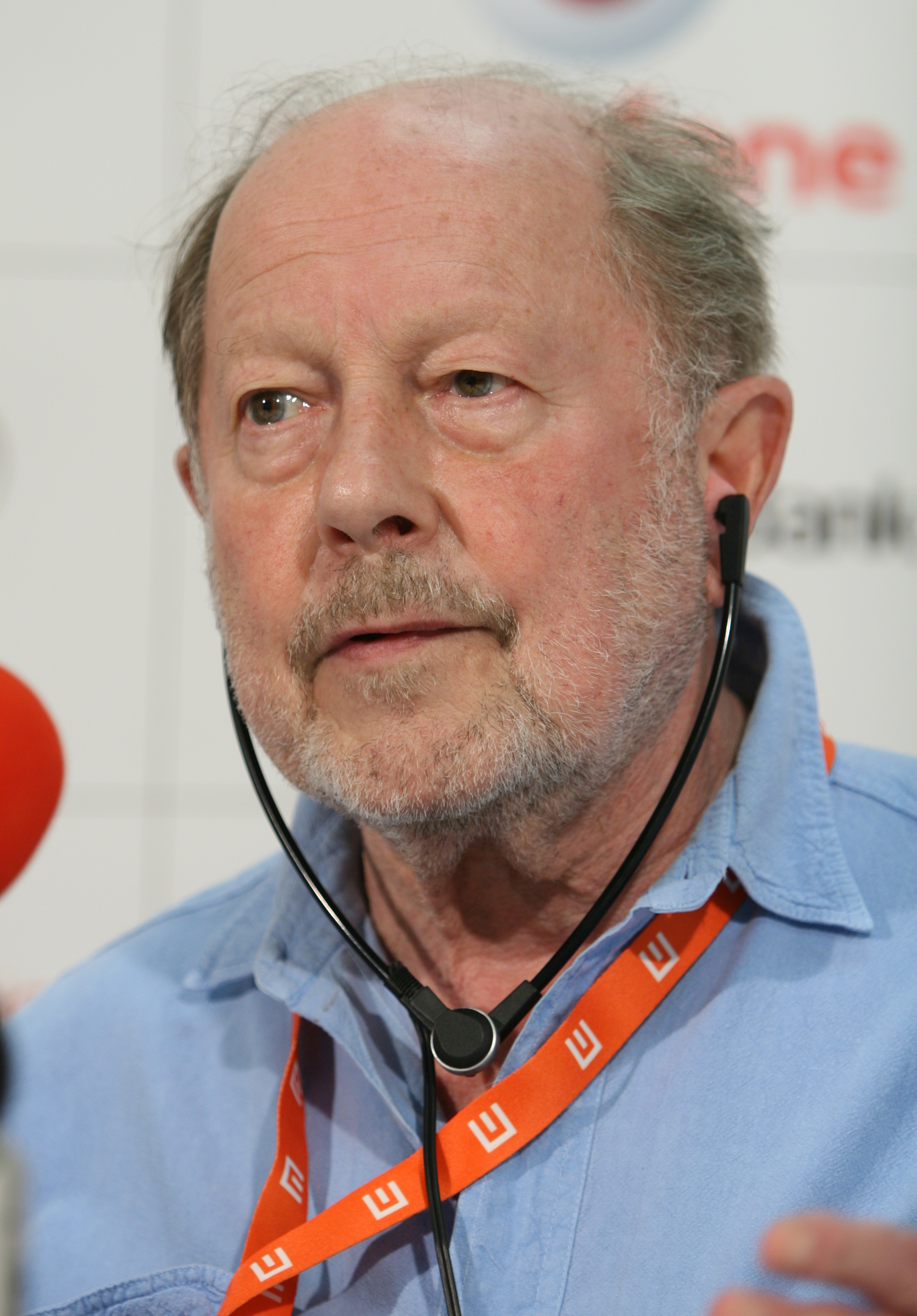
Nicolas Roeg in 2008

- 2 November – John Russell, 27th Baron de Clifford, 90, aristocrat.
- 3 November – John Large, 75, English consulting nuclear engineer.
- 4 November – Sir Jeremy Heywood, 56, civil servant, Cabinet Secretary (2012–2018), cancer.
- 6 November
  - Hugh McDowell, 65, English cellist (Electric Light Orchestra, Wizzard), cancer.
  - Ian Ward, 90, physicist.
- 7 November – Christopher Lehmann-Haupt, 84, Scottish-born American writer, editor and critic.
- 8 November – Dave Morgan, 74, English racing driver, stroke.
- 9 November
  - Roger Hoy, 71, English footballer (Tottenham Hotspur, Crystal Palace, Luton Town, Cardiff City).
  - Janet Paisley, 70, Scottish writer and poet.
  - James Stirling, 65, physicist, provost of Imperial College London (2013–2018).
- 12 November – D.J. Finney, 101, statistician.
- 13 November
  - Ronald P. Dore, 93, sociologist.
  - David Stewart, 71, Scottish footballer (Ayr United, Leeds United, national team).
  - John Wilson, 75, angler, stroke.
- 14 November – Tim Stockdale, 54, English equestrian, stomach cancer.
- 15 November – John Bluthal, 89, Polish-born British-Australian actor (Never Mind the Quality, Feel the Width, The Vicar of Dibley, Hail, Caesar!).
- 16 November – Alec Finn, 74, English-born Irish bouzouki player (De Dannan).
- 17 November
  - Richard Baker, 93, English broadcaster (BBC News).
  - Barrie Betts, 86, English footballer (Manchester City, Scunthorpe United, Stockport County).
  - Jim Iley, 82, English footballer (Sheffield, Nottingham Forest) and manager (Barnsley).
- 18 November
  - Iain Moireach, 80, Scottish Gaelic writer.
  - Jennie Stoller, 72, actress (The Good Father, Sapphire & Steel, King Ralph), cancer.
- 19 November
  - John Mantle, 76, Welsh dual-code international rugby player (Great Britain national rugby league team, Newport, St. Helens).
  - Bunny Sterling, 70, Jamaican-born British boxer.
- 20 November
  - Levine Andrade, 64, Indian-born British violinist.
  - Roy Bailey, 83, English folk singer.
  - Robert Blythe, 71, Welsh actor (High Hopes).
  - Sir Aaron Klug, 92, Lithuanian-born British chemist and biophysicist, Nobel Prize winner (1982).
  - Gordon Morritt, 76, English footballer (Rotherham United, Doncaster Rovers, York City).
- 22 November – Len Campbell, 71, Scottish footballer (Dumbarton).
- 23 November
  - Kevin Austin, 45, English-born Trinidadian footballer (Leyton Orient, Lincoln City, Swansea City), pancreatic cancer.
  - Nicolas Roeg, 90, English film director (Don't Look Now, The Man Who Fell to Earth) and cinematographer (A Funny Thing Happened on the Way to the Forum).
- 25 November
  - Darren Pitcher, 49, English footballer (Charlton Athletic, Crystal Palace).
  - Graham Williams, 81, Welsh footballer (Everton, Swansea Town, Tranmere Rovers).
- 26 November
  - Johnny Hart, 90, English footballer and manager (Manchester City), dementia.
  - Jean Barker, Baroness Trumpington, 96, life peer and socialite.
- 28 November
  - Mark Farrell, 65, English tennis player.
  - Gary Haisman, 60, English musician.
  - Harry Leslie Smith, 95, author and social activist.
- 30 November – Cyril Woolford, English rugby league footballer (Yorkshire, Castleford, Doncaster, Featherstone Rovers).

=== December ===
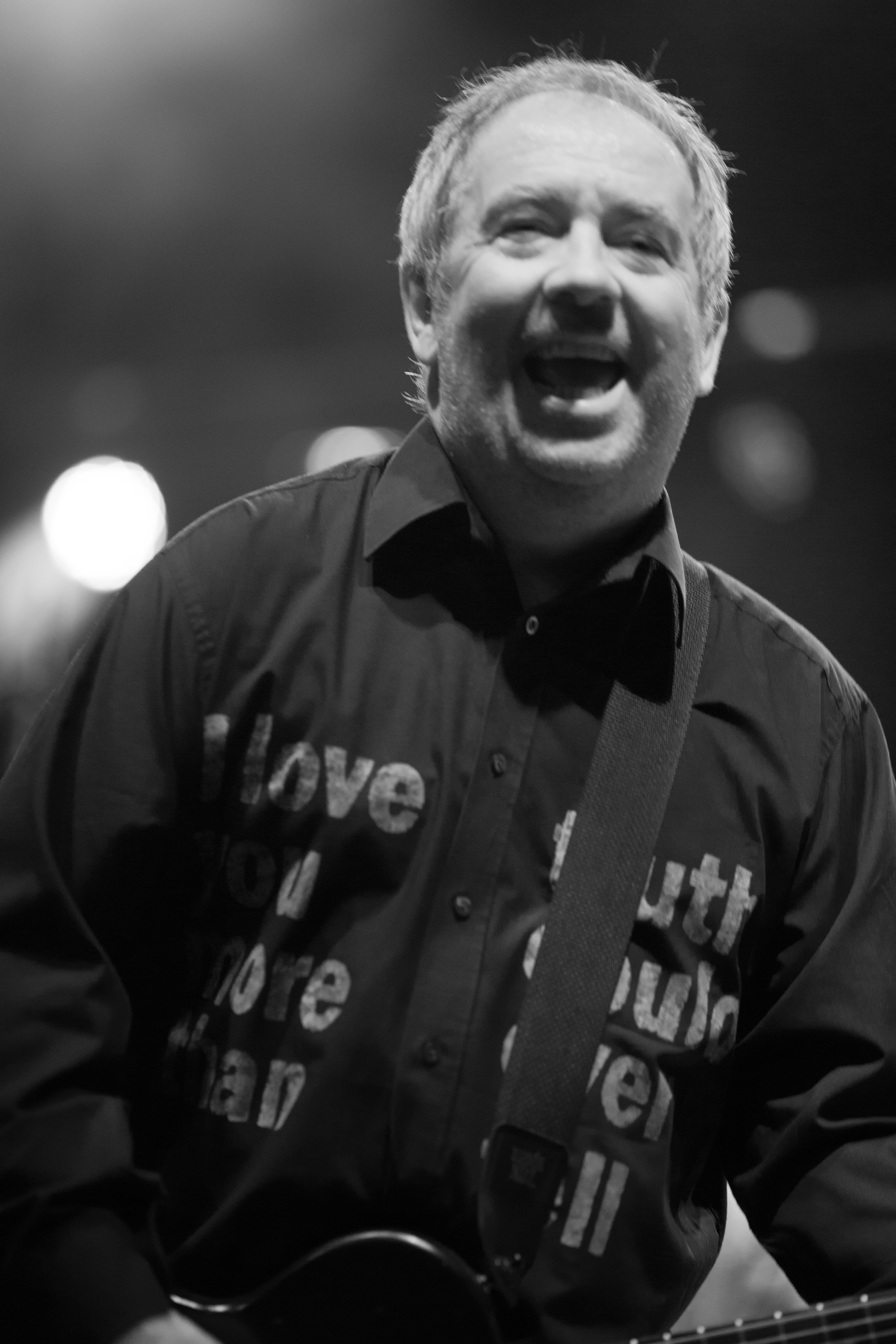
Pete Shelley in 2013

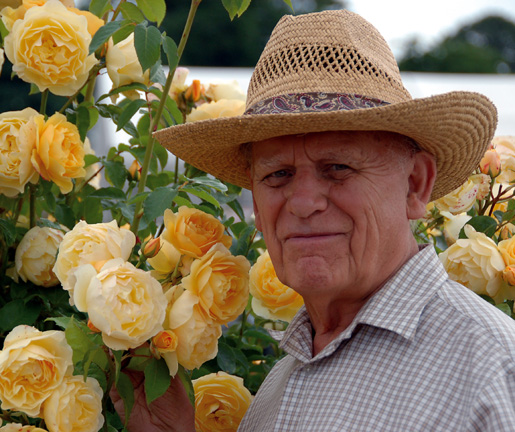
David Austin

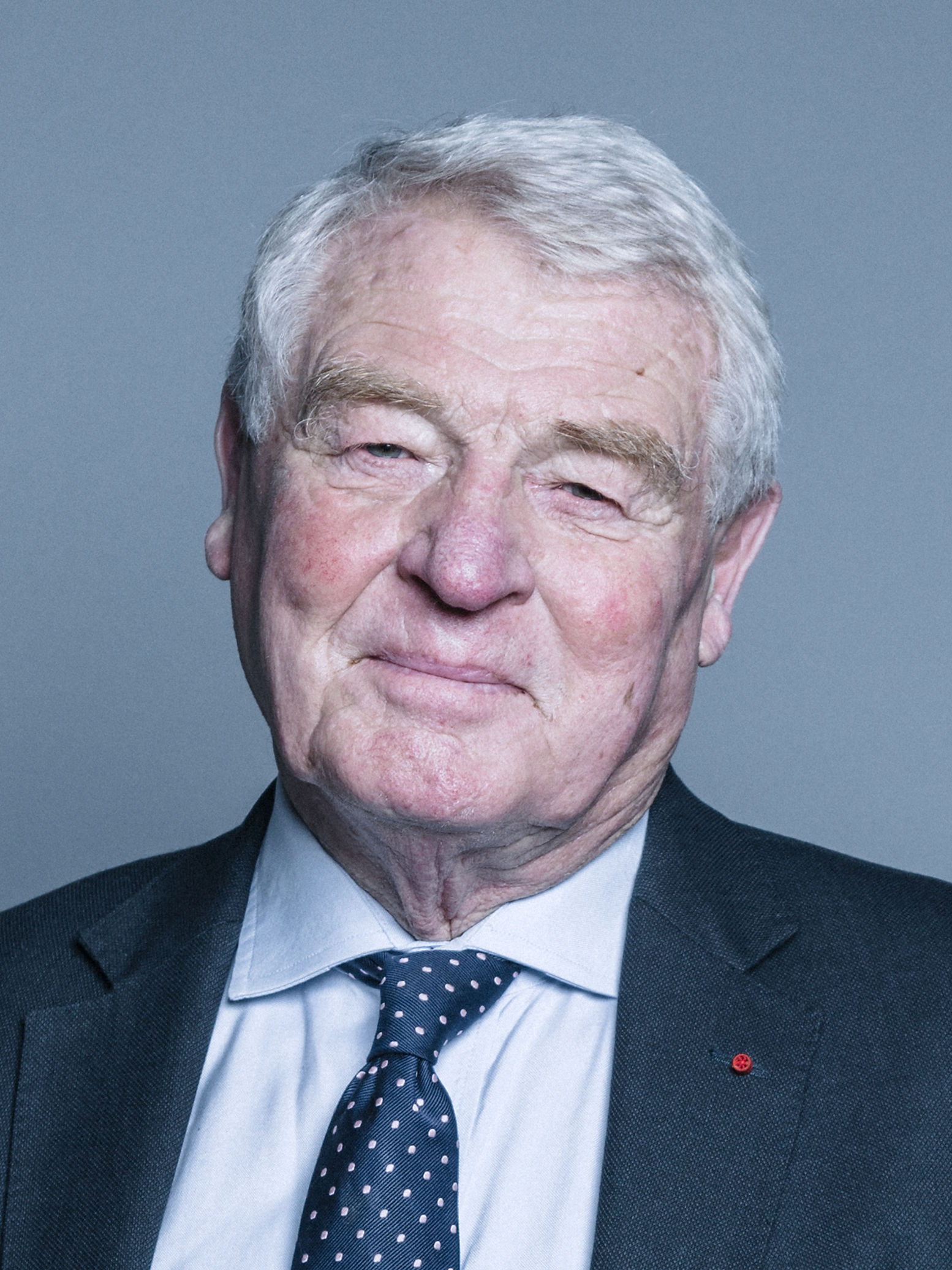
Paddy Ashdown in 2018

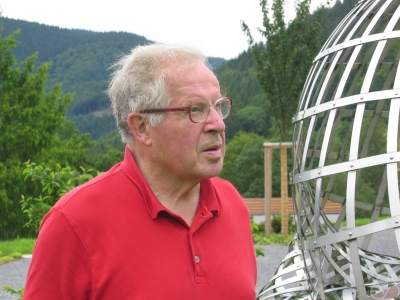
Sir Peter Swinnerton-Dyer in 2007

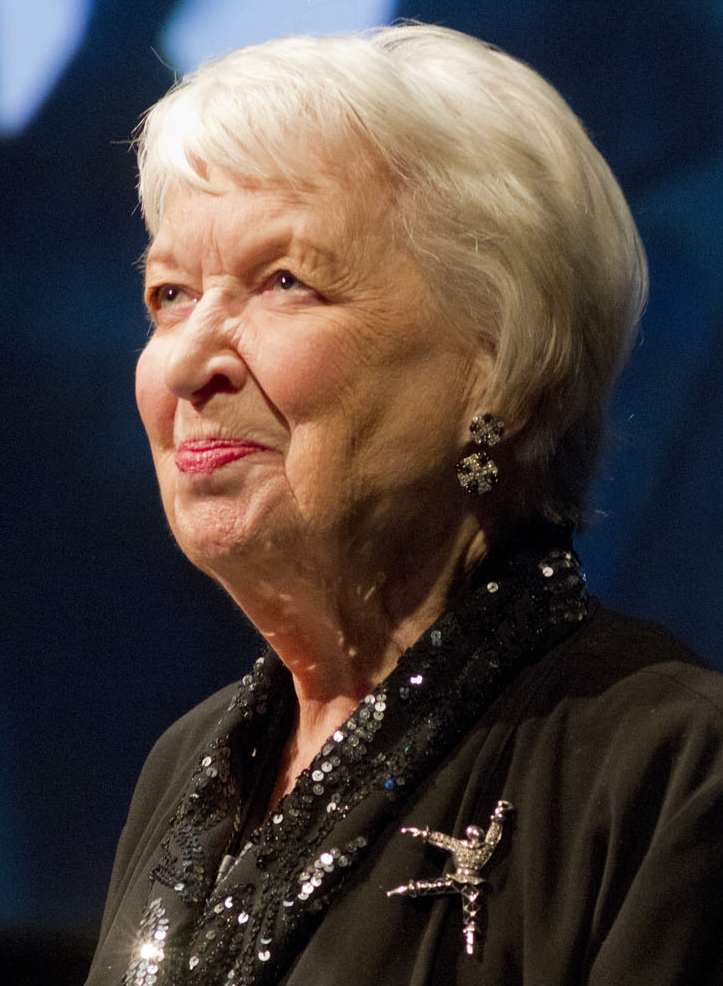
Dame June Whitfield in 2013

- 2 December
  - Paul 'Trouble' Anderson, 59, disc jockey.
  - Paul Sherwen, 62, English racing cyclist (1987 National Champion) and sportscaster, heart failure.
- 3 December
  - Justin Cartwright, 73, South African-born British novelist.
  - Toby Jessel, 84, politician, MP (1970–1997).
  - Roger Mercer, 74, archaeologist.
- 4 December – Peter Armitage, 78, actor (Coronation Street, Jack the Ripper, Hearts and Minds), heart attack.
- 5 December
  - Peter Boizot, 89, English restaurateur (PizzaExpress) and football club owner (Peterborough United).
  - Dynamite Kid, 60, English professional wrestler (WWE, NJPW, Stampede).
- 6 December
  - Thomas Baptiste, 89, Guyanese-born British actor (Coronation Street, Sunday Bloody Sunday).
  - Pete Shelley, 63, English musician (Buzzcocks), heart attack.
- 8 December – Sir David Weatherall, 85, English physician and molecular geneticist.
- 9 December
  - Wendy Ramshaw, 79, artist and designer.
  - Michael Seymour, 86, production designer (Alien), BAFTA winner (1980).
- 10 December – Sacha Hamilton, Duchess of Abercorn, 72, aristocrat.
- 12 December – Bernard Lloyd, 84, Welsh actor (The Signalman).
- 13 December – Christopher Hooley, 90, mathematician.
- 15 December
  - Ralph Koltai, 94, German-born British stage designer.
  - David Myles, 93, Scottish politician, MP for Banffshire (1979–1983).
- 18 December
  - David C. H. Austin, 92, botanist and rose breeder.
  - Gerald Larner, 82, English music critic (The Guardian, The Times).
  - Robert Neild, 94, economist.
  - Lewis Ryder, 77, theoretical physicist.
  - Bill Slater, 91, English footballer
- 19 December – Bill Sellars, 93, British television producer (Doctor Who, All Creatures Great and Small, Triangle).
- 20 December – Donald Moffat, 87, English-American actor
- 21 December – Tom Leonard, 74, Scottish poet.
- 22 December
  - Paddy Ashdown, 77, British politician, Leader of the Liberal Democrats (1988–1999).
  - Roger Owen, 83, British historian (Middle East).
- 23 December – Honey Lantree, 75, British pop drummer (The Honeycombs).
- 25 December
  - William Harbison, 96, British RAF fighter pilot in World War II.
  - Terence Wheeler, 82, British writer.
- 26 December
  - Wendy Beckett, 88, British nun and art historian.
  - Haldane Duncan, 78, Scottish television producer and director (Take the High Road, Taggart, Emmerdale).
  - Sir Hew Hamilton-Dalrymple, 92, Scottish aristocrat and soldier.
  - Mike Metcalf, 79, English footballer (Wrexham, Chester City).
  - Sir Peter Swinnerton-Dyer, 91, British mathematician.
- 27 December – Brian Jordan, 86, English footballer (Rotherham United, York City). (death announced on this date)
- 28 December
  - Peter Hill-Wood, 82, British businessman and football executive (Arsenal).
  - Dame June Whitfield, 93, English actress (Terry and June, Last of the Summer Wine, Absolutely Fabulous).
- 29 December
  - David Cavanagh, British music journalist.
  - Simon Ricketts, 50, British journalist (The Guardian), cancer.
  - Roy Skeggs, 84, British film producer.
- 31 December
  - Dean Ford, 72, Scottish singer and songwriter (Marmalade).
  - Peter Thompson, 76, English footballer (Liverpool, Bolton Wanderers, national team).

== See also ==
- 2018 in British music
- 2018 in British radio
- 2018 in British television
- List of British films of 2018
