= 1912 Ilkeston by-election =

United Kingdom Parliamentary Election

The 1912 Ilkeston by-election was a Parliamentary by-election held on 1 July 1912. The constituency returned one Member of Parliament (MP) to the House of Commons of the United Kingdom, elected by the first past the post voting system.

== Vacancy ==
Jack Seely

Jack Seely had been Liberal MP for the seat of Ilkeston since the 1910 Ilkeston by-election. In 1912, he was promoted to the Cabinet and appointed Secretary of State for War and required to seek re-election.

== Electoral history ==
General election December 1910: Ilkeston Electorate 19,467
| Party | Candidate | Votes | % | ±% |
|---|---|---|---|---|
| Liberal | J. E. B. Seely | 9,990 | 62.7 | +2.9 |
| Conservative | William Marshall Freeman | 5,946 | 37.3 | −2.9 |
| Majority | | 4,044 | 25.4 | +5.8 |
| Turnout | | 15,936 | 81.9 | −5.8 |
| Liberal hold | | Swing | +2.9 | |

== Candidates ==
- Seely was elected Member of Parliament for the Isle of Wight in 1900, as a Unionist. He crossed the floor to join the Liberal Party in 1904. He was returned as a Liberal for Liverpool Abercromby in 1906 but was defeated in January 1910. He was quickly found a new seat at Ilkeston shortly after. He served as Under-Secretary of State for the Colonies under H. H. Asquith between 1908 and 1911, as Under-Secretary of State for War from 1911 to 1912, and became a member of the Privy Council in 1909.
- William Marshall Freeman, who had contested the election here as Conservative candidate in December 1910 was re-adopted as Conservative candidate.
- The Independent Labour Party considered running John Thomas White as candidate but the national Labour Party leadership did not wish to see Seely opposed.

== Campaign ==
Polling Day was set for 1 July 1912.

== Result ==
Despite the mid-term unpopularity of the Liberal Government, Seely was re-elected, albeit with a much reduced majority.

1912 Ilkeston by-election Electorate 20,670
| Party | Candidate | Votes | % | ±% |
|---|---|---|---|---|
| Liberal | J. E. B. Seely | 9,049 | 53.6 | −9.1 |
| Unionist | William Marshall Freeman | 7,838 | 46.4 | +9.1 |
| Majority | | 1,211 | 7.2 | −18.2 |
| Turnout | | 16,887 | 81.7 | −0.2 |
| Liberal hold | | Swing | -9.1 | |

== Aftermath ==
A General Election was due to take place by the end of 1915. By the autumn of 1914, the following candidates had been adopted to contest that election.

- Liberal: Jack Seely
- Unionist: William Marshall Freeman
- The Labour Party chose not to run a candidate when the National Union of Railwaymen chose to endorse Seely.

Due to the outbreak of war, the election never took place. When an election did finally take place after the war, Seely was again re-elected.

General election 1918: Ilkeston Electorate 28,896
| Party | Candidate | Votes | % | ±% |
|---|---|---|---|---|
| Liberal | J. E. B. Seely | 9,660 | 54.8 | +1.2 |
| Labour | George Oliver | 7,962 | 45.2 | New |
| Majority | | 1,698 | 9.6 | +2.4 |
| Turnout | | 17,622 | 61.0 | −19.3 |
| Liberal hold | | Swing | | |

Seely was endorsed by the Coalition Government. The local Unionists felt obliged to support Seely, however at the following general election in 1922 Freeman was once more their candidate but he finished third.
