= 1904 Isle of Wight by-election =

UK Parliamentary by-election

The Isle of Wight by-election was a Parliamentary by-election held on 6 April 1904. The constituency returned one Member of Parliament (MP) to the House of Commons of the United Kingdom, elected by the first past the post voting system.

The seat had become vacant when the incumbent Independent Conservative Member of Parliament, J. E. B. Seely resigned from the House of Commons in order to stand for re-election. Seely vacated his Parliamentary seat by being appointed Steward of the Chiltern Hundreds on 22 March 1904.

== Background ==
Seely had voted in favour of a Liberal amendment to the King's Speech in February 1904 moved by John Morley in favour of free trade. He went on to second a Liberal amendment opposing the introduction of Chinese indentured labour in the Transvaal Colony.

In March 1904, the Isle of Wight Conservative Association requested Conservative Central Office to find them a new candidate, effectively deselecting Seely.

Later that March, Seely resigned the Conservative whip and sat as an Independent Conservative.

On 21 March 1904, Seely spoke in the House of Commons on Chinese labour, indicating that he would resign his seat and stand for re-election.

The writ for the by-election was moved on 25 March 1904.

== Candidates ==
The Liberal Chief Whip, Herbert Gladstone, persuaded Godfrey Baring not to stand as the Liberal candidate. Baring had contested the seat at the 1900 by-election and was chairman of the Isle of Wight County Council.

Seely stood as an Unionist Free Trader.

The Conservatives decided not to run a candidate at the by-election. They claimed to be reserving themselves for the future general election. Their failure to contest the seat was viewed as a sign that they had lost the support of the electorate.

== Result ==
1904 Isle of Wight by-election
Party	Candidate	Votes	%	±%
Ind. Conservative	John Seely	Unopposed		
Registered electors		14,840		
Ind. Conservative gain from Conservative				

== Aftermath ==
Having been re-elected, Seely joined the Liberal Party in May 1904.
