= David Seely, 4th Baron Mottistone =

British peer

Captain David Peter Seely, 4th Baron Mottistone, CBE, KStJ (16 December 1920 – 24 November 2011) was a naval officer and British peer.

Seely was born in 1920. He was the eldest son of the 1st Baron Mottistone from his second marriage to Evelyn Izme Murray daughter of Montolieu Oliphant-Murray, 1st Viscount Elibank and 10th Lord Elibank, and half-brother to Henry John Alexander Seely, 2nd Baron Mottistone and Arthur Patrick William Seely, 3rd Baron Mottistone. He was a grandson of Sir Charles Seely, 1st Baronet. He was baptised with Winston Churchill and the then Duke of Cornwall (subsequently Edward VIII, and then later Duke of Windsor) as his godparents.

He served in the Royal Navy, ultimately reaching the rank of captain. He commanded Cossack between 1958 and 1959 and Ajax between 1963 and 1965. In 1966 he succeeded to the barony and retired from the service.

He was Lord Lieutenant of the Isle of Wight from 1986 to 1995 and the last Governor of the Isle of Wight from 1992 to 1995, where the Seely family have played a prominent role since the 1850s. He was created a Commander of the Order of the British Empire in 1984 and made an Honorary Doctor of Literature by Bournemouth University in 1993. He was also an ex officio member of The Royal Yacht Squadron. He died on 24 November 2011. He was succeeded by his eldest son Peter John Philip Seely, born 29 October 1949, who was a godson of Prince Philip, Duke of Edinburgh.

== Arms ==
Coat of arms of David Seely, 4th Baron Mottistone

Crest
In front of three ears of wheat banded Or the trunk of a tree fesswise eradicated and sprouting to the dexter Proper.
Escutcheon
Azure three ears of wheat banded Or between two martlets in pale and as many chaplets of roses in fess Argent.
Supporters
On either side a sea horse (hippocampus) Azure gorged with a mural crown and charged on the shoulder with a maple leaf Or.
Motto
In Deo Spero

== See also ==
- Seely baronets
- Baron Mottistone

Honorary titles
Preceded by Sir John Nicholson	Lord Lieutenant of the Isle of Wight; 1986–1995	Succeeded by Sir Christopher Bland
Peerage of the United Kingdom
Preceded by Arthur Patrick William Seely	Baron Mottistone; 1966–2011	Succeeded by Peter John Philip Seely
