= 1910 Ilkeston by-election =

UK parliamentary by-election

The 1910 Ilkeston by-election was a Parliamentary by-election in the constituency of Ilkeston in Derbyshire. It returned one Member of Parliament (MP) to the House of Commons of the United Kingdom, elected by the first past the post voting system. The by-election was held on 7 March 1910.

== Vacancy ==
The by-election was held due to the incumbent Liberal MP, Walter Foster, becoming Baron Ilkeston and taking a seat in the House of Lords. Foster had been Liberal MP for the seat of Ilkeston since the 1887 Ilkeston by-election.

== Electoral history ==
The seat had been Liberal since it was created in 1885. They easily held the seat at the last election, with a reduced majority;

Sir Walter Foster

General election January 1910: Ilkeston
Party	Candidate	Votes	%	±%
Liberal	Walter Foster	10,632	62.3	−2.0
Conservative	Forbes St John Morrow	6,432	37.7	+2.0
Majority		4,200	24.6	−4.0
Turnout		17,064	87.7	+0.5
Liberal hold		Swing	-2.0	

== Candidates ==
- The local Liberal Association selected 42-year-old Rt Hon. Jack Seely to defend the seat.

== Campaign ==
Polling Day was fixed for the 7 March 1910.

== Result ==
The Liberals held the seat and managed a slightly reduced majority;

Seely

1910 Ilkeston by-election
Party	Candidate	Votes	%	±%
Liberal	J. E. B. Seely	10,204	59.7	−2.6
Conservative	Henry FitzHerbert Wright	6,871	40.3	+2.6
Majority		3,333	19.4	−5.2
Turnout		17,075	87.7	0.0
Liberal hold		Swing	-2.5	

== Aftermath ==
General election December 1910: Ilkeston
Party	Candidate	Votes	%	±%
Liberal	J. E. B. Seely	9,990	62.7	+0.4
Conservative	William Marshall Freeman	5,946	37.3	−0.4
Majority		4,044	25.4	+0.8
Turnout		15,936	81.9	−5.8
Liberal hold		Swing	+2.9	
