= Patrick Seely =

British Liberal Party politician

The Right Honourable The Lord Mattistone TD DL
- Born: Arthur Patrick William Seely; 18 August 1905; Isle of Wight, United Kingdom
- Died: 4 December 1966 (aged 61)
- Occupation: Land agent

Arthur Patrick William Seely, 3rd Baron Mottistone TD DL (18 August 1905 – 4 December 1966), was a family Land Agent on the Isle of Wight and a British Liberal Party politician.

== Background ==
He was the third son of Rt Hon. Jack Seely, who served as a Liberal Cabinet Minister and Emily Florence Crichton. He was educated at Harrow School and Trinity College, Cambridge. He married, in 1939, Wilhelmina Josephine Philippa Van Haeften, eldest daughter of the Dutch Baron Van Haeften. They divorced in 1949. In 1963 he succeeded his elder brother John Seely as Baron Mottistone. In 1966 upon his death he was succeeded by his half-brother David Seely.

== Military career ==
He was commissioned as a Second Lieutenant in the 95th (Hampshire Yeomanry) Field Brigade, Royal Artillery, of the Territorial Army (TA) on 26 June 1931, then Lieutenant in the 57th (Wessex) Heavy Anti-Aircraft Regiment, Royal Artillery on 27 June 1934. He was re-commissioned as a Lieutenant on 1 May 1939, just before the outbreak of World War II. In 1940 he was promoted to Captain. In 1942 he was promoted to Major. After the war, he was promoted to Lieutenant-Colonel in the TA and given command of the former 57th (Wessex) when it was reformed as the 457th Heavy Anti-Aircraft Regiment.

== Political career ==
In 1934 he followed his father into politics on the Isle of Wight when he was elected as a County Councillor for the Freshwater Division. He served on the Isle of Wight County Council until resigning in May 1938. Around 1937 he was selected by the Isle of Wight Liberals to be their prospective parliamentary candidate, but by 1939 had been replaced by Helen de Guerry Browne. After the war he was Liberal candidate for the Nottingham East Division at the 1945 General Election. This was a former Liberal seat that was lost in 1931 and where the Liberals had come third in 1935. Although he finished third he was able to increase the Liberal vote share;

General Election 1945: Nottingham East Electorate 41,734
Party	Candidate	Votes	%	±%
Labour	James Harrison	12,075	40.2	+14.5
Conservative	Louis Halle Gluckstein	11,227	37.4	−20.3
Liberal	Maj. Hon. Arthur Patrick William Seely	5,658	18.8	+2.2
Independent Labour	George Twells	1,072	3.6	n/a
Majority		848	2.8	−29.3
Turnout			72.0	+3.9
Labour gain from Conservative		Swing	+17.4	

Coat of arms of Patrick Seely

Crest
In front of three ears of wheat banded Or the trunk of a tree fesswise eradicated and sprouting to the dexter Proper.
Escutcheon
Azure three ears of wheat banded Or between two martlets in pale and as many chaplets of roses in fess Argent.
Supporters
On either side a sea horse (hippocampus) Azure gorged with a mural crown and charged on the shoulder with a maple leaf Or.
Motto
In Deo Spero

Peerage of the United Kingdom
Preceded by John Seely	Baron Mottistone; 1963–1966	Succeeded by David Seely
