= 1st Wessex Artillery =

2nd Hampshire Artillery Volunteers 1st (Wessex) Brigade, Royal Field Artillery 54th (Wessex) Field Brigade, RA 57th (Wessex) Anti-Aircraft Regiment, RA
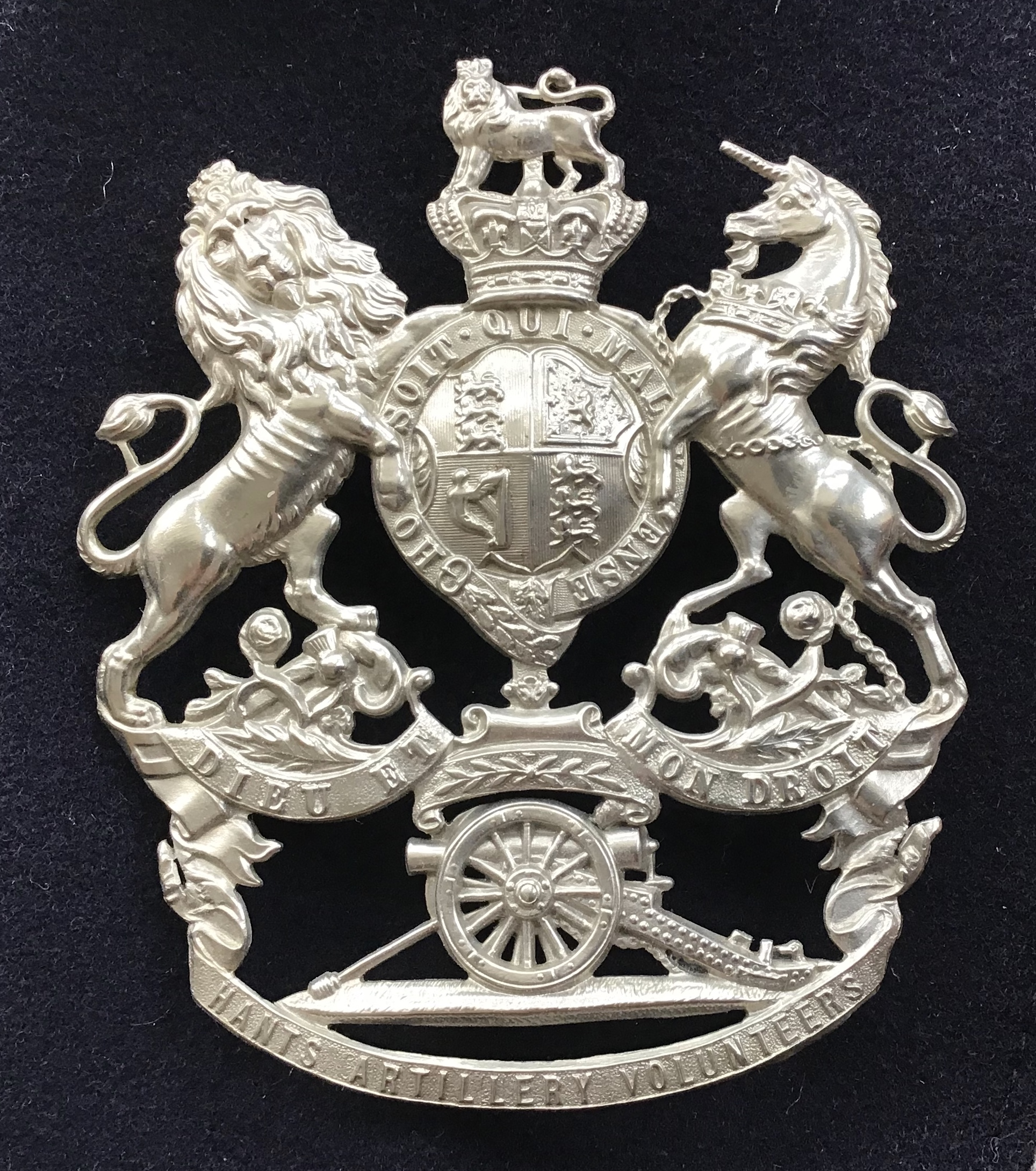
- Helmet plate, Hampshire Artillery Volunteers, c1890
- Active: 9 May 1860–1 April 1971
- Country: United Kingdom
- Branch: Territorial Army
- Type: Artillery Regiment
- Role: Garrison Artillery (1860–1908); Field Artillery (1908–1932); Heavy Anti-Aircraft Artillery (1932–1967); Infantry (1967–1971)
- Garrison/HQ: Southsea, Portsmouth
- Engagements: World War I: Mesopotamian campaign; World War II: Southampton Blitz; North African Campaign; Italian Campaign

Commanders
- Notable commanders: Col Sir William Dupree, 1st Baronet

The 1st Wessex Artillery was a volunteer unit of the British Army that existed under various titles from 1860 to 1971, including active service in Mesopotamia in World War I and North Africa and Italy in World War II.

== Volunteer Artillery 1859-1908 ==
An invasion scare in 1859 led to a surge of new Rifle and Artillery Volunteer corps composed of part-time soldiers eager to supplement the Regular British Army in time of need. The 2nd Hampshire (2nd Hants) Artillery Volunteers (AV) was formed in the Volunteer Force at Southsea on 9 May 1860 (Note: It was originally the 3rd Hants AVC, but was redesignated 2nd in June 1860 after the originally proposed 2nd AVC was cancelled.) and quickly formed further batteries:

- 2nd Battery on 20 July 1860
- 3rd Battery on 24 May 1861
- 4th Battery by January 1864
- 5th Battery on 15 September 1865
- 6th Battery on 15 September 1865

The unit became part of the 1st Administrative Brigade, Hampshire Artillery Volunteers when that was formed on 11 December 1860, along with the 1st Hants AV at Bitterne, Southampton, and the 3rd Hants (Dockyard) AV raised from civilian staff of Portsmouth Dockyard. In 1871, the 2nd Hants absorbed the Dockyard AV and moved its headquarters (HQ) to Portsmouth. The 2nd Hants AV drilled on the guns at Southsea Castle.

On 13 April 1880, the Administrative Brigade was consolidated as the 1st Hampshire (Hants and Dorset) Artillery Volunteer Corps, with the 2nd Hants AV providing Batteries Nos 5 to 12 at Portsmouth. In 1882, all the artillery volunteers were assigned to one of the territorial garrison divisions of the Royal Artillery (RA), and the unit joined the Southern Division. It was redesignated the 1st Volunteer (Hampshire) Brigade, Southern Division, RA in September 1886, when the Dorset batteries formed their own corps and the brigade's HQ moved back to Southsea. However, the new brigade was broken up in 1889, the Southampton batteries forming a new 3rd Volunteer Brigade while the Portsmouth batteries remained in the 1st. The following year, they were redesignated 1st and 2nd, but because the original 1st Hants AVC was in the 3rd Brigade, that had seniority and so the 1st Bde with the Portsmouth and Southsea batteries became the '2nd Hants' once more.

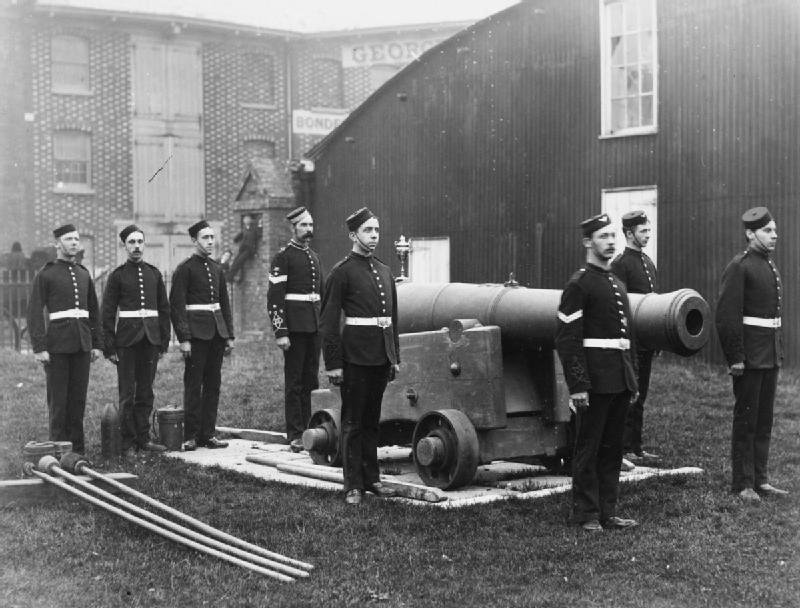
2nd Hampshire Artillery Volunteers at Drill, Penny Street, Southsea, c1895 (IWM Q41452)

The newly independent 2nd Hants had 10 batteries (termed companies from November 1891), and in 1894 these were distributed as follows:

- HQ at Southsea
- Nos 1–5 and 8–10 Companies at Portsmouth
- No 6 Company at Gosport
- No 7 Company at Freshwater, Isle of Wight
- No 9 Company at Cosham

By 1893, the War Office Mobilisation Scheme had allocated the 2nd Hampshire Artillery Volunteers to the Portsmouth fixed defences. An 11th company was raised by 1908

On 1 June 1899, the RA was split into Royal Field Artillery and Royal Garrison Artillery (RGA), and the Volunteers were affiliated to the RGA. On 1 January 1902, the RA abandoned its divisional organisation and the unit changed its designation to 2nd Hampshire Royal Garrison Artillery (Volunteers).

By 1900, the 2nd Hants had a total enrolment of 777 out of an authorised strength of 805 officers and men. In 1904, the unit won the King's Prize for Garrison Artillery at the annual National Artillery Association competition held at Shoeburyness.

== Territorial Force ==
When the Volunteers were subsumed into the new Territorial Force (TF) under the Haldane Reforms of 1908, Nos 1–8 companies of the 2nd Hants RGA formed 1st (Wessex) Brigade Royal Field Artillery (RFA), organised as follows:

- 1st Hampshire Battery at Portsmouth
- 2nd Hampshire Battery at Portsmouth
- 3rd Hampshire Battery at Gosport
- 1st Wessex Ammunition Column, newly raised at Southsea

Nos 10 and 11 Companies were separated to form the nucleus of the 2nd Wessex (Howitzer) Brigade, RFA, on the Isle of Wight. (Note: The brigade and ammunition column were originally numbered 4th, but this was changed to 2nd by 1910.)

No 9 Company at Cosham also provided the nucleus of the Wessex (Hampshire) Heavy Battery, Royal Garrison Artillery.

As the change of title indicates, 1st Wessex Brigade was now trained and equipped as field artillery rather than garrison artillery. It formed part of the Wessex Division of the TF. When war was declared in August 1914, the whole division was at its annual camp on Salisbury Plain.

== World War I ==
=== Mobilisation ===
On mobilisation in 1914, the Territorials of the Wessex Division were sent to India to relieve British and Indian Regular troops for the Western Front. The artillery left behind their horses and their ammunition column, which were needed in France.

With the expansion of the army, the division was designated 43rd (Wessex) Infantry Division in April 1915 and 1st Wessex Brigade became CCXV (or 215) Brigade RFA. Its three batteries were renamed A, B and C.

All those Territorials who had not volunteered for overseas service, together with the recruits, were left behind to form Second Line units. The 45th (2nd Wessex) Division containing the CCXXV (2/1st Wessex) Bde RFA resulted from this process, and was ready so quickly that it followed the 43rd to India in December 1914. These units remained in garrison in India, supplying drafts to the First Line and other theatres throughout the war until they had virtually disappeared. CCXXV Bde was broken up in April 1917.

Initially, CCXV brigade had been equipped with obsolete 15-pounder field guns, but in July 1916 it re-equipped with 4 x 18-pounders per battery in preparation for front line duty.

=== Mesopotamia ===
With a reformed Brigade Ammunition Column, CCXV Bde moved in October 1916 to Basra to take part in the Mesopotamian campaign, and on 8 December 1916 it joined 3rd (Lahore) Division of the Indian Army on the Tigris front. At this time, it had 524 (Howitzer) Battery (4 x 4.5-inch howitzers) attached, which remained with the brigade until September 1917.

From 14 December 1916 until 19 January 1917, the division participated in the advance to the Hai and the capture of the Khudaira Bend. The one-hour bombardment at Khudaira by 3rd Division's guns on 9 January was described by the Turks as 'violent' and caused heavy losses. When the infantry went in, they occupied the Turkish front line in minutes with few losses. The Turks counter-attacked under cover of a mist, but when that cleared a 15-minute bombardment enabled the British to secure the position.

After the capture of Baghdad, 524th (Howitzer) Battery was lent to 7th (Meerut) Division for the advance on Hassaiwa and Fallujah, which was captured on 19 March 1917. In parallel, the rest of CCXV Bde was with another force advancing towards Khaniqin, where they were supposed to link up with Russian troops. There was no sign of the Russians, but the Turks were present in force in the Jabal Hamrin hills. A brigade group including B Battery CCXV was ordered to outflank this position, and at one point B/CCXV was engaging the enemy at 1500 yards' range from open positions in the plain. But the Turkish position was too strong and the British force had to fall back towards Baghdad.

In July, the British resumed their advance, making for Ramadi. CCXV had its own A and B Batteries, 66th Battery and 524 (Howitzer) Battery under command. Contact was made at Mushaid Ridge, where the force was held by heavy fire from the banks of the Euphrates Canal and from the Regulator House. 2nd Battalion 7th Gurkha Rifles and CCXV Bde were ordered to try a left flanking movement. The Turks had about six guns firing very accurately, but 66th and 524th Batteries got the upper hand and by 1830 hours the Gurkhas were across the canal, only to come under heavy fire from the Ramadi trenches. Forward artillery observers saw signs of a Turkish retirement and brought down fire on the Aziziya Ridge to cut them off. But now confusion set in: Turkish shells cut telephone wires, two forward observers were wounded, and a dust storm blew up. Then, two guns of B Battery were hit. No effective artillery bombardment was possible and the attack had to be called off. The flanking force had lost 566 casualties, 321 from the effects of heat.

On 7 August 1917, CCXV's 18-pounder batteries were renamed again, as 1086, 1087 and 1088, and 1087 Battery was then broken up (probably to make the other batteries up to 6 guns each). CCXV Bde transferred to 15th Indian Division on 4 October 1917 and gained an extra battery: 2/1st Nottinghamshire Royal Horse Artillery (renumbered 816 Battery RFA in February 1918).

With 15th Indian Division on the Euphrates front, CCXV Bde participated in the occupation of Hīt on 8 March 1918 and the action of Khan Baghdadi on 25 March 1918. At the latter battle, CCXV and CCXXII Brigades advanced by alternate batteries over rough country under heavy enemy fire. 1088 Battery lost a gun and many casualties, but they continued moving forward and kept the momentum of the infantry advance going. By now, the gunners were so far forward that they were engaging at ranges of 1800–2200 yards, putting down a steady barrage on the Turkish trenches followed by 15 minutes of intense fire, described by the RA's historian, Gen Sir Martin Farndale, as 'the most accurate seen so far' on the Mesopotamian Front. The infantry were able to enter these trenches with few casualties, taking many prisoners and enemy guns.

After Khan Baghdadi, CCXV was sent to the rear to ease supply problems, and therefore took no part in the pursuit to Kirkuk through April and May. 15th Indian Division played little part in the final battles in Mesopotamia. CCXV Bde was placed in suspended animation in 1919.

== Interwar years ==
=== 54th (Wessex) Field Brigade ===
The 1st Wessex Brigade re-formed on 7 February 1920 with 1–3 (Hampshire) Batteries, and reabsorbed the Wessex Heavy Battery as 4 (Hampshire) (Howitzer) Battery. In 1921, the TF was reorganised as the Territorial Army (TA) and the brigade now became 54th (Wessex) Brigade, Royal Field Artillery, organised as follows:

- 213 (Hampshire) Battery at Portsmouth
- 214 (Hampshire) Battery at Southsea
- 215 (Hampshire) Battery at Gosport
- 216 (Hampshire) (Howitzer) Battery at Cosham – 216 (Cosham) Battery from 1 October 1932

The RFA was subsumed into the Royal Artillery (RA) on 1 June 1924 and the brigade became 54th (Wessex) Field Brigade.

=== 57th (Wessex) Anti-Aircraft Brigade ===
The unit was given a new role and title on 1 October 1932 as 57th (Wessex) Anti-Aircraft Brigade, taking over 219 (Isle of Wight) Battery from 95th (Hampshire Yeomanry) Field Regiment in exchange for 216 (Cosham) Battery (219 (IoW) Battery had originally been part of 2nd Wessex Bde). In February 1938, 219 (IoW) AA Bty absorbed 216 (Cosham) Fd Bty returned from 95th Fd Bde and was redesignated 219 (Isle of Wight and Cosham) AA Bty. Then, in July 1938, the other three batteries changed their designations, giving the brigade the following organisation on the eve of World War II:

- RHQ at St Pauls Road, Southsea
- 213 (Portsmouth) Light AA Battery at Southsea
- 214 (Southsea) AA Battery at Southsea
- 215 (Gosport and Fareham) AA Battery at Walpole Road, Gosport
- 219 (Isle of Wight and Cosham) AA Battery at Drill Hall, Newport.

As Britain's AA defences were expanded, on 1 April 1938 the regiment became part of the newly formed 35th Anti-Aircraft Brigade at Fareham, which soon became part of a new 5th AA Division raised in September 1938 with responsibility for the south and south-west of England.

On 1 January 1939 the RA's AA brigades were redesignated 'regiments', eliminating confusion with the new AA formations being created.

== World War II ==
=== Mobilisation and Blitz ===
Anti-Aircraft Command mobilised in August 1939, ahead of the declaration of war, and 57th AA Regiment was transferred to a new 65th AA Brigade in 5th AA Division, responsible for the AA defence of Southampton. It remained with this brigade through the Battle of Britain and the Southampton Blitz.

In the summer of 1940, along with other AA units equipped with 3-inch or the newer 3.7-inch AA guns, the 57th was designated a Heavy AA Regiment, and 213 Light AA Battery was converted to HAA.

The regiment sent a cadre to 209th Training Regiment at Blandford Camp to form a new 400 HAA Bty on 12 December 1940. This joined 122nd HAA Rgt in 1941. Later, the regiment also provided the cadre for 430 HAA Bty formed on 8 May 1941 at 207th HAA Training Rgt, Devizes.

=== Mid-war years ===
When the Blitz ended in May 1941, the regiment had returned to Portsmouth and 35th AA Bde. Shortly afterwards, 219 Bty was attached to 27th AA Bde in 5th AA Division, and during the summer it was permanently transferred to 124th HAA Rgt in that brigade. It was replaced in 57th HAA Rgt by 430 Bty from the training regiment. However, by December, the regiment had transferred (with just 213, 214 and 215 Btys) to 49th AA Bde covering London as part of 1st AA Division, while 430 Bty went on 17 December to 42nd AA Bde covering Glasgow and the Firth of Clyde in 12th AA Division.

57th HAA Regiment was now under training for mobile operations overseas, and it temporarily left AA Command in January 1942, returning to 34th AA Bde covering Birmingham and Coventry in 11th AA Division. In May it transferred to 61st AA Bde in 9th AA Division in South Wales, but left again by the end of June, leaving AA Command entirely.

=== North Africa ===
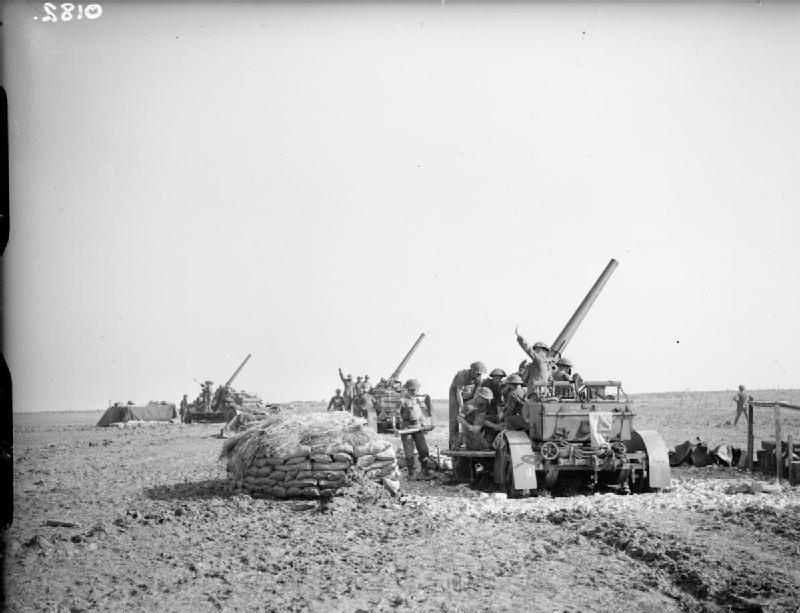
3-inch AA guns on cruciform travelling carriages.

In October 1942, 57 (Wessex) HAA Rgt with 213, 214 and 215 Batteries was sent to North Africa to join 12 AA Bde in Eighth Army. Two of the batteries were equipped with the older 3-inch 20 cwt gun on a modernised trailer, rather than the newer 3.7-inch. This was because the lighter 3-inch was easier and quicker to deploy in the rough country anticipated for this campaign. The regiment remained with 12 AA Bde to the end of the campaign in May 1943.

=== Italy ===
In September 1943, 12 AA Bde including 57 HAA Rgt sailed direct from Tunisia to take part in the landings at Salerno on mainland Italy (Operation Avalanche). When German counter-attacks threatened to break through 56th (London) Division to the beachhead on D+3, one newly arrived battery of 57 HAA Rgt was called upon to join the divisional fire-plan under control of field regiment Observation Post parties. The regiment fired 6000 rounds on enemy positions, road junctions, buildings and troops.

For X Corps' crossing of the River Volturno in October, 12 AA Bde's units were deployed to protect bridges, field gun positions and landing grounds. 'The Luftwaffe was very active in attempting to deny the crossings, particularly in the use of Bf 109 and Fw 190s in fighter-bomber attacks. Seven were shot down, two by 213th/57th HAA Battery, which knocked down an Bf 109 with 13 rounds'.

However, the threat from the Luftwaffe declined as the campaign progressed, and the versatile 3.7-inch HAA guns began to be used in field roles as corps medium artillery. From October to December 1943, 12 AA Bde was static, with all of its regiments and batteries engaged in corps tasks in the forward area.

In January 1944, 12 AA Bde moved up to cover the crossing of the Garigliano. Bde HQ reported that 57 HAA, operating in a dual AA/field role, had a particularly busy time involving 16 AA engagements, in which there were two Category 1 kills for the expenditure of 222 rounds, intermixed with firing 10,880 rounds against counter-bombardment and opportunity targets on the ground. Continuous rapid fire led to overheating and twice the usual amount of barrel wear for the guns. In addition, the gunlaying (GL) and local warning (LW) radar sets of the batteries operating up forward in the ground role provided the only AA early warning coverage across the front.

Once US Fifth Army had crossed the river and the siege of Monte Cassino begun, 12 AA Bde was transferred to British XII Corps for the Rapido river crossings and the advance along Highway 6 up the Liri Valley. Again the HAA batteries were heavily involved in Corps fireplans, particularly for counter-mortar shoots. Some HAA troops of 4 guns fired over 3000 rounds.

Once Rome was captured in June and the Germans pulled back to the Gothic Line, 12 AA Bde moved up, providing one HAA battery to each divisional artillery in X Corps, the remainder guarding airfields and river crossings in the Tiber Valley.

The regiment served through the rest of the Italian Campaign until the end of the war. 57 (Wessex) HAA Rgt was officially placed in suspended animation on 15 January 1946, but was actually retained as a cadre on 1 March.

== Postwar years ==
=== 74 HAA Regiment ===
The war service personnel of 57 HAA Rgt continued under the old regimental and battery numbers until 1 April 1947 when they were redesignated 74 HAA Regiment in the Regular Army with the batteries reorganised as follows:

- 213 HAA Bty disbanded to resuscitate 95 Bty of 94/95 Field Bty, renumbered as 200 HAA Bty
- 214 HAA Bty disbanded to resuscitate 97 Bty of 96/97 Field Bty, renumbered as 202 HAA Bty
- 215 HAA Bty disbanded to resuscitate 98 Bty of 80/98 Field Bty, renumbered as 203 HAA Bty

This regiment and its batteries were placed in suspended animation on 30 July 1948. It was resuscitated in British Army of the Rhine on 1 December 1951 as a Light AA (LAA) regiment with the same three batteries as well as 230 and 231 Btys from the former 84 S/L Rgt [2 S/L Rgt]

200, 202 and 203 LAA Btys were disbanded on 1 May 1954, then on 15 April 1955 230 and 231 LAA Btys were redesignated to resuscitate 158 and 161 Btys of the disbanded 70 HAA Rgt. Finally, RHQ and the two remaining batteries were placed in suspended animation on 15 July 1958 and formally disbanded on 1 January 1962.

=== 457 (Wessex) HAA Regiment ===
When the TA was reconstituted on 1 January 1947, the TA regiment was reformed as 457 (Wessex) (Mixed) HAA Rgt ('Mixed' because it included members of the Women's Royal Army Corps; the Mixed designation was dropped in 1950–51). In the 10-year plan for the TA, the regiment was to form part of 73 AA Bde in 2 AA Group, but that only lasted a short while. In 1955, the regiment absorbed 428 HAA Regiment, formerly Princess Beatrice's Isle of Wight Rifles, which formed P (Princess Beatrice's Isle of Wight) Battery alongside Q (Portsmouth) and R (Gosport) Batteries. In 1963, the regiment absorbed 295 (Hampshire Carabiniers Yeomanry) HAA Regiment, and became 457 (Wessex) Heavy Air Defence Regiment, RA, (Hampshire Carabiniers Yeomanry).

In 1967, the regiment became infantry as C Company (Wessex Royal Artillery Princess Beatrice's) in the Hampshire and Isle of Wight Territorials, but when that regiment was subsumed into the Wessex Regiment the Royal Artillery and Hampshire Yeomanry links were discontinued. However, when 106 (Yeomanry) Regiment Royal Artillery was created in 1999, the old number '457' was revived for 457 (Hampshire Yeomanry) Battery.

== Commanders ==
=== Commanding Officers ===
The following served as commanding officer (CO) of the unit:

- Lt-Col Edwin Galt, 15 September 1865
- Lt-Col Charles Owen, formerly Royal Marine Light Infantry, 2 August 1876
- Col G.E. Twiss, 16 November 1881
- Col C.L. Reynolds, VD, 18 January 1899–1902
- Col Sir William Dupree, 1st Baronet, KCB, CH, VD, TD, 28 January 1905
- Lt-Col A.E. Cogswell, TD, 1910–14
- Lt-Col E.G. Cheke, 2 October 1911–1916
- Col Powell, 1916–18
- Lt-Col E. Flowers, TD
- Col O.S. Cameron, 1920–21
- Col P.J. House, TD, 19 January 1921–1928
- Col M.N.H. House, DSO, TD, 19 January 1929–1936
- Lt-Col L.W. White, TD, 19 January 1936–1940
- Lt-Col S. Barnes, OBE, TD, 1940–43
- Lt-Col E.C. Pollit, DSO, TD, 1943–45
- Lt-Col The Hon Patrick Seely, TD, 1947 (Note: The Hon Patrick Seely, third son of Brig-Gen 'Jack' Seeley, 1st Lord Mottistone, was commissioned 2/Lt in the 95th (Hampshire Yeomanry) Field Brigade, RA, on 26 June 1931, then Lt in the 57th (Wessex) 27 June 1934. He was re-commissioned in May 1939, and became the regiment's first commanding officer after it was reformed in 1947.)
- Lt-Col R.H. Willis, OBE, TD, 1947–52
- Col E. Waddington, OBE, MC, TD, 1952–56
- Lt-Col K.A.J.G. Bermingham, OBE, TD, 1956

=== Honorary Colonels ===
The following served as Honorary Colonel of the unit:

- Alfred B. Sturdee, appointed 14 September 1869
- Gen Sir George Willis, CMG, appointed 4 October 1890
- Field Marshal Earl Roberts, VC, appointed 15 August 1901
- Col Sir William Dupree, 1st Baronet, (former CO), appointed 16 April 1915
- Brig I.S. Cameron, DSO, (former CO), appointed 5 August 1933
- Col Sir William Dupree, 2nd Baronet, (served with 1st Wessex in World War I) 1947–51
- Maj-Gen M.N. Dewing, CB, CBE, DSO, MC, appointed 1951

== Memorials ==
There is a memorial plaque on the seafront at Hayling Island to 219 Bty, 57 HAA Regiment. Unveiled in July 1994, it lists the names of six men of the battery killed during a German air raid on Portsmouth and Hayling Island on the night of 17/18 April 1941.

There is also a memorial bench in Walpole Road, Gosport, dedicated to 215 Bty, 57 HAA Regiment, and the Wessex Drill Hall that stood nearby. It was dedicated in 2006.

== Re-enactment group ==
The Palmerston Forts Society has a re-enactment group, the Portsdown Artillery Volunteers, based on the 2nd Hants Artillery Volunteers.
