= Ilkeston (constituency) =

Parliamentary constituency in the United Kingdom, 1885–1983

- Former county constituency for the House of Commons
- Ilkeston in Derbyshire, 1974–1983

1885–1983
- Seats: one
- Created from: Derbyshire South
- Replaced by: Amber Valley and Erewash

Ilkeston is a former United Kingdom Parliamentary constituency. It was a constituency of the House of Commons of the Parliament of the United Kingdom. It was represented by one Member of Parliament. In 1983 it was abolished, together with South East Derbyshire, when the Derbyshire county constituencies were redrawn - the constituencies of Amber Valley and Erewash were created and the constituency of South Derbyshire was re-created.

== Boundaries ==
1885–1918: The Sessional Division of Smalley, and the parishes of Breaston, Draycott and Wilne, Hopwell, Longeaton, Ockbrook, Risley, and Sawley and Wilsthorpe in the Sessional Division of Derby.

1918–1950: The Municipal Borough of Ilkeston, the Urban Districts of Heanor and Ripley, and the Rural District which consisted of the parishes of Codnor Park and Shipley.

1950–1983: The Municipal Borough of Ilkeston, the Urban Districts of Alfreton, Heanor, and Ripley, and in the Rural District of Belper the parish of Shipley.

== History ==
The seat was represented by Liberal-affiliated candidates from its creation in 1885 until 1922, when Labour gained it for the first time. Aside from being gained from the National Labour party in 1931 (by a majority of just 2 votes), Ilkeston became one of the Labour Party's safest seats in the country for decades, regularly getting majorities between 20 to 30,000 votes, dominated as it was by heavy industries like coal mining and engineering, though the majorities gradually declined throughout the 1970s, with the seat being abolished and incorporated into a new marginal constituency (Erewash), which was more favourable to the Conservatives and became an important Bellwether constituency from the 1980s onwards.

== Members of Parliament ==
Election	Member	Party
1885	Thomas Watson	Liberal
1887	Sir Walter Foster	Liberal
1910	Jack Seely	Liberal
1916	Jack Seely	Coalition Liberal
Jan 1922	Jack Seely	National Liberal
Nov 1922	George Oliver	Labour
1931	Abraham Flint	National Labour
1935	George Oliver	Labour
1964	Ray Fletcher	Labour
1983	constituency abolished	

== Elections ==
=== Elections in the 1880s ===
General election 1885: Ilkeston
Party	Candidate	Votes	%
Liberal	Thomas Watson	5,780	60.4
Conservative	William Drury Nathaniel Drury-Lowe	3,793	39.6
Majority		1,987	20.8
Turnout		9,573	89.8
Registered electors		10,660	
Liberal win (new seat)			

General election 1886: Ilkeston
Party	Candidate	Votes	%	±%
Liberal	Thomas Watson	4,621	54.9	−5.5
Conservative	Samuel Leeke	3,793	45.1	+5.5
Majority		828	9.8	−11.0
Turnout		8,414	78.9	−10.9
Registered electors		10,660		
Liberal hold		Swing	−5.5	

Watson's death caused a by-election.

Sir Walter Foster

By-election, 24 Mar 1887: Ilkeston
Party	Candidate	Votes	%	±%
Liberal	Balthazar Foster	5,512	56.9	+2.0
Conservative	Samuel Leeke	4,180	43.1	−2.0
Majority		1,332	13.8	+4.0
Turnout		9,692	88.5	+9.6
Registered electors		10,948		
Liberal hold		Swing	+2.0	

=== Elections in the 1890s ===
General election 1892: Ilkeston
Party	Candidate	Votes	%	±%
Liberal	Balthazar Foster	6,185	58.4	+3.5
Conservative	Samuel Leeke	4,402	41.6	−3.5
Majority		1,783	16.8	+7.0
Turnout		10,587	78.2	−0.7
Registered electors		13,541		
Liberal hold		Swing	+3.5	

General election 1895: Ilkeston
Party	Candidate	Votes	%	±%
Liberal	Balthazar Foster	6,215	54.2	−4.2
Conservative	Edward Picton Baumgarten	5,254	45.8	+4.2
Majority		961	8.4	−8.4
Turnout		11,469	87.1	+8.9
Registered electors		13,175		
Liberal hold		Swing	−4.2	

=== Elections in the 1900s ===
General election 1900: Ilkeston
Party	Candidate	Votes	%	±%
Liberal	Balthazar Foster	6,633	53.8	−0.4
Conservative	Henry Wright	5,698	46.2	+0.4
Majority		935	7.6	−0.8
Turnout		12,331	84.9	−2.2
Registered electors		14,519		
Liberal hold		Swing	−0.4	

General election 1906: Ilkeston
Party	Candidate	Votes	%	±%
Liberal	Balthazar Foster	9,655	64.3	+10.5
Conservative	LC Tipper	5,358	35.7	−10.5
Majority		4,297	28.6	+21.0
Turnout		15,013	87.2	+2.3
Registered electors		17,216		
Liberal hold		Swing	+10.5	

=== Elections in the 1910s ===
General election January 1910: Ilkeston
Party	Candidate	Votes	%	±%
Liberal	Balthazar Foster	10,632	62.3	−2.0
Conservative	Forbes St John Morrow	6,432	37.7	+2.0
Majority		4,200	24.6	−4.0
Turnout		17,064	87.7	+0.5
Registered electors		19,467		
Liberal hold		Swing	−2.0	

Seely

1910 Ilkeston by-election
Party	Candidate	Votes	%	±%
Liberal	John Seely	10,204	59.8	−2.5
Conservative	Henry Wright	6,871	40.2	+2.5
Majority		3,333	19.6	−5.0
Turnout		17,075	87.7	0.0
Registered electors		19,467		
Liberal hold		Swing	−2.5	

General election December 1910: Ilkeston
Party	Candidate	Votes	%	±%
Liberal	John Seely	9,990	62.7	+0.4
Conservative	William Marshall Freeman	5,946	37.3	−0.4
Majority		4,044	25.4	+0.8
Turnout		15,936	81.9	−5.8
Registered electors		19,467		
Liberal hold		Swing	+0.4	

1912 Ilkeston by-election
Party	Candidate	Votes	%	±%
Liberal	John Seely	9,049	53.6	−9.1
Unionist	William Marshall Freeman	7,838	46.4	+9.1
Majority		1,211	7.2	−18.2
Turnout		16,887	81.7	−0.2
Registered electors		20,670		
Liberal hold		Swing	−9.1	

General Election 1914–15:

Another General Election was required to take place before the end of 1915. The political parties had been making preparations for an election to take place and by July 1914, the following candidates had been selected;

- Liberal: John Seely
- Unionist: William Marshall Freeman

General election 1918: Ilkeston
Party		Candidate	Votes	%
C	National Liberal	John Seely	9,660	54.8
	Labour	George Oliver	7,962	45.2
Majority			1,698	9.6
Turnout			17,622	61.0
Registered electors			28,896	
	National Liberal win (new boundaries)			
C indicates candidate endorsed by the coalition government.

=== Elections in the 1920s ===
General election 1922: Ilkeston
Party	Candidate	Votes	%	±%
Labour	George Oliver	9,432	40.0	−5.2
National Liberal	John Seely	8,348	35.3	−19.5
Unionist	William Marshall Freeman	5,841	24.7	New
Majority		1,084	4.7	N/A
Turnout		23,621	76.8	+15.8
Registered electors		30,738		
Labour gain from National Liberal		Swing	+7.1	

Thomas Casey

General election 1923: Ilkeston
Party	Candidate	Votes	%	±%
Labour	George Oliver	9,191	42.1	+2.1
Unionist	William Marshall Freeman	6,566	30.0	+5.3
Liberal	Thomas Worrall Casey	6,112	27.9	−7.4
Majority		2,625	12.1	+7.4
Turnout		21,869	69.4	−7.4
Registered electors		31,503		
Labour hold		Swing	−1.6	

Anna Barlow

General election 1924: Ilkeston
Party	Candidate	Votes	%	±%
Labour	George Oliver	11,011	44.9	+2.8
Unionist	Victor Raikes	9,203	37.5	+7.5
Liberal	Anna Barlow	4,320	17.6	−10.3
Majority		1,808	7.4	−4.7
Turnout		24,534	76.1	+6.7
Registered electors		32,243		
Labour hold		Swing	−2.4	

General election 1929: Ilkeston
Party	Candidate	Votes	%	±%
Labour	George Oliver	20,202	59.0	+14.1
Liberal	John Vincent Shaw	7,766	22.7	+5.1
Unionist	Victor Raikes	6,258	18.3	−19.2
Majority		12,436	36.3	+28.9
Turnout		34,226	80.7	+4.6
Registered electors		42,430		
Labour hold		Swing	+4.5	

=== Elections in the 1930s ===
General election 1931: Ilkeston
Party	Candidate	Votes	%	±%
National Labour	Abraham Flint	17,587	50.1	N/A
Labour	George Oliver	17,585	49.9	−9.0
Majority		2	<0.01	N/A
Turnout		35,172	79.7	−1.0
Registered electors		44,116		
National Labour gain from Labour		Swing		

General election 1935: Ilkeston
Party	Candidate	Votes	%	±%
Labour	George Oliver	23,851	64.3	+14.3
National (Conservative)	Charles Markham	13,250	35.7	−14.3
Majority		10,601	28.6	N/A
Turnout		37,101	81.7	+2.0
Registered electors		45,427		
Labour gain from National Labour		Swing	+14.3	

=== Elections in the 1940s ===
General Election 1939–40: Another General Election was required to take place before the end of 1940. The political parties had been making preparations for an election to take place from 1939 and by the end of this year, the following candidates had been selected;

- Labour: George Oliver
- Conservative:
- Liberal:

General election 1945: Ilkeston
Party	Candidate	Votes	%	±%
Labour	George Oliver	26,536	66.8	+2.5
Conservative	Philip Hartley	8,439	21.3	–14.4
Liberal	Charles Foster	4,720	11.9	N/A
Majority		18,097	45.5	+16.9
Turnout		39,695	81.1	−0.6
Registered electors		49,007		
Labour hold		Swing		

=== Elections in the 1950s ===
General election 1950: Ilkeston
Party	Candidate	Votes	%
Labour	George Oliver	39,495	64.9
Liberal	Geoffrey Eugene MacPherson	11,262	18.5
Conservative	DFR Evans	10,113	16.6
Majority		28,233	46.4
Turnout		60,870	88.5
Registered electors		68,769	
Labour win (new boundaries)			

General election 1951: Ilkeston
Party	Candidate	Votes	%	±%
Labour	George Oliver	40,671	67.41	
Conservative	C Frank Baker	10,273	17.03	
Liberal	Geoffrey Eugene MacPherson	9,387	15.56	
Majority		30,398	50.38	
Turnout		60,331	86.5	
Registered electors		69,773		
Labour hold		Swing		

General election 1955: Ilkeston
Party	Candidate	Votes	%	±%
Labour	George Oliver	38,961	69.29	
Conservative	John Farr	17,268	30.71	
Majority		21,693	38.58	
Turnout		56,229	80.37	
Registered electors		69,967		
Labour hold		Swing		

General election 1959: Ilkeston
Party	Candidate	Votes	%	±%
Labour	George Oliver	39,930	68.59	
Conservative	Gerald Ivan Walters	18,286	31.41	
Majority		21,644	37.18	
Turnout		58,216	83.50	
Registered electors		69,719		
Labour hold		Swing		

=== Elections in the 1960s ===
General election 1964: Ilkeston
Party	Candidate	Votes	%	±%
Labour	Ray Fletcher	33,924	60.2	−8.6
Conservative	Jeffery Nicholas Lewis Tillett	13,542	24.0	−7.4
Liberal	Peggy Edwards	8,930	15.8	New
Majority		20,382	36.2	−1.0
Turnout		56,396	82.0	
Registered electors		68,796		
Labour hold		Swing		

General election 1966: Ilkeston
Party	Candidate	Votes	%	±%
Labour	Ray Fletcher	36,522	70.09	
Conservative	Basil J Eales	15,582	29.91	
Majority		20,940	40.18	
Turnout		52,104	76.20	
Registered electors		68,478		
Labour hold		Swing		

=== Elections in the 1970s ===
General election 1970: Ilkeston
Party	Candidate	Votes	%	±%
Labour	Ray Fletcher	32,961	59.9	−10.2
Conservative	Richard Beardsley	15,870	28.9	−1.0
Liberal	Wim Smit	6,157	11.2	New
Majority		17,091	31.0	−9.2
Turnout		54,988	74.15	−2.05
Registered electors		74,080		
Labour hold		Swing		

General election February 1974: Ilkeston
Party	Candidate	Votes	%	±%
Labour	Ray Fletcher	31,500	52.02	
Conservative	PM Morrell	17,320	28.60	
Liberal	Geoffrey Pool	11,734	19.38	
Majority		14,180	23.42	
Turnout		60,554	81.45	
Registered electors		74,378		
Labour hold		Swing		

General election October 1974: Ilkeston
Party	Candidate	Votes	%	±%
Labour	Ray Fletcher	31,153	54.96	
Conservative	A N R Hamilton	15,858	27.98	
Liberal	Geoffrey Pool	9,671	17.06	
Majority		15,295	27.25	
Turnout		56,682	74.85	
Registered electors		74,962		
Labour hold		Swing		

General election 1979: Ilkeston
Party	Candidate	Votes	%	±%
Labour	Ray Fletcher	29,270	50.61	
Conservative	Michael Clark	21,160	35.99	
Liberal	Desmond Blackburn	7,879	13.40	
Majority		8,110	14.62	
Turnout		58,309	78.1	
Registered electors		75,305		
Labour hold		Swing		

== See also ==
- List of former United Kingdom Parliament constituencies
- Unreformed House of Commons
