= Baron Mottistone =

Barony in the Peerage of the United Kingdom

Baron Mottistone, of Mottistone in the County of Southampton, is a title in the Peerage of the United Kingdom. It was created in 1933 for the soldier and Liberal politician J. E. B. Seely. He was the fourth son of Sir Charles Seely, 1st Baronet, and the uncle of The 1st Baron Sherwood. The 4th Baron Mottistone succeeded his half-brother in 1966 (who in his turn had succeeded his elder brother in 1963). He notably served Lord Lieutenant of the Isle of Wight from 1986 to 1995 and as the last governor of the Isle of Wight between 1992 and 1995 and was succeeded by his son as the fifth baron, in 2011. In turn, the fifth baron was succeeded by his elder son in 2013.

== Barons Mottistone (1933) ==
- John Edward Bernard "Jack" Seely, 1st Baron Mottistone (1868–1947)
- Henry John Alexander Seely, 2nd Baron Mottistone (1899–1963)
- Arthur Patrick William Seely, 3rd Baron Mottistone (1905–1966)
- David Peter Seely, 4th Baron Mottistone (1920–2011)
- Peter John Philip Seely, 5th Baron Mottistone (1949–2013)
- Christopher David Peter Seely, 6th Baron Mottistone (b. 1974)

The heir presumptive is the present baron's younger brother Hon. Richard William Anthony Seely (b. 1988).

Coat of arms of Baron Mottistone

Crest
In front of three ears of wheat banded Or the trunk of a tree fesswise eradicated and sprouting to the dexter Proper.
Escutcheon
Azure three ears of wheat banded Or between two martlets in pale and as many chaplets of roses in fess Argent.
Supporters
On either side a sea horse (hippocampus) Azure gorged with a mural crown and charged on the shoulder with a maple leaf Or.
Motto
In Deo Spero

== See also ==
- Seely Baronets, of Sherwood Lodge and Brooke House
