= Raymond Fletcher =

British Labour Party politician (1921–1991)

Leopold Raymond Fletcher (3 December 1921 – 16 March 1991) was a Labour Party politician.

== Early life and military career ==
Fletcher served in the British Army (1941–48) in East Asia, Southwest Asia and the British Army of the Rhine. He subsequently worked as military advisor on Joan Littlewood's Oh, What a Lovely War!. He became a journalist, author and lecturer and wrote two plays.

== Parliamentary career ==
Fletcher contested Wycombe in 1955. He was Member of Parliament for Ilkeston from 1964 to 1983. He was deselected by his local party in December 1981. The seat was abolished in the 1983 boundary changes.

== Spy allegations ==
He was revealed as a spy for the Soviet Union according to the records furnished by Vasili Mitrokhin, who arrived in the West after the Cold War.

The widow of the late Labour MP angrily denied the accusation that he was a Russian spy and claimed that he had, in fact, carried out missions for MI6. Catherine Fletcher maintained that not only was her husband an anti-Communist, but he had been asked to use his left-wing influence on behalf of Margaret Thatcher when she was Prime Minister to persuade Bettino Craxi to stand for the post of Italian premier.

== See also ==
- Mitrokhin Archive

Parliament of the United Kingdom
| Preceded by George Oliver | Member of Parliament for Ilkeston; 1964 – 1983 | Constituency abolished |
