= Richard Webster, 1st Viscount Alverstone =

British barrister, politician and judge (1842–1915)

The Right Honourable The Viscount Alverstone GCMG PC FRS
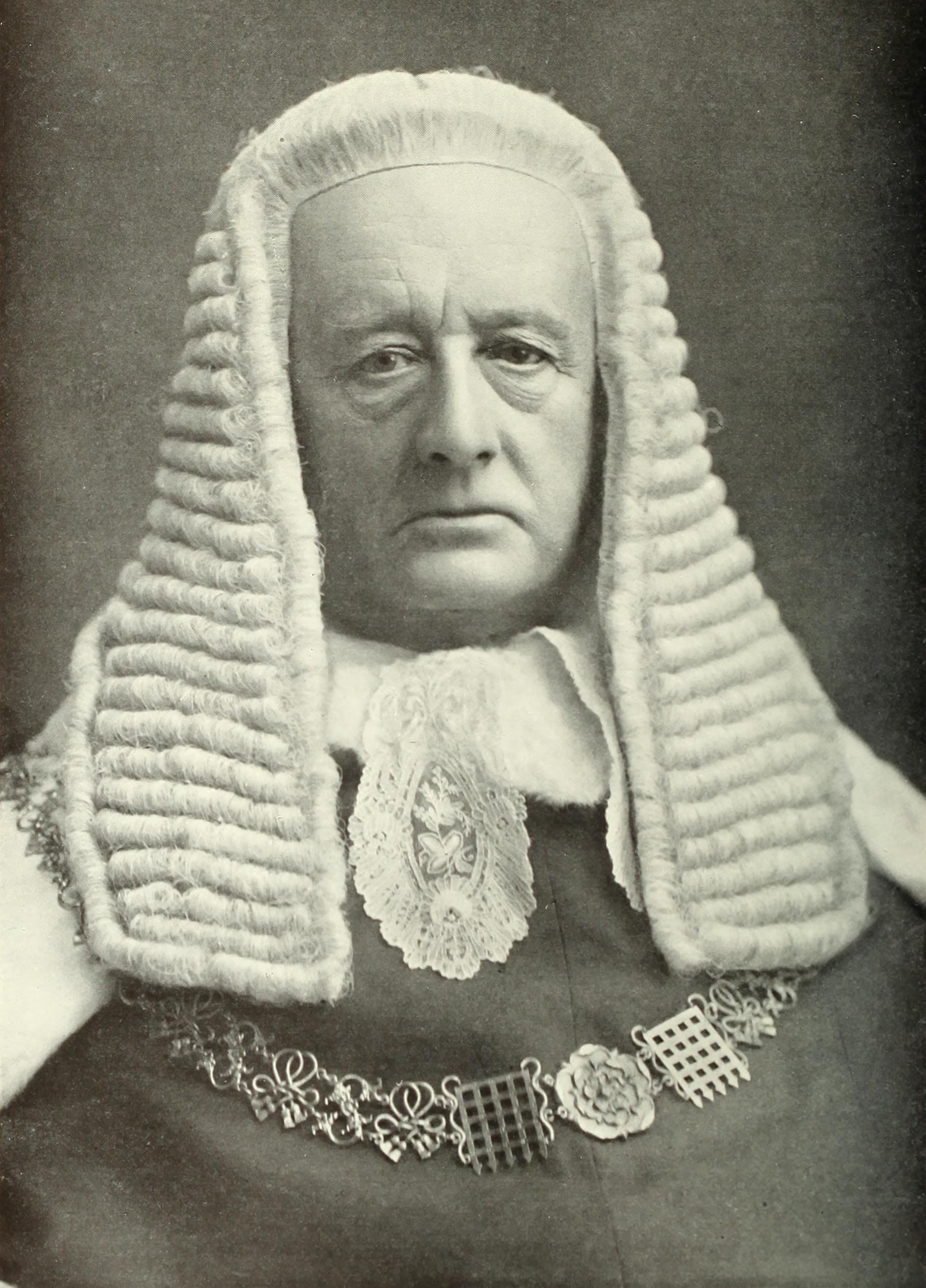

Lord Chief Justice of England
- In office 24 October 1900 – 21 October 1913
- Monarchs: Queen Victoria; Edward VII; George V
- Preceded by: The Lord Russell of Killowen
- Succeeded by: The Earl of Reading

Master of the Rolls
- In office 9 May 1900 – 24 October 1900
- Monarch: Queen Victoria
- Prime Minister: The Marquess of Salisbury
- Preceded by: Sir Nathaniel Lindley
- Succeeded by: Sir Archibald Levin Smith

Attorney General for England
- In office 27 June 1885 – 28 January 1886
- Monarch: Queen Victoria
- Prime Minister: The Marquess of Salisbury
- Preceded by: Sir Henry James
- Succeeded by: Sir Charles Russell
- In office 5 August 1886 – 11 August 1892
- Monarch: Queen Victoria
- Prime Minister: The Marquess of Salisbury
- Preceded by: Sir Charles Russell
- Succeeded by: Sir Charles Russell
- In office 8 July 1895 – 7 May 1900
- Monarch: Queen Victoria
- Prime Minister: The Marquess of Salisbury
- Preceded by: Sir Robert Reid
- Succeeded by: Sir Robert Finlay

Personal details
- Born: Richard Everard Webster; 22 December 1842 Holborn, London; United Kingdom
- Died: 15 December 1915 (aged 72) Cranleigh, Surrey; United Kingdom
- Resting place: West Norwood Cemetery; Lambeth, London; United Kingdom
- Party: Conservative
- Education: Trinity College, Cambridge
- Occupation: Barrister, judge

Richard Everard Webster, 1st Viscount Alverstone, GCMG, PC, FRS (22 December 1842 – 15 December 1915) was a British barrister, politician and judge who served in many high political and judicial offices.

== Background and education ==
Webster was the second son of Thomas Webster QC and Elizabeth Calthrop. He was educated at King's College School and Charterhouse, and Trinity College, Cambridge. He was well known as an athlete in his earlier years, having represented his university in the first inter-varsity steeplechase and as a runner. As such, the Cambridge University Alverstone Club is named in his honour, and makes a pilgrimage to Alverstone, Isle of Wight, every four years.

His interest in cricket and foot-racing was maintained in later life. He refereed races for the early Amateur Athletic Club and set rules for long jump and shot put. He was President of Surrey County Cricket Club from 1895 until his death, and of the Marylebone Cricket Club in 1903.

== Legal, judicial and political career ==
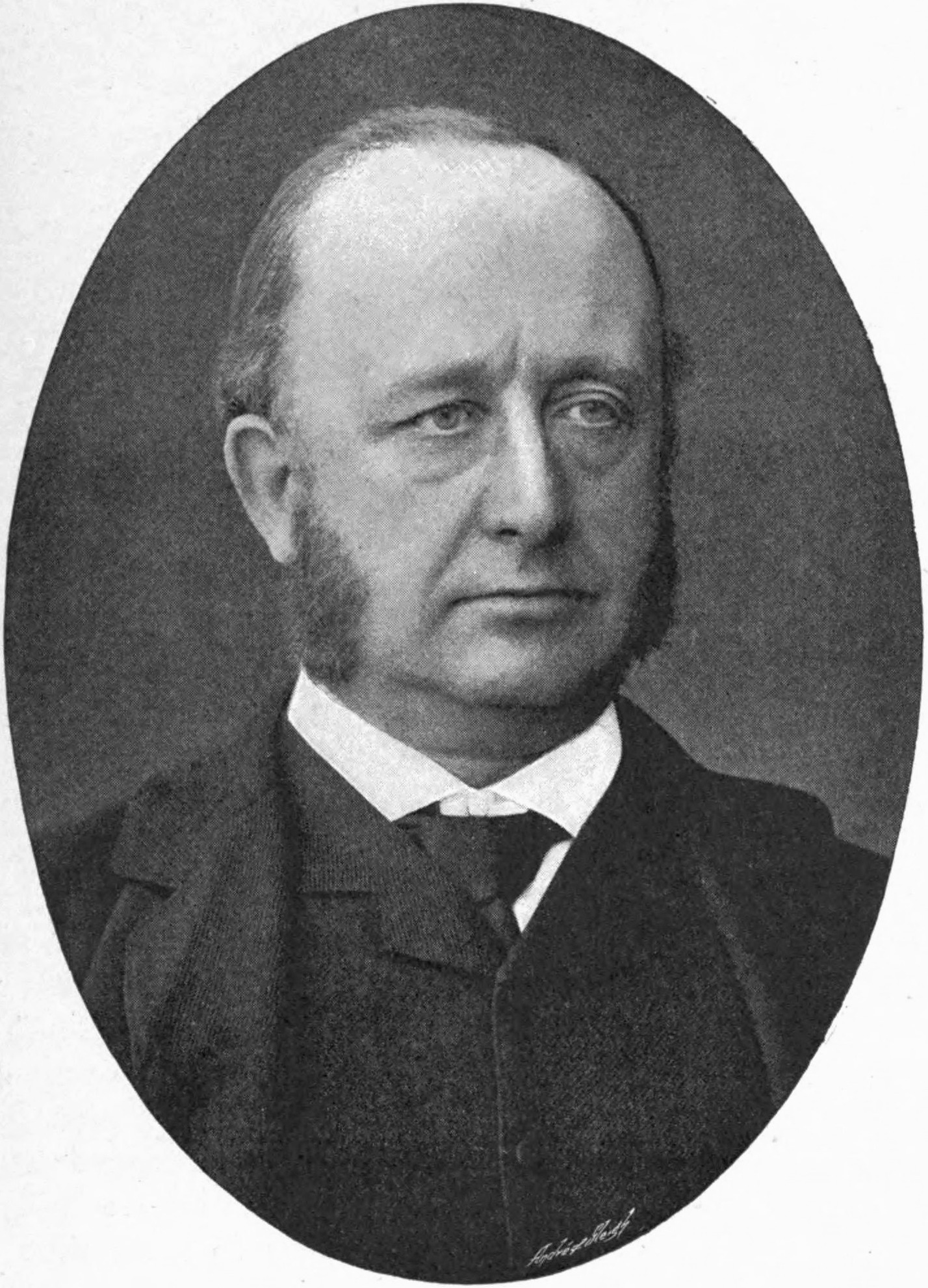
Webster in the 1890s

Webster was called to the bar in 1868, and became QC only ten years afterwards. His practice was chiefly in commercial, railway and patent cases until (June 1885) he was appointed Attorney-General in the Conservative Government in the exceptional circumstances of never having been Solicitor-General, and not at the time occupying a seat in parliament. As Attorney General Webster was prosecuting in the Eliza Armstrong case, in the autumn of 1885, a major scandal widely reported in the press, involving a child supposedly bought for prostitution for the purpose of exposing the evils of white slavery. It led to the Criminal Law Amendment Act 1885. He was elected for Launceston in the following month, and in November exchanged this seat for the Isle of Wight, which he continued to represent until his elevation to the House of Lords. Except under the brief Gladstone administration of 1886, and the Gladstone-Rosebery cabinet of 1892–1895, Sir Richard Webster was Attorney-General from 1885 to 1900.

In 1890 he was leading counsel for The Times in the Parnell inquiry; in 1893 he represented Great Britain in the Bering Sea arbitration; in 1898 he discharged the same function in the matter of the boundary between British Guiana and Venezuela.

In the House of Commons, and outside it, his political career was prominently associated with church work; and his speeches were distinguished for gravity and earnestness. In July 1885, he was made a Knight Bachelor. In December 1893, he was appointed to the Order of St Michael and St George as a Knight Grand Cross. In January 1900 he was created a Baronet, but in May the same year succeeded Sir Nathaniel Lindley as Master of the Rolls, being raised to the peerage as Baron Alverstone, of Alverstone in the County of Southampton and sworn of the Privy Council, and in October of the same year he was elevated to the office of Lord Chief Justice upon the death of Lord Russell of Killowen. He presided over some notable trials of the era including Hawley Harvey Crippen. In the 1981 Granada Television series Lady Killers he was played by Lewis Shaw in an depiction of the trial.

Although popular, he was not considered an outstanding judge; one colleague wrote after his death that "the reports will be searched in vain for judgments of his that are valuable". He received the honorary degree Doctor of Laws (LL.D.) from the University of Edinburgh in April 1902, and was elected a Fellow of the Royal Society later the same year. In late 1902 he was in South Africa as part of a commission looking into the use of martial law sentences during the Second Boer War.

In 1903 during the Alaska boundary dispute he was one of the members of the Boundary Commission. Against the wishes of the Canadians it was his swing vote that settled the matter, roughly splitting the disputed territory. As a result, he became extremely unpopular in Canada.

He retired in 1913, and was created Viscount Alverstone, of Alverstone, Isle of Wight in the County of Southampton.

In 1914, Webster published Recollections of Bar and Bench.

== Personal life ==
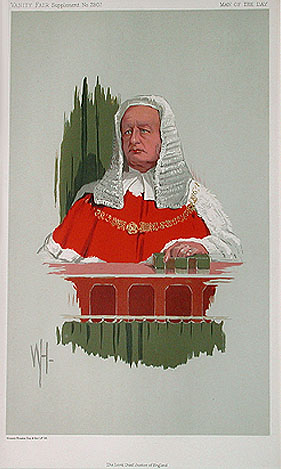
Alverstone caricatured by WH for Vanity Fair, 1913

Webster married in 1872 Louisa Mary Calthrop, daughter of William Charles Calthrop. She died in March 1877. They had one son and one daughter. Their only son, the Honourable Arthur Harold Webster (born 1874), died childless in August 1902, aged 28, after an operation for appendicitis. The Arthur Webster Hospital, opened in 1905, was presented to the town of Shanklin, Isle of Wight by Lord Alverstone in memory of his son. The building is still in use as the Arthur Webster Clinic.

He commissioned the architect Edward Blakeway I'Anson to build Winterfold House near Cranleigh in the Surrey Hills in 1886, in a classic late Victorian style, and laid out grounds with flowering trees and shrubs.

Lord Alverstone died at Cranleigh, Surrey, on 15 December 1915, aged 72 and was buried at West Norwood Cemetery under a Celtic cross. His peerages became extinct on his death.

== Arms ==
Coat of arms of Richard Webster, 1st Viscount Alverstone
Crest A Swan's Head erased Argent encircled by an Annulet Azure and holding in the beak a like Annulet Escutcheon Azure two Pallets Or five Swans in cross Argent between four Annulets Gold Supporters On either side a Seal proper gorged with a Chain of Annulets interlaced Or suspended therefrom an Escutcheon Azure charged with a Swan Argent

Parliament of the United Kingdom
Preceded by Sir Hardinge Giffard	Member of Parliament for Launceston; 1885–1885	Succeeded by Thomas Dyke Acland
Preceded by Evelyn Ashley	Member of Parliament for Isle of Wight; 1885–1900	Succeeded by J. E. B. Seely
Legal offices
Preceded by Sir Henry James	Attorney General for England and Wales; 1885–1886	Succeeded by Sir Charles Russell
Preceded by Sir Charles Russell	Attorney General for England and Wales; 1886–1892	Succeeded by Sir Charles Russell
Preceded by Sir Robert Reid	Attorney General for England and Wales; 1895–1900	Succeeded by Sir Robert Finlay
Preceded by Sir Nathaniel Lindley	Master of the Rolls; 1900	Succeeded by Sir Archibald Smith
Preceded by The Lord Russell of Killowen	Lord Chief Justice of England; 1900–1913	Succeeded by Sir Rufus Isaacs
Baronetage of the United Kingdom
Preceded by Usher baronets	Webster baronets of Alverstone; 25 January 1900	Succeeded by Newton baronets
