= Alverstone Athletic Club =

University of Cambridge athletic club

The Alverstone Athletic Club is an athletics club at the University of Cambridge.

The club was formed on November 27th 1920 and is named after Richard Webster, 1st Viscount Alverstone.

The Cambridge University Athletic Club contained multiple Olympians in the 1920s, creating intense competition for places in the team selected to compete against Oxford.

The Alverstone Club was created for athletes who "just miss their Blues or half-Blues" as well as those who won them.

The equivalent club at the University of Oxford is the Centipedes Athletic Club.

== Standards ==
Prior to the advent of the second-team varsity match athletes had to meet a minimum performance standard to qualify for membership of the Alverstone Club.

The Alverstone standards were recorded in the Alverstone Club Minutes on 20 Nov 1925 and approved by Lord Burghley, who was then honorary secretary of Cambridge University Athletic Club.

1925 Alverstone Standards
Event	Standard
100 yards	10.4 s
1/4 mile	52 s
1/2 mile	2:02
1 mile	4:35
2 miles	10:00
3 miles	15:30
120 yards hurdles	16.8 s
220 yards hurdles	26.4 s
High Jump	5' 7"
Long Jump	21'
Weight [Shot Put]	38'
Pole Jump [Pole Vault]	10' 6"

The 1925 Alverstone mile standard was 25 seconds slower than Paavo Nurmi's 4:10.4 mile world record.

The Alverstone standards have continually been updated as more events have been added and athletics records have evolved.

The Alverstone standards are now also used to determine whether an athlete meets the performance requirements for the award of a half-Blue in the men's first team athletics varsity match.

== Men's Second Team Varsity Match ==
The first men's second team athletics varsity match was held at Fenner's, Cambridge in 1949.

Cambridge men's second team compete as the Alverstone Club, while Oxford's compete as the Centipedes Club.

Representing Cambridge in the men's second team varsity match qualifies an athlete for membership of the Alverstone Club, regardless of whether they have achieved the Alverstone standard.

Athletes who have not competed in the second team varsity match can still qualify for membership if they achieve the Alverstone standard.

== Club colours ==
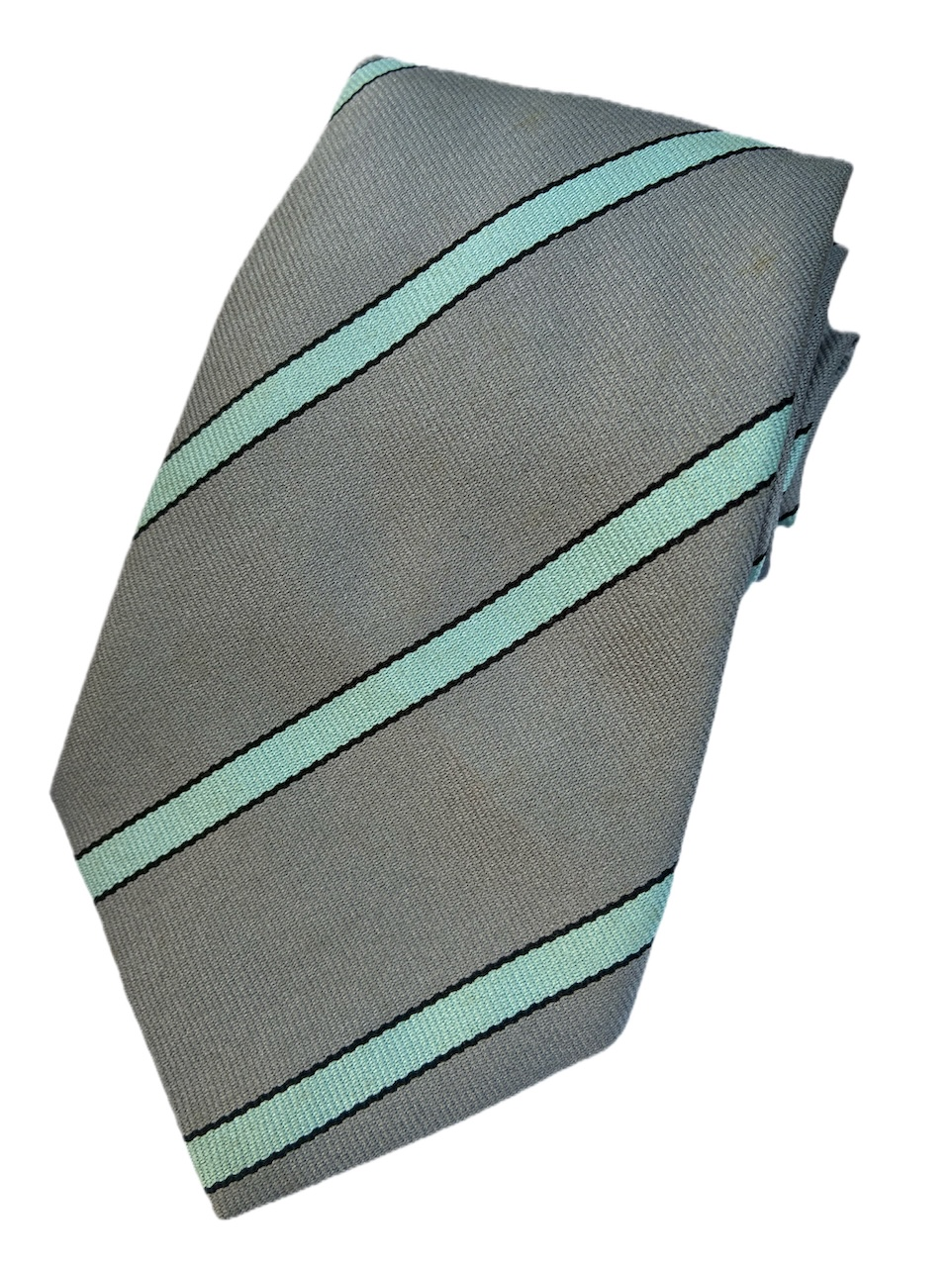
Alverstone Club Tie

The Alverstone Club colours are Cambridge blue, grey and black.

The club tie is predominately grey, with narrow Cambridge blue stripes and black pinstripes.

The tie was designed by Rex Salisbury Woods, who was also one of the founders of the club.

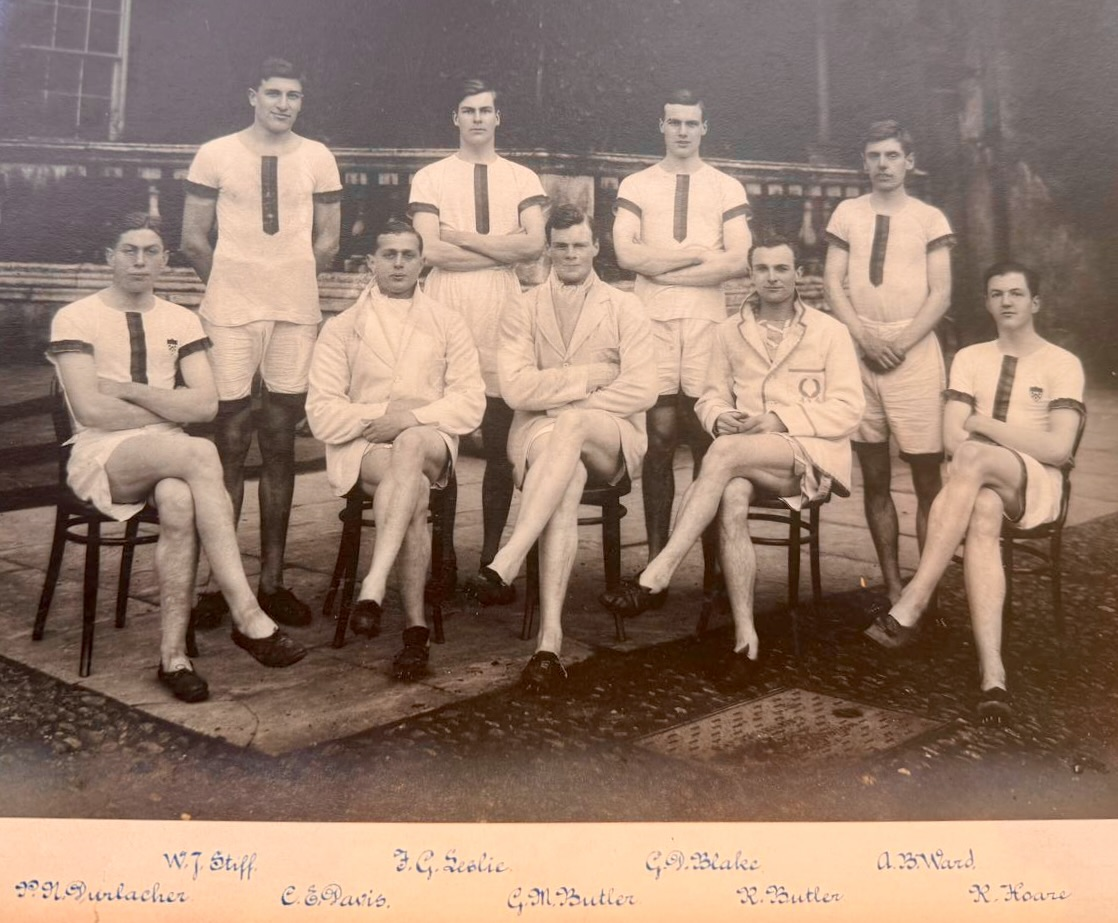
1922 Trinity College Relay Team. R.Butler wears an Alverstone Athletic Club blazer. G.M.Butler (1920 Olympic gold medallist) wears a full-blue blazer. C.E.Davis wears a half-blue blazer.

The club blazer is cream, with a Cambridge blue and grey and black trim on the edges and pockets.

The blazer badge is a laurel wreath with the letters "A.A.C." below.
