= Thomas Watson (silk spinner) =

English silk spinner and politician (1821–1887)

Thomas Watson (1821 – 7 March 1887), was an English silk spinner and Liberal Party politician.

Watson began life as a silk spinner. In 1846 with two fellow workers, he started a silk-spinning and hatter business in Rochdale. He was responsible for the invention of silk-plush for hat-making and became sole partner in the firm of Thomas Watson & Sons, silk-plush manufacturers of Rochdale. He funded a new infirmary for the town of Rochdale, became chairman of Rochdale School Board, and treasurer of the Free Church Denomination. He was also J.P. for Rochdale.

In the 1885 general election, Watson was elected as the Member of Parliament (MP) for Ilkeston. He retained the seat in the 1886 general election, but died in 1887 at the age of 66.

Parliament of the United Kingdom
New title	Member of Parliament for Ilkeston; 1885 – 1887	Succeeded by Sir Balthazar Foster
