= Sir William Dupree, 1st Baronet =

English brewer

Colonel Sir William Dupree Bt VD TD DL JP

Chairman of Portsmouth United Breweries

Personal details
- Born: William Thomas Dupree; 4 September 1856
- Died: 2 March 1933 (aged 76)

Colonel Sir William Thomas Dupree, 1st Baronet, VD, TD, DL, JP (4 September 1856 – 2 March 1933) was an English brewer.

Dupree originally worked for the Reading-based H & G Simonds Brewery. In the early 1890s he became manager of the Simonds brewery in Portsmouth, where he resided for the rest of his life. He later left to set up his own business, Portsmouth United Breweries. It became extremely successful and by the late 1920s was one of the largest breweries in Southern England. In 1927, it took over the Rock Brewery in Brighton and was renamed Portsmouth and Brighton United Breweries Ltd, still with Dupree as chairman.

Dupree served in the 2nd Hampshire Artillery Volunteers, Territorial Force and Territorial Army as an artillery officer for over forty years. He was a justice of the peace and alderman in Portsmouth and served as mayor three times, in 1901–1902, 1902–1903, and 1909–1910. He was mayor during the coronation of King Edward VII and Queen Alexandra and entertained naval officers from sixteen countries, for which he was knighted in the 1902 Birthday Honours.

In the 1921 New Year Honours, he was created a baronet, largely due to his support for the Industrial League. He unsuccessfully contested Portsmouth Central for the Conservative Party in 1918 and was a Deputy Lieutenant of Hampshire.

== Coat of arms ==
Coat of arms of Sir William Dupree, 1st Baronet
Crest A lion sejant Proper supporting with the dexter forepaw a flagstaff Proper flowing therefrom a banner vert charged with a mullet Or. Escutcheon Vert on a bend between two calves passant Or three mullets of the field. Motto Le Monde Est Mon Pré (The World Is My Field)

Baronetage of the United Kingdom
New creation	Baronet (of Craneswater); 1921–1933	Succeeded by William Dupree
