= Abraham Flint =

British barrister

Abraham John Flint DL (27 March 1903 – 23 January 1971) was a British barrister. He briefly enjoyed a political career, being elected to the House of Commons by the narrowest majority under universal franchise and serving for a single term as a supporter of National Labour. His contributions to Parliament were not substantial but his subsequent legal career flourished and he was a later made a judge.

== Family and early life ==
Flint was the son of Abraham Reginald Flint, who was a solicitor in Derby, and spent 40 years on Derby City Council. Flint was educated at Oundle School. In 1921, Flint went abroad and spent four years farming in New Zealand. On his return, he studied law, and was called to the Bar in 1929 from the Inner Temple. The next year, Flint married Eleanor Mary Jones, who was from Loughborough; they had two daughters together.

== 1931 general election ==
Up until the political crisis of 1931, Flint had been a member of the Labour Party, but he followed Ramsay MacDonald and supported the creation of the National Government. When a general election was called, Flint was pressed to stand in the Ilkeston division where Labour had a majority of 12,436 at the previous election. Flint's father was a local supporter of J. H. Thomas, one of the cabinet members who had followed MacDonald and a longstanding MP in Derby. Thomas persuaded Flint, who was not interested in a Parliamentary career, to stand in Ilkeston to relieve the electoral pressure in Derby. According to Thomas' biographer Gregory Blaxland, Thomas assured Flint that there was no chance of his winning, and Thomas arranged to speak for Flint. The bitterness of the split in Labour showed as Thomas was met with cries of "Judas!".

Flint had indeed been chosen to stand without any expectation of victory; Frank Markham wrote to MacDonald's secretary H.B. Usher on 13 October 1931 explaining that it was important to keep the sitting Labour MP in the constituency and stop him "speaking in other places where he would do much harm". Had he not stood, a Conservative Party candidate would have been found to stand. After the polls closed it became clear that the Ilkeston election was very close. There were four recounts overnight, and the Returning Officer decided to call a halt in the early hours to return later in the day. At the end of the fifth recount, the Returning Officer declared Flint elected by a majority of two votes over the sitting Labour MP. This result remains the joint smallest majority in any individual constituency election since universal suffrage.

== Parliamentary contributions ==
In the new Parliament, Flint was chosen to make his maiden speech by seconding the 'Loyal Address' at the opening of the first session in 1931. He opened by pointing to the narrowness of his election, saying that any two of his voters could claim responsibility for electing him, and went on to support the economic conference and the interdependence of the Empire. However, Flint was not an active member after this early start. In February 1933 he joined a delegation of National Labour MPs to the Minister of Health concerning the Government's Housing and Rent Restriction Bills. In April 1934 Flint made a speech in support of the Road Traffic Bill, calling for cyclists to carry compulsory lamps.

== Later life ==
Flint announced in July 1935 that he would not defend his seat at the next election, apparently because he stood no chance of winning. He continued his practice at the Bar, and in January 1952 represented the Conservative candidate for Lichfield and Tamworth in an action complaining of assault by a Labour Agent; Flint won damages for his client. In November 1957 Flint was elevated to the Judicial Bench as a Judge of Circuit No 18 (Nottingham). During the Second World War, Flint served in the Royal Artillery and rose to the rank of Major. He was appointed a Deputy Lieutenant of Nottinghamshire in August 1970.

Parliament of the United Kingdom
Preceded by George Oliver	Member of Parliament for Ilkeston; 1931 – 1935	Succeeded by George Oliver
