= Dupree baronets =

Extinct baronetcy in the Baronetage of the United Kingdom

The Dupree Baronetcy, of Craneswater, Portsmouth, in the County of Southampton, was a title in the Baronetage of the United Kingdom. It was created on 24 January 1921 for the brewer Sir William Dupree, chiefly in honour of his support for the Industrial League.

== Dupree baronets, of Craneswater (1921) ==
- Sir William Thomas Dupree, 1st Baronet (1856–1933)
- Sir William Dupree, 2nd Baronet (1882–1953)
- Sir Vernon Dupree, 3rd Baronet (1884–1971)
- Sir Victor Dupree, 4th Baronet (1887–1976)
- Sir Peter Dupree, 5th Baronet (1924–2006)
- Sir Thomas William James David Dupree, 6th Baronet (1930–2013)

The baronetcy became extinct on the death of the sixth baronet.

Coat of arms of Dupree baronets
Crest A lion sejant Proper supporting with the dexter forepaw a flagstaff Proper flowing therefrom a banner vert charged with a mullet Or. Escutcheon Vert on a bend between two calves passant Or three mullets of the field. Motto Le Monde Est Mon Pré (The World Is My Field)
