= 1887 Ilkeston by-election =

UK parliamentary by-election

The 1887 Ilkeston by-election was held on 24 March 1887 after the death of the incumbent Liberal MP Thomas Watson. The election was won by the Liberal candidate, Sir Balthazar Walter Foster.

Walter Foster

1887 Ilkeston by-election
Party	Candidate	Votes	%	±%
Liberal	Sir Balthazar Walter Foster	5,512	56.9	+2.0
Conservative	Samuel Leeke	4,180	43.1	−2.0
Majority		1,332	13.8	+4.0
Turnout		9,692	88.5	+9.6
Liberal hold		Swing	+2.0	
