= George Oliver (politician) =

British engineer, barrister and politician

George Harold Oliver QC

Member of Parliament for Ilkeston
- In office 1922–1931
- Preceded by: J. E. B. Seely
- Succeeded by: Abraham Flint
- Majority: 1,084

Member of Parliament for Ilkeston
- In office 1935–1964
- Preceded by: Abraham Flint
- Succeeded by: Raymond Fletcher
- Majority: 10,601

Parliamentary Under-Secretary of State to the Home Office
- In office 1945–1947
- Prime Minister: Clement Attlee
- Preceded by: The Earl of Munster
- Succeeded by: Kenneth Younger

Personal details
- Born: 24 November 1888 Bolton
- Died: 22 September 1984 (aged 95)
- Party: Labour

George Harold Oliver QC (24 November 1888 – 22 September 1984) was a British engineer, barrister and politician who was for a longtime Member of Parliament (MP) for Ilkeston and served briefly as a junior government minister.

== Early career ==
Oliver was born in Bolton and educated at Holy Trinity School in the town. He became an engineer working as a gear cutter for Rolls-Royce, and when the works were moved to Derby, he moved with them. He also joined the Amalgamated Society of Engineers and became shop steward of the works; his union activity brought him into the Labour Party and was elected to Derby Town Council as a Labour Party candidate. As an engineering worker he was not called up to fight in the First World War.

== Parliamentary candidate ==
At the 1918 general election Oliver fought Ilkeston, an area not far from Derby. He enjoyed a straight fight with J. E. B. Seely, a Coalition Liberal, but lost by 1,698 votes. He remained involved in the constituency; from 1921, he was organising agent of the Workers' Union. He was adopted again as candidate for the 1922 general election; this time he was successful by 1,084.

== Retraining ==
He was re-elected in 1923, and during the Labour government he seconded a motion calling for a national minimum wage. He also supported exemption from entertainments duty for charitable entertainments. After the Labour government lost a vote of no confidence, Oliver was again re-elected in the 1924 general election. He had determined to retrain as a trade union lawyer, and was called to the Bar by the Middle Temple in 1927. Shortly after he persuaded the Home Secretary to halt the planned hanging of one of his constituents who had been convicted of murder.

In March 1930 Oliver initiated a debate on the development of civilian air transport. He supported opening cinemas on Sundays, and also supported restrictions on the use of motor cars in elections, arguing that it was taking the opportunity to adjust the balance between rich and poor. However, Oliver could not survive the Conservative landslide at the 1931 general election: he lost by only two votes in the equal closest election result during universal franchise.

== Out of Parliament ==
Out of Parliament, Oliver worked as a Barrister for the Transport and General Workers Union. He acted for the union at an inquest into the poisoning deaths of three workers at the British Celanese artificial silk factory at Spondon in 1934. At the 1935 general election he regained his seat by 10,601 votes.

When selected to introduce a Private Member's Bill in February 1936, Oliver chose to bring in a Bill to extend the jurisdiction of County Courts. He was also involved in the Labour Party conference in 1939, when he moved the expulsion from the party of Aneurin Bevan and three others because of their involvement in the 'Popular Front' movement attempting to build an alliance with the Liberal Party. In 1943 he was chair of the Labour Party Conference Arrangements Committee.

== Minister ==
Oliver was appointed Parliamentary Under-Secretary of State at the Home Office in the Attlee government in August 1945. He acted as chairman of a departmental committee looking into the electoral registration system from 1945 to 1947, which recommended a return to the system of street canvassing to get people registered to vote. He left the government in October 1947. In 1949 he was appointed as a King's Counsel.

Boundary changes gave him a very safe seat and in the 1951 general election his majority of 30,398 was the fourth largest in the country. In February 1952 he was chosen to be one of the members of the House of Commons to call on the Queen Mother to extend Parliament's condolences on the death of King George VI.

== Elder statesman ==
As an elder statesman, Oliver began to cast more dissenting votes. In July 1960 he supported a Conservative government motion supporting political and economic unity in Europe. In 1963 he was named to a committee investigating the pay for Members of Parliament. Oliver stood down at the 1964 general election, but lived to be 95.

== Sources ==
- M. Stenton and S. Lees, "Who's Who of British MPs" Vol. IV (Harvester Press, 1981)
- "Who Was Who", A & C Black
- "The Times House of Commons, 1929"

Parliament of the United Kingdom
Preceded by J. E. B. Seely	Member of Parliament for Ilkeston; 1922–1931	Succeeded by Abraham Flint
Preceded by Abraham Flint	Member of Parliament for Ilkeston; 1935–1964	Succeeded by Raymond Fletcher
Political offices
Preceded by The Earl of Munster	Parliamentary Under-Secretary of State to the Home Office; 1945–1947	Succeeded by Kenneth Younger
