= John Seely, 2nd Baron Mottistone =

British architect (1899–1963)

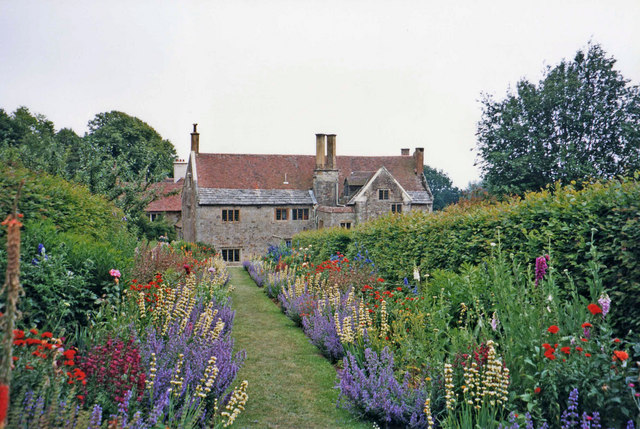
Mottistone Manor and Garden, Isle of Wight

Henry John Alexander Seely, 2nd Baron Mottistone, OBE (1 May 1899 – 18 January 1963) was an architect whose work in the partnership of Seely & Paget included the interior of Eltham Palace in the Art Deco style, and the post-World War II restoration of a number of bomb-damaged buildings, such as houses in the Little Cloister (Westminster Abbey), the London Charterhouse and the church of St John Clerkenwell.

== Biography ==
Henry John Alexander Seely was born on 1 May 1899, the son of John Seely, 1st Baron Mottistone, a British Army general and politician, and Emily Florence, daughter of Colonel Honourable Sir Henry George Louis Crichton.

He attended West Downs School, Winchester, an independent preparatory school, and then went to Harrow School and Trinity College, Cambridge where he read Architecture and met his future business partner, Paul Edward Paget, the son of the Bishop of Chester.

He served during World War I. His elder brother, 2Lt Frank Reginald Seely of the Royal Hampshire Regiment, was killed in action at the Battle of Arras.

After the War, he co-founded the architect firm of Seely & Paget. According to Paget, "it was just the marriage of two minds... we became virtually one person". They were inseparable in business and life, and referred to each other as "the partner". They lived and worked at 41 Cloth Fair, London, where the firm remained until 1986.

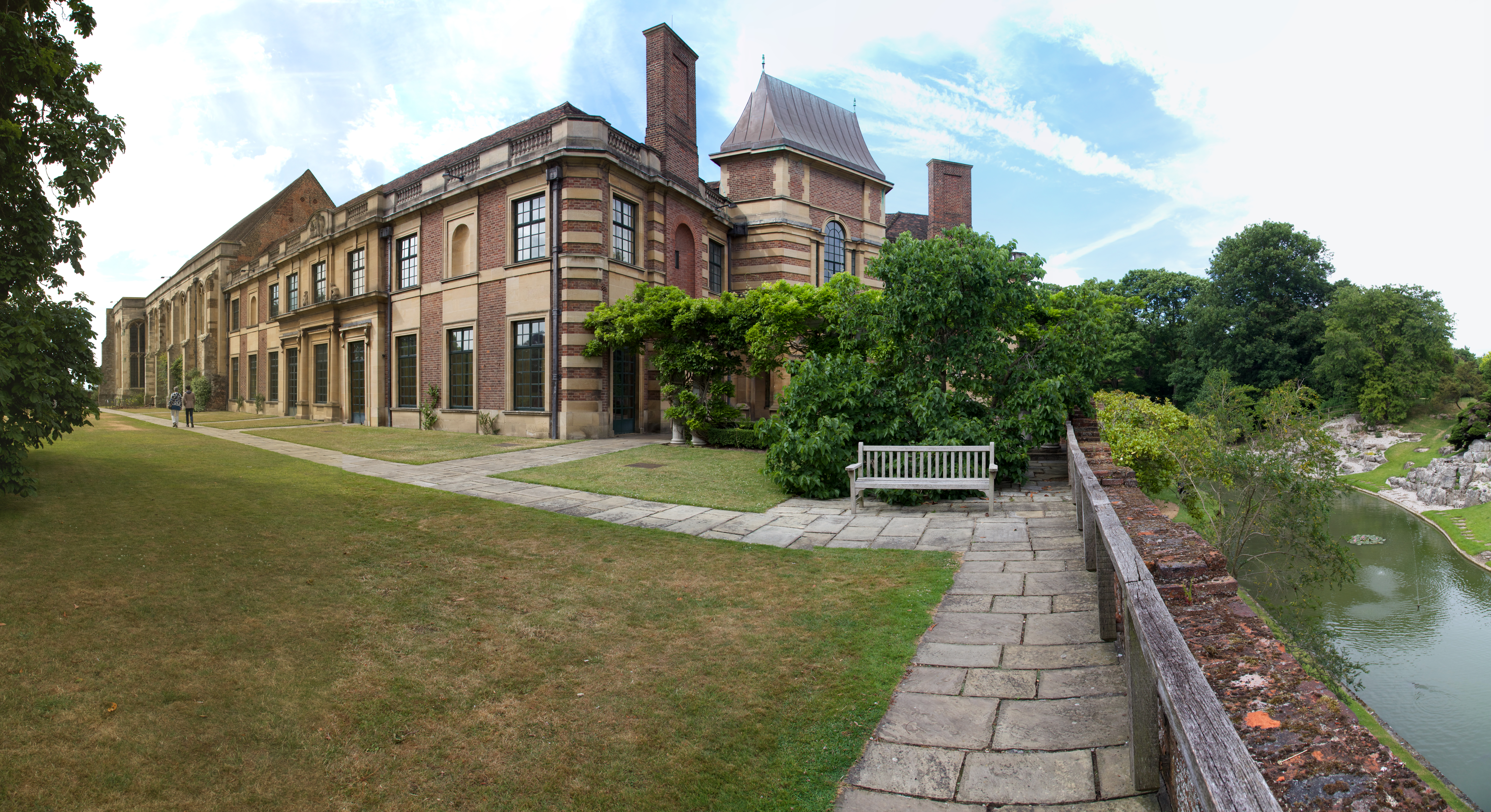
Eltham Palace exterior

The partnership's works included the remodelling of Mottistone Manor, and the transformation of the medieval Eltham Palace, into an Art Deco mansion.

John Seely served in the Auxiliary Air Force and at the Ministry of Works during World War II. He succeeded to the Mottistone barony in 1947. After WWII Seely & Paget designed new churches including St Andrew and St George Stevenage, the largest parish church built in England since 1945, and restored many buildings after war damage including Lambeth Palace and Eton College, and many London churches.

In 1947 John Seely was Surveyor of the Fabric of St Paul's Cathedral and designed the Chapel of the Order of the British Empire, at the eastern end of the crypt. He was also appointed architect to St George's Chapel, Windsor Castle and Lay Canon and architect at Portsmouth Cathedral. He was awarded OBE in the 1961 New Year Honours. The National Portrait Gallery, London holds six portraits of him in its collection, by photographers Walter Stoneman and Elliott & Fry.

He died without issue on 18 January 1963 and was accordingly succeeded by his brother, Arthur Patrick William Seely, 3rd Baron Mottistone. He is buried in St Catherine's chapel garden at Westminster Abbey. In a niche in the wall of one of the houses in the Little Cloister, which Lord Mottistone restored, there is a statue of St Catherine by Edwin Russell that is a memorial to him. The inscription reads "John Mottistone. This is a sign of love and sadness. P.E.P. 1966 A.C.D." P.E.P stands for Paul Edward Paget, Lord Mottistone's partner. A.C.D. is Alan Campbell Don, the Dean of Westminster at the time of Lord Mottistone's death.

Coat of arms of John Seely, 2nd Baron Mottistone

Crest
In front of three ears of wheat banded Or the trunk of a tree fesswise eradicated and sprouting to the dexter Proper.
Escutcheon
Azure three ears of wheat banded Or between two martlets in pale and as many chaplets of roses in fess Argent.
Supporters
On either side a sea horse (hippocampus) Azure gorged with a mural crown and charged on the shoulder with a maple leaf Or.
Motto
In Deo Spero

Peerage of the United Kingdom
Preceded by John Seely	Baron Mottistone; 1947–1963	Succeeded by Patrick Seely
