= Baron Ilkeston =

Title in the Peerage of the United Kingdom

Baron Ilkeston, of Ilkeston in the County of Derby, was a title in the Peerage of the United Kingdom. It was created on 14 July 1910 for the physician and politician Sir Balthazar Foster. The title became extinct on the death of his youngest but only surviving son, the second Baron, on 4 January 1952.

== Barons Ilkeston (1910) ==
- Balthazar Walter Foster, 1st Baron Ilkeston (1840–1913)
- Balthazar Stephen Sargant Foster, 2nd Baron Ilkeston (1867–1952)
