= 1900 Isle of Wight by-election =

UK parliamentary by-election

The 1900 Isle of Wight by-election was held on 23 May 1900 after the resignation of the incumbent Conservative Sir Richard Webster to become Master of the Rolls which meant accepting a peerage. The seat was retained by the Conservative candidate John Seely. The Liberal candidate, Godfrey Baring was the chairman of the Isle of Wight County Council and would become the Liberal MP in 1906.

Seely

Isle of Wight by-election, 1900
Party	Candidate	Votes	%	±%
Conservative	John Seely	6,432	54.5	+2.5
Liberal	Godfrey Baring	5,370	45.5	−2.5
Majority		1,062	9.0	+5.0
Turnout		11,802	81.4	+0.5
Conservative hold		Swing	+2.5	
