= J. E. B. Seely, 1st Baron Mottistone =

British soldier and politician (1868–1947)

Major-General The Right Honourable The Lord Mottistone CB CMG DSO TD PC JP DL
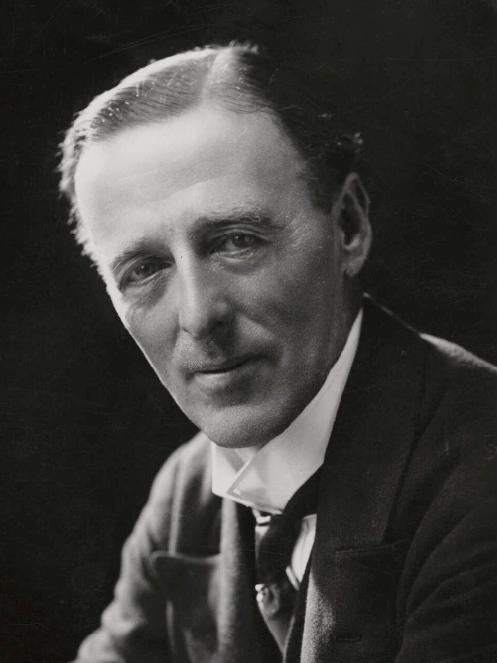

Lord Lieutenant of Hampshire
- In office 24 January 1918 – 7 November 1947
- Monarchs: George V Edward VIII; George VI
- Preceded by: The Marquess of Winchester
- Succeeded by: The Viscount Portal

Secretary of State for War
- In office 12 June 1912 – 30 March 1914
- Monarch: George V
- Prime Minister: H. H. Asquith
- Preceded by: The Viscount Haldane
- Succeeded by: H. H. Asquith

Personal details
- Born: John Edward Bernard Seely; 31 May 1868 Brookhill Hall, Derbyshire, England
- Died: 7 November 1947 (aged 79) Westminster, England
- Party: Conservative; Liberal
- Spouses: Emily Crichton (m. 1895; died 1913) Evelyn Murray (m. 1917)
- Children: 8, including David Seely, 4th Baron Mottistone
- Parent(s): Sir Charles Seely, 1st Baronet; Emily Evans
- Relatives: Brough Scott (grandson); Sophie Hunter (great-great-granddaughter); Bob Seely (great-great nephew)
- Education: Trinity College, Cambridge

Military service
- Allegiance: United Kingdom
- Branch/service: British Army
- Years of service: 1889–1923
- Rank: Major-General
- Unit: Hampshire Yeomanry; Imperial Yeomanry
- Commands: Canadian Cavalry Brigade
- Battles/wars: Second Boer War; First World War
- Awards: Companion of the Order of the Bath; Companion of the Order of St Michael and St George; Distinguished Service Order; Mentioned in Despatches (6); Territorial Decoration; Commander of the Order of the Crown (Belgium); Commander of the Legion of Honour (France); Croix de guerre (France)

John Edward Bernard Seely, 1st Baron Mottistone, CB, CMG, DSO, TD, PC, JP, DL (31 May 1868 – 7 November 1947), also known as Jack Seely, was a British Army general and politician. He was a Conservative Member of Parliament (MP) from 1900 to 1904 and a Liberal MP from 1904 to 1922 and from 1923 to 1924. He was Secretary of State for War for the two years prior to the First World War, before being forced to resign as a result of the Curragh Incident. He led one of the last great cavalry charges in history at the Battle of Moreuil Wood on his war horse Warrior in March 1918. Seely was a great friend of Winston Churchill and the only former cabinet minister to go to the front in 1914 and still be there four years later.

== Background ==
Seely was born at Brookhill Hall in the village of Pinxton in Derbyshire on 31 May 1868. He was the seventh child, and fourth son, of Sir Charles Seely, 1st Baronet (1833–1915).

Seely was a member of a family of politicians, industrialists and significant landowners. His grandfather Charles Seely (1803–1887) was a noted Radical Member of Parliament and philanthropist and was famous for hosting Giuseppe Garibaldi, the Italian revolutionary hero, in London and the Isle of Wight in 1864. Seely's father as well as his brother Sir Charles Seely, 2nd Baronet, were also MPs, as would later be his nephew Sir Hugh Seely, 3rd Baronet and 1st Baron Sherwood, who became Under-Secretary of State for Air during the Second World War.

The family had homes in Nottinghamshire and the Isle of Wight as well as extensive property in London. He is still associated with the Isle of Wight, where he spent his holidays whilst growing up. His aunt's husband, Colonel Henry Gore-Browne, won the Victoria Cross during the Indian Mutiny. Gore-Browne was manager of the extensive Seely estates on the Isle of Wight.

== Early life ==
He was educated at Harrow School, where he fagged for Stanley Baldwin. He also met Winston Churchill, who became a lifelong friend. He then studied at Trinity College, Cambridge, 1887–90.

Seely served in the Hampshire Yeomanry, in which he was commissioned as a second lieutenant, while still an undergraduate, on 7 December 1889. He was promoted to lieutenant on 23 December 1891 and to captain on 31 May 1892.

He joined the Inner Temple and was called to the Bar in 1897.

== Second Boer War ==
Following the outbreak of the Second Boer War he was commissioned as a captain in the Imperial Yeomanry on 7 February 1900, having succeeded in arranging transport to South Africa for his squadron the same week, with the assistance of his uncle Sir Francis Evans, 1st Baronet, chairman of the Union Castle Line. He is remembered in South Africa as the commander that placed the 11-year-old Japie Greyling (1890–1954) against a wall in front of a firing squad, threatening to have him executed if he did not provide information about the Boer forces in the area. The boy refused to cooperate, and was freed. Several memorials still exist in South Africa today, attesting to the remarkable story.

He served bravely, if a little insubordinately. He was mentioned in despatches and awarded a medal with four clasps, as well as the Distinguished Service Order (DSO) in November 1900.

== Early political career ==
Whilst still on active service in South Africa during the Boer War, Seely was elected Member of Parliament for the Isle of Wight as a Conservative at a by-election in May 1900 and re-elected at the "Khaki" General Election that autumn.

On 10 August 1901, he was promoted to the rank of major in the yeomanry, with the honorary rank of captain in the Army from 10 July. Seely was appointed a deputy lieutenant of the Isle of Wight in 1902.

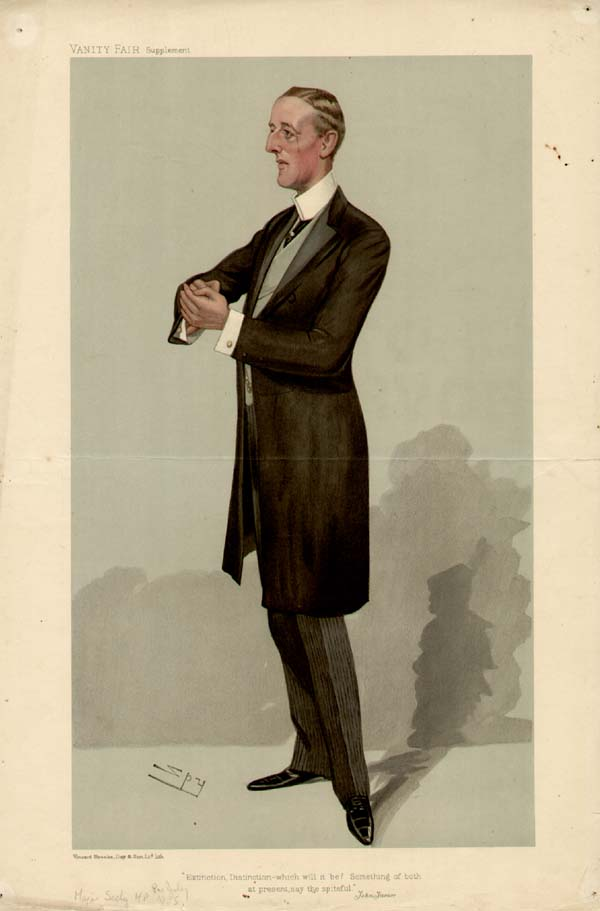
Caricature of Seely by Leslie Ward, 1905

Along with Winston Churchill and Lord Hugh Cecil he attacked the Balfour government's neglect of the Army. He was a strong believer in free trade and was unhappy with the Unionist (Conservative) Party's increasing support for Tariff Reform (protectionism). He also opposed the Balfour government's support for the use of Chinese Slavery in South Africa. He left the Conservative Party in March 1904 mainly over these two issues and challenged the Conservative Party to oppose him running as an Independent Conservative at the 1904 Isle of Wight by-election. They declined and he was returned unopposed.

He was narrowly elected Liberal MP for Liverpool Abercromby at the 1906 general election.

Seely was promoted to the rank of lieutenant-colonel in the Hampshire Yeomanry on 20 June 1907, and to colonel on 31 March 1908; he was therefore known as "Colonel Seely" during his time as a politician before the First World War.

== Under-Secretary of State ==
In 1908, the new Prime Minister H. H. Asquith appointed him Under-Secretary of State for the Colonies, in place of Winston Churchill who had been promoted to the Cabinet. According to the Dictionary of National Biography, "Since his chief, Lord Crewe, was in the Lords, important work fell to the under-secretary, in particular the South Africa Act 1909, which brought about the Union of South Africa." He became a member of the Privy Council in 1909. Seely was also amongst those Liberals who strongly supported Lloyd George's budgets of 1909 and 1910 together with other social reforms carried out by the government such as old-age pensions.

Seely was defeated for Abercromby at the January 1910 general election and returned to Parliament for Ilkeston in Derbyshire at a by-election in March 1910, holding that seat until 1922. In October 1910, he was awarded the Territorial Decoration.

== Secretary of State for War ==
=== Appointment and policies ===
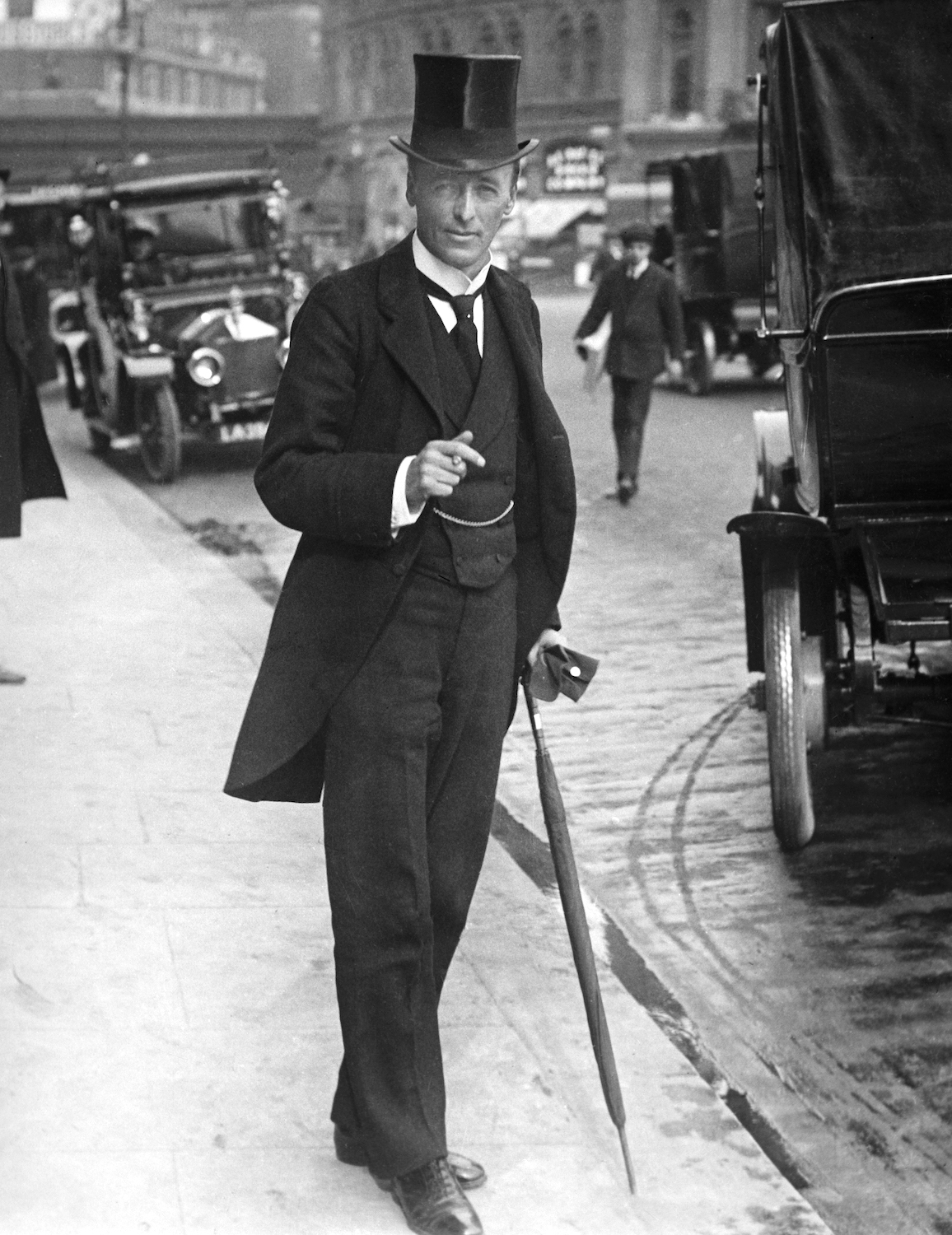
Seely in 1912

Seely then served as Under-Secretary of State for War from 1911 to 1912. As a yeomanry colonel he did not support conscription, which the Director of Military Operations, Brigadier-General Henry Wilson, favoured. "Ye Gods" was how Wilson greeted Seely's appointment in his diary.

Seely was already a member of the Committee of Imperial Defence (CID). In June 1912, apparently on Churchill's suggestion, Seely was promoted to the Cabinet as Secretary of State for War, in succession to Haldane. He held the post until 1914. With Sir John French (Chief of the Imperial General Staff) he was responsible for the invitation to General Foch to attend the Army Manoeuvres of 1912 and was active in preparing the army for war with Germany. Seely supported General Wilson when he gave evidence to the CID in November 1912 that the presence of the British Expeditionary Force on the continent would have a decisive effect in any future war. The mobility of the proposed Expeditionary Force, and in particular the development of a Flying Corps (the origin of the modern Royal Air Force) were his special interests. According to The Times, these developments played a significant role in the victory during World War I.

In April 1913 Seely told the House of Commons that the Territorial Force could see off an invasion by 70,000 men and that the General Staff opposed conscription. Sir John French obtained a partial retraction after Wilson had threatened that he and his two fellow Directors at the War Office would resign in protest at the "lie", but Wilson felt that French's recent promotion to Field Marshal had made him reluctant to clash with Liberal Ministers. During the CID "Invasion Inquiry" (debates of 1913–14 as to whether some British regular divisions should be retained at home to defeat a potential invasion), Seely lobbied in vain for all six divisions to be sent to France in the event of war. French became very friendly with Seely when his first wife died in childbirth in August 1913.

=== Curragh incident ===
With Irish Home Rule due to become law in 1914, and the Cabinet contemplating some kind of military action against the Ulster Volunteers who wanted no part of it, French and Seely summoned Paget (Commander-in-Chief, Ireland) to the War Office for talks, whilst Seely wrote to the Prime Minister (24 October 1913) about the potential use of General Macready, who had experience of peacekeeping in the South Wales coalfields in 1910, and had been consulted by Birrell (Chief Secretary for Ireland) about the use of troops in the 1912 Belfast riots. In October 1913 Seely sent him to report on the police in Belfast and Dublin.

There was more discussion about the Army's stance over Home Rule outside the Army than within it. Seely spoke to the assembled Commanders-in-Chief of the Army's six Regional Commands, to remind them of their responsibility to uphold the civil power. They met at the War Office on 16 December 1913 with French and the Adjutant-General Spencer Ewart present. He assured them that the Army would not be called upon for "some outrageous action, for instance, to massacre a demonstration of Orangemen", but nonetheless officers could not "pick and choose" which lawful orders they would obey, and that any officer who attempted to resign on the issue should instead be dismissed. This did not stop tensions about the Army's role from growing.

By March 1914 intelligence reported that the Ulster Volunteers, now 100,000 strong, might be about to seize the ammunition at Carrickfergus Castle, and political negotiations were deadlocked as the Ulster Protestant leader Edward Carson was demanding that Ulster have a complete, not just temporary, opt-out from Home Rule. Seely was on the five-man Cabinet Committee on Ireland (along with Crewe, Simon, Birrell and Churchill (First Lord of the Admiralty)). General Paget, who was reluctant to move in case it exacerbated the crisis, was summoned to London. On 14 March 1914 the Committee warned Paget of the perceived need to occupy the arms depots to prevent the Ulster Volunteers from doing so. Seely repeatedly assured French of the accuracy of intelligence that Ulster Volunteers might march on Dublin. No trace of Seely's intelligence survives. It has been suggested, e.g. by Sir James Fergusson, that the move to deploy troops may have been a "plot" by Churchill and Seely to goad Ulster into a rebellion which could then be put down, although this view is not universally held. Carson departed London for Ulster on 19 March, amidst talk that he was to form a provisional government.

No written orders had been issued to Paget. It had been agreed that officers domiciled in Ulster would be allowed to "disappear" for the duration of the crisis, with no blot on their career records, but that other officers who objected were to be dismissed rather than being permitted to resign. Although the ODNB concurs that Seely was foolish in effectively giving any officers discretion over which orders to obey, he was keen to keep Paget on the government's side and maintain the unity of the Army. The move to deploy troops resulted in the Curragh incident of 20 March, in which Hubert Gough and many other officers threatened to resign. The elderly Field-Marshal Roberts, whom Seely had told the King was "at the bottom" of the matter, thought Seely "drunk with power".

=== The peccant paragraphs ===
On the morning of Monday 23 March, Seely had a meeting with Gough, with Paget, French and Spencer Ewart in attendance. Seely, who – by Gough's account – attempted unsuccessfully to browbeat him by staring at him, accepted French's suggestion that a written document from the Army Council might help to convince Gough's officers. Seely took over a draft document to a Cabinet meeting for approval. Seely had to leave the meeting for an audience with the King, and in his absence the Cabinet agreed a text, stating that the Army Council were satisfied that the incident had been a misunderstanding, and that it was "the duty of all soldiers to obey lawful commands".

Seely, assisted by Viscount Morley, later added two paragraphs, stating that the Crown had the right to use force in Ireland or elsewhere, but had no intention of doing so "to crush political opposition to the policy or principles of the Home Rule Bill". This was initialled by Seely, French and Ewart and then given to Gough. It is unclear whether this – amending a Cabinet document without Cabinet approval – was an honest blunder on Seely's part or whether he was encouraged to do so and then made a scapegoat.

Gough, on the advice of Major-General Henry Wilson, then insisted on adding another paragraph clarifying that the Army would not be used to enforce Home Rule on Ulster, with which French concurred in writing. Seely had not been consulted about this second assurance.

Asquith publicly repudiated the "peccant paragraphs" (25 March). Talk of a government "plot" was now widespread amongst the Opposition. Seely accepted the blame in the House of Commons on 25 March and offered to resign to protect French and Ewart; Asquith initially refused to accept his resignation, despite writing to Venetia Stanley that he blamed the crisis on "Paget's tactless blundering" and "Seely's clumsy phrases". The Conservative MP WAS Hewins wrote in his diary that "Winston is a criminal lunatic and Seely a fool" (26 March 1914). By 30 March it was clear that Asquith, to his regret, would now have to insist that Seely resign, along with French and Ewart. Seely remained a member of the CID, and it is unclear whether or when he might have been restored to the Cabinet had war not soon broken out.

== First World War ==
Following the outbreak of war in August 1914, Seely was recalled to active duty as a special-service officer. Seely served for near the entirety of the First World War, with few breaks, leaving London on 11 August 1914 to take up a post on Sir John French's staff. On a liaison mission between the French Fifth Army and Haig's I Corps (31 August 1914 – during the period when Sir John French's retreat had opened up a gap in the Allied line), he claimed to have been almost captured in the fog, but to have bluffed his way past a German cavalry patrol by calling out (in German) that he was a member of the Great General Staff.

In October 1914, Seely was dispatched to Belgium to participate in the Siege of Antwerp. Initially acting as an observer, Seely temporarily joined the staff of Archibald Paris, the commander of the British Royal Naval Division, which had been deployed to the city under orders from First Lord Winston Churchill. Seely's Orderly Officer in the Siege of Antwerp was Archibald Alexander Gordon, alias Major Gordon, who with him surveyed the British and Belgian frontlines. When the situation became critical, Seely contacted Lord Kitchener by phone and later received orders for a massive evacuation of the British forces to Ostend. Once it became clear Antwerp was going to capitulate to the Germans, Seely assisted with the evacuation of the Royal Naval Division.

On 28 January 1915, Seely was given command of the Canadian Cavalry Brigade, with the temporary rank of brigadier-general and the substantive rank of colonel. He was mentioned in despatches five times, further enhancing his reputation for bravery. He was known as "the Luckiest Man in the Army" and was the subject of many apocryphal stories, such as that he recommended his soldier servant for a Victoria Cross for having stood never less than twenty yards behind him during an engagement.

On 1 January 1916, he was appointed a Companion of the Order of the Bath (CB). During the advance to the Hindenburg Line in spring 1917, Seely, whose brigade was attached to Fourth Army, commandeered infantry from XV Corps to form an ad hoc combat group to capture Équancourt. General du Cane's anger was assuaged – Seely later claimed – by the arrival of congratulations from Field Marshal Haig. He was appointed a Companion of the Order of St. Michael and St. George (CMG) on 1 January 1918.

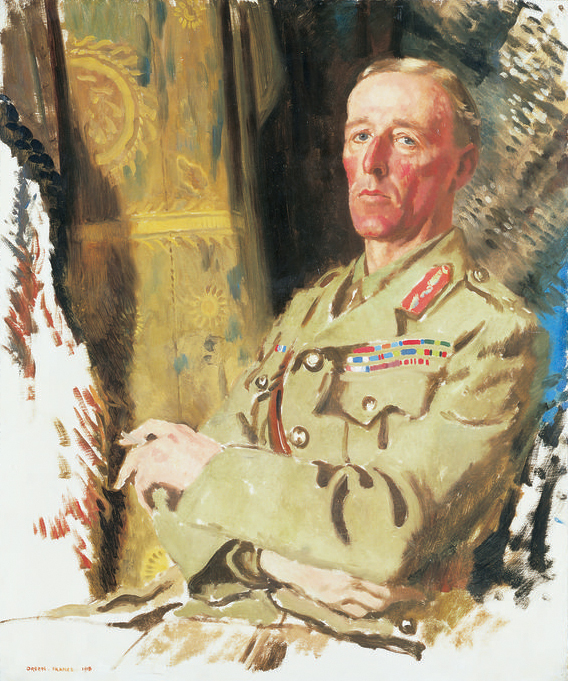
Seely as Brigadier-general (1918)

During the German Spring Offensive Seely, back from London, called on Percy Beddington, a senior staff officer of the Fifth Army, at around 2am on 24 March 1918, to inform him of the gossip in London that Fifth Army had been routed. Beddington, who had only managed to get to sleep an hour previously, for the first time since the morning of 21 March, on a camp bed in his office, recorded that he "lost (his) temper, cursed him up hill and down dale for daring to wake (him) with such drivel." Seely himself later admitted that it suddenly seemed unimportant a few days later when he was commanding the CCB in action, but it mattered a great deal in the next few days when Gough was sacked from command of the Army as a scapegoat.

After being gassed in 1918, he returned to England, and was relieved of command of the brigade on 20 May 1918. He was angry about the move.

Seely had remained an MP throughout his military service in the First World War, and as a member of the Liberal faction which supported Lloyd George's coalition government, he was appointed Parliamentary Secretary to the Ministry of Munitions on 10 July 1918, serving under Churchill (then Minister of Munitions).

He was the only member of the government, besides Churchill, to see active service in the war, and was promoted to the temporary rank of major general on 13 July. Belgium appointed him a Commander of the Order of the Crown, and France both appointed Seely a Commander of the Légion d'honneur and awarded him the Croix de guerre.

== Later career ==
Seely relinquished his temporary rank of major-general on 14 January 1919. He was appointed Under-Secretary of State for Air and President of the Air Council in 1919, again under Winston Churchill (Secretary of State for War). However, he resigned both posts at the end of 1919 after the Government refused to create a Secretary of State for Air (as it later did). In June 1920, he was one of three candidates for the post of Governor-General of Australia presented to the Australian prime minister Billy Hughes, along with Lord Forster and Lord Donoughmore.

In 1920 then-Major-General the Right Honourable J. E. B. Seely, CB, CMG, DSO was appointed Honorary Colonel of the Canadian Militia regiment, the 7th Hussars (Canada). It is unclear if he visited Canada in person to accept the office.

Like many Lloyd George Liberals, Seely lost his seat at Ilkeston at the November 1922 general election. He retired from the army on 25 August 1923, with the honorary rank of major-general, which had been granted to him on 17 December 1919. Seely was also a Colonel of the Territorial Army, an Honorary Colonel of 72nd (Hampshire), an Honorary Air Commander Auxiliary Air Force.

Seely returned to Parliament as a member of the reunited Liberal Party for the Isle of Wight at the December 1923 general election, which saw a hung parliament in which the Liberals supported the first Labour Government under Ramsay MacDonald. In May 1924, however, Churchill (then out of Parliament, and who had recently left the Liberal Party to become an independent "Constitutionalist", prior to rejoining the Conservatives after his return to the Commons in 1924) listed Seely in a letter to Conservative leader Stanley Baldwin as one of his group of Liberal MPs who would vote against the Labour government, and a month later mentioned Seely as a likely Liberal Conservative. Indeed, according to historian Chris Wrigley, Seely's political trajectory was similar to that of Churchill's (i.e. a Conservative in 1900, joining the Liberals a few years later, then becoming a Conservative again in the 1920s). Seely lost his seat again at the 1924 general election, at which the Liberals suffered heavy losses. Seely vehemently opposed the general strike of 1926.

He was made Chairman of the National Savings Committee in 1926, a post he served in until 1943, the same year he became vice-president until his death. During this time he was asked by the Government to conduct the publicity in regard to the conversion of the 5% war loan. According to The Times, "in the Second World War the activities of the National Savings Committee were largely extended and became a vital part of the national war effort." He continued to have an influential role in domestic politics.

Seely was granted the Freedom of the City of Portsmouth in 1927.

== Appeasement ==
On 21 June 1933, Seely was raised to the peerage as Baron Mottistone, of Mottistone in the County of Southampton.

In 1933, Lord Mottistone visited Berlin in his capacity as Chairman of the Air League, as a guest of Joachim von Ribbentrop. In 1935, he visited Nazi Germany again in his boat Mayflower. In May 1935, Adolf Hitler made a well publicised speech in which he proclaimed that German rearmament offered no threat to world peace. That month, Lord Mottistone told the House of Lords that "we ought to assume that it is genuine and sincere...I have had many interviews with Herr Hitler. I think the noble Lord and all the people who have really met this remarkable man will agree with me on one thing, however much we may disagree about other things—that he is absolutely truthful, sincere, and unselfish".

In 1937 Mottistone published Mayflower Seeks the Truth in Germany, which "became a vehicle for Nazi propaganda" according to Mark Pottle in the Oxford Dictionary of National Biography. Plans for a British edition were shelved in 1938 as tensions mounted over Czechoslovakia. As late as June 1939 (after Hitler had broken the Munich Agreement and occupied Prague), Lord Mottistone proclaimed in the House of Lords: "I am an unrepentant believer in...the policy of appeasement". However, in 1941, he wrote an article in The Sunday Times and the Evening Standard denouncing the brutality of "Hitlerism".

=== Other posts ===
Seely was also vice-president of the RNLI. He was a keen sailor and for much of his life was coxswain of the Brook Lifeboat.

Seely served as Lord Lieutenant of Hampshire from 1918 to 1947.

He was also a Justice of the Peace (JP) for Hampshire and the Isle of Wight, the first Chairman of Wembley Stadium, and a director of Thomas Cook.

Lord Mottistone died in Westminster aged 79. His will was valued for probate at £9,212 12s 4d (not including settled land - land tied up in family trusts so that no individual has full control over it - worth £5,500). These equate respectively to around £300,000 and £200,000 at 2016 prices.

== Legacy ==
Seely was a popular figure in the House of Commons. In later life, in a play on his title, his self-promotion earned him the nickname "Lord Modest One". He was described as a brave man, but it was also said unkindly of him that if he had had more brains he would have been half-witted.

The Times called him a "Gallant Figure in War and Politics" and Lord Birkenhead wrote, "In fields of great and critical danger he has constantly over a long period of years displayed a cool valour which everybody in the world who knows the facts freely recognizes." Marshal Ferdinand Foch, Supreme Commander of the Allied Armies in the final year of the First World War, gave him a cigarette case inscribed, Au Ministre de 1912: au Vaillant de la Grande Guerre.

A screen was erected in St. Peter and St. Paul's Church in Mottistone in his memory.

== Marriages and descendants ==
Seely married Emily Florence, daughter of Colonel Sir Henry George Louis Crichton (son of John Crichton, 3rd Earl Erne), on 9 July 1895. They had three sons and four daughters. She died in August 1913.

His eldest son and heir, Second Lieutenant Frank Reginald Seely, was killed in action with the Royal Hampshire Regiment at the Battle of Arras on 13 April 1917.

He married for the second time, to Evelyn Izmé Murray, JP (born 1886, died 11 August 1976) on 31 July 1917. She was the widow of his friend George Crosfield Norris Nicholson and daughter of Montolieu Oliphant-Murray, 1st Viscount Elibank. They had one son (she already had a son from her previous marriage).

Seely's heir John Seely (1899–1963) was an architect whose work, with Paul Edward Paget in the partnership of Seely & Paget, included the interior of Eltham Palace in the Art Deco style, and the post-World War II restoration of a number of bomb-damaged buildings, such as the London Charterhouse and the church of St John Clerkenwell.

Seely's youngest daughter Louisa Mary Sylvia Seely married Charles Montague Fletcher, son of sir Walter Morley Fletcher. Their daughter Susanna Mary Fletcher married Nicholas Lyell.

Seely's son from his second marriage, David Seely, 4th Baron Mottistone (1920–2011), was the last Governor of the Isle of Wight; he was baptised with Winston Churchill and the then Prince of Wales (subsequently Edward VIII and then later the Duke of Windsor) as his godparents.

Seely's grandson Brough Scott, who presented horseracing television programmes, wrote a biography of Seely, Galloper Jack (2003).

Seely was a maternal great-great-grandfather of theatre director Sophie Hunter.

His great-great nephew Bob Seely sat as the Conservative MP for the Isle of Wight between 2017 and 2024.

== In popular culture ==
According to the Sir Alfred Munnings Art Museum (Alfred Munnings was a former president of the Royal Academy of Arts and famous horse painter) "Without doubt his most important painting was that of General J. E. B. Seely (later Lord Mottistone) on his charger Warrior which led to his commission to paint the Earl of Athlone, brother of Queen Mary."

Jack Seely was featured in the HBO film Into the Storm in 2009. At the end of the film Churchill reads a sympathetic post-election note from his old friend Jack Seely: "I feel our world slipping away." Churchill thinks back: "I met him in South Africa, riding across the veldt. He was Col. Seely then. I saw him at the head of a column of British cavalry, riding twenty yards in front, on a black horse. I thought of him as the very symbol of British Imperial power." The Testimony Films 2012 documentary War Horse: The Real Story contained extensive discussion of the First World War service of Seely and his widely revered horse, Warrior. Warrior was adopted as his formation's mascot and had a reputation for bravery under fire. Warrior survived the war, dying in 1941 at the age of 33. In September 2014, the horse was posthumously awarded an honorary PDSA Dickin Medal for bravery.

== Writings ==
- Adventure (1930) - featuring an introduction by Lord Birkenhead, praising his skill as a raconteur.
- Fear and Be Slain: Adventures by land, sea and air (1931)
- Launch! A Life-Boat Book (1932)
- For Ever England (1932)
- My Horse Warrior (1934) – a biography of his charger
- The Paths of Happiness (1938)

Seely's books shed light on his personality but are not always factually reliable.

== Electoral record ==
1900 Isle of Wight by-election
Party	Candidate	Votes	%	±%
Conservative	J. E. B. Seely	6,432	54.5	+2.5
Liberal	Godfrey Baring	5,370	45.5	−2.5
Majority		1,062	9.0	
Turnout			81.4	+0.5
Conservative hold		Swing	+2.5	

General election 1900:Isle of Wight
Party	Candidate	Votes	%	±%
Conservative	J. E. B. Seely	unopposed	n/a	n/a
Conservative hold		Swing	n/a	

1904 Isle of Wight by-election
Party	Candidate	Votes	%	±%
Ind. Conservative	J. E. B. Seely	unopposed	n/a	n/a
Ind. Conservative gain from Conservative		Swing	n/a	

General election, 16 January 1906: Liverpool Abercromby
Party	Candidate	Votes	%	±%
Liberal	J. E. B. Seely	2,933	51.8	N/A
Conservative	William Lawrence	2,734	48.2	N/A
Majority		199	3.6	N/A
Turnout		5667	76.4	N/A
Liberal gain from Conservative		Swing	N/A	

General election, 18 January 1910: Liverpool Abercromby
Party	Candidate	Votes	%	±%
Conservative	Richard Chaloner	3,088	54.7	+6.5
Liberal	J. E. B. Seely	2,562	45.3	−6.5
Majority		526	9.4	+5.8
Turnout		5650	81.6	+5.2
Conservative gain from Liberal		Swing	+6.5	

1910 Ilkeston by-election
Party	Candidate	Votes	%	±%
Liberal	J. E. B. Seely	10,204		
Conservative	Henry FitzHerbert Wright	6,871		
Majority				
Turnout				
Liberal hold		Swing		

General election December 1910: Ilkeston
Party	Candidate	Votes	%	±%
Liberal	J. E. B. Seely	9,990	62.7	+2.9
Conservative	William Marshall Freeman	5,946	37.3	−2.9
Majority		4,044	25.4	+5.8
Turnout			81.9	−5.8
Liberal hold		Swing	+2.9	

1912 Ilkeston by-election
Party	Candidate	Votes	%	±%
Liberal	J. E. B. Seely	9,049	53.6	−9.1
Unionist	William Marshall Freeman	7,838	46.4	+9.1
Majority		1,211	7.2	−18.2
Turnout			81.7	−0.2
Liberal hold		Swing	-9.1	

General election 1918: Ilkeston
Party	Candidate	Votes	%	±%
Liberal	J. E. B. Seely	9,660	54.8	+1.2
Labour	George Oliver	7,962	45.2	n/a
Majority		1,698	9.6	
Turnout			61.0	−19.3
Liberal hold		Swing	n/a	

General election 1922: Ilkeston
Party	Candidate	Votes	%	±%
Labour	George Oliver	9,432	40.0	−5.2
National Liberal	J. E. B. Seely	8,348	35.3	−19.6
Unionist	William Marshall Freeman	5,841	24.7	n/a
Majority		1,084	4.7	14.2
Turnout			76.8	+15.8
Labour gain from Liberal		Swing	+7.1	

General election 6 December 1923: Isle of Wight
Party	Candidate	Votes	%	±%
Liberal	J. E. B. Seely	16,249	46.6	+10.4
Unionist	Peter Macdonald	16,159	46.3	+14.7
Labour	E. Palmer	2,475	7.1	−4.1
Majority		90	0.3	+4.3
Turnout			76.6	+1.2
Liberal hold		Swing	+2.2	

General election 29 October 1924: Isle of Wight
Party	Candidate	Votes	%	±%
Unionist	Peter Macdonald	19,346	52.4	+6.1
Liberal	J. E. B. Seely	13,944	37.8	−8.8
Labour	H. E. Weaver	3,620	9.8	+2.7
Majority		5,402	14.6	14.9
Turnout			80.1	

Coat of arms of J. E. B. Seely, 1st Baron Mottistone
Crest In front of three ears of wheat banded Or the trunk of a tree fesswise eradicated and sprouting to the dexter Proper. Escutcheon Azure three ears of wheat banded Or between two martlets in pale and as many chaplets of roses in fess Argent. Supporters On either side a sea horse (hippocampus) Azure gorged with a mural crown and charged on the shoulder with a maple leaf Or. Motto In Deo Spero

== Sources ==
- Fulford, Roger; Pottle, Mark (2004). "Seely, John Edward Bernard, first Baron Mottistone". In Matthew, Colin (ed.). Oxford Dictionary of National Biography. Vol. 49. Oxford University Press. pp. 674–676. doi:10.1093/ref:odnb/36007. ISBN 978-0198614111.
- Burke's Peerage and Baronetage 107th Edition Volume III
- Dictionary of National Biography, 1941–1950.
- richardlangworth.com
- telegraph.co.uk
- express.co.uk
- warriorwarhorse.com
- Farrar-Hockley, General Sir Anthony (1975). Goughie. London: Granada. ISBN -0246640596.
- Holmes, Richard (2004). The Little Field Marshal: A Life of Sir John French. Weidenfeld & Nicolson. ISBN 0-297-84614-0.
- Jeffery, Keith (2006). Field Marshal Sir Henry Wilson: A Political Soldier. Oxford University Press. ISBN 978-0-19-820358-2.
- Matthew, Colin, ed. (2004). Dictionary of National Biography. Vol. 49. Oxford: Oxford University Press. ISBN 978-0198614111., essay on Seely written by Roger Fulford, revised by Mark Pottle
- Philpott, W. (2009). Bloody Victory: The Sacrifice on the Somme and the Making of the Twentieth Century (1st ed.). London: Little, Brown. ISBN 978-1-4087-0108-9.
- Terraine, John (1960). Mons, the Retreat to Victory. Wordsworth Military Library, London. ISBN 1-84022-240-9.
- Toye, Richard (2008). Lloyd George and Churchill: Rivals for Greatness. London: Pan Macmillan. ISBN 978-0-330-43472-0.

Parliament of the United Kingdom
Preceded by Sir Richard Webster	Member of Parliament for the Isle of Wight; 1900–1906	Succeeded by Godfrey Baring
Preceded by William Lawrence	Member of Parliament for Liverpool Abercromby; 1906–1910	Succeeded by Richard Chaloner
Preceded by Sir Balthazar Foster	Member of Parliament for Ilkeston; 1910–1922	Succeeded by George Oliver
Preceded by Edgar Chatfeild-Clarke	Member of Parliament for the Isle of Wight; 1923–1924	Succeeded by Sir Peter Macdonald
Political offices
Preceded by Winston Churchill	Under-Secretary of State for the Colonies; 1908–1911	Succeeded by The Lord Lucas
Preceded by The Lord Lucas	Under-Secretary of State for War; 1911–1912	Succeeded by Harold Tennant
Preceded by The Viscount Haldane	Secretary of State for War; 1912–1914	Succeeded by H. H. Asquith
Preceded by John Baird as Parliamentary Secretary to the Air Council	Under-Secretary of State for Air; 1919	Succeeded by George Tryon
Preceded by Sir David Henderson as Vice-President of the Air Council in 1918	Under-Secretary of State for Air; 1919	Succeeded by George Tryon
Preceded by The Lord Weir	President of the Air Council; 1919	Succeeded by Winston Churchill as Secretary of State for Air
Honorary titles
Preceded by The Marquess of Winchester	Lord Lieutenant of Hampshire; 1918–1947	Succeeded by The Viscount Portal
Peerage of the United Kingdom
New creation	Baron Mottistone; 1933–1947	Succeeded by John Seely
