= Chaloner =

Chaloner or Challoner is surname and a given name. Notable people with the name include:

== Surname ==
- David Chaloner (1944–2010), English poet
- Frank Challoner (1853–1899), American businessman and politician
- Gary Chaloner (born 1963), Australian comic book artist and writer
- James Chaloner or Challoner (1602–1660), English politician
- John Challoner (c.1520–1581), British politician and administrator
- John Armstrong Chaloner (1862–1935), American writer and activist
- John Seymour Chaloner (1924–2007), British journalist
- Kathryn Chaloner (1954–2014), British-American statistician
- Luke Challoner (1550–1613), Irish academic
- Mark Chaloner (born 1972), English professional squash player
- Paul Chaloner (born 1971), British video game presenter and commentator
- Richard Challoner (1691–1781), English Roman Catholic bishop
- Richard Chaloner, 1st Baron Gisborough (1856–1938), British soldier and politician
- Richard Chaloner, 3rd Baron Gisborough (born 1927), British nobleman
- Robert Chaloner (priest) (1548–1621), English priest, Canon of Windsor
- Robert Chaloner (MP) (1776–1842), English Member of Parliament and Lord Mayor of York
- Robert Challoner (1872–1955), Australian rugby union player
- Thomas Chaloner (disambiguation), several people
- William Chaloner (1650–1699), English confidence trickster
- William Challoner or Chaloner (fl.1709–1734), English slave trader
- William Gilbert Chaloner (1928–2016), British palaeobotanist

== Given name ==
- Chaloner Alabaster (1838–1898), English administrator in China
- Chaloner Arcedeckne (c.1743–1809), English politician and Jamaican landowner
- Chaloner Caffyn (1891–1917), English professional ice hockey goaltender
- Chaloner Chute (died 1659), English lawyer, MP and briefly Speaker of the House of Commons
- Chaloner Chute (died 1666), son of the above, English lawyer and MP
- Chaloner William Chute (1838–1892), English barrister and landowner
- Chaloner Ogle (1681–1750), English naval officer and MP

== See also ==
- Chaloner baronets
- Chaloner (locomotive)
- Chaloner House, historic house in Lubec, Maine
