= Caffyn =

Caffyn is a surname that may refer to:

- Ben Caffyn (1879–1942), American baseball player
- Chaloner Caffyn (1891–1917), English ice hockey player
- Marshall Caffyn (1892–1966), Australian rules footballer
- Matthew Caffyn (1628–1714), British General Baptist preacher and writer
- Nancy Caffyn (1934–2010), American politician
- Paul Caffyn, New Zealand sea kayaker
- William Caffyn (1828–1919), English cricketer
