= Richard Chaloner =

Richard Chaloner is the name of:

- Richard Chaloner, 1st Baron Gisborough (1856–1938), British soldier and politician
- Richard Chaloner, 3rd Baron Gisborough (born 1927), British nobleman
