= Thomas Chaloner =

Thomas Chaloner is the name of:

== People ==
- Sir Thomas Chaloner (statesman) (1521–1565), English statesman and poet
- Thomas Chaloner (naturalist) (fl. 1584), English naturalist
- Sir Thomas Chaloner (courtier) (1559–1615), English governor of the Courtly College, who introduced alum manufacturing to England
- Thomas Chaloner (regicide) (1595–1661), English politician, signatory to Charles I's death warrant
- Thomas Chaloner, 2nd Baron Gisborough (1889–1951), British peer
- Thomas-Chaloner Bisse-Challoner (1788–1872), aka Colonel Challoner, British militia officer and agriculturalist
- Tom Chaloner (1839–1886), English jockey

== Fictional characters ==
- Thomas Chaloner, in historical mystery crime novels by Susanna Gregory

== See also ==
- Chaloner (surname)
