= 1917 Liverpool Abercromby by-election =

UK Parliamentary by-election

The 1917 Liverpool Abercromby by-election was a parliamentary by-election held on 28 June 1917 for the British House of Commons constituency of Liverpool Abercromby. The seat had become vacant when the Conservative Member of Parliament (MP) Richard Chaloner had taken the post of Steward of the Chiltern Hundreds on 18 June 1917, thus effectively resigning from the Commons. Five days later, Chaloner was created Baron Gisborough. He had been MP from Liverpool Abercromby since the January 1910 general election. The Conservative candidate, Lord Stanley held the seat for the party. He remained the constituency's MP until the seat was abolished for the 1918 general election.

Neither the Labour Party nor Liberal Party stood, and the Conservatives' only opponent was the National Federation of Discharged and Demobilized Sailors and Soldiers.

== Result ==
Liverpool Abercromby By-election, 1917
Party	Candidate	Votes	%	±%
Conservative	Edward Stanley	2,224	73.7	+15.6
NFDDSS	F. B. Hughes	794	26.3	New
Majority		1,430	47.4	+31.2
Turnout		3,008	50.1	−25.1
Conservative hold		Swing		
