= Johanna Ropner =

British businesswoman (born 1963)

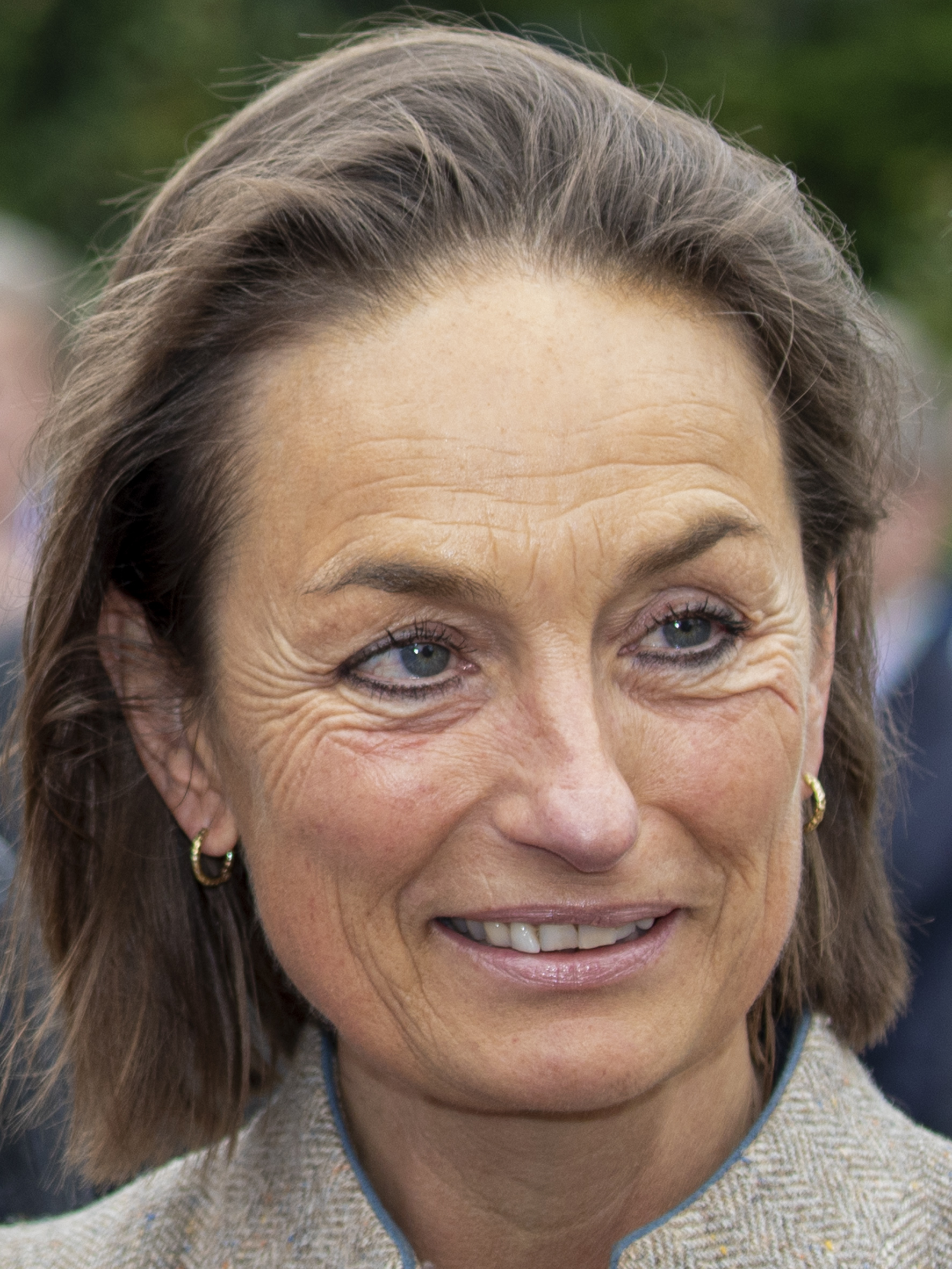

Lord Lieutenant of North Yorkshire
- Incumbent
- Assumed office 6 November 2018
- Monarchs: Elizabeth II; Charles III
- Preceded by: Barry Dodd

Personal details
- Born: 31 January 1963 (age 63) Edinburgh
- Spouse: Robert Ropner

Johanna Ropner (née Stroyan; born 31 January 1963) is a British businesswoman who has been Lord Lieutenant of North Yorkshire since 2018.

== Personal life ==
Ropner, the second of three children, was born on 31 January 1963 to Colin Strathearn Ropner Stroyan and Caroline Jane Brownlow. She attended Newcastle University where she graduated with an honours degree in agriculture.

Ropner lives in Kirklington, North Yorkshire with her husband, Robert Ropner. The couple are third cousins. Together they have three grown-up children.

== Career ==
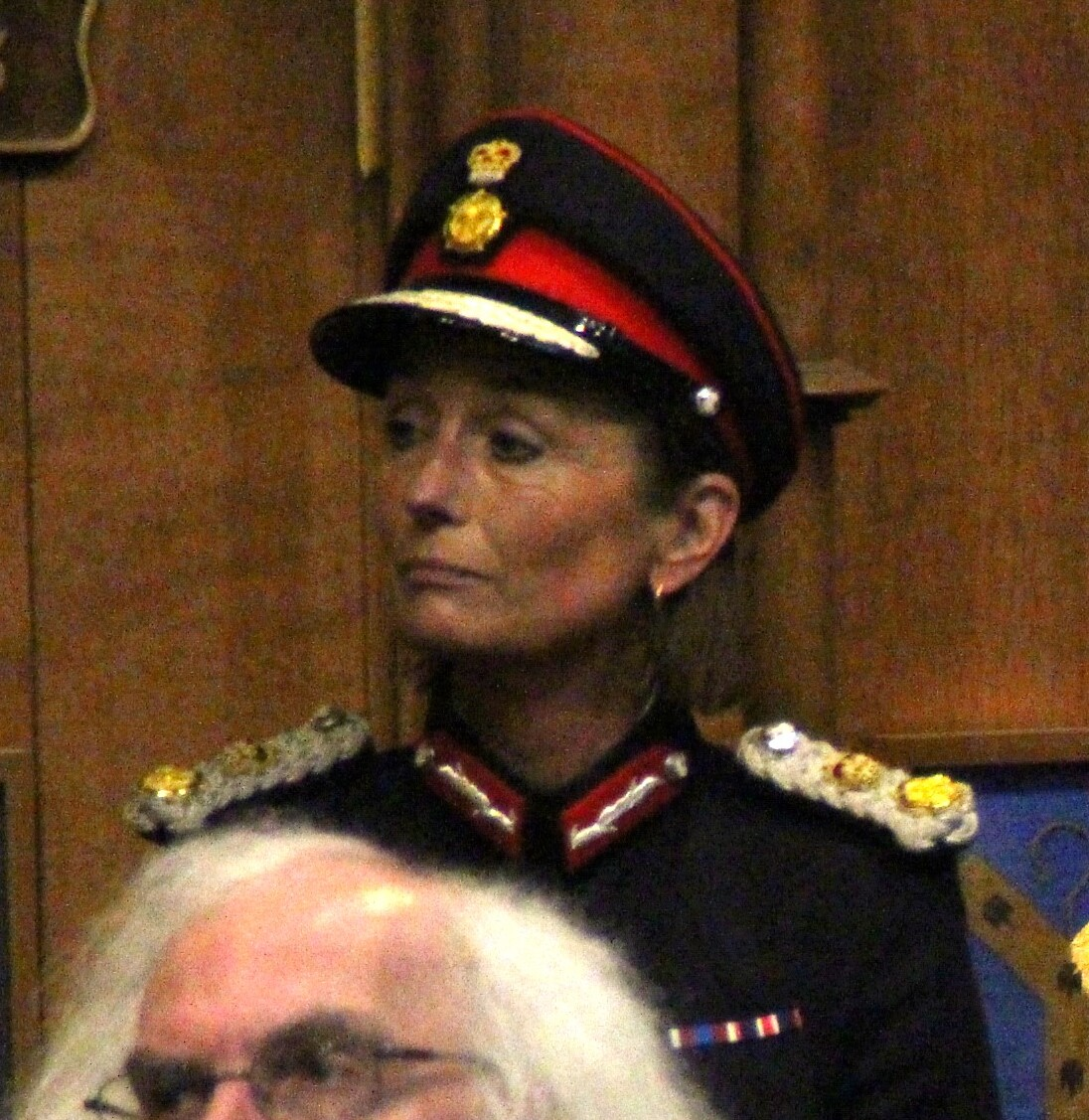
Ropner in uniform as Lord Lieutenant, 2024

Ropner was confirmed as the successor to Barry Dodd in November 2018. The vacancy had arisen after Dodd died in a helicopter crash, and Ropner had previously been a deputy lord-lieutenant of North Yorkshire under Dodd, and his predecessor, Lord Crathorne.

Honorary titles
Preceded by Barry Dodd	Lord Lieutenant of North Yorkshire; 2018–	Succeeded by incumbent
