= Claude Lancaster =

British soldier, politician and businessman (1899–1977)

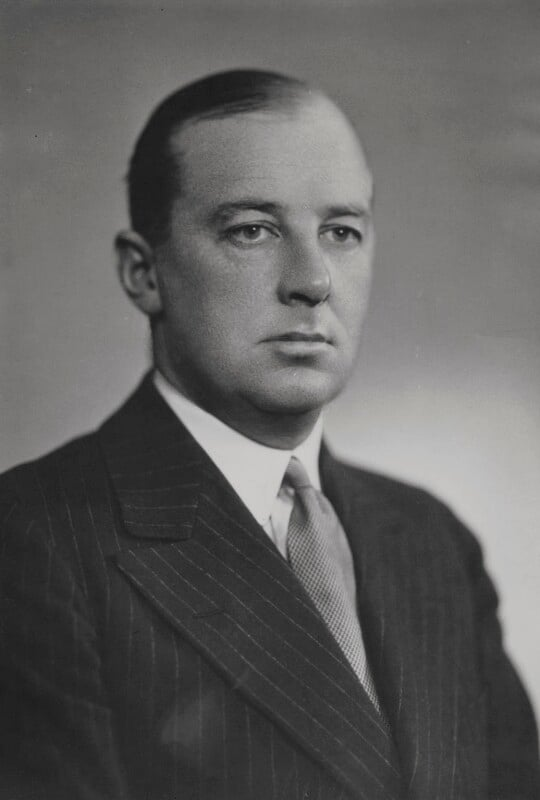
- Lancaster in 1950
- Born: 30 August 1899; London, England
- Died: 25 July 1977 (aged 77); Kettering, Northamptonshire, England
- Military career
- Allegiance: United Kingdom
- Branch: British Army
- Service years: 1918–1931; 1939–1943
- Rank: Colonel
- Service number: 231
- Unit: Royal Horse Guards
- Commands: 9th Battalion, Sherwood Foresters; 112th Regiment Royal Armoured Corps
- Conflicts: First World War; Second World War; Battle of Dunkirk
- Other work: Director, Bestwood Coal & Iron Co 1924–36; Chairman B.A. Collieries 1936–47

Member of Parliament for Fylde South Fylde (1938–50)
- In office 30 November 1938 – 29 May 1970
- Preceded by: Edward Stanley
- Succeeded by: Edward Gardner
- Education: Eton College
- Spouse: Nancy Keene Perkins (m. 1948; div. 1953)

Colonel Claude Granville Lancaster (30 August 1899 – 25 July 1977) was a British Army officer, coal industry director, and Conservative Party politician.

== Family and early life ==
Claude Lancaster was born on 30 August 1899, the son of George Granville Lancaster, who bought Kelmarsh Hall near Market Harborough, Leicestershire, in 1902. Claude Lancaster's grandfather was John Lancaster, a coal owner and MP for Wigan in the 19th century.

Lancaster was educated at Eton College and the Royal Military College, Sandhurst. He passed out of Sandhurst in 1918 and was commissioned into the Royal Horse Guards ('Blues') on 21 August that year, too late to see active service in the First World War. After the war he served with the Blues, attaining the rank of Captain on 20 October 1924. He left the Army in 1931.

In 1924 Captain Lancaster inherited Kelmarsh Hall and the family mining interests, becoming a director of Bestwood Coal & Iron Co Ltd in Nottinghamshire. After he left the Army, Lancaster moved into coal industry management. In 1936 Bestwood merged with two other Nottinghamshire mining companies to form B.A. Collieries Ltd, of which Lancaster became chairman. He also farmed in Northamptonshire and Nottinghamshire. In 1938 Lancaster was elected Conservative Member of Parliament for Fylde in a by-election, and sat in the House of Commons for Fylde and later Fylde South until 1970.

== Second World War ==
Just before the outbreak of the Second World War, Lancaster was appointed as a Reserve officer to command the 9th Battalion the Sherwood Foresters, a duplicate Territorial Army unit being formed at Bulwell near Nottingham. The battalion was assigned to 139th Infantry Brigade of 46th Division, which like several other 'Second Line' Territorial divisions went to join the British Expeditionary Force in France for training and labour duties in April 1940. However, when the Germans attacked and broke through the following month, 46th Division was sent into action in the Battle of Dunkirk. On 29 May 139 Bde joined 'Macforce' holding the canal line near Carvin. As the 'pocket' shrank towards Dunkirk, 46th Division was ordered inside the perimeter on 27 May. On 29 May, 9th Foresters were sent to reinforce the garrison at the fortified town of Bergues, 9 km (5.6 miles) south of Dunkirk. The Germans were unable to enter Bergues until 2 June, and 9th Foresters under Lancaster was one of the last units to leave Dunkirk and be evacuated from France.

9th Foresters left 46th Division in December 1940, and shortly afterwards became the lorried infantry element of 1st Support Group in 1st Armoured Division. However, on 1 November 1941, Lancaster's battalion was converted to the armoured car role as 112th Regiment Royal Armoured Corps. Lieutenant-Colonel Lancaster remained in command during this period before serving for a while in Guards Armoured Division and then returning to the House of Commons, when he was granted the Honorary rank of Colonel in the Royal Armoured Corps.

== Mining and politics ==
Lancaster had maintained his coal industry links while serving in the army: in 1943 he was instrumental in a mission being sent to the United States to prepare for American power loading machinery being introduced into British mines. When the Attlee Government nationalised the British coal industry in 1947, Lancaster 'gave all his support to the National Coal Board ... and did his best to bring what he felt was much-needed drive and decisiveness to its cumbersome and slow-moving organization'. In 1948 he published a pamphlet on the organisation of the National Coal Board and in 1951 in association with former board members Sir Charles Carlow Reid and Sir Eric Young he wrote another pamphlet on Structure and Control of the Coal Industry. He was also a member of the Parliamentary Select Committee on Nationalised Industries and of an inquiry into the activities of the Bank of England, set up in 1969.

== Marriage ==
In 1948 Lancaster married Nancy Keene Perkins (1897–1994), an American interior designer and gardener whose previous (second) husband had been Ronald Tree, MP for Harborough. From 1927 to 1933 Perkins and Tree had leased Kelmarsh Hall from Lancaster, when she had decorated the Great Hall and introduced Chinese wallpaper, still a feature of the house today. Claude and Nancy Lancaster divorced in 1953. She went on to be a leader in the English Country House design style and owner of Colefax & Fowler. When he died in 1977 his obituary in The Times (London) made no mention of her.

== Notes ==
Parliament of the United Kingdom
Preceded by Lord Stanley	Member of Parliament for Fylde; 1938–1950	Constituency divided
New constituency	Member of Parliament for Fylde South; 1950–1970	Succeeded by Edward Gardner
