= 112th Regiment Royal Armoured Corps =

112th Regiment Royal Armoured Corps (Foresters)
- Active: 1941–1944
- Disbanded: 14 October 1944
- Country: United Kingdom
- Branch: British Army
- Type: Armoured car regiment
- Role: Reconnaissance
- Part of: Royal Armoured Corps

Commanders
- Notable commanders: Col Claude Lancaster, MP

The 112th Regiment Royal Armoured Corps (Foresters) (112 RAC) was an armoured car regiment of the British Army's Royal Armoured Corps during the Second World War.

== Origin ==
112th Regiment RAC was formed on 1 November 1941 by the conversion to the armoured car role of the 9th Battalion, Sherwood Foresters (Nottinghamshire and Derbyshire Regiment). This was an infantry battalion raised in 1939 that had seen action at the Battle of Dunkirk, originally as part of 139th Brigade of 46th Infantry Division, and had since been serving in the lorried infantry role in the Support Group of 1st Armoured Division. The battalion had been under orders to accompany 1st Armoured to the Middle East, but these were cancelled and the men returned their tropical uniforms to store.

In common with other infantry battalions transferred to the Royal Armoured Corps, 112's personnel would have continued to wear their Foresters cap badge on the black beret of the Royal Armoured Corps, and the regiment continued to add the parenthesis '(Foresters)' after the RAC title. The first commanding officer was Lieutenant Colonel Claude Lancaster, a Member of Parliament and Reserve officer who had raised 9th Foresters and commanded it at Dunkirk. He was made an Honorary Colonel in the Royal Armoured Corps when his term of command ended.

== Service ==
112 RAC was assigned to the newly formed 42nd Armoured Division as its armoured car regiment. The regiment's initial equipment was the Bison concrete armoured lorry with extemporised armour and Standard Beaverette armoured cars handed over by 42nd Division's Reconnaissance Regiment, with Daimler Dingo scout cars as armoured command vehicles.

112 RAC left 42nd Division in February 1943 and later became a draft-finding unit for other armoured car regiments fighting in the Normandy Campaign. One of the regiment's last duties was to carry out trials on the 95 mm gun version of the Harry Hopkins light tank, even though no-one in the regiment had ever seen a 95 mm gun.

Despite personal appeals from the commanding officer, Lieutenant Colonel A. G. Miller, DSO, to General Sir Miles Christopher Dempsey commanding the British Second Army in North-western Europe, and from Colonel Lancaster to the War Office, to allow the unit to go overseas, 112 RAC ceased to exist on 14 October 1944, when it reverted to the title of 9th Foresters, which was placed in suspended animation. The last entry in the War Diary notes:

The history of this Regiment is a pure example of the complete inefficiency of 'A' Branch at the War Office, in as much as many hundreds of officers and men have wasted valuable years of their lives training for precisely nothing.
