= Barry Dodd =

Former Lord Lieutenant of North Yorkshire, England

Barry John Dodd CBE
- Born: 2 October 1947
- Died: 30 May 2018 (aged 70); Aldborough, North Yorkshire, England
- Known for: Lord Lieutenant of North Yorkshire
- Spouse: Frances

Barry John Dodd CBE (2 October 1947 – 30 May 2018) was an entrepreneur who ran a graphics company, GSM Group. He was appointed as the Lord Lieutenant of North Yorkshire in September 2014. Dodd was killed in a helicopter crash in North Yorkshire in May 2018.

== Life ==
Dodd was born in Salford, but raised in Canada and in Chicago where his mother worked as a court reporter and then in real estate. Dodd returned to England to finish his schooling and to study engineering at Hatfield Polytechnic. Dodd worked as a graduate trainee at the petrochemicals firm ICI where he took on management roles in Teesside, London and New York.

He formed GSM with a colleague from his days at ICI in 1974. The company specialises in labels and barcoding equipment, sheet metal assemblies and automotive components. Through many acquisitions, the company employed over 400 people at nine sites across the United Kingdom by the time of Dodd's death.

He was made an Officer of the Order of the British Empire (OBE) in the Queen's Birthday Honours list of 2006. He was made a Commander of the Order of the British Empire (CBE) in 2014 for services to the United Kingdom economy and was made an Officer of the Order of St John in February 2018.

David Cameron wrote to Dodd in 2014 asking if he would like to be nominated to be Lord Lieutenant of North Yorkshire. Dodd accepted and was elevated to the role in September of the same year taking over from Lord Crathorne.

He also served as chair of the York, North Yorkshire and East Riding local enterprise partnership; as Pro-Chancellor of the University of Hull; and chair of the joint Hull York Medical School.

In November 2018, Dodd was posthumously awarded the Individual Award for Excellence in The Yorkshire Post business awards 2018. The award was collected on his behalf by his widow, Frances.

== Personal life ==
Dodd met his wife, Frances McTigue, at a party in 1970, but they did not marry until 1978. Dodd and his wife, Frances, lived in Carlton-in-Cleveland a village in North Yorkshire where he kept a selection of vintage vehicles.

== Death ==
Dodd died on 30 May 2018, aged 70, when the Bell 206B helicopter he was piloting crashed into a field at Aldborough near to Boroughbridge in North Yorkshire. He had taken off from Husthwaite just a few minutes earlier; Dodd was the only person on board.

An Air Accidents Investigation Branch (AAIB) inquiry concluded that the helicopter had crashed in bad weather, probably due to the pilot becoming disorientated in the cloud. Dodd was taking the helicopter from Husthwaite to an airfield at Walton Wood for an annual service.

Honorary titles
Preceded by James Dugdale, 2nd Baron Crathorne	Lord Lieutenant of North Yorkshire; 2014–2018	Succeeded by Johanna Ropner
