= Edward Stanley, Lord Stanley (died 1938) =

British Conservative politician (1894–1938)

The Right Honourable Lord Stanley MC MP
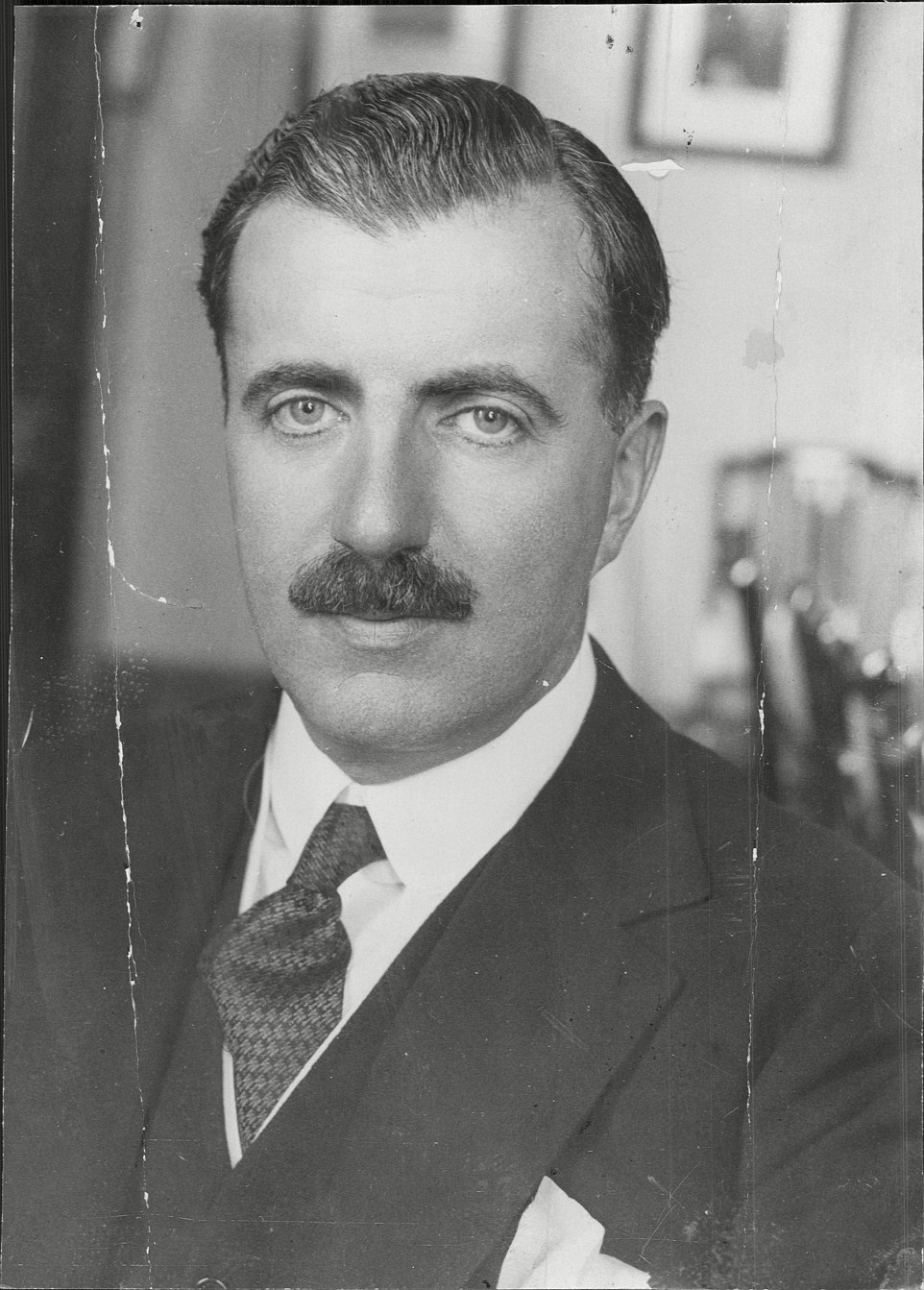
- Stanley in 1932

Secretary of State for Dominion Affairs
- In office 16 May 1938 – 16 October 1938
- Prime Minister: Neville Chamberlain
- Preceded by: Malcolm MacDonald
- Succeeded by: Malcolm MacDonald

Member of Parliament for Fylde
- In office 15 November 1922 – 16 October 1938
- Preceded by: Wilfrid Ashley
- Succeeded by: Claude Lancaster

Member of Parliament for Liverpool Abercromby
- In office 28 June 1917 – 25 November 1918
- Preceded by: Richard Chaloner
- Succeeded by: Constituency abolished

Personal details
- Born: 9 July 1894 Marylebone, London
- Died: 16 October 1938 (aged 44) Marylebone, London
- Party: Conservative
- Spouse: Hon. Sibyl Cadogan (m. 1917)
- Children: 3, including John and Richard
- Parent(s): Edward Stanley, 17th Earl of Derby; Lady Alice Montagu
- Education: Magdalen College, Oxford

Edward Montagu Cavendish Stanley, Lord Stanley, MC (9 July 1894 – 16 October 1938) was a British Conservative politician. The eldest son of the 17th Earl of Derby, he held minor political office before being appointed Secretary of State for Dominion Affairs in 1938, sitting in the cabinet alongside his brother Oliver Stanley. However, Stanley died only five months after this appointment, aged 44; his eldest son, Edward John Stanley, later succeeded to the earldom in his stead.

== Early life and education ==
Stanley was born at 36 Great Cumberland Place, Marylebone, London, the eldest son and heir apparent of Hon. Edward Stanley, later to become 17th Earl of Derby, by Lady Alice Montagu.

Stanley was spectacularly well-connected to leading political families. His father was at the time of Stanley's birth Conservative MP for Westhoughton, Lancashire, and went on to serve as Secretary of State for War from 1916 to 1918 and from 1922 to 1924. His paternal grandfather, the 16th Earl of Derby, was a former Lancashire MP, Colonial Secretary, and Governor General of Canada. His great-uncle, the 15th Earl, twice served as Foreign Secretary and was Prime Minister Lord Salisbury's stepfather, while his best-known ancestor was his great-grandfather, the 14th Earl, who was Leader of the Conservative Party for 22 years (1846–1868; the longest tenure in that office) and Prime Minister three times (1852, 1858–59, and 1866–68). His paternal grandmother, Lady Constance Villiers, was daughter of Lord Clarendon, who himself served on three occasions as Foreign Secretary. Lord Stanley's paternal uncles Sir Arthur and Sir George also served as Conservative MPs.

His maternal grandfather was William Montagu, 7th Duke of Manchester, also a Conservative peer and MP. His maternal grandmother Louisa von Alten married after the death of the Duke of Manchester, Spencer, Duke of Devonshire, also known as Lord Hartington, who for a time (before inheriting his peerage) was Leader of the Liberal Party in the House of Commons.

His sister, Lady Victoria, married firstly Neil Primrose, the son of Liberal Prime Minister Lord Rosebery. After Neil's death in the First World War, she married Conservative politician Malcolm Bullock.

His younger brother was Oliver Stanley, whose son Richard became an MP.

He became known by the courtesy title Lord Stanley in 1908, when his father succeeded in the earldom of Derby. He was educated at Eton and Magdalen College, Oxford.

== Military career ==
Lord Stanley was commissioned a second lieutenant on 2 July 1914. He was promoted to temporary lieutenant in the Grenadier Guards on 15 November 1914, later with seniority from 3 November 1914, and became a substantive lieutenant on 11 November 1914.

On 29 January 1916, he was made a supernumerary temporary captain with the Guards, relinquishing the rank on 12 May 1916. Lord Stanley was appointed adjutant of the newly formed Household Battalion on 9 September 1916, again as a temporary captain. He received a substantive captaincy on 26 September 1916 and served as adjutant until 12 January 1917.

He was appointed a staff captain and seconded on 13 August 1917, and made a brigade major on 22 January 1918, a post he held until 11 March 1918. He served as a general staff officer, 3rd grade, from 6 May 1918 to 8 October 1918. On 9 October 1918, he was again appointed a brigade major, serving in that capacity until 2 November 1919. Lord Stanley was awarded the Military Cross on 3 June 1919, for his service in Italy during the First World War. On 27 November 1920, he retired from the Army and entered the reserve of officers as a captain.

== Political career ==
Lord Stanley was first elected to Parliament on 28 June 1917 in a by-election in Liverpool Abercromby. He left Parliament the following year, when the seat was abolished for the 1918 general election. During this time, he was the Baby of the House. He returned to Parliament in the 1922 general election when he was elected for Fylde. He served under Stanley Baldwin as a Junior Lord of the Treasury from 1924 to 1927 and was a Deputy Chairman of the Conservative Party from 1927 to 1929.

On the formation of the National Government after the 1931, Stanley was made Parliamentary and Financial Secretary to the Admiralty under Ramsay MacDonald. On 26 February 1934, he was admitted to the Privy Council. In 1935 he was made Under-Secretary of State for Dominion Affairs by Baldwin, and later that year was made Parliamentary and Financial Secretary to the Admiralty. Two years later, Lord Stanley became Under-Secretary of State for India and Burma.

On 16 May 1938 he entered the cabinet as Secretary of State for Dominion Affairs. His brother, Oliver, was also in the Cabinet as President of the Board of Trade. However, in October 1938, five months after being appointed to the cabinet, Lord Stanley died in Marylebone, aged 44. Neville Chamberlain paid tribute to him in the House of Commons:

So great, indeed, was his keenness and his interest in Imperial relations that he insisted on carrying out his intention to visit Canada, although even then he was suffering from the disease which has now ended fatally. Perhaps in that office he would have, for the first time, found an opportunity of showing the full extent of his powers, for those who knew him best had long recognised that he possessed to an exceptional degree the high qualities of steady judgment and sterling good sense, combined with a complete and utter selflessness and integrity of purpose.

== Marriage and issue ==
Lord Stanley married the Hon. Sibyl Louise Beatrix Cadogan, daughter of Henry Cadogan, Viscount Chelsea (heir apparent of 5th Earl Cadogan), in 1917. Their wedding at Guards' Chapel, Wellington Barracks, was attended by King George V and Queen Mary, Queen Alexandra, and Mary, Princess Royal. Sibyl was given away by her stepfather, Admiral of the Fleet Sir Hedworth Meux. The Earl of Dalkeith (later Duke of Buccleuch) was best man. They had three sons:

- Hon. (Edward) John (1918–1994), succeeded his grandfather as 18th Earl of Derby
- Hon. Richard Oliver (1920–1983), MP for Fylde North
- Hon. Hugh Henry Stanley (1926–1971), father of Edward Stanley, 19th Earl of Derby

He died in Marylebone in October 1938, aged 44, predeceasing his father by ten years. His eldest son, John, succeeded his grandfather in the earldom in 1948. Lady Stanley died in June 1969, aged 76.

Parliament of the United Kingdom
Preceded by Richard Chaloner	Member of Parliament for Liverpool Abercromby; 1917–1918	Constituency abolished
Preceded by Wilfrid Ashley	Member of Parliament for Fylde; 1922–1938	Succeeded by Claude Lancaster
Preceded by Patrick Whitty	Baby of the House; 1917–1918	Succeeded by Joseph Sweeney
Political offices
Preceded by The Earl Stanhope	Parliamentary and Financial Secretary to the Admiralty; 1931–1935	Succeeded by Sir Victor Warrender, Bt
Preceded by Malcolm MacDonald	Under-Secretary of State for Dominion Affairs; 1935	Succeeded by Douglas Hacking
Preceded by Sir Victor Warrender, Bt	Parliamentary and Financial Secretary to the Admiralty; 1935–1937	Succeeded by Geoffrey Shakespeare
Preceded by Rab Butler	Under-Secretary of State for India and Burma; 1937–1938	Succeeded by Anthony Muirhead
Preceded by Malcolm MacDonald	Secretary of State for Dominion Affairs; 1938	Succeeded by Malcolm MacDonald
Military offices
Preceded by Sir Walter de Frece	Colonel of the 9th Battalion of the Manchester Regiment; 1936–1938	Succeeded by Oliver Stanley
