= Baron Gisborough =

Title in the Peerage of the United Kingdom

Baron Gisborough, of Cleveland in the County of York, is a title in the Peerage of the United Kingdom.

The title was created in 1917 for the Conservative politician Richard Chaloner (1856–1938), who had previously represented Westbury (also known as Wiltshire West) and Abercromby in the House of Commons. Born Richard Long, the son of Richard Penruddocke Long, he had assumed by royal licence the surname of Chaloner in lieu of Long in 1881, as a condition of inheriting the Guisborough estate in North Yorkshire, and Gisborough Hall, from his maternal great-uncle, Admiral Thomas Chaloner. The latter was a descendant through his mother of Robert de Brus, who founded Gisborough Priory in 1119.

Lord Gisborough's eldest son and heir, Richard Godolphin Hume Long Chaloner, was accidentally killed in France in 1917 while guarding German prisoners of war, and is buried at Calais. Lord Gisborough was therefore succeeded by his second son, the second Baron. As of 2011, the title is held by the latter's son, the third Baron, who succeeded in 1951. He notably served as Lord Lieutenant of Cleveland from 1981 to 1996. The title remains strongly linked with the town of Guisborough.

The prominent Conservative politician Walter Long, 1st Viscount Long (1854–1924) was the elder brother of the first Baron.

== Barons Gisborough (1917) ==
- Richard Godolphin Walmesley Chaloner, 1st Baron Gisborough (1856–1938)
- Thomas Weston Peel Long Chaloner, 2nd Baron Gisborough (1889–1951)
- (Thomas) Richard John Long Chaloner, 3rd Baron Gisborough (b. 1927)

The heir apparent is the present holder's son, the Hon. (Thomas) Peregrine Long Chaloner (b. 1961).

== Arms ==
Coat of arms of Baron Gisborough
Crest A demi sea-wolf Or. Escutcheon Sable a chevron between three cherubims Or. Supporters On either side a kneeling angel wings elevated inverted and endorsed each ensigned on the hand with a cross all Or. Motto Frugality Is The Left Hand Of Fortune And Diligence The Right

== See also ==
- Viscount Long
- Chaloner baronets
- Thomas Chaloner (statesman)
- Thomas Chaloner (courtier)
