= William Lawrence (Conservative politician) =

British politician

William Frederic Lawrence

Member of Parliament for Liverpool Abercromby
- In office 1885–1906
- Preceded by: New constituency
- Succeeded by: J. E. B. Seely

Personal details
- Born: 29 December 1844
- Died: 15 January 1935 (aged 90)
- Party: Conservative

William Frederic Lawrence (29 December 1844 – 15 January 1935) was a British politician. He was a Conservative Member of Parliament (MP) from 1885 to 1906.

He was the eldest son of the Rev. Charles Washington Lawrence of Liverpool. He went to Eton College, and received a B.A. from Christ Church, Oxford in 1867 and an M.A. in 1872. He began the study of law at Lincoln's Inn in 1867 and was called to the bar in 1871. He was a Justice of the Peace of Wiltshire.

Lawrence was first elected to Parliament in the 1885 general election for the new constituency of Liverpool Abercromby. He held the seat in the next four general elections. In the 1906 general election, he lost the seat by 199 votes to the Liberal candidate J. E. B. Seely. He died in Salisbury aged 90.

Parliament of the United Kingdom
New constituency	Member of Parliament for Liverpool Abercromby; 1885 – 1906	Succeeded by J. E. B. Seely
