= Baron Crathorne =

Title in the Peerage of the United Kingdom

Baron Crathorne, of Crathorne in the North Riding of the County of York, is a title in the Peerage of the United Kingdom. It was created on 15 July 1959 for the Conservative politician and former Minister of Agriculture and Fisheries, Sir Thomas Dugdale, 1st Baronet. He had already been created a baronet, of Crathorne in the North Riding of the County of York, in 1945. As of 2025 the titles are held by his son, the second Baron, who succeeded in 1977. Lord Crathorne is one of the ninety elected hereditary peers that remain in the House of Lords after the passing of the House of Lords Act 1999, and sits as a Conservative.

The family seat is Crathorne House, near Yarm, North Yorkshire.

== Barons Crathorne (1959) ==
- Thomas Lionel Dugdale, 1st Baron Crathorne (1897–1977)
- Charles James Dugdale, 2nd Baron Crathorne (born 1939)

The heir apparent is the present holder's only son, the Hon. Thomas Arthur John Dugdale (born 1977).

=== Line of succession ===
- Maj. Thomas Lionel Dugdale, 1st Baron Crathorne (1897–1977)
  - Charles James Dugdale, 2nd Baron Crathorne (born 1939)
    - (1) Hon. Thomas Arthur John Dugdale (born 1977)
  - Hon. David John Dugdale (1942–2025)
    - (2) Jonathan William Shaun Dugdale (born 1980)

== Arms ==
Coat of arms of Baron Crathorne
Crest A gryphon's head Ermine wings addorsed Erminois gorged with a collar Azure therefrom pendant a cross moline Gules. Escutcheon Ermine a cross moline Gules between four hurts. Supporters Dexter a crow Sable beaked and membered Or in the beak a sprig of blackthorn flowered Proper; sinister a stag also Sable attired unguled and gorged with a mural crown Gold charged on the shoulder with a thistle slipped and leaved also Proper. Motto Perseverando (By Persevering)
