= Fylde South =

UK Parliament constituency (1950–1983)

Coordinates: 53.781°N 2.923°W

- Former county constituency for the House of Commons
- Fylde South in Lancashire, showing boundaries used from 1974–1983
- County: Lancashire

1950–1983
- Created from: Fylde and Blackpool South
- Replaced by: Fylde, South Ribble and Ribble Valley

Fylde South was a constituency which returned one Member of Parliament (MP) to the House of Commons of the Parliament of the United Kingdom from 1950, until it was abolished for the 1983 general election.

== Boundaries ==
The Borough of Lytham St Annes, the Urban District of Kirkham, the Rural District of Fylde, and part of the Rural District of Preston.

== Members of Parliament ==
Election	Member	Party
1950	Claude Lancaster	Conservative
1970	Sir Edward Gardner	Conservative
1983	constituency abolished: see Fylde	

== Elections ==
=== Elections in the 1950s ===
General election 1950: Fylde South
Party	Candidate	Votes	%	±%
Conservative	Claude Lancaster	33,619	66.75	
Labour	James Brian O'Hara	11,341	22.52	
Liberal	John Edward Gouldbourn	5,402	10.73	
Majority		22,278	44.23	
Turnout		50,362	83.60	
Conservative win (new seat)				

General election 1951: Fylde South
Party	Candidate	Votes	%	±%
Conservative	Claude Lancaster	35,726	74.22	
Labour	Lewis Holden Burgess	12,408	25.78	
Majority		23,318	48.44	
Turnout		48,134	79.95	
Conservative hold		Swing		

General election 1955: Fylde South
Party	Candidate	Votes	%	±%
Conservative	Claude Lancaster	33,204	75.44	
Labour	Reuben Christopher Jelley	10,809	24.56	
Majority		22,395	50.88	
Turnout		44,013	72.60	
Conservative hold		Swing		

General election 1959: Fylde South
Party	Candidate	Votes	%	±%
Conservative	Claude Lancaster	36,988	74.71	
Labour	Norman Holding	12,521	25.29	
Majority		24,467	49.42	
Turnout		49,509	75.81	
Conservative hold		Swing		

=== Elections in the 1960s ===
General election 1964: Fylde South
Party	Candidate	Votes	%	±%
Conservative	Claude Lancaster	31,824	58.20	
Liberal	John D Lees	11,885	21.74	New
Labour	Brian Stevenson	10,971	20.06	
Majority		19,939	36.46	
Turnout		54,680	77.00	
Conservative hold		Swing		

General election 1966: Fylde South
Party	Candidate	Votes	%	±%
Conservative	Claude Lancaster	29,779	54.37	
Labour	David Owen	13,455	24.57	
Liberal	John D Lees	11,532	21.06	
Majority		16,324	29.80	
Turnout		54,766	74.55	
Conservative hold		Swing		

=== Elections in the 1970s ===
General election 1970: Fylde South
Party	Candidate	Votes	%	±%
Conservative	Edward Gardner	39,459	63.62	
Labour	David Mahon	13,354	21.53	
Liberal	Andrew Thomson	9,214	14.85	
Majority		26,105	42.09	
Turnout		62,027	72.72	
Conservative hold		Swing		

General election February 1974: Fylde South
Party	Candidate	Votes	%	±%
Conservative	Edward Gardner	41,028	58.49	
Liberal	Alan Lawson	15,649	22.31	
Labour	Kathleen E. Knight	13,474	19.21	
Majority		25,379	36.18	
Turnout		70,151	77.89	
Conservative hold		Swing		

General election October 1974: Fylde South
Party	Candidate	Votes	%	±%
Conservative	Edward Gardner	37,193	56.83	
Liberal	Alan Lawson	14,527	22.20	
Labour	Terence A. Dillon	13,724	20.97	
Majority		22,666	34.63	
Turnout		65,444	72.03	
Conservative hold		Swing		

General election 1979: Fylde South
Party	Candidate	Votes	%	±%
Conservative	Edward Gardner	45,883	63.4	+6.6
Labour	Graham Chadwick	13,636	18.8	−2.2
Liberal	John Stevens	11,938	16.5	−5.7
National Front	Mike Roberts	941	1.3	New
Majority		32,247	44.6	+10.0
Turnout		72,398	76.75	+4.7
Conservative hold		Swing		
