= Fylde (constituency) =

UK Parliament constituency (since 1983)

- County constituency for the House of Commons
- Interactive map of boundaries since 2024
- Location within North West England
- County: Lancashire
- Electorate: 75,114 (March 2020)
- Major settlements: Kirkham, Wesham, Lytham St Annes, Freckleton, Poulton-le-Fylde

Current constituency
- Created: 1983
- Member of Parliament: Andrew Snowden (Conservative)
- Seats: One
- Created from: Fylde North and Fylde South

1918–1950
- Type of constituency: County constituency
- Created from: Blackpool and Darwen
- Replaced by: Fylde North and Fylde South

Fylde (/faɪld/) is a constituency (Note: A county constituency (for the purposes of election expenses and type of returning officer)) in Lancashire which since 2024 has been represented in the House of Commons of the UK Parliament (Note: As with all constituencies, the constituency elects one Member of Parliament (MP) by the first past the post system of election at least every five years.) by Andrew Snowden, a Conservative. It is the only Conservative seat in Lancashire after the 2024 general election, and one of three seats held by the party in North West England overall.

== Constituency profile ==
The Fylde constituency is located in Lancashire and covers the towns and villages between Blackpool and Preston. It is named after the Fylde, the peninsula and coastal plain on which it lies. Its largest town is Lytham St Annes, which has a population of around 43,000. Lytham St Annes was previously two separate towns, with Lytham being the older of the two and St Annes being a planned seaside resort town developed during the 1870s. Lytham is generally affluent whilst there is some deprivation in St Annes. Other settlements in the constituency include the town of Poulton-le-Fylde, the connected towns of Kirkham and Wesham and the connected villages of Freckleton and Warton. Poulton-le-Fylde is a historic market town, and Warton is the site of Warton Aerodrome and the headquarters of BAE Systems Military Air & Information, where the Eurofighter Typhoon is manufactured. House prices in the constituency are higher than the rest of North West England but lower than the national average.

In general, residents of the constituency are older, more religious and more likely to work in professional occupations compared to the rest of the country. Levels of education and household income are similar to national averages. White people made up 96% of the population at the 2021 census. At the district council level, most of the constituency is represented by Conservatives, with more independents elected in the rural areas in the east. At the county council, the rural east is instead represented by Reform UK. An estimated 57% of voters in Fylde supported leaving the European Union in the 2016 referendum, higher than the nationwide figure of 52%.

== History ==
The Fylde constituency was originally formed for the 1918 general election, but was abolished for the 1950 general election, when it was split into Fylde North and Fylde South. For the 1983 general election those two constituencies were merged to form a new Fylde constituency.

The seat has been won by Conservative Party members during the entirety of its two creations, though Labour came very close to winning the seat for the first time in 2024 on a swing of nearly 18%, but the Conservatives managed to hold on with a narrow three-figure majority.

== Boundaries ==
=== Historic ===
1918–1945: The Urban Districts of Fleetwood, Kirkham, Longridge, Poulton-le-Fylde, Thornton, and Walton-le-Dale, the Rural District of Preston, and part of the Rural District of Fylde.

1945–1950: Part of the County Borough of Preston; the Municipal Borough of Fleetwood; the Urban Districts of Kirkham, Longridge, Poulton-le-Fylde, Thornton Cleveleys, Walton-le-Dale, and part of Fulwood; and, the Rural District of Fylde, and parts of Blackburn, and Preston.

1983–1997: The Borough of Fylde, and the Borough of Preston ward of Preston Rural West.

1997–2010: The Borough of Fylde, the Borough of Preston wards of Ingol and Preston Rural West, and the Borough of Wyre ward of Great Eccleston.

2010–2024: The Borough of Fylde, and the City of Preston ward of Lea.

The seat was reduced in the boundary review leading to the 2010 United Kingdom general election, losing most of its elements from the Borough of Wyre and the City of Preston to the new seat of Wyre and Preston North.

=== Current ===
Further to the 2023 review of Westminster constituencies, which came into effect for the 2024 general election, the constituency is composed of the following (as they existed on 1 December 2020):

- The Borough of Fylde
- The Borough of Wyre wards of: Breck; Hardhorn with High Cross; Tithebarn.

The seat was expanded to bring the electorate within the permitted range by transferring in the three Borough of Wyre wards which constitute the town of Poulton-le-Fylde, transferred from the abolished constituency of Wyre and Preston North. The small part formerly in the City of Preston was transferred to a revised Preston constituency.

The constituency has four main population centres, namely Kirkham/Wesham, Lytham St Annes, Freckleton and Poulton-le-Fylde. Kirkham, Wesham and Freckleton are small towns with some light industrial development and have a considerable Labour vote, but Lytham and St Annes are comfortable seaside resorts, favoured by families and retired couples, and along with the more rural parts of the seat, are safely Conservative, as is the market town of Poulton-le-Fylde.

== Members of Parliament ==
=== MPs 1918–1950 ===
Election	Member	Party
1918	Wilfrid Ashley	Conservative
1922	Edward Stanley	Conservative
1938 by-election	Claude Lancaster	Conservative
1950	constituency split into Fylde North and Fylde South	

=== MPs since 1983 ===
Election	Member	Party
1983	Sir Edward Gardner	Conservative
1987	Michael Jack	Conservative
2010	Mark Menzies	Conservative
2024	Mark Menzies	Independent
2024	Andrew Snowden	Conservative

== Election results ==
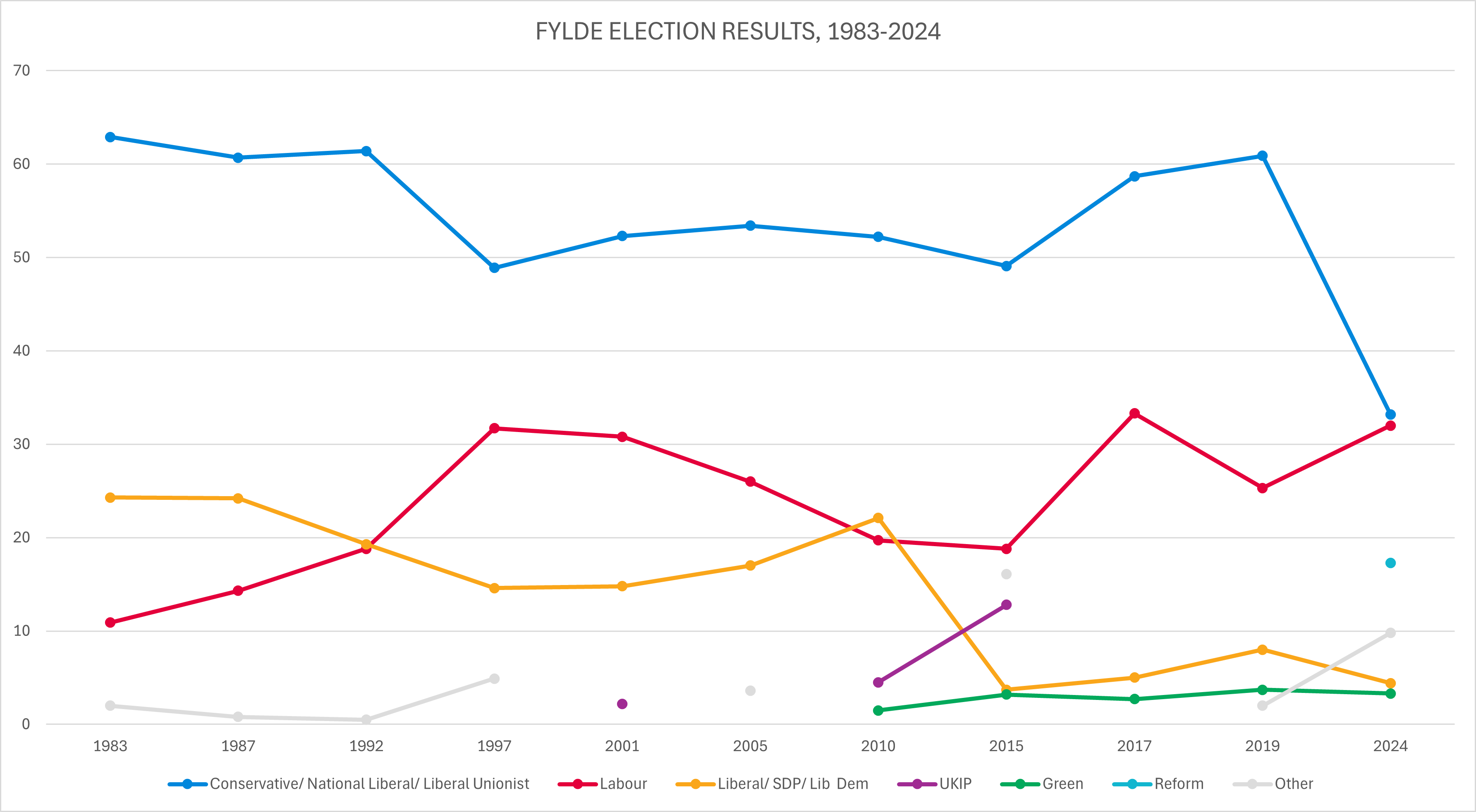
Election results 1983–2024

=== Elections in the 2020s ===
General election 2024: Fylde
Party	Candidate	Votes	%	±%
Conservative	Andrew Snowden	15,917	33.2	−29.0
Labour	Tom Calver	15,356	32.0	+6.8
Reform	Brook Wimbury	8,295	17.3	N/A
Independent	Anne Aitken	4,513	9.4	N/A
Liberal Democrats	Mark Jewell	2,120	4.4	−2.9
Green	Brenden Wilkinson	1,560	3.3	−0.2
ADF	Cheryl Morrison	199	0.4	N/A
Majority		561	1.2	
Turnout		47,960	62.2	–7.0
Conservative hold		Swing	−17.9	

=== Elections in the 2010s ===
General election 2019: Fylde
Party	Candidate	Votes	%	±%
Conservative	Mark Menzies	28,432	60.9	+2.2
Labour	Martin Mitchell	11,821	25.3	−8.0
Liberal Democrats	Mark Jewell	3,748	8.0	+3.0
Green	Gina Dowding	1,731	3.7	+1.0
Independent	Andy Higgins	927	2.0	N/A
Majority		16,611	35.6	+10.2
Turnout		46,659	69.8	−0.9
Conservative hold		Swing	+5.1	

General election 2017: Fylde
Party	Candidate	Votes	%	±%
Conservative	Mark Menzies	27,334	58.7	+9.5
Labour	Jed Sullivan	15,529	33.3	+14.5
Liberal Democrats	Freddie Van Mierlo	2,341	5.0	+1.3
Green	Tina Rothery	1,263	2.7	−0.5
Majority		11,805	25.4	−5.0
Turnout		46,594	70.7	+4.4
Conservative hold		Swing	−2.5	

General election 2015: Fylde
Party	Candidate	Votes	%	±%
Conservative	Mark Menzies	21,406	49.1	−3.1
Labour	Jed Sullivan	8,182	18.8	−0.9
UKIP	Paul White	5,569	12.8	+8.3
Independent	Mike Hill	5,166	11.9	N/A
Liberal Democrats	Freddie van Mierlo	1,623	3.7	−18.4
Green	Bob Dennett	1,381	3.2	+1.7
Northern	Elizabeth Clarkson	230	0.5	N/A
Majority		13,224	30.3	+0.2
Turnout		43,557	66.3	±0.0
Conservative hold		Swing		

General election 2010: Fylde
Party	Candidate	Votes	%	±%
Conservative	Mark Menzies	22,826	52.2	
Liberal Democrats	Bill Winlow	9,641	22.1	
Labour	Liam Robinson	8,624	19.7	
UKIP	Martin Bleeker	1,945	4.5	
Green	Phillip Mitchell	654	1.5	
Majority		13,185	30.1	
Turnout		43,690	66.3	
Conservative hold		Swing		

=== Elections in the 2000s ===
General election 2005: Fylde
Party	Candidate	Votes	%	±%
Conservative	Michael Jack	24,287	53.4	+1.1
Labour	William Parbury	11,828	26.0	−4.8
Liberal Democrats	Bill Winlow	7,748	17.0	+2.2
Liberal	Tim Akeroyd	1,647	3.6	New
Majority		12,459	27.4	+5.9
Turnout		45,510	60.1	−0.8
Conservative hold		Swing	+2.9	

General election 2001: Fylde
Party	Candidate	Votes	%	±%
Conservative	Michael Jack	23,383	52.3	+3.4
Labour	John Stockton	13,773	30.8	−0.8
Liberal Democrats	John Begg	6,599	14.8	+0.2
UKIP	Lesley Brown	982	2.2	New
Majority		9,610	21.5	+4.2
Turnout		44,737	60.9	−12.0
Conservative hold		Swing		

=== Elections in the 1990s ===
General election 1997: Fylde
Party	Candidate	Votes	%	±%
Conservative	Michael Jack	25,443	48.9	
Labour	John Garrett	16,480	31.7	
Liberal Democrats	William L. Greene	7,609	14.6	
Referendum	David J. Britton	2,372	4.6	
Natural Law	Terry B. Kerwin	163	0.3	
Majority		8,963	17.3	
Turnout		52,067	72.9	
Conservative hold		Swing		

General election 1992: Fylde
Party	Candidate	Votes	%	±%
Conservative	Michael Jack	30,639	61.4	+0.7
Liberal Democrats	Nigel Cryer	9,648	19.3	−4.9
Labour	Carol Hughes	9,382	18.8	+4.5
Natural Law	Peter Leadbetter	239	0.5	New
Majority		20,991	42.1	+5.6
Turnout		49,908	78.5	+1.5
Conservative hold		Swing	+2.8	

=== Elections in the 1980s ===
General election 1987: Fylde
Party	Candidate	Votes	%	±%
Conservative	Michael Jack	29,559	60.7	−2.2
Liberal	Elizabeth Smith	11,787	24.2	−0.1
Labour	Geoffrey Smith	6,955	14.3	+3.4
Restore Capital Punishment	Harold Fowler	405	0.8	−1.2
Majority		17,772	36.5	−1.9
Turnout		48,706	77.0	+5.8
Conservative hold		Swing		

General election 1983: Fylde
Party	Candidate	Votes	%	±%
Conservative	Edward Gardner	27,879	62.9	
Liberal	Elizabeth Smith	10,777	24.3	
Labour	David King	4,821	10.9	
Independent	Harold Fowler	863	2.0	
Majority		17,102	38.6	
Turnout		44,340	71.2	
Conservative hold		Swing		

== Elections 1918–1945 ==
=== Elections in the 1940s ===
General election 1945: Fylde
Party	Candidate	Votes	%	±%
Conservative	Claude Lancaster	37,930	61.4	
Labour	Edgar Hewitt	22,102	35.8	
Common Wealth	Karl Edwin Heath	1,784	2.9	
Majority		15,828	25.6	
Turnout		61,816	70.6	
Conservative hold		Swing		

=== Elections in the 1930s ===
1938 Fylde by-election
Party	Candidate	Votes	%	±%
Conservative	Claude Lancaster	38,263	68.4	−2.4
Labour	Mabel Tylecote	17,648	31.6	+2.4
Majority		20,615	36.8	−4.8
Turnout		55,911		
Conservative hold		Swing		

General election 1935: Fylde
Party	Candidate	Votes	%	±%
Conservative	Edward Stanley	39,731	70.8	
Labour	Thomas McNamee	16,379	29.2	
Majority		23,352	41.6	
Turnout		56,110	72.0	
Conservative hold		Swing		

General election 1931: Fylde
Party	Candidate	Votes	%	±%
Conservative	Edward Stanley	Unopposed		
Conservative hold				

=== Elections in the 1920s ===
General election 1929: Fylde
Party	Candidate	Votes	%	±%
Unionist	Edward Stanley	29,894	64.7	
Labour	Joseph Williamson	16,318	35.3	
Majority		13,576	29.4	
Turnout		46,212	74.9	
Registered electors		61,702		
Unionist hold		Swing		

General election 1924: Fylde
Party	Candidate	Votes	%	±%
Unionist	Edward Stanley	Unopposed		
Unionist hold				

General election 1923: Fylde
Party	Candidate	Votes	%	±%
Unionist	Edward Stanley	16,510	55.5	
Liberal	R. Parkinson Tomlinson	13,230	44.5	
Majority		3,280	11.0	
Turnout		29,740	76.1	
Registered electors		39,090		
Unionist hold		Swing		

General election 1922: Fylde
Party	Candidate	Votes	%	±%
Unionist	Edward Stanley	Unopposed		
Unionist hold				

=== Elections in the 1910s ===
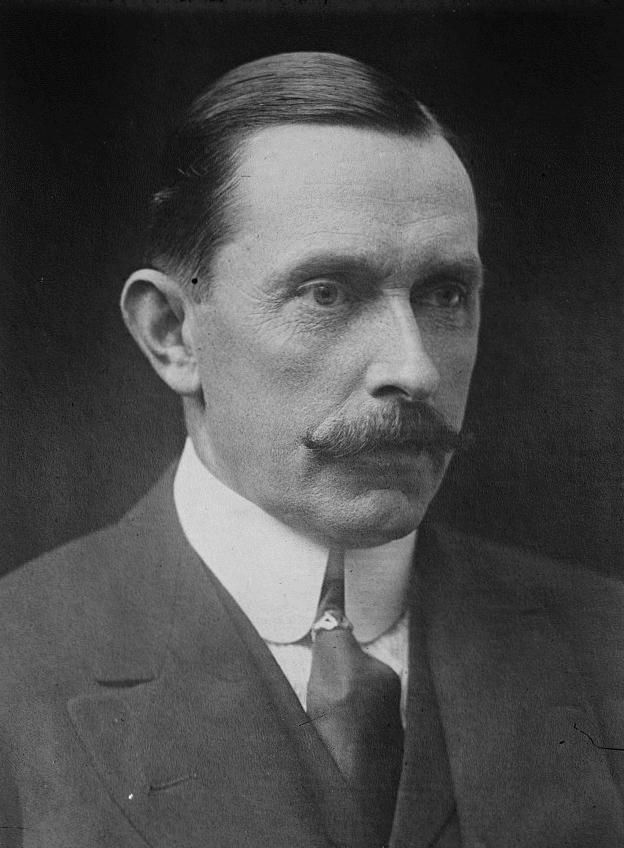
Ashley

General election 1918: Fylde
Party		Candidate	Votes	%	±%
C	Unionist	Wilfrid Ashley	13,670	64.9	
	Labour	William John Tout	7,400	35.1	
Majority			6,270	29.8	
Turnout			21,070	59.0	
	Unionist win (new seat)				
C indicates candidate endorsed by the coalition government.

== See also ==
- List of parliamentary constituencies in Lancashire
