= Lord Lieutenant of North Yorkshire =

Government position in the United Kingdom

The position of Lord Lieutenant of North Yorkshire was created on 1 April 1974.

Since 1996 the position has included the areas south of the River Tees in the former county of Cleveland. Upon the dissolution of Cleveland, Lord Gisborough was made joint lord-lieutenant of North Yorkshire. North Yorkshire is the largest lieutenancy region in England that in 2018 had a population of over 1,135,000.

- 1 April 1974 – 1987: Oswald Phipps, 4th Marquess of Normanby (previously Lord Lieutenant of the North Riding of Yorkshire)
- 1987–1999: Sir Marcus Worsley, 5th Baronet, with a lieutenant:

- 1996–2001: Richard Chaloner, 3rd Baron Gisborough (formerly Lord Lieutenant of Cleveland)

- 1999–2014: James Dugdale, 2nd Baron Crathorne
- 2014–2018: Barry Dodd
- 2018–: Johanna Ropner
