= Michael Jack =

British politician (born 1946)

The Right Honourable Michael Jack CBE
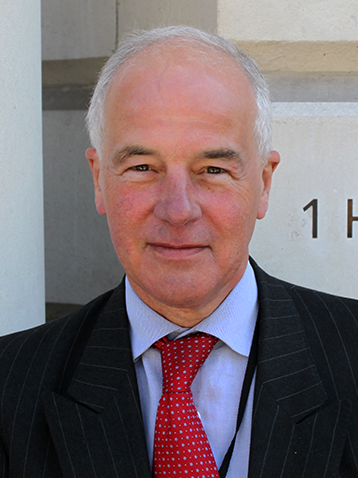
- Official portrait, 2013

Chairman of the Environment, Food and Rural Affairs Select Committee
- In office 12 November 2003 – 6 May 2010
- Preceded by: David Curry
- Succeeded by: Anne McIntosh

Shadow Minister of Agriculture, Fisheries and Food
- In office 2 December 1997 – 12 June 1998
- Leader: William Hague
- Preceded by: David Curry
- Succeeded by: Tim Yeo

Financial Secretary to the Treasury
- In office 5 July 1995 – 2 May 1997
- Prime Minister: John Major
- Preceded by: Sir George Young
- Succeeded by: Dawn Primarolo

Minister of State for Agriculture, Fisheries and Food
- In office 27 May 1993 – 5 July 1995
- Prime Minister: John Major
- Preceded by: David Curry
- Succeeded by: Tony Baldry

Minister of State for Home Affairs
- In office 14 April 1992 – 27 May 1993
- Prime Minister: John Major
- Preceded by: Angela Rumbold
- Succeeded by: David Maclean

Parliamentary Under-Secretary of State for Social Security
- In office 28 November 1990 – 14 April 1992
- Prime Minister: John Major
- Preceded by: Gillian Shephard
- Succeeded by: Alistair Burt

Member of Parliament for Fylde
- In office 11 June 1987 – 12 April 2010
- Preceded by: Edward Gardner
- Succeeded by: Mark Menzies

Personal details
- Born: 17 September 1946 (age 79) Folkestone, England
- Party: Conservative
- Spouse: Alison Jane Musgrave
- Education: University of Leicester

John Michael Jack, CBE (born 17 September 1946) is a Conservative Party politician in the United Kingdom and was Member of Parliament for Fylde between 1987 and 2010, serving at various junior ministerial posts during the John Major administration. He was chair of the Office of Tax Simplification (OTS).

== Early life ==
Michael Jack was born in Folkestone, Kent, England, the son of Ralph and Florence Jack. He attended Bradford Grammar School and then Bradford Institute of Technology (now the University of Bradford). At the University of Leicester, he received a BA in Economics, and a MPhil in Transport Economics. He worked for Procter & Gamble from 1971 to 1975. From 1975 to 1980, he worked at Marks & Spencer, being PA to Managing Director Lord Rayner from 1975 to 1976, National Chairman of the Young Conservatives from 1976 to 1977, Sales Director at LO Jeffs Ltd (a fresh produce supply company and part of Northern Foods) from 1981 to 1987. He has also been a member of the Eastern Area Electricity Consultative Council, and of the Mersey Regional Health Authority.

== Parliamentary career ==
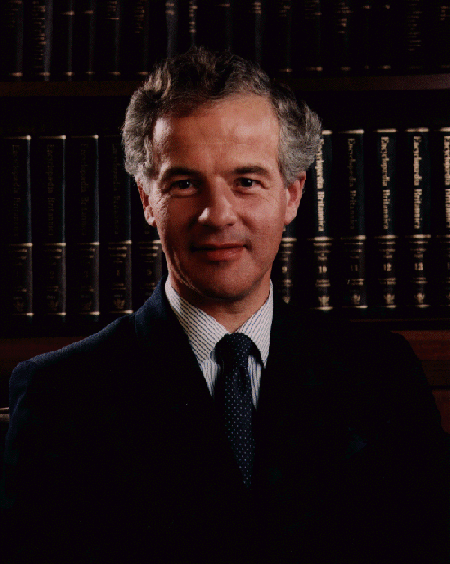
Jack's official portrait as Financial Secretary

He contested Newcastle Central in February 1974. He was a Minister at the DSS from 1990 to 1992, at the Home Office from 1992 to 1993, then at MAFF from 1993 to 1995. From 1995 to 1997, he was Financial Secretary to the Treasury. William Hague appointed him a member of his Shadow Cabinet in 1997 as Shadow Agriculture Minister, but he returned to the back-benches in 1998. He was a member of the Agriculture Select Committee in the 1997-2001 parliament. He was later Chairman of the Environment, Food and Rural Affairs Committee.

Jack was a pro-European, and was member of the Tory Reform Group.

He was appointed to the Privy Council in the 1997 New Year Honours. On 14 March 2008, Jack announced that he would stand down at the 2010 general election. After he left Parliament he served as chairman of the Office of Tax Simplification and he was appointed Commander of the Order of the British Empire (CBE) in the 2015 New Year Honours for services to tax policy.

== Personal life ==
He married Alison Jane Musgrave in 1976, and they have two sons.

He retired as Chairman of Topps Tiles Plc in 2015, having served since 1999.

In 2018, he was appointed Chair of Governors of the Royal Agricultural University.

Parliament of the United Kingdom
Preceded by Edward Gardner	Member of Parliament for Fylde; 1987–2010	Succeeded by Mark Menzies
Political offices
Preceded by George Young	Financial Secretary to the Treasury; 1995–1997	Succeeded by Dawn Primarolo
