= Timothy Kitson =

British Conservative politician (1931–2019)

Sir Timothy Kitson

Member of Parliament for Richmond, North Yorkshire
- In office 8 October 1959 – 13 May 1983
- Preceded by: Thomas Dugdale
- Succeeded by: Leon Brittan

Personal details
- Born: Timothy Peter Geoffrey Kitson; 28 January 1931 Leeds, England
- Died: 18 May 2019 (aged 88) Middleham, North Yorkshire, England
- Party: Conservative
- Spouse: Sally Fattorini (m. 1959)
- Children: 3
- Education: Royal Agricultural College
- Profession: Farmer

Sir Timothy Peter Geoffrey Kitson (28 January 1931 – 18 May 2019) was a British Conservative politician who was Member of Parliament for Richmond, North Yorkshire. He was first elected at the 1959 general election, and stood down at the 1983 general election.

== Background ==
Kitson was born in Leeds, the son of Geoffrey Herbert and Kathleen Kitson (née Paul). His family ran a locomotive manufacturer Kitson and Company which went into receivership during his childhood. He was educated at Charterhouse and the Royal Agricultural College, Cirencester. He farmed in Australia from 1949 to 1951.

In 1959 Kitson married Diana Mary "Sally" Fattorini, whose family owned Grattan, a mail-order company. the couple had two daughters and one son.

== Political career ==
From 1954 to 1957, Kitson served as a councillor on Thirsk Rural District Council, and from 1957 to 1961 on North Riding County Council. In 1959, he was elected to Parliament for Richmond, North Yorkshire, after Thomas Dugdale was elevated to a peerage. He acted as joint honorary secretary of the Conservative parliamentary committee on agriculture, fisheries and food from 1965 to 1966 and a Parliamentary Private Secretary to the then Prime Minister Edward Heath from 1970 to 1974. He showed no interest in promotion to higher office, and kept a relatively low profile.

In 1964 and 1965, Kitson supported the Labour MP Sydney Silverman's successful 'Murder (Abolition of Death Penalty) Bill'. He opposed abolition in the form finalised in 1969, however. Kitson received a knighthood in Heath's resignation honours list in 1974.

Kitson was part of Heath's campaign team in the 1975 Conservative Party leadership election, though when Heath failed to surpass Margaret Thatcher in the first round, it fell upon Kitson to inform him of his loss. Uncomfortable with the direction the party took under Thatcher, Kitson stood down from parliament at the 1983 general election. He was a staunch defender of Heath's legacy for the rest of his life.

== Later life ==
After leaving parliament, Kitson was chairman of the Provident Financial Group from 1983 to 1995, and of the Halifax Building Society from 1995 to 1998.

Kitson lived in Middleham, North Yorkshire, in retirement, where he died on 18 May 2019, aged 88.

Parliament of the United Kingdom
Preceded by Thomas Dugdale	Member of Parliament for Richmond, North Yorkshire; 1959–1983	Succeeded by Leon Brittan
