= Mark Menzies =

British politician (born 1971)

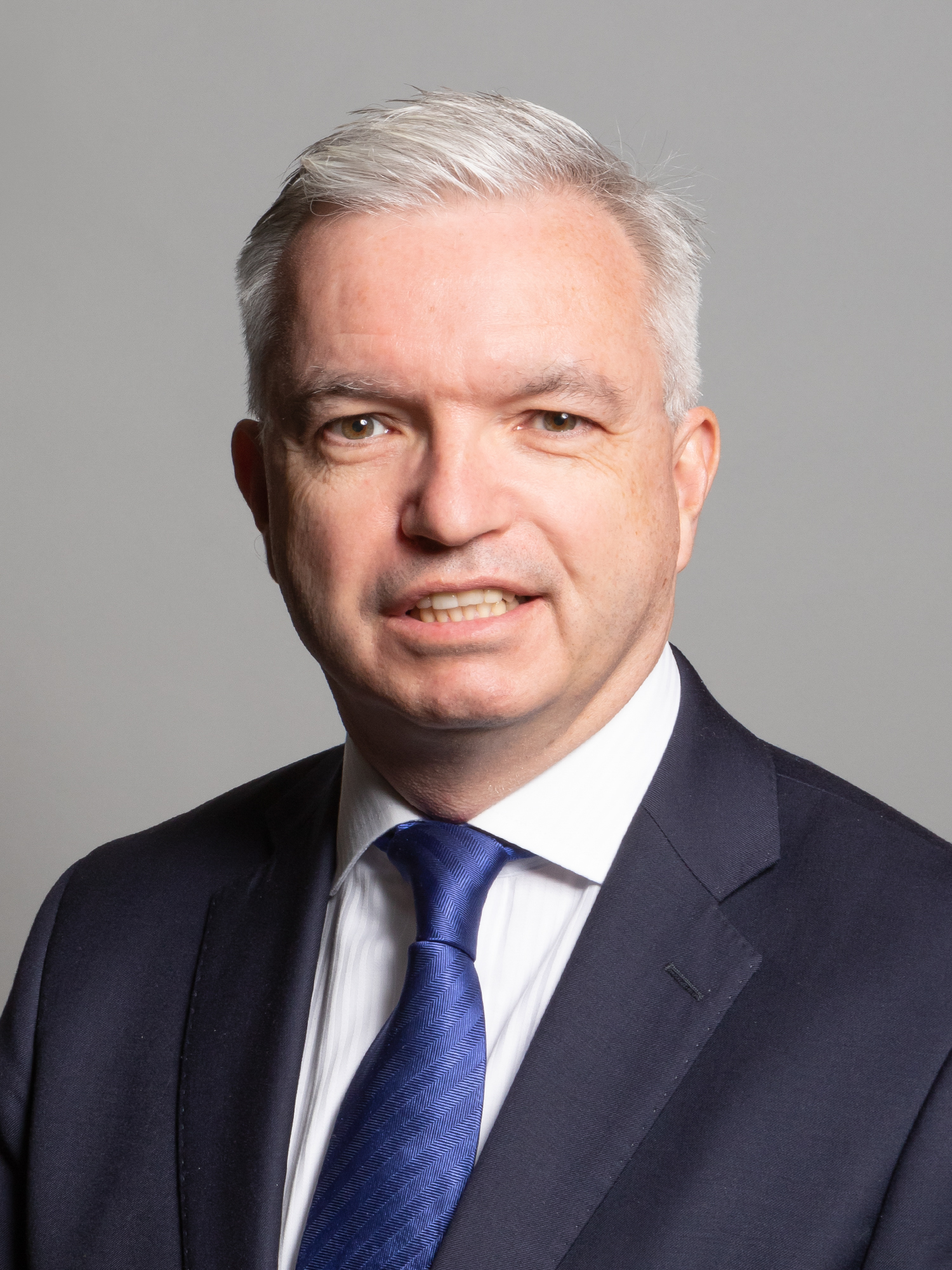
- Official portrait, 2020

Member of Parliament for Fylde
- In office 6 May 2010 – 30 May 2024
- Preceded by: Michael Jack
- Succeeded by: Andrew Snowden

Personal details
- Born: Mark Andrew Menzies; 18 May 1971 (age 55) Irvine, North Ayrshire, Scotland
- Party: Independent (since 2024)
- Other political affiliations: Conservative (until 2024)
- Education: University of Glasgow
- Website: www.markmenzies.org.uk

Mark Andrew Menzies (born 18 May 1971) is a British politician who served as Member of Parliament (MP) for Fylde in Lancashire from 2010 to 2024. As a member of the Conservative Party, he was the parliamentary private secretary (PPS) to Charles Hendry, Minister of State for Energy and Climate Change, before both were removed in the 2012 British cabinet reshuffle.

Menzies resigned as PPS to Alan Duncan, Minister of State for International Development, in March 2014 following allegations in the Sunday Mirror that Menzies had paid a Brazilian male escort for sex and tried to obtain the illegal drug mephedrone. Menzies said a number of the claims were "untrue".

In April 2024 he resigned the Conservative Party whip in Parliament whilst claims of misuse of party funds, reported by The Times, were investigated. Menzies denied the allegations and said he complied with all the rules about funding declarations. On 21 April he resigned from the Conservative Party and announced he would stand down as an MP at the 2024 general election.

== Early life ==
Menzies grew up in Ardrossan, Ayrshire, raised by his mother after his Merchant Navy father died a month before he was born. With his mother working shifts at the local Nobel Division of ICI factory to support them, he attended a local primary school before entering private education, using the Assisted Places Scheme, at an independent secondary school, the Keil School in Dumbarton.

At the University of Glasgow, he was President of the Conservative Association in 1994 and graduated with an honours master's degree in economic and social history. He joined Marks & Spencer as a graduate trainee in 1994, and later worked in marketing for two large UK supermarkets. In 2007, he was the recipient of the IGD/Unilever Social Innovation Marketing award.

Menzies stood as a Conservative candidate for the safe Labour seat of Glasgow Govan in the 2001 general election, where he came fourth. In the 2005 general election, he stood in Selby in Yorkshire, a Labour marginal, and came second, losing by less than 500 votes. He was added to David Cameron's "A-List" in 2006, and Menzies was selected for the safe conservative seat of Fylde in November 2008.

== Parliamentary career ==
Menzies was elected as the MP for Fylde in Lancashire at the 2010 general election, succeeding Michael Jack and retaining the seat for the Conservatives, gaining 22,826 votes (52.2%) and 13,185 majority. After his election in May 2010, Menzies made his maiden speech on 21 June 2010. In November 2010, he was one of only seven newly elected MPs to be chosen as a Parliamentary Private Secretary to a Minister of the Government.

Menzies has been involved in the advocacy of several issues in relation to his Fylde constituency. In the autumn of 2011, he successfully called upon the Government to establish an Enterprise Zone at Warton which he believed would attract international investment and mitigate the compulsory redundancies announced at BAE Systems. Similarly, he has also praised BAE Warton as being a centre of excellence in nine different practice areas and acknowledges the contribution that the company made to the local economy.

In October and November 2011, reports emerged of dangerous cockling practices in the Ribble Estuary. Menzies raised Governmental awareness of this issue and called for urgent action to avoid a repeat of the 2004 Morecambe Bay cockling disaster. He succeeded in implementing a temporary ban pending further emergency by-laws.

Menzies was the parliamentary private secretary (PPS) to Charles Hendry, Minister of State for Energy and Climate Change, before both were removed in the 2012 British cabinet reshuffle.

He campaigned for the liberalisation of Sunday Trading legislation. He brought forward a Bill which sought to allow local authorities to vary Sunday trading restrictions in their jurisdiction contemporaneously to large national events. More specifically, he argued that the retail sector should be able to take advantage of any extra revenues generated by the Olympics in London 2012. In line with Menzies' interest in defence, he is a member of the Armed Forces Parliamentary Scheme. Menzies was a member of the Scottish Affairs Select Committee for a time in 2010 before his appointment as a Parliamentary Private Secretary. His website states that his main political priorities include "UK energy security, changing the planning system to empower local communities and limit inappropriate development and ensuring a vibrant future for the defence industry within the UK".

Menzies was opposed to Brexit prior to the 2016 EU membership referendum.

In August 2019 he called for an end to fracking for shale gas in the Fylde, following an earth tremor measuring 2.9MI on the Richter Scale. He said: "Throughout my time as the Member of Parliament for Fylde I have called for stringent and robust regulation of the shale gas industry to ensure the safety of local residents... It is now clear that hydraulic fracturing is not suitable for Fylde or the people of Fylde and I will be writing to Ministers and the Oil and Gas Authority to call for full cessation of the shale gas industry operating on the Fylde Coast."

Menzies was reelected in the December 2019 general election. In the October 2022 Conservative Party leadership election, Menzies supported Rishi Sunak.

=== 2014 allegations in the Sunday Mirror ===
In March 2014, Menzies resigned as Parliamentary Private Secretary to Alan Duncan, then the International Development Minister, after a report in the Sunday Mirror that Menzies had paid a Brazilian male escort for sex and asked him to supply mephedrone, a Class B drug banned in Britain in 2010. Menzies said a number of the claims were "untrue".

=== 2017 police investigation ===
In 2017 it was reported that Menzies had been questioned by police over allegations he fed alcohol to a dog and had a brawl with a friend. A spokesman for Thames Valley Police said: "Thames Valley police officers responded to a report of an incident in Langford, Oxfordshire, on 6 August 2015." The dog had emergency veterinary treatment for "intoxication" and "poisoning". Menzies was not charged and strongly denied any wrongdoing. Menzies said his friend had attacked him and stated that the police had dropped their investigation after he showed them pictures of his friend plying the dog with alcoholic drinks.

=== Alleged misuse of campaign funds ===
In April 2024, Menzies was reported as being under investigation by the Conservative Party for the alleged misuse of campaign funds; he resigned the Conservative Party whip on 17 April 2024 whilst allegations were investigated. In a statement to The Times, Menzies said: "I strongly dispute the allegations put to me. I have fully complied with all the rules for declarations."

According to The Times, £14,000 given by donors for use on campaign activities was transferred to Menzies' personal bank accounts and used for private medical expenses. A further £6,500 was paid by his office manager to people Menzies met on an online dating site who, he said, had locked him in a London flat, with campaign funds being used to reimburse her. According to the BBC, some of the money was used to pay sex workers.

Labour Party chairwoman Anneliese Dodds wrote to Lancashire Constabulary urging an investigation into the potential misuse. The police released a statement on 18 April stating: "We are aware of reports in the media relating to a serving member of parliament. No complaint has been made to the police at this stage. We will make contact with those impacted in due course to see whether they wish to make a complaint." It was understood that this would involve contacting Menzies. Dodds also asked whether Conservative Campaign Headquarters had advised those involved to contact the police and whether the party itself had reported the matter. Following Labour's demand for a probe into potential fraud, the police opened an investigation.

On 21 April 2024, Menzies said in a statement that he would not stand for re-election as an MP "due to the pressures on myself and my elderly mother", continuing "This has been a very difficult week for me and I request that my family's privacy is respected." Following an internal investigation, the Conservative Party said it could not conclude there had been any misuse of party funds, but said that Menzies had shown a "pattern of behaviour that falls below the standards expected of MPs".

In September 2025, the police dropped the investigation, saying there "no evidence that any criminal offences have taken place" and the former-MP had agreed to repay the money, although it was not clear how much. The Conservative Party gave Menzies a five-figure hardship loan.

Parliament of the United Kingdom
Preceded by Michael Jack	Member of Parliament for Fylde; 2010–2024	Succeeded by Andrew Snowden
