= Liverpool Abercromby =

Parliamentary constituency in the United Kingdom, 1885–1918

- Former borough constituency for the House of Commons
- County: Lancashire

1885–1918
- Seats: One
- Created from: Liverpool
- Replaced by: Liverpool Exchange

Liverpool Abercromby or Abercromby (Liverpool) was a constituency represented in the House of Commons of the Parliament of the United Kingdom. It was created by the Redistribution of Seats Act 1885 for the 1885 general election and returned one Member of Parliament (MP) by the first past the post system until it was abolished at the 1918 general election.

== Boundaries ==
The Municipal Borough of Liverpool wards of Abercromby, Castle Street, Great George's, Pitt Street, Rodney Street, and St Peter's.

== Members of Parliament ==
Election	Member	Party
1885	William Lawrence	Conservative
1906	J. E. B. Seely	Liberal
1910 Jan.	Richard Chaloner	Conservative
1917 b-e	Edward Stanley	Unionist
1918	Constituency abolished	

== Elections ==
=== Elections in the 1880s ===
Samuel Smith

General election, 25 November 1885: Liverpool Abercromby
Party	Candidate	Votes	%	±%
Conservative	William Lawrence	3,789	56.0	
Liberal	Samuel Smith	2,982	44.0	
Majority		807	12.0	
Turnout		6,771	74.1	
Registered electors		9,137		
Conservative win (new seat)				

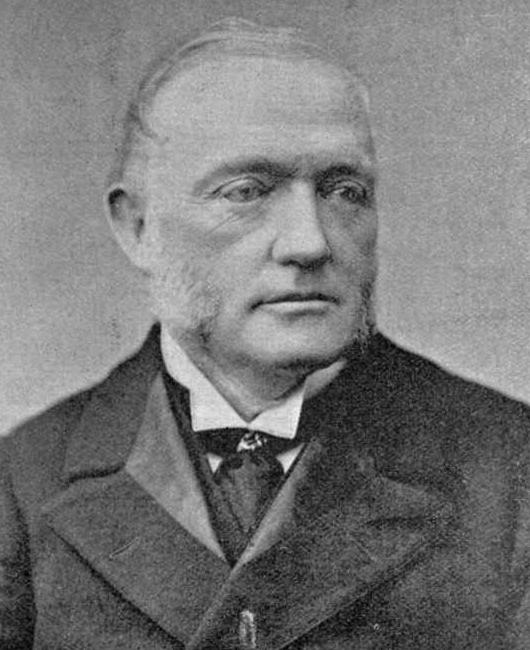
Thomas Brassey

General election, July 1886: Liverpool Abercromby
Party	Candidate	Votes	%	±%
Conservative	William Lawrence	3,583	55.7	−0.3
Liberal	Thomas Brassey	2,844	44.3	+0.3
Majority		739	11.4	−0.6
Turnout		6,427	70.3	−3.8
Registered electors		9,137		
Conservative hold		Swing	−0.3	

=== Elections in the 1890s ===
W. Lawrence

General election, July 1892: Liverpool Abercromby
Party	Candidate	Votes	%	±%
Conservative	William Lawrence	3,677	56.4	+0.7
Liberal	William Bowring	2,846	43.6	−0.7
Majority		831	12.8	+1.4
Turnout		6,523	72.0	+1.7
Registered electors		9,054		
Conservative hold		Swing	+0.7	

General election, July/August 1895: Liverpool Abercromby
Party	Candidate	Votes	%	±%
Conservative	William Lawrence	Unopposed		
Conservative hold				

=== Elections in the 1900s ===
General election, September/October 1900: Liverpool Abercromby
Party	Candidate	Votes	%	±%
Conservative	William Lawrence	Unopposed		
Conservative hold				

Seely

General election, 16 January 1906: Liverpool Abercromby
Party	Candidate	Votes	%	±%
Liberal	J. E. B. Seely	2,933	51.8	New
Conservative	William Lawrence	2,734	48.2	N/A
Majority		199	3.6	N/A
Turnout		5,667	76.4	N/A
Registered electors		7,418		
Liberal gain from Conservative		Swing	N/A	

=== Elections in the 1910s ===
Richard Chaloner

General election, 18 January 1910: Liverpool Abercromby
Party	Candidate	Votes	%	±%
Conservative	Richard Chaloner	3,088	54.7	+6.5
Liberal	J. E. B. Seely	2,562	45.3	−6.5
Majority		526	9.4	+5.8
Turnout		5,650	81.6	+5.2
Conservative gain from Liberal		Swing	+6.5	

General election, December 1910: Liverpool Abercromby
Party	Candidate	Votes	%	±%
Conservative	Richard Chaloner	3,024	58.1	+3.4
Liberal	Frederick Bowring	2,184	41.9	−3.4
Majority		840	16.2	+6.8
Turnout		5,208	75.2	−6.4
Conservative hold		Swing	+3.4	

1917 Liverpool Abercromby by-election
Party	Candidate	Votes	%	±%
Unionist	Edward Stanley	2,224	73.7	+15.6
NFDSS	Frank Buckley Hughes	794	26.3	New
Majority		1,430	47.4	+31.2
Turnout		3,008	50.1	−25.1
Unionist hold		Swing		
