= Edward Gardner (British politician) =

Edward Gardner QC MP
- Gardner in 1962

Member of Parliament for Fylde Fylde South (1970–1983)
- In office 18 June 1970 – 18 May 1987
- Preceded by: Claude Lancaster
- Succeeded by: Michael Jack

Member of Parliament for Billericay
- In office 8 October 1959 – 10 March 1966
- Preceded by: Richard Body
- Succeeded by: Eric Moonman

Personal details
- Born: 10 May 1912 Preston, Lancashire, England
- Died: 2 August 2001 (aged 89) Bishop's Stortford, Hertfordshire, England
- Party: Conservative

Sir Edward Lucas Gardner, QC (10 May 1912 – 2 August 2001) was a barrister and British Conservative Party politician. Upon his death, The Guardian referred to him as 'the last of the pre-war-style Conservative QC-MPs'.

== Life and family ==
Gardner was born in Preston, Lancashire on 10 May 1912 and was educated at Hutton Grammar School. After leaving education he initially worked as a journalist.

Gardner married Nina Collins in 1950 (having one son, one daughter) but was divorced in 1962. Then in 1963, he married Joan Belcher (also having one son, one daughter); this second marriage lasting until Joan's death in 1999. Gardner died in Bishop's Stortford, Hertfordshire on 2 August 2001 aged 89.

== Military career ==
Gardner served in the Royal Navy during the Second World War, surviving the sinking of two ships. In 1945 he was appointed a Commander in the RNVR and Chief of Naval Information (East Indies).

== Legal career ==
Gardner became a barrister, called to the bar by Gray's Inn in 1947, and was deputy chairman of the Kent quarter sessions. He became a distinguished and a Recorder of the Crown Court from 1972 to 1985. Gardner was appointed as a Queen's Counsel in 1960 and was subsequently admitted to the Nigerian and British Guianan bars: he also appeared in the courts of Goa, the High Court of Singapore and the Supreme Court of India, besides having an extensive practice in England.

He was a leading member of the Society of Conservative Lawyers, chairman of its executive committee from 1969 to 1975, and Chairman, 1975–85. Under his guidance, the society produced a steady flow of influential pamphlets on suggested changes to the criminal law. He chaired the committees that produced Rough Justice, a statement on the future of the law, in 1968, Crisis in Crime and Punishment (1971) and The Proper Use of Prisons (1978).

== Political career ==
Gardner contested Erith and Crayford in 1955. He was Member of Parliament for Billericay from 1959 until he lost in 1966 by 1,642 votes (despite polling more than 38,000 votes). He returned as MP for Fylde South 1970-83 then for Fylde 1983 to 1987 when he retired.

In 1987 Gardner made the first attempt to incorporate the European Convention on Human Rights into English law with a Private Member's Bill. Despite gathering some distinguished cross-party support (including Lord Hailsham of Saint Marylebone), he was unable to secure sufficient support to see his Bill into law. He was a strong advocate of Britain's membership of the common market. "Pulling Britain out of Europe would desolate our industries, increase our unemployment and reduce our stature in the world to insignificance….isolated from Europe we should no longer be able to influence legislation or rules which govern our trade".

Gardner's major contribution to the law was the British Nationality Act 1981. Whilst in opposition in 1977, the Conservative Party asked Gardner to chair a study group to provide advice on changes to the nationality laws. The resultant Green paper, "Who Do We Think We Are?", was published in 1980 and its threefold definition of nationality formed the basis for the Government's legislation.

== Achievements ==
Called to the Bar, Gray's Inn in 1947; MP (Conservative) for Billericay 1959–66, for South Fylde 1970–83, for Fylde 1983–87; became a QC 1960; PPS to the Attorney General 1962–63; Chairman, Justice Working Party on Bail and Remands in Custody 1966; Chairman, Bar Council Committee on Parliamentary Privilege 1967; Recorder of the Crown Court 1972–85; Chairman, Society of Conservative Lawyers 1975–85; Steward, British Boxing Board of Control 1975–84; Knighted in 1983; Chairman, Select Committee on Home Affairs 1984–87.

== Sources ==
- The Times Guide to the House of Commons, Times Newspapers Ltd, 1955, 1966 & 1983
- Leigh Rayment's Historical List of MPs
- Full Biography

Parliament of the United Kingdom
| Preceded by Richard Body | Member of Parliament for Billericay; 1959 – 1966 | Succeeded by Eric Moonman |
| Preceded by Claude Lancaster | Member of Parliament for Fylde South; 1970 – 1983 | Constituency abolished |
| New constituency | Member of Parliament for Fylde; 1983 – 1987 | Succeeded by Michael Jack |
