= Thomas Dugdale, 1st Baron Crathorne =

British Conservative politician (1897–1977)

The Right Honourable The Lord Crathorne TD PC
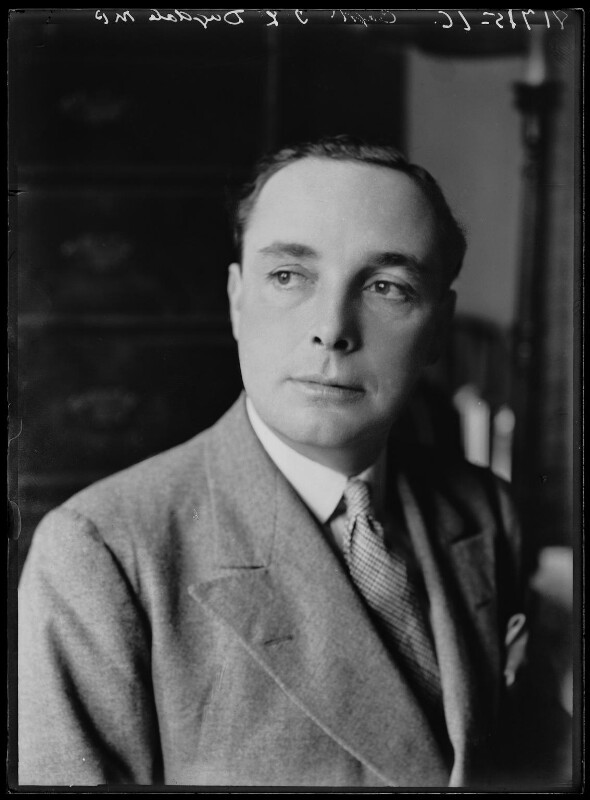
- Dugdale in 1936

Minister of Agriculture and Fisheries
- In office 5 November 1951 – 28 July 1954
- Prime Minister: Winston Churchill
- Preceded by: Tom Williams
- Succeeded by: Derick Heathcoat-Amory

Chairman of the Conservative Party
- In office 6 March 1942 – 29 October 1944
- Leader: Winston Churchill
- Preceded by: Douglas Hacking
- Succeeded by: Ralph Assheton

Government Deputy Chief Whip in the House of Commons
- In office 8 February 1941 – 23 February 1942 Serving with William Whiteley
- Prime Minister: Winston Churchill
- Preceded by: James Stuart; William Whiteley
- Succeeded by: John McEwen; Leslie Pym

Lord Commissioner of the Treasury
- In office 8 February 1941 – 23 February 1942
- Prime Minister: Winston Churchill
- Preceded by: Wilfred Paling
- Succeeded by: Arthur Young
- In office 28 May 1937 – 12 February 1940
- Prime Minister: Neville Chamberlain
- Preceded by: Sir Archibald Southby
- Succeeded by: William Boulton

Member of the House of Lords
- Lord Temporal
- In office 9 October 1959 – 26 March 1977
- Preceded by: Peerage created
- Succeeded by: The 2nd Baron Crathorne

Member of Parliament for Richmond
- In office 30 May 1929 – 18 September 1959
- Preceded by: Sir Murrough John Wilson
- Succeeded by: Timothy Kitson

Personal details
- Born: 20 July 1897
- Died: 26 March 1977 (aged 79)
- Party: Conservative
- Spouse: Nancy Tennant
- Children: James Dugdale
- Parent: James Dugdale
- Education: Eton College
- Alma mater: Royal Military College, Sandhurst

Thomas Lionel Dugdale, 1st Baron Crathorne, TD, PC (20 July 1897 – 26 March 1977), known as Sir Thomas Dugdale, 1st Baronet, from 1945 to 1959, was a British Conservative Party politician. He resigned as a government minister over the Crichel Down Affair, often quoted as a classic example of the convention of individual ministerial responsibility.

== Background and early life ==
Thomas Dugdale was the son of Captain James Lionel Dugdale, of Crathorne Hall near Yarm in Yorkshire. His grandfather John Dugdale (died 1881) was from a family of Lancashire cotton manufacturers, and had bought the Crathorne estate in 1844.

Dugdale was educated at Eton College and the Royal Military College, Sandhurst. He joined the Army in 1916, serving with the Scots Greys in the First World War and the Yorkshire Hussars in the Second World War.

== Political career ==
In 1929, Dugdale was elected as Member of Parliament (MP) for Richmond, North Yorkshire, where he remained until 1959. He served as Parliamentary Private Secretary to several ministers, including Stanley Baldwin, and Deputy Chief Whip. He was later Chairman of the Conservative Party and Chairman of the Party's Agricultural Committee. He was created a baronet in the 1945 New Year Honours "for political and public services".

=== The Crichel Down affair ===
When the Conservatives won the 1951 election, Churchill made Dugdale his Minister of Agriculture and Fisheries.

Crichel Down was a piece of farmland in Dorset which had been bought compulsorily by the government for defence use. George Marten, whose wife Mary was the only child and heiress of the original owner of the land, Lord Alington, wanted to buy the land back in the 1950s, because it was no longer used by the Ministry of Defence. However, the Ministry of Agriculture resisted, wanting to use the land for experimental farming in a time of rationing and agricultural development. Marten, a former equerry to the royal family, had very influential friends and stirred up considerable trouble in the local Conservative Party and on the government backbenches. There followed a public inquiry that criticised the department's decision and its civil servants, especially their methods, which were seen as an example of an over-powerful state.

In 1954, Dugdale announced that Marten could buy the land back, and told the House of Commons he was resigning, having been the responsible minister.

=== Resignation ===
Dugdale's resignation went down in history as an honourable, even heroic, one: a minister taking responsibility for civil servants' actions, which would lead to the perceived code of individual ministerial responsibility. However, in papers released thirty years after the affair it was found that Dugdale had known and approved of his civil servants' actions, and had to an extent passed the blame to them himself. It was also found that the inquiry was inaccurate and biased, having been led by a former Conservative candidate who was very opposed to civil servants and state interference.

Dugdale's junior minister, Lord Carrington, also tendered his resignation, but it was refused. He went on to be Foreign Secretary, resigning the post in 1982 over the Falklands War. Marten received his land, but not a Conservative parliamentary seat, for which he had hoped.

In 1959, Dugdale was raised to the peerage as Baron Crathorne, of Crathorne in the North Riding of the County of York. Subsequently, he had a second political career in Europe, building links with parliamentarians in NATO and the Council of Europe.

== Family ==
Dugdale married Nancy Gates (née Tennant; 1904–1969), daughter of Sir Charles Tennant, 1st Baronet, and his wife Marguerite, in 1936. He died in March 1977, aged 79. His son James succeeded him in the barony.

== Arms ==
Coat of arms of Thomas Dugdale, 1st Baron Crathorne
| Crest A gryphon's head Ermine wings addorsed Erminois gorged with a collar Azure therefrom pendant a cross moline Gules. Escutcheon Ermine a cross moline Gules between four hurts. Supporters Dexter a crow Sable beaked and membered Or in the beak a sprig of blackthorn flowered Proper; sinister a stag also Sable attired unguled and gorged with a mural crown Gold charged on the shoulder with a thistle slipped and leaved also Proper. Motto Perseverando (By Persevering) |

== Notes ==
Parliament of the United Kingdom
| Preceded by Sir Murrough Wilson | Member of Parliament for Richmond; 1929–1959 | Succeeded by Timothy Kitson |
Political offices
| Preceded by James Stuart; William Whiteley | Deputy Chief Whip of the House of Commons; 1941–1942; With: William Whiteley | Succeeded by John McEwen; Leslie Pym; William John |
| Preceded by Tom Williams | Minister of Agriculture and Fisheries; 1951–1954 | Succeeded by Derick Heathcoat-Amory |
Party political offices
| Preceded by James Stuart | Conservative Deputy Chief Whip in the House of Commons; 1941–1942 | Succeeded by John McEwen; Leslie Pym |
| Preceded by Douglas Hacking | Chairman of the Conservative Party; 1942–1944 | Succeeded by Ralph Assheton |
Peerage of the United Kingdom
| New creation | Baron Crathorne; 1959–1977; Member of the House of Lords (1959–1977) | Succeeded by James Dugdale |
Baronetage of the United Kingdom
| New creation | Baronet of Crathorne; 1945–1977 | Succeeded by James Dugdale |
