= 1938 Fylde by-election =

UK Parliamentary by-election

The 1938 Fylde by-election was held on 30 November 1938. The by-election was held due to the death of the incumbent Conservative MP, Edward Stanley. It was won by the Conservative candidate Claude Lancaster.

Fylde by-election, 1938
Party	Candidate	Votes	%	±%
Conservative	Claude Lancaster	38,263	68.4	−2.4
Labour	Mabel Tylecote	17,648	31.6	+2.4
Majority		20,615	36.8	−4.8
Turnout		55,911		
Conservative hold		Swing		
