= Individual ministerial responsibility =

Constitutional convention in governments using the Westminster System

In Westminster-style governments, individual ministerial responsibility is a constitutional convention that a cabinet minister bears the ultimate responsibility for the actions of their ministry or department. Individual ministerial responsibility is not the same as cabinet collective responsibility, which states members of the cabinet must approve publicly of its collective decisions or resign. This means that a Parliamentary motion for a vote of no confidence is not in order should the actions of an organ of government fail in the proper discharge of its responsibilities. Where there is ministerial responsibility, the accountable minister is expected to take the blame and ultimately resign, but the majority or coalition within parliament of which the minister is part, is not held to be answerable for that minister's failure.

This means that if waste, corruption, or any other misbehaviour is found to have occurred within a ministry, the minister is responsible even if the minister had no knowledge of the actions. A minister is ultimately responsible for all actions by a ministry because, even without knowledge of an infraction by subordinates, the minister approved the hiring and continued employment of those civil servants. If misdeeds are found to have occurred in a ministry, the minister is expected to resign. It is also possible for a minister to face criminal charges for malfeasance under their watch.

The principle is considered essential, as it is seen to guarantee that an elected official is answerable for every single government decision. It is also important to motivate ministers to closely scrutinize the activities within their departments. One rule coming from this principle is that each cabinet member answers for their own ministry in parliament's question time. The reverse of ministerial responsibility is that civil servants are not supposed to take credit for the successes of their department, allowing the government to claim them.

In recent years some commentators have argued the notion of ministerial responsibility has been eroded in many Commonwealth countries. As the doctrine is a constitutional convention, there is no formal mechanism for enforcing the rule. Today ministers frequently use ignorance of misbehaviour as an argument for lack of culpability, or argue that actions were instigated by a previous minister, or even a previous government. While opposition parties rarely accept this argument, the electorate is often more accepting. In most other Commonwealth countries such cases are today hardly ever brought to trial.

== Australia ==
The doctrine of ministerial responsibility in the Australian Government was inherited in its adoption of the Westminster system. Commonwealth ministers are obliged to report failings of departments under their control to the Parliament, and to actively seek solutions to problems in their jurisdiction. A minister who fails to properly do either of these is expected to resign.

However, in practice, resignations rarely occur for a number of reasons. Although public opinion remains strongly in favour of ministers resigning regardless of their personal involvement in departmental failings, the need for such actions has been eroded by the introduction of alternative mechanisms ensuring executive accountability, such as freedom of information laws and more powerful parliamentary committees.

== Canada ==
For organizational purposes there are Cabinet Ministers who are responsible for all activity within their department. In Canada ministerial responsibility has been reduced as it has become increasingly common for top level civil servants to be called before Parliament, bypassing the minister.

== New Zealand ==
In New Zealand, ministerial responsibility has tended to follow British practice. Ministers have resigned in cases of personal misconduct, but more rarely in cases of maladministration. Ministers have refused to resign in some cases when they have been asked to account for departmental errors. A famous case was Minister of Works Bob Semple, who refused to resign in 1944 over engineering failures in the construction of a railway tunnel. He was quoted as saying "I am responsible, but not to blame." Other departures from normal convention have included the refusal of a minister's resignation in the 1980s over compromised security of budget documents, and a minister resigning his portfolio (but not leaving Cabinet) over the 1995 Cave Creek disaster.

== United Kingdom ==
It is currently unclear what individual action a minister ought to take when a civil servant within his department is guilty of maladministration. The formulation of some guidelines took place during the Crichel Down Affair in 1954 in which the Minister of Agriculture, Thomas Dugdale, resigned, despite an inquiry suggesting that all mistakes were made within his department without his knowledge and in some cases due to deliberate deceit by civil servants. Later details suggested that he resigned because he supported the civil servants' actions and because he disagreed with the government accepting the inquiry's conclusions.

The government announced that ministers must defend civil servants who act properly and in accordance with policies set out by the minister. Furthermore, it was stated that "where an official makes a mistake or causes some delay, but not on an important issue of policy and not where a claim to individual rights is seriously involved, the Minister acknowledges the mistake and he accepts the responsibility although he is not personally involved."

In 1982, Lord Carrington (then Foreign Secretary) and two other Foreign Office ministers resigned shortly after the invasion of the Falkland Islands. Later official reviews stated that, although there had been misjudgments within the Foreign Office, no responsibility attached to any individual within the government. However, in 1983, when 38 IRA prisoners broke out of the Maze prison, the Secretary of State for Northern Ireland, James Prior, did not resign, explaining that the break-out was not caused by any policy initiative originating from him. This latter position has become the norm in British politics. An exception might be Estelle Morris, who resigned as Secretary of State for Education in 2002, saying she had not done well enough after a scandal over A-level marking.

Some recent resignations due to personal errors of judgment or impropriety include the resignation of Ron Davies, the Secretary of State for Wales, for sexual misconduct in 1998, and the resignation of Peter Mandelson, Secretary of State for Trade and Industry, for failing to disclose a substantial loan by a Cabinet colleague in 1999.

An argument put forward during the Scott Inquiry into the Arms-to-Iraq affair in the 1980s was a distinction between political responsibility and political accountability.

== See also ==
- Cabinet collective responsibility
- Ministerstyre
