= Chaloner Caffyn =

English ice hockey player

- Born: 28 April 1891; Sydney, New South Wales, Australia
- Died: 28 March 1917 (aged 25); Avesnes-le-Comte, France
- Height: 5 ft 9 in (175 cm)
- Position: Goaltender
- Played for: Princes Ice Hockey Club
- National team: England
- Playing career: 1912–1913

Chaloner McCrae Humphrey Mannington Caffyn (28 April 1891 – 28 March 1917) was an English professional ice hockey goaltender who played for the English national team.

== Personal life ==
Born in Australia, Caffyn grew up in Portsmouth and was educated at Cheltenham College. He trained as an engineer at the University of Zurich and worked at the Midland Railway Carriage and Wagon Company in Birmingham. On 14 September 1914, a month after the outbreak of the First World War, Caffyn was commissioned into the East Surrey Regiment as a second lieutenant. He served with the regiment on the Western Front for 18 months before being seconded to the Royal Flying Corps. Lieutenant Caffyn was killed on 28 March 1917 flying Nieuport Scout A.6673 when the aircraft's wings collapsed over Avesnes-le-Comte. He was buried at the Avesnes-le-Comte Communal Cemetery Extension. His elder brother Harold had been killed in Hainaut two years earlier.

== Career statistics ==
=== International career ===
			Regular season					Goal statistics				Playoffs					Goal statistics
Season	Team	Competition	GP	W	L	T	SO	Min	GA	GAA	PIM	GP	W	L	T	SO	Min	GA	GAA	PIM
1912–13	England	Ligue Internationale de Hockey sur Glace	4	3	1	0	2	160	3	0.75	–	–	–	–	–	–	–	–	–	–
International career totals			4	3	1	0	2	160	3	0.75	–	–	–	–	–	–	–	–	–	–
