= Thomas Chaloner, 2nd Baron Gisborough =

English peer

Thomas Weston Peel Long Chaloner, 2nd Baron Gisborough (6 May 1889 – 11 February 1951) was an English landowner, soldier and peer.

== Life ==
The second son of Richard Godolphin Walmesley Chaloner, 1st Baron Gisborough and Margaret Mary Ann Brocklesby Davis, he was born at Sedgehill, Wiltshire and educated at Rottingdean, Radley College, Eton College and Trinity College, Cambridge.

He attained the rank of captain in the Yorkshire Regiment, and served in World War I with the Royal Flying Corps in Egypt, England and France. Shot down while on a bombing raid to St. Quentin with 13 Squadron on 1 July 1916, he was held as a prisoner of war for two years. He escaped in May 1918, but only made it as far as the Netherlands, which was neutral at the time: he was interned for the rest of the war and not repatriated until January 1919.

Gisborough joined the peacetime Territorial Force, serving with the Green Howards from April 1921. He rose to the rank of major before relinquishing his commission in 1930. As his elder brother had been accidentally killed in World War I while guarding German prisoners of war, he succeeded his father as 2nd Baron Gisborough on 23 January 1938.

In August 1939, although now 50 years old, Gisborough joined the Royal Air Force Volunteer Reserve, and was initially posted to RAF Catterick on administration duties. Moving into intelligence duties in February 1940, he was posted to 41 Squadron as Intelligence Officer in May 1940. The Squadron was subsequently based at stations such as Hornchurch and Tangmere, which were in the forefront in the Battle of Britain. He remained in this post with 41 Squadron until June 1945, moving with them to the Continent in December 1944 and ultimately into Germany in April 1945.

In 1923 he married Esther Isabella Madeleine Hall. There was one son and one daughter from the marriage. He died 11 February 1951 and was succeeded as 3rd Baron Gisborough by his son Richard Chaloner, 3rd Baron Gisborough.

== Arms ==
Coat of arms of Thomas Chaloner, 2nd Baron Gisborough
Crest A demi sea-wolf Or. Escutcheon Sable a chevron between three cherubims Or. Supporters On either side a kneeling angel wings elevated inverted and endorsed each ensigned on the hand with a cross all Or. Motto Frugality Is The Left Hand Of Fortune And Diligence The Right

== See also ==
- Category:Long family (Wiltshire)

== Sources ==
- Proceedings of the Huguenot Society of London, 1983
- Obituary The Times 2 March 1951; Issue 51939

Peerage of the United Kingdom
Preceded by Richard Chaloner	Baron Gisborough; 1938–1951	Succeeded by Richard Chaloner
