= William Challoner =

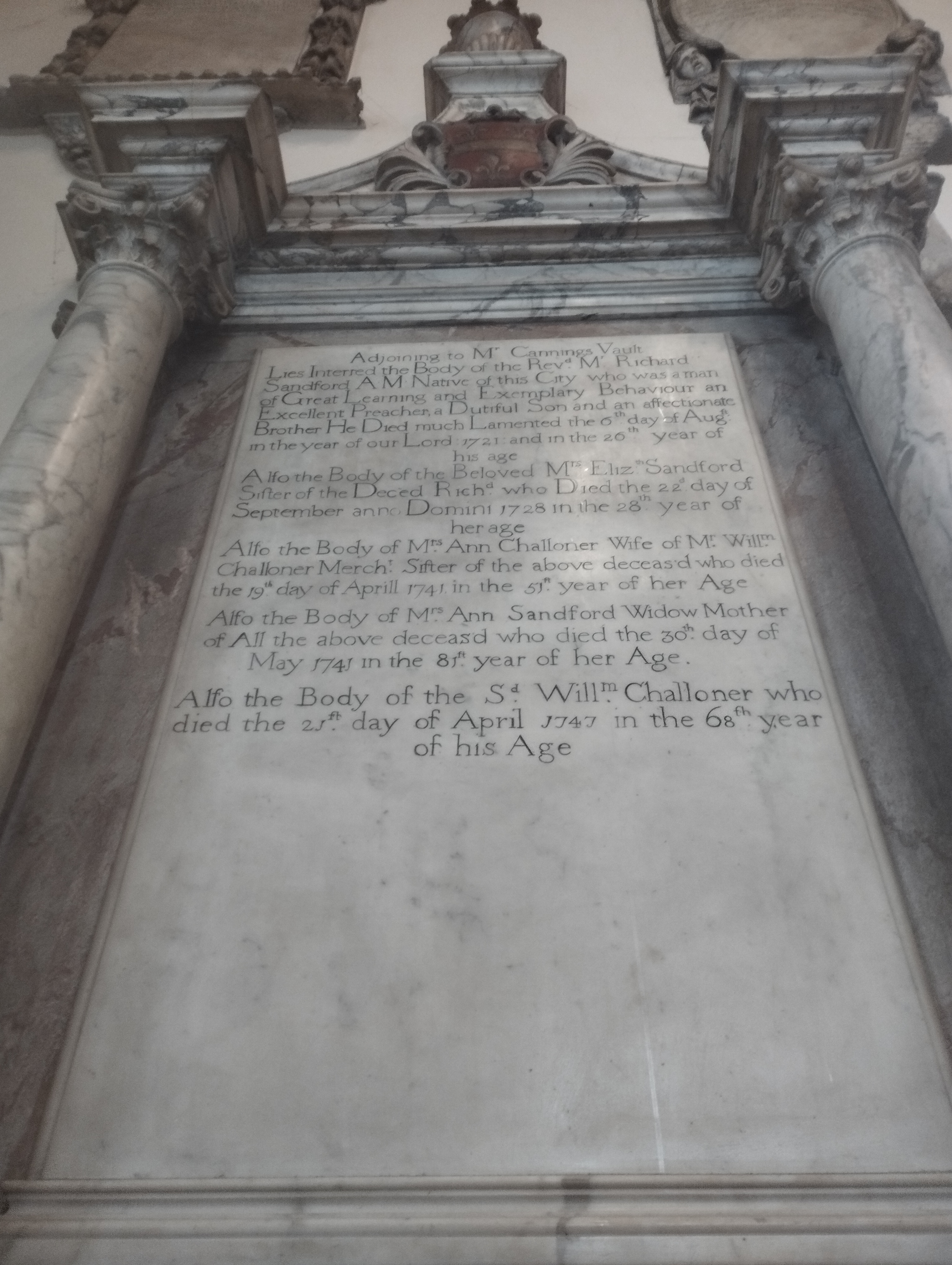
A memorial to Challoner at St Mary Redcliffe Church, Bristol

William Challoner (or Chaloner) (fl. 1709–1734) was a prominent English slave trader in the 18th century.

Challoner's parentage is obscure; however, it is known that he came from the numerous and prosperous Bristol family of the same name. He may have been a son or grandson of Robert Challoner, a previous Sheriff of Bristol, and treasurer of the Society of Merchant Venturers in 1646. The Challoners were well connected in the Bristol shipping and slaving industry, with previous members connected in marriage to the Colston family, and the Knight and Aldworth families, who both owned a sugar refinery in Bristol.

Challoner was the son of a mercer, and was a mariner by training. Ship records show him captaining a shipment to Leghorne in 1709. In September 1714, Challoner paid £50 to become a member of the Society of Merchant Venturers. Between 1714 and 1726, he was responsible for thirteen voyages, making him one of the leading agents for the slave trade out of Bristol. Shipping records show him as owner or co-owner of, in 1724, the brig America, and the Illustrious, and in 1734 the Greyhound. His co-owners included Isaac Hobhouse.
