= Marshall Caffyn =

Australian rules footballer

Personal information
- Full name: Marshall Anderson Caffyn
- Born: 4 November 1892; Hawthorn, Victoria
- Died: 4 January 1966 (aged 73); Maroubra, New South Wales
- Original team: Carlton District / Rainbow

Playing career^{1}
Years	Club	Games (Goals)
1913	South Melbourne	1 (0)
- ^{1} Playing statistics correct to the end of 1913.

Marshall Anderson Caffyn (4 November 1892 – 4 January 1966) was an Australian rules footballer who played with South Melbourne in the Victorian Football League (VFL).
