= Avesnes-le-Comte =

- Commune
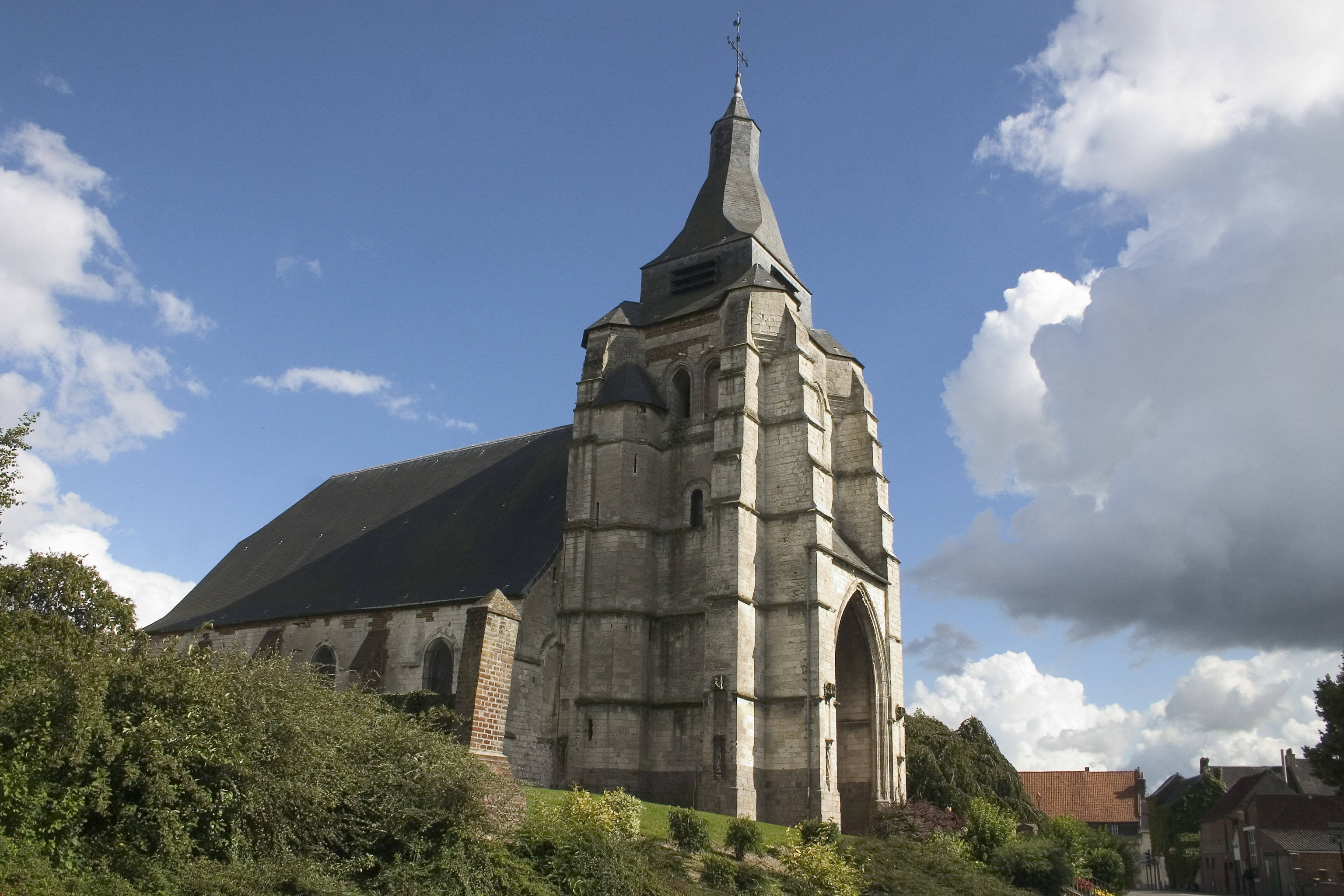
- The church of Avesnes-le-Comte

- Coat of arms
- Location of Avesnes-le-Comte
- Location within France Location within Hauts-de-France
- Coordinates: 50°16′39″N 2°31′46″E
- Country: France
- Region: Hauts-de-France
- Department: Pas-de-Calais
- Arrondissement: Arras
- Canton: Avesnes-le-Comte
- Intercommunality: CC Campagnes de l'Artois

Government
  - Mayor (2020–2026): Sébastien Bertout
- Area^{1}: 9.38 km^{2} (3.62 sq mi)
- Elevation: 152 m (499 ft)
- Highest elevation: 154 m (505 ft)
- Lowest elevation: 99 m (325 ft)
- Population (2023): 1,840
  - Density: 196/km^{2} (508/sq mi)
- Time zone: UTC+01:00 (CET)
  - Summer (DST): UTC+02:00 (CEST)
- INSEE/Postal code: 62063 /62810
- ^{1} French Land Register data, which excludes lakes, ponds, glaciers > 1 km^{2} (0.386 sq mi or 247 acres) and river estuaries.

Avesnes-le-Comte (French pronunciation: [avɛn lə kɔ̃t]; Picard: Avesne-el-Comte) is a commune in the Pas-de-Calais department in northern France.

== Geography ==
It is a small farming town located 11 miles (17 km) west of Arras at the junction of the D8, D75 and D339 roads.

== Population ==
Historical population
Year	Pop.	±% p.a.
1968	1,424	—
1975	1,490	+0.65%
1982	1,835	+3.02%
1990	2,011	+1.15%
1999	1,983	−0.16%
2007	2,072	+0.55%
2012	2,028	−0.43%
2017	1,902	−1.27%
2023	1,840	−0.55%
Source: INSEE

== Sights ==
- The motte of a 12th-century castle.
- The church of St. Nicholas, with the apse dating from the twelfth century.
- The town hall, built in 1830.
- An ancient cemetery.
- The war memorial.

== See also ==
- Communes of the Pas-de-Calais department
