= Richard Chaloner, 3rd Baron Gisborough =

British peer (born 1927)

(Thomas) Richard John Long Chaloner, 3rd Baron Gisborough (born 1 July 1927) is a British peer.

Chaloner was born at Hurworth Old Hall, Darlington, the son of Thomas Chaloner, 2nd Baron Gisborough, and Esther Hall. He succeeded his father as Baron Gisborough in 1951. In 1967 he was appointed to the Board of Universal Television Yorkshire. In 1973, he was appointed deputy lieutenant of the North Riding of Yorkshire and in 1981 he became Lord Lieutenant of Cleveland. Lord Gisborough was one of the few former members of the House of Lords to be in place for the accession of Queen Elizabeth II and to be living for the accession of her successor, King Charles III.

Coat of arms of Richard Chaloner, 3rd Baron Gisborough
Crest A demi sea-wolf Or. Escutcheon Sable a chevron between three cherubims Or. Supporters On either side a kneeling angel wings elevated inverted and endorsed each ensigned on the hand with a cross all Or. Motto Frugality Is The Left Hand of Fortune And Diligence The Right

Honorary titles
Preceded by John Pounder	Lord Lieutenant of Cleveland; 1981–1996	Merged with Lord Lieutenant of North Yorkshire
Preceded by Sir Marcus Worsley, Bt	Lord Lieutenant of North Yorkshire; 1996–2001; With: Sir Marcus Worsley, Bt 1996–1999; The Lord Crathorne 1999–2001	Succeeded by The Lord Crathorne
Peerage of the United Kingdom
Preceded by Thomas Chaloner	Baron Gisborough; 1951–present Member of the House of Lords (1951–1999)	Incumbent; Heir apparent: Hon. Thomas Chaloner
