= Lord Lieutenant of Cleveland =

Civil post in Cleveland, England

This is a list of people who have served as Lord Lieutenant of Cleveland from the county's creation in 1974 until the abolition of the Lord Lieutenancy in 1997:

- 1974–1978: Major Cecil Crosthwaite
- 1979–1980: Colonel John Ashton Pounder
- 1981–1997: Richard Chaloner, 3rd Baron Gisborough

Following the abolition of the county in 1996 and the passage of the Lieutenancies Act 1997, the area to the north of the River Tees was restored to the Lord Lieutenancy of Durham, and the area to the south was ceded to the Lord Lieutenancy of North Yorkshire.
