= James Dugdale, 2nd Baron Crathorne =

British peer (born 1939)

The Right Honourable The Lord Crathorne KCVO KStJ FRSA FSA
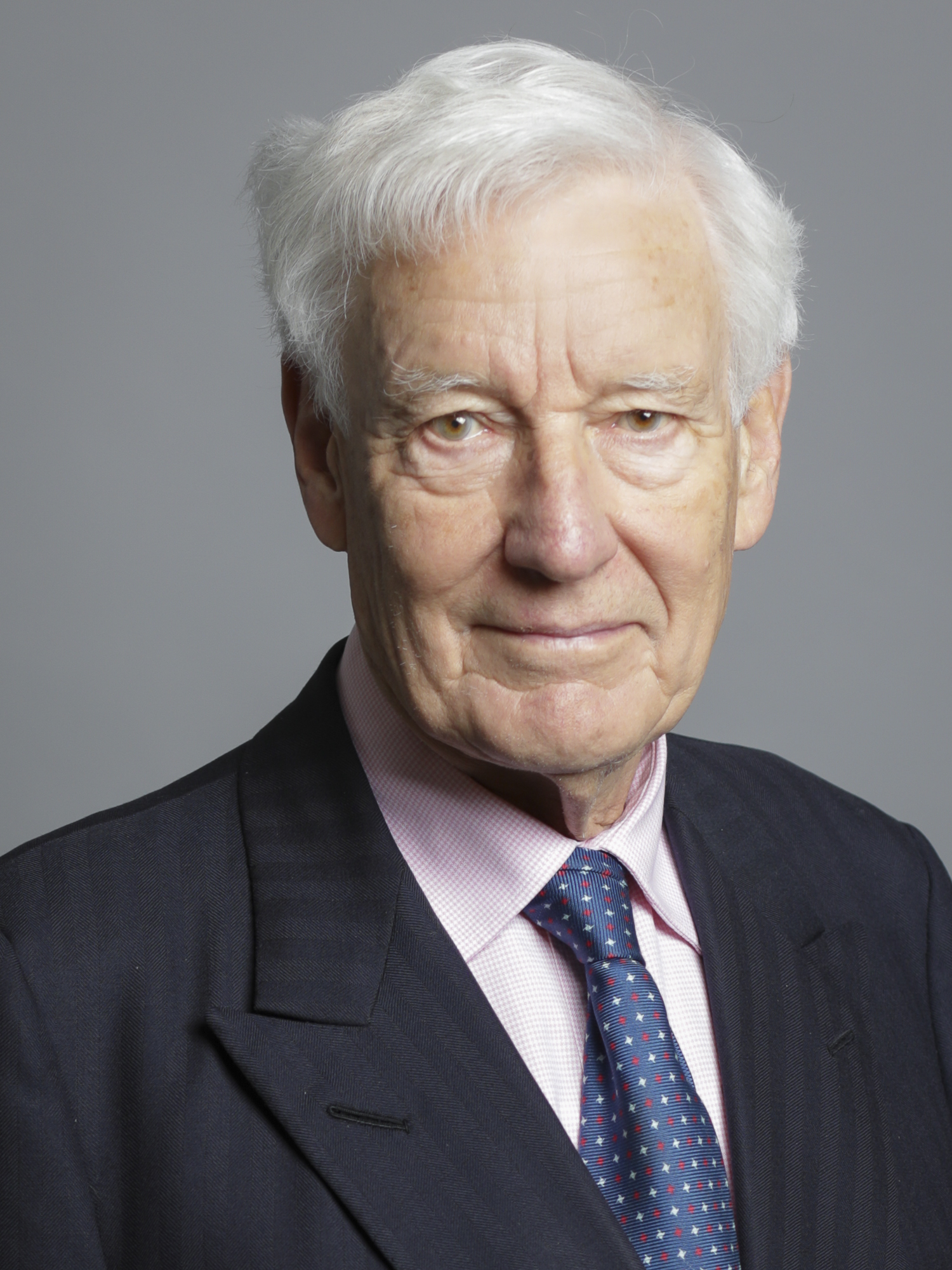

Lord Lieutenant of North Yorkshire
- In office 1999–2014
- Monarch: Elizabeth II
- Preceded by: Sir Marcus Worsley, 5th Baronet
- Succeeded by: Barry Dodd

Member of the House of Lords
- Lord Temporal
- Hereditary peerage 25 May 1977 – 11 November 1999
- Preceded by: The 1st Baron Crathorne
- Succeeded by: Seat abolished
- Elected Hereditary Peer; 11 November 1999 – 29 April 2026
- Election: 1999
- Preceded by: Seat established
- Succeeded by: Seat abolished

Personal details
- Born: 12 September 1939 (age 87)
- Party: Conservative
- Education: Eton College, Berkshire

Charles James Dugdale, 2nd Baron Crathorne, KCVO, KStJ, FRSA, FSA (born 12 September 1939), is a British politician, hereditary peer and former member of the House of Lords as an elected hereditary peer from 11 November 1999 to 29 April 2026, and as a hereditary since 25 May 1977. He also served as the Lord Lieutenant of North Yorkshire from 1999 until 2014. Crathorne is a member of the Conservative Party.

== Career ==
The son of Thomas Dugdale, 1st Baron Crathorne, and Nancy Tennant, he was educated at Eton College in Berkshire. He was further educated at Trinity College, Cambridge, where he graduated with a BA degree (later converted to an MA) in fine arts in 1963. Crathorne worked in the impressionist painting department of Sotheby & Co from 1963 to 1966, when he became assistant to president of the Parke-Bernet Galleries in New York City, a post he held until 1969.

In 1969, he created an independent fine art consultancy, James Dugdale & Associates, which later became James Crathorne & Associates, and has made many lecture tours to the United States. In 1981, Crathorne held a lecture series about "Aspects of England" at the Metropolitan Museum in New York City and in 1988, he made a lecture tour for the bicentenary of Australia, talking about Captain James Cook. From 1979 to 1993, he was director of Blakeney Hotels Ltd, from 1988 to 1999 of Woodhouse Securities Ltd, and from 2000 to 2001 of Hand Picked Hotels. Between 1993 and 1998, he was also director of Cliveden plc, and from 1999 of its successor, Cliveden Ltd.

Crathorne was Honorary Secretary of the All Party Parliamentary Arts and Heritage Group at Westminster for 1981 and became Chairman & Hon. Secretary in 2010, and in 2015 became Co-Chairman & Hon. Sec. Since 1988 he has been a member of the Advisory Panel on Works of Art in the House of Lords and from 1997 he has been Joint Secretary of the All Party Parliamentary Photography Group.

== Affiliations ==
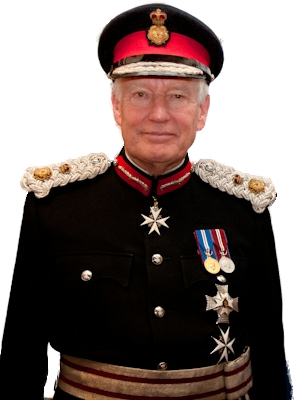
Lord Crathorne in Lord Lieutenant's uniform

Crathorne was a member of the council of the Royal Society of Arts from 1982 to 1988. He was a member of the court of the University of Leeds from 1985 to 1997, and governor of the Queen Margaret's School, York Ltd from 1986 to 1999. Between 1983 and 2011, he was member of the editorial board of House magazine at Westminster. Since 1987 he was president of the Yarm Civic Society. For the Georgian Group, he has been a member of the executive committee, and was its chair between 1990 and 1999.

Crathorne has been also president of the Cleveland Sea Cadets, of the Cleveland Family History Society as well as of the Hambleton District of the Campaign to Protect Rural England since 1988. He was patron of the Cleveland Community Foundation from 1990 to 2004, and president of the Cleveland and North Yorkshire branch of the Magistrates' Association from 1997 to 2003. For the Joint Committee of the National Amenity Societies, he was deputy chair between 1993 and 1996 and chair between 1996 and 1999.

Since 1997, Crathorne has been vice president of The Public Monuments and Sculpture Association (PMSA), and since 1998 he was president of the Cleveland Mountain Rescue Team. Since 1999, he has been also president of the North Yorkshire County Scout Council, patron of the North Yorkshire Branch of the British Red Cross, as well as member of the court of the University of York and the University of Hull. Crathorne was vice-president of the Yorkshire and the Humber branch of the Reserve Forces and Cadets Association (RFCA) since 1999, and its president from 2006 to 2009. He was further vice-president of the RFCA in North England since 2001, president of the Cleveland and South Durham branch of the Magistrates' Association since 2003 and patron of the Tees Valley Community Foundation since 2004. He was President of The Yorkshire Agricultural Society in 2014–15.

Crathorne has been trustee of the Georgian Theatre Royal in Richmond since 1970, vice-president of the Cleveland Wildlife Trust since 1989, and patron of the Attingham Trust for the Study of the British Country House since 1990. For the Captain Cook Birthplace Museum Trust, he has been trustee since 1978 and chair since 1993. From 1988 to 1994, Crathorne was member of the National Trust of the Yorkshire Regional Committee, and, from 1992 to 1995, he was trustee of the National Heritage Memorial Fund.

== Honours and awards ==
In 1972, Crathorne became a Fellow of the Royal Society of Arts (FRSA). In 1999, he was made a Knight of the Venerable Order of Saint John (KStJ). In 2002, Crathorne received the Queen's Golden Jubilee Medal. He became a Fellow of the Society of Antiquaries of London (FSA) in 2010. In 1999 Crathorne was appointed Lord Lieutenant of North Yorkshire, for which he was appointed Knight Commander of the Royal Victorian Order (KCVO) in the 2013 New Year Honours.

He was awarded an Honorary LLD degree by Teesside University in 2013. The Freedom of the Town of Richmond was conferred on Crathorne on 24 July 2014 by the Town Mayor and Councillors. He retired as Lord Lieutenant on 12 September 2014. He was awarded an honorary DUniv degree from the University of York in 2015. The Freedom of the City of York was conferred to Crathorne in April 2015.

Coat of arms of James Dugdale, 2nd Baron Crathorne
Crest A gryphon's head Ermine wings addorsed Erminois gorged with a collar Azure therefrom pendant a cross moline Gules. Escutcheon Ermine a cross moline Gules between four hurts. Supporters Dexter a crow Sable beaked and membered Or in the beak a sprig of blackthorn flowered Proper; sinister a stag also Sable attired unguled and gorged with a mural crown Gold charged on the shoulder with a thistle slipped and leaved also Proper. Motto Perseverando (By Persevering)

== Family ==
From 1970, he was married to Sylvia Mary Montgomery, a daughter of actress Jane Baxter. She died of cancer in 2009. They had two daughters and a son.

== Works ==
- Edouard Vuillard Purnell (1967)
- Tennant's Stalk (1973) ISBN 0333138201
- A Present from Crathorne (1989)
- Cliveden, the Place and the People (1995)
- The Royal Crescent Book of Bath (1998)
- Parliament in Pictures (1999)

Honorary titles
Preceded by Sir Marcus Worsley, Bt	Lord Lieutenant of North Yorkshire; 1999–2014	Succeeded by Barry Dodd
Peerage of the United Kingdom
Preceded by Thomas Crathorne	Baron Crathorne; 1977–present Member of the House of Lords (1977–1999)	Incumbent; Heir apparent: Hon. Thomas Dugdale
Parliament of the United Kingdom
New office created by the House of Lords Act 1999	Elected hereditary peer to the House of Lords under the House of Lords Act 1999; 1999–2026	Office abolished under the House of Lords (Hereditary Peers) Act 2026
