= Richard Chaloner, 1st Baron Gisborough =

British soldier and politician (1856–1938)

Chaloner in 1895

Richard Godolphin Walmesley Chaloner, 1st Baron Gisborough (né Long; 12 October 1856 – 23 January 1938) was a British soldier and politician. He was a Conservative Member of Parliament (MP) from 1895 to 1900 and 1910 to 1917, and a member of the House of Lords from 1917 until his death in 1938.

== Career ==
Chaloner was the son of Richard Penruddocke Long, an MP from 1859 to 1868, and younger brother of The 1st Viscount Long. His family owned Rood Ashton House in Wiltshire and had lived in the county since the end of the 14th century. Chaloner's maternal grandfather was William Dick, a member for County Wicklow from 1852 to 1880. In 1888, he assumed the surname of Chaloner by royal licence in accordance with the will of his maternal great-uncle Admiral Thomas Chaloner, who had inherited Gisborough Hall and the Gisborough estate in North Yorkshire through his mother, a descendant of Robert de Brus.

Chaloner was educated at Winchester College and the Royal Military College, Sandhurst, after which he was commissioned a second lieutenant in the 3rd Hussars on 30 January 1878. He served in the Second Anglo-Afghan War 1879–1880, and was promoted to lieutenant on 1 July 1881. Promotion to captain came on 1 July 1887, followed by brevet appointments as major and lieutenant-colonel on 10 February 1894. He transferred to the Reserve of Officers, and became lieutenant-colonel in command of the 1st Wiltshire Volunteer Rifles. Following the outbreak of the Second Boer War in October 1899, many volunteer officers were commissioned as part of the Imperial Yeomanry which was created in December 1899. Chaloner was appointed in command of the 1st (Wiltshire) Company of the 1st Battalion, and left Liverpool for South Africa on the SS Cymric in March 1900.

Chaloner was first elected to Parliament for Westbury in the 1895 general election. At the next general election in 1900, he was defeated by the Liberal candidate John Fuller. In the January 1910 general election, Chaloner was re-elected to Parliament succeeding the Liberal MP J. E. B. Seely in the constituency of Liverpool Abercromby. He retained this seat until 18 June 1917, when he was made Steward of the Chiltern Hundreds, a post that expelled him from the Commons, thus effectively resigning from the Commons. On 23 June 1917, he was made the Baron Gisborough, of Cleveland in the County of York, and became a member of the House of Lords. A by-election was held in Liverpool Abercromby to replace him. Lord Gisborough died in 1938 in Cleveland, aged 81, and was succeeded in the barony by his second son, Thomas.

== Family ==
In 1882, he married Margaret Brocklesby Davis (died 1941) and they had two sons and four daughters. Their elder son, Richard, died in France in 1917 while guarding German prisoners of war.

== Arms ==
Coat of arms of Richard Chaloner, 1st Baron Gisborough
Crest A demi sea-wolf Or. Escutcheon Sable a chevron between three cherubims Or. Supporters On either side a kneeling angel wings elevated inverted and endorsed each ensigned on the hand with a cross all Or. Motto Frugality Is The Left Hand Of Fortune And Diligence The Right

== Notes ==
Parliament of the United Kingdom
Preceded by George Fuller	Member of Parliament for Westbury; 1895 – 1900	Succeeded by John Fuller
Preceded by J. E. B. Seely	Member of Parliament for Liverpool Abercromby; 1910 – 1917	Succeeded by Lord Stanley
Peerage of the United Kingdom
New creation	Baron Gisborough; 1917–1938	Succeeded by Thomas Chaloner
